= Early childhood =

Stage in human development

Early childhood is a stage, in child development following infancy and preceding middle childhood. It generally includes toddlerhood and some time afterward. Play age is an unspecific designation approximately within the scope of early childhood.

== Development of self-regulation across early childhood ==
Development during early childhood is an important topic, specifically self-regulation during this stage of development. This study took place in 4 different areas, which included Michigan State University, Oregon State University, University of Michigan, and the Texas Health Science Center at Houston. Within this study, a sample of 1,386 children between the ages of 3 and 7 years old were studied. Self-regulation is known as an individual functioning that leads to future life successes or goals. Areas that played a role in these children's trajectories were their gender, the language they spoke, and even their mother's education. The main limitation of this study was that the researchers were not able to gain the full view of self-regulation due to the fact children tend to develop rapidly between the ages of 3 and 7. This made it more difficult to assess their progress and when it occurred.

== Brain development during early childhood ==
More than one million new neural connections are formed every second during early childhood.

== Psychology ==
In psychology, the term early childhood is usually defined as the time period from birth until the age of five or six years, therefore covering infancy, Pre-K, kindergarten and first grade. There are three simultaneous development stages: It is distinct from early childhood education, and does not necessarily refer to the same developmental stage of early childhood. It is an educational category designed to support children from nursery schools, all the way until the equivalent of third grade.

== Piaget's Theory of Development ==
=== Stages ===
1. Sensorimotor, ages birth to 2 years old.
  – During this stage, children gain an idea of the world using skills such as hearing, seeing, touching, and reaching. This allows them to gain the understanding that things exist and assists in rapid development.
2. Preoperational, ages 2 to 7 years old.
  – Children are able to form thoughts without logic, but helps give them a better understanding of the world around them.
3. Concrete Operational, ages 7 to 11.
  – Includes developed as well as rational thoughts. This stage also allows children to gain thoughts such as the organization and purpose of situations.
4. Formal Operational, ages 11 and up.
  – During this stage, individuals are able to create thoughts of their own, rationalize, create ideas in situations, and overall have opinions that are supported. In adulthood, this is the most important stage of development in terms of learning.

=== Physical growth and development ===
In this phase, there is significant synaptic growth and myelination of neural fibers in the brain, especially within the frontal lobes. For example, between the ages 2 and 6, the brain increases from 70% of its adult weight to 90%. The growth of the brain is followed by a surge in cognitive abilities. Around the age of five, children start speaking properly and master their hand-to-eye coordination.

It is optimal that an environment is provided that encourages physical development and allows the children to explore and try out new things. The physical development in children follows a pattern. The large muscles develop before the small muscles. The large muscles are used for walking, running, and other physical activities. These are known as gross motor skills. Small muscles are used for fine motor skills such as picking up objects, writing, drawing, throwing, and catching.

=== Cognitive growth and development ===
Called the preoperational stage by Jean Piaget, this is the stage during which the child repeatedly asks "Why?", and is used to build relationships with the child. The child cannot yet perform the abstract thinking operations. The child has to be able to see what is being talked about, because they do not understand the concepts of logic, betrayal, contemplation, etc. This means that they think literally: if a child is told that they have to go to bed because "night is falling", they will ask how can the night (literally) fall from the sky. They also see the human characteristics in every object, e.g. the table "is bad" if they accidentally hit it with their foot and it hurts. They also exhibit egocentrism; not to be confused with egoism; that being said, they do not comprehend that the other person has beliefs of their own, and the children at this age think that what they think, everybody thinks. There is also a matter of perceptive centration, which causes the children to primarily see what is visually most prominent on someone/something, e.g. if a man has long hair, the child will think he's a woman.

=== Social-emotional growth and development ===
This includes children understanding a sense of 'self', relationships with others, and sociability. The emotional development includes expressions, attachment, and personality. Children manifest fear of dark and monsters, and around the age of three, notice whether they are a boy or a girl and start acting that way. Boys are usually more aggressive, whilst girls are more caring. However, aggression is manifested in two different ways: boys are more physically aggressive, while girls are more socially aggressive (name-calling and ignoring). In this stage, the individual differences become more prominent.

Children who often came from lower-income families tended to express more challenges such as bullying, disruptive behaviors, and overall negative outbursts in situations. The results were gained from the National Longitudinal Survey of Youth. Other factors of the mother were also examined such as their ethnicity, education level, the mother's birth age, and even how many siblings the mother had. Poverty, punishment, depression, and having a single mother are correlated to how the children behaved.

== Education ==
Infants and toddlers experience life more holistically than any other age group Social, emotional, cognitive, language, and physical lessons are not learned separately by very young children. Adults who are most helpful to young children interact in ways that understand that the child is learning from the whole experience, not just that part of the experience to which the adult gives attention.

The most information learned occurs between birth and the age of three, during this time, humans develop more quickly and rapidly than they would at any other point in their life. Love, affection, encouragement, and mental stimulation from the parents or guardians of these young children aid in development. At this time in life, the brain is growing rapidly and it is easier for information to be absorbed as parts of the brain can nearly double in a year.

During this stage, children need vital nutrients and personal interaction for their brains to grow properly. Children's brains will expand and become more developed in these early years. Although adults play a huge part in early childhood development, the most important way children develop is through interaction with other children. Children develop close relationships with the children they spend a large period of time with. Close relationships with peers develop strong social connections that can be transferred later in life. Even children at an early age have a preference of whom they want to interact with or form friendships with. Howes' (1983) research suggested that there are distinctive characteristics of friendships, for infants, toddlers, and pre-school-aged children.

== General References ==
- Cairney, John; Wade, Terrance J. (May 2002). "Single parent mothers and mental health care service use". Social Psychiatry and Psychiatric Epidemiology. 37 (5): 236–242. doi:10.1007/s00127-002-0539-6. PMID 12107716. S2CID 39744411.
- Campbell, Susan B.; Cohn, Jeffrey F.; Meyers, Teri (May 1995). "Depression in first-time mothers: Mother-infant interaction and depression chronicity". Developmental Psychology. 31 (3): 349–357. doi:10.1037/0012-1649.31.3.349.
- Davis, Owen (April 2019). "What is the Relationship between Benefit Conditionality and Mental Health? Evidence from the United States on TANF Policies". Journal of Social Policy. 48 (2): 249–269. doi:10.1017/S0047279418000363. S2CID 150006206.
- Eamon, Mary Keegan; Zuehl, Rachel M. (2001). "Maternal depression and physical punishment as mediators of the effect of poverty on socioemotional problems of children in single-mother families". American Journal of Orthopsychiatry. 71 (2): 218–226. doi:10.1037/0002-9432.71.2.218. PMID 11347362. ProQuest 61490196.
- Lipman, Ellen L.; Waymouth, Marjorie; Gammon, Tara; Carter, Patricia; Secord, Margaret; Leung, Olivia; Mills, Brenda; Hicks, Frances (October 2007). "Influence of group cohesion on maternal well-being among participants in a support/education group program for single mothers". American Journal of Orthopsychiatry. 77 (4): 543–549. doi:10.1037/0002-9432.77.4.543. PMID 18194034.
- "Supplemental Material for The Development of Self-Regulation Across Early Childhood". Developmental Psychology. 2016. doi:10.1037/dev0000159.supp.
- "Supplemental Material for Parenting Stress and Parent Support Among Mothers With High and Low Education". Journal of Family Psychology. 2015. doi:10.1037/fam0000129.supp.
- Zuravin, Susan J. (1989). "Severity of maternal depression and three types of mother-to-child aggression". American Journal of Orthopsychiatry. 59 (3): 377–389. doi:10.1111/j.1939-0025.1989.tb01673.x. PMID 2764072.
- Early Childhood Development Index 2030 (ECDI2030) - UNICEF DATA
