= Three mountain problem =

Psychological task developed by Jean Piaget

The Three Mountains Task was a task developed by Jean Piaget, a developmental psychologist from Switzerland. Piaget came up with a theory for developmental psychology based on cognitive development. Cognitive development, according to his theory, took place in four stages. These four stages were clasal and formal operational stages. The Three Mountain Problem was devised by Piaget to test whether a child's thinking was egocentric, which was also a helpful indicator of whether the child was in the preoperational stage or the concrete operational stage of cognitive development.

== Methods ==
Piaget's aim in the Three Mountain Problem was to investigate egocentrism in children's thinking. The original setup for the task was:

The child who is seated at a table where a model of three mountains is presented in front. The mountains were of different sizes, and they had different identifiers (one mountain had snow; one had a red cross on top; one had a hut on top). The child was allowed to do a 360 surveillance of the model. Upon having a good look at the model, a doll is placed at different vantage points relative to the child, and the child is shown 10 photographs. The child is to select which of the 10 photographs best reflects the doll's view. Children of different ages were tested using this task to determine the age at which children begin to 'decenter,' or take the perspective of others.

== Findings ==
The findings showed that at age 4, children would choose the photograph that best reflected with their own view. At age 6, an awareness of perspective different from their own could be seen. Then, by ages 7–8, children can clearly acknowledge more than one point of view and consistently select the correct photograph.

== During Preoperational Stage ==
A distinction can be made between children who are in the preoperational stage of cognitive development and the concrete operational stage. The prototypical child in the preoperational stage will fail the Three Mountain Problem task. The child will choose the photograph that best represents their own viewpoint, not that of the doll's.

What is implied is that the child's selection is based on egocentric thinking. Egocentric thinking is looking at the world from the child's point of view solely, thus "an egocentric child assumes that other people see, hear, and feel exactly the same as the child does.” This is consistent with the results for the preoperational age range as they selected photographs paralleling their own view.

On a similar note, these results helped Piaget home in on what age children show the capacity to decenter their thoughts, otherwise seen in a deviation away from egocentric thinking. Preoperational children have not achieved this yet; their thinking is centered, which is defined as a propensity to focus on one salient aspect or one dimension of a problem while simultaneously neglecting other potentially relevant aspects.

== During Concrete Operational Stage ==
The concept of centration is observed predominantly in children in the preoperational stage of cognitive development. Conversely, children in the concrete operational stage demonstrate decentration - an ability to recognize alternate point of views and a straying away from egocentric thinking. Piaget concluded that, by age 7, children were able to decenter their thoughts and acknowledge perspectives different than their own. This was evidenced by the consistent and correct selection of photographs by seven- and eight-year-olds in the 1956 study.

An example of a correct answer would be if the child and the doll were situated on the complete opposite sides of the mountain model with a tree on the child's side and a large mountain in the middle acting as a visual barrier. A preoperational child would claim that the doll could see the tree, whereas the concrete operational child would select a photograph without the tree since the mountain is large enough to block the tree from the doll's view. A concrete operational child would pass the Three Mountain Problem task.

== Follow Up Studies ==
There has been some criticism that the Three Mountain Problem was too difficult for the children to understand, compounded with the additional requirement of matching their answer to a photograph. Martin Hughes conducted a study in 1975 called the Policeman Doll Study. Two intersecting walls were used to create different quadrants, and “policeman" dolls were moved in various locations. The children were asked to hide another doll, a “boy” doll, away from both policemen's views. The results showed that among the sample of children ranging from ages 3.5-5, 90% gave correct answers. When the stakes were raised and additional walls and policeman dolls were added, 90% of four-year-olds were still able to pass the task. Hughes claimed that because this task made more sense to the child (with a primer session with one police doll to guarantee this), children were able to exhibit a loss of egocentric thinking as early as four years of age.

== Variations of the Three Mountain Problem ==
Common criticism of the Three Mountain Problem is about the complexity of the task. In 1975, another researcher by the name of Helen Borke replicated the task using a farm area with landmarks such as a lake, animals, people, trees, and a building. A character from Sesame Street, Grover, was put in a car, and he was driven around the area. When he stopped to "take a look at the scenery," children were asked what the landscape looked like from Grover's perspective. The results showed that children as young as three-years-old were able to perform well, and they showed evidence of perspective-taking, the ability to understand a situation from an alternate point of view. Hence, evaluation of Piaget's Three Mountain Problem has shown that using objects more familiar to the child and making the task less complex will produce different results than the original study.

== See also ==
- Egocentrism
- Centration
- Jean Piaget
- Developmental stage theories
- Piaget's theory of cognitive development
- Conservation
- Irreversibility
- Theory of Mind
