= Nicole McNeil =

American psychologist

Nicole M. McNeil is an American developmental psychologist and scholar of mathematics education whose research focuses on the cognitive development of mathematics in schoolchildren. She works at the University of Notre Dame as ACE College Professor in the Department of Psychology, fellow in the Institute for Educational Initiatives, adjunct faculty member in the Alliance for Catholic Education, director of the Cognition Learning and Development (CLAD) Laboratory, and Sweeney Family Director of the Center for Educational Research and Action.

== Education and career ==
McNeil majored in psychology, with a minor in chemistry, at Carnegie Mellon University. After graduating in 1999, she continued her studies at the University of Wisconsin–Madison, where she completed a Ph.D. in psychology in 2005.

Next, she became a postdoctoral researcher and director of the Center for the Psychology of Abilities, Competencies and Expertise (PACE Center) at Yale University from 2005 until 2006. In 2006, she joined the University of Notre Dame as an assistant professor of psychology. She was named as the Mary Hesburgh Flaherty and James Flaherty Assistant Professor in 2010, tenured as ACE Associate Professor in 2012, and promoted to full professor and ACE College Professor in 2017.

== Recognition ==
McNeil was a 2007 recipient of the Presidential Early Career Award for Scientists and Engineers. She was the 2013 recipient of the Boyd McCandless Award of the American Psychological Association for distinguished contributions to developmental psychology. In 2018 she was elected as a Fellow of the Association for Psychological Science.
