= Neo-Piagetian theories of cognitive development =

Theories in cognitive psychology

Neo-Piagetian theories of cognitive development criticize and build upon Jean Piaget's theory of cognitive development.

== Overview ==
The neo-Piagetian theories aim to correct one or more of the following weaknesses in Piaget's theory:

- Piaget's developmental stage theory proposes that people develop through various stages of cognitive development, but his theory does not sufficiently explain why development from stage to stage occurs. Mansoor Niaz has argued that Piaget's stages were merely a heuristic for operationalizing his theory of equilibration.
- Piaget's theory does not sufficiently explain individual differences in cognitive development. The theory does not account for the fact that some individuals move from stage to stage faster than other individuals.
- The idea of rigid universal stages of cognitive development is incorrect. Research shows that the functioning of a person at a given age varies significantly from domain to domain (such as the understanding of social, mathematical, or spatial concepts), that it is not possible to place the person in a single stage.

To correct these weaknesses of Piaget's theory, various researchers, who are known as neo-Piagetian theorists, produced models of cognitive development that integrate concepts from Piaget's theory with newer concepts from cognitive psychology and differential psychology.

== The theory of Juan Pascual-Leone ==
Initially, neo-Piagetian theorists explained cognitive growth along Piagetian stages by invoking information processing capacity as the cause of both development from one stage to the next and individual differences in developmental rate. Juan Pascual-Leone was the first to advance this approach.

Pascual-Leone argued that human thought is organized in two levels. This is outlined in the Theory of Constructive Operators (TCO).

1. The first and more basic level is defined by mental power or capacity. This level involves processes that define the volume and kind of information that the individual can process. Working memory is the functional manifestation of mental power. The capacity of working memory is usually specified in reference to the number of information chunks or units - the memory span - that one can keep in mind simultaneously at a given moment. Therefore memory span can be understood as the quantum of action of thought.
2. The second level involves mental content as such. That is, it involves concepts and schemes about the physical, the biological, and the social world, and the symbols we use to refer to them, such as words, numbers, mental images. It also involves the mental operations that we can carry on them, such as arithmetic operations on numbers, mental rotation on mental images, etc.

Pascual-Leone proposed that the increase of the number of mental units that one can represent simultaneously makes the persons able to handle more complex concepts. For instance, one needs to be able to hold two mental units in mind to be able to decide if one number is bigger than another number. To be able to add them, the person needs to be able to hold three units, that is, the two numbers plus the arithmetic operation to be applied, such as addition or subtraction. To be able to understand proportionality, one must be able to keep in mind five units, that is the two pairs of numbers to be compared and their relation.

According to Pascual-Leone, mental power is equal to 1 scheme, or unit of information, at 2–3 years of age and it increases by one unit every second year until it reaches its maximum of 7 units at 15 years of age. He studied 8,10,12 and 14 year olds and then adults and found that the development of short-term memory is because of capacity growth. He claimed that Piaget's, classical seven stages – pre-operational, intuitive, early concrete, late concrete, concrete-to-formal transitional, early formal and late formal thought – require a mental power of 7 mental units, respectively. Having a lesser degree of mental power than required by a task makes the solution of this task impossible, because the necessary relations cannot be represented and computed. Thus, each increase in mental power with age opens the way for the construction of concepts and skills to the new level of capacity. Falling short or exceeding the mental power that is typical of a given age, results in slower or faster rates of development, respectively.

== The theory of Robbie Case ==
Based on Pascual-Leone, several other researchers advanced alternative models of capacity development. Robbie Case rejected the idea that changes in processing capacity can be described as a progression along Pascual-Leone's single line of development. Instead, he maintained that processing capacity development recycles over a succession of four main stages and that each of them is characterized by a different kind of mental structures. These stages correspond to Piaget's main stages of sensorimotor, preoperational, concrete operational and formal operational thought. Each of these four stages involves its own executive control structures that are defined by the medium of representation and the type of relations that are possible at the stage.

=== Executive control structures ===
Executive control structures enable the person to:

1. represent the problem situation;
2. specify the objectives of problem solving;
3. conceive of the strategy needed to attain the objectives.

Case maintained that there are four types of executive control structures:

1. sensorimotor structures from 1 to 18 months of age (i.e., perceptions and actions such as seeing and grasping). There are 3 substages in this structure.
  - 4–8 months- Children find joy in objection movement and being able to control the movement.
  - 8–12 months- This is the substage children divide their attention between actions and reactions.
  - 12–18 months- In this substage the reversible relationships between an objects actions and reactions are introduced.
2. inter-relational structures from 18 months to 5 years of age (i.e., mental representations that stand for actual objects in the environment, such as words or mental images);
3. dimensional structures from 5 to 11 years (i.e., mental representations that are connected together by a consistent relation such that every particular case can be related to every other case, such as the mental number line where every number can be related to every other number);
4. vectorial structures from 11 to 19 years (i.e., relations between the dimensions of the previous stage, such as ratios and proportions which connect two or more dimensions with each other).

Case also argued that development within each of these four main stages evolves along the same sequence of the following four levels of complexity (thus, structures of increasing complexity can be handled at each of the four levels):

1. operational consolidation (when a particular mental unit specific to each of the four main stages above can be contemplated and handled, such as an action in the sensorimotor stage, a word in the relational stage, a number in the dimensional stage, etc.);
2. unifocal coordination, (when two such units may be interrelated);
3. bifocal coordination, (when three such units may be interrelated);
4. elaborated coordination, (when four such units may be interrelated).

According to Case, this expansion of the capacity of short-term storage space is caused by increasing operational efficiency. That is, the command of the operations that define each kind of executive control structures improves, thereby freeing space for the representation of goals and objectives. For example, counting becomes faster with age enabling children to keep more numbers in mind.

Successive stages are not unrelated, however. That is, the final level of a given stage is at the same time the first level of the following stage. For instance, when the concept of number is well established at the final level of elaborated coordination of the relational stage it enables children to view numbers as related to each other and this is equivalent to the first level of operational consolidation of the following dimensional stage. Thus, when the structures of a given stage reach a given level of complexity (which corresponds to the level of elaborated coordination) a new mental structure is created and the cycle starts up from the beginning.

=== Central conceptual structures ===
Case recognized that variations may occur in the organization and development of different domains, due to differences in how meaning is organized in each of the domains. Specifically, Case recognized that there are central conceptual structures. These are "networks of semantic notes and relations that have an extremely broad (but not system-wide) domain of application and that are central to children's functioning in that domain."

Case and his colleagues identified central conceptual structures for quantities, space, social behavior, narrative, music, and motor behavior. Each of these structures is supposed to involve a set of core processes and principles which serve to organize a broad array of situations; for example, the concept of more and less for quantities, adjacency and inclusion relationships for space, and actions and intentions for social behavior. Thus, these are very broad structures in which many executive control structures may be constructed, relative to an individual's experiences and needs.

For example, in the central conceptual structure that organizes quantities, executive control structures to solve arithmetic problems, to operate balance beams, to represent home locations according to their street address etc., may be constructed. In short, central conceptual structures function as frames and they provide the basic guiding principles and raw conceptual material for the construction of more locally focused concepts and action plans, when the need for them arises.

Learning the core elements of a central conceptual structure opens the way for fast acquisition of a wide array of executive control structures, although this does not generalize to other conceptual structures. It remains limited within the one affected, indicating that there may be variations both within and across individuals in the executive control structures that can be constructed within each central conceptual structure. These variations depend on the environmental support provided to each structure and on the individual's particular preferences and involvement.

== The theory of Graeme S. Halford ==
Graeme S. Halford raised a number of objections regarding Case's definition of working memory capacity and its role in cognitive growth. The main objection is that people may have the same problem, but it is represented differently and thus they may analyze the goals and objectives of the problem differently. Therefore, mental capacity cannot be specified in reference to executive functions. Halford proposed an alternative way to analyze the processing demands of problems that is supposed to explain the most crucial component of understanding and problem solving. This is the grasp of the network of relations that minimally and fully define a particular concept or problem.

According to Halford, this grasp is built through structure mapping. Structure mapping is analogical reasoning that people use to give meaning to problems by translating the givens of a problem into a representation or mental model that they already have and which allows them to understand the problem. The structure mappings that can be constructed depend upon the relational complexity of the structures they involve. The relational complexity of structures depends on the number of entities or the number of dimensions that are involved in the structure. The processing load of a task corresponds to the number of dimensions, which must be simultaneously represented, if their relations are to be understood.

For example, to understand any comparison between two entities (e.g., "larger than", "better than", etc.) one must be able to represent two entities and one relation between them. To understand a transitive relation one must be able to represent at least three entities (e.g., objects A, B, and C) and two relations (e.g., A is taller than B; C is shorter than B); otherwise it would not be possible to mentally arrange the entities in the right order that would reveal the relations between all entities involved.

Halford identified four levels of dimensionality.

1. The first is the level of unary relations or element mappings. Mappings at this level are constructed on the basis of a single attribute. For instance, the mental image of an apple is a valid representation of this fruit because it is similar to it.
2. The second is the level of binary relations or relational mappings. At this level two-dimensional concepts of the type "larger than" can be constructed. Thus, two elements connected by a given relation can be considered at this level.
3. The next is the level of system mappings, which requires that three elements or two relations must be considered simultaneously. At this level ternary relations or binary operations can be represented. The example of transitivity, which can be understood at this level, has already been explained above. The ability to solve simple arithmetic problems, where one term is missing, such as "3 + ? = 8" or "4 ? 2 = 8" also depends on system mappings, because all three known factors given must be considered simultaneously if the missing element or operation is to be specified.
4. At the final level multiple-system mappings can be constructed. At this level quaternary relations or relations between binary operations can be constructed. For example, problems with two unknowns (e.g., 2 ? 2 ? 4 = 4) or problems of proportionality, can be solved. That is, at this level four dimensions can be considered at once.

The four levels of structure mappings are thought to be attainable at the age of 1, 3, 5, and 10 years, respectively, and they correspond, in the theory of cognitive development of Piaget, to the sensorimotor, the preoperational, the concrete operational, and the formal operational, or Case's sensorimotor, interrelational, dimensional, and vectorial stage, respectively.

== The theory of Kurt W Fischer ==
Kurt W. Fischer advanced a theory that integrates Piaget's notion of stages in cognitive development with notions from learning theory and skill construction as explained by the cognitive psychology of the 1960s.

Fischer's conception of the stages of cognitive development is very similar to that of Case. That is, he describes four major stages or tiers which coincide by and large with Case's major stages. Thinking at each of the tiers operates with a different type of representation.

1. First is the tier of reflexes, which structures the basic reflexes constructed during the first month of life.
  - Single reflexes- 3–4 weeks
  - Mappings- 7–8 weeks
  - Systems- 10–11 weeks
2. Then it is the sensorimotor tier, which operates on perceptions and actions.
  - Single Action- 3–4 months
  - Mappings- 7–8 months
  - Systems- 11–13 months
3. The third is the representational tier, which operates on representations that are descriptive of reality.
  - Single Representations- 2 years
  - Mappings- 3.5- 4.5 years
  - Systems- 6–7 years
4. The fourth is the abstract tier, which operates on abstractions integrating the representations of the second tier.
  - Single Abstractions- 10–12 years
  - Mappings- 14–16 years
  - Systems- 18–20 years

Like Case, Fischer argues that development within each major stage recycles over the same sequence of four structurally identical levels.

1. At the first level of single sets individuals can construct skills involving only one element of the tier concerned, that is, sensorimotor sets, representational sets, or abstract sets.
2. At the level of mappings they can construct skills involving two elements mapped onto or coordinated with each other, that is, sensorimotor mappings, representational mappings, or abstract mappings.
3. At the level of systems they can construct skills integrating two mappings of the previous level, that is, sensorimotor systems, representational systems, or abstract systems.
4. At the level of systems of systems they can construct skills integrating two systems of the previous level, that is, sensorimotor systems of systems, representational systems of systems, or abstract systems of systems.

However, Fischer's theory differs from the other neo-Piagetian theories in a number of respects. One of them is in the way it explains cognitive change. Although Fischer does not deny the operation of information processing constrains on development, he emphasizes the environmental and social rather than individual factors as causes of development. To explain developmental change he borrowed two classic notions from Lev Vygotsky: internalization and the zone of proximal development.

Internalization refers to the processes that enable children to reconstruct and absorb the products of their observations and interactions in a way that makes them their own. That is, it is a process which transforms external, alien skills and concepts into internal, integral ones.

The zone of proximal development is Vygotsky's idea that at any age the child's potential for understanding and problem solving is not identical to his actual understanding and problem solving ability. Potential ability is always greater than actual ability: the zone of proximal development refers to the range of possibilities that exist between the actual and the potential. Structured interaction (scaffolding) and internalization are the processes that gradually allow potential (for understanding and problem solving) to become actual (concepts and skills).

Fischer argued that variations in the development and functioning of different mental skills and functions from the one domain to the other may be the rule rather than the exception. In his opinion these variations are to be attributed to differences in the experience that individuals have with different domains and also to differences in the support that they receive when interacting with the various domains. In addition, he posited that an individual's true level, which functions as a kind of ceiling for all domains, is the level of his potential, which can only be determined under conditions of maximum familiarity and scaffolding.

== The theory of Michael Commons ==
Michael Commons simplified and enhanced Piaget's developmental theory and offers a standard method of examining the universal pattern of development, named the model of hierarchical complexity (MHC). The model assesses a single measure of difficulty of inferred tasks across domains.

The MHC is a non-mentalistic model of developmental stages at which an individual is performing while completing a task. It specifies 16 orders of hierarchical complexity and their corresponding stages. Instead of attributing behavioral changes across a person's age to the development of mental structures or schema, this model posits that task sequences of task behaviors form hierarchies that become increasingly complex. The MHC separates the task from the performance. The participant's performance on a task of a given order of hierarchical complexity represents the developmental stage. Because less hierarchically complex tasks must be completed and practiced before more complex tasks can be acquired, this accounts for the developmental changes seen, for example, in individual persons' performance of more hierarchically complex tasks.

=== Subtasks and subtask actions ===
Within an order of hierarchical complexity, a person must count before they add (subtask 1). Note that this only requires one previous task action be acquired. They must add (subtask 2) before they multiply (subtask 3). The concrete order of hierarchical complexity requires the two primary order addition and primary order multiplication to be coordinated as with long multiplication or distributivity. Furthermore, previous theories of stage have confounded the stimulus and response in assessing stage by simply scoring responses and ignoring the task or stimulus.

In the MHC, there are three axioms for an order to meet in order for the higher order task to coordinate the next lower order task. Axioms are rules that are followed to determine how the MHC orders actions to form a hierarchy. These axioms are:

1. Defined in terms of tasks at the next lower order of hierarchical complexity task action;
2. Defined as the higher order task action that organizes two or more less complex actions; that is, the more complex action specifies the way in which the less complex actions combine;
3. Defined as the lower order task actions have to be carried out non-arbitrarily.

These axioms make it possible for the model's application to meet real world requirements, including the empirical and analytic. Arbitrary organization of lower order of complexity actions, possible in the Piagetian theory, despite the hierarchical definition structure, leaves the functional correlates of the interrelationships of tasks of differential complexity formulations ill-defined. Moreover, the model is consistent with the other neo-Piagetian theories of cognitive development. According to these theories, progression to higher stages or levels of cognitive development is caused by increases in processing efficiency and working memory capacity. That is, higher-order stages place increasingly higher demands on these functions of information processing, so that their order of appearance reflects the information processing possibilities at successive ages.

=== Similarities and difference between Commons' model and others ===
There are some commonalities between the Piagetian and Commons' notions of stage and many more things that are different. In both, one finds:

1. Higher-order actions defined in terms of lower-order actions. This forces the hierarchical nature of the relations and makes the higher-order tasks include the lower ones and requires that lower-order actions are hierarchically contained within the relative definitions of the higher-order tasks.
2. Higher-order of complexity actions organize those lower-order actions. This makes them more powerful. Lower-order actions are organized by the actions with a higher order of complexity, i.e., the more complex tasks.

What Commons et al. have added includes:

1. Higher order of complexity actions organize those lower-order actions in a non-arbitrary way.
2. Task and performance are separated.
3. All tasks have an order of hierarchical complexity.
4. There is only one sequence of orders of hierarchical complexity.
5. Hence, there is structure of the whole for ideal task actions.
6. There are gaps between the orders of hierarchical complexity.
7. Stage is most hierarchically complex task solved.
8. There are gaps in Rasch scaled stage of performance.
9. Performance stage is different task area to task area.
10. There is no structure of the whole—horizontal decaláge—for performance.
11. It is not inconsistency in thinking within a developmental stage.
12. Decaláge is the normal modal state of affairs.
13. Between early preoperations and preoperations, the "sentential stage" suggested by Fischer based on Biggs and Biggs has been added.

The five highest stages in the MHC are not represented in Piaget's model. They are systematic, metasystematic, paradigmatic, crossparadigmatic and metacrossparadigmatic. Only about 20% of the people perform at the systematic stage 11 without support. Even fewer (1.5%) of individuals perform at stages above the systematic stage. In the stages beyond formal, more complex behaviors characterize multiple system models.

Some adults are said to develop alternatives to, and perspectives on, formal stage actions. They use formal actions within a "higher" system of actions and transcend the limitations of formal stage actions. In any case, these are all ways in which these theories argue for and present converging evidence that some adults are using forms of reasoning that are more complex than formal with which Piaget's model ended. However, these new innovations cannot exactly be labelled as postformal thought.

=== Stage comparison of different theories ===
Order of hierarchical complexity, Commons et al. (1998)	Fischer's stages of cognitive development (Fischer & Bidell, 1998)	Piaget & Inhelder's stages of cognitive development (1969)	9-point scale of moral judgment, Colby and Kohlberg (1987)
0 Calculatory			
1 Automatic			
2 Sensory	0		-1
3 Circular sensory motor	1	a Sensorimotor	0/-1
4 Sensory motor	2	b Sensorimotor	0
5 Nominal	3	Ia Preoperational	0/1
6 Sentential	3-4		1
7 Preoperational	4	Ib Preoperational	1/2
8 Primary	5	IIa Preoperational	2
9 Concrete	6	IIb Concrete Operational	2/3
10 Abstract	7	IIIa Concrete Operational	3
11 Formal	8	IIIb Formal Operational	3/4
12 Systematic	9	IIIc Formal Operational	4
13 Metasystematic	10	Postformal	5
14 Paradigmatic	11	Postformal	6
15 Cross-paradigmatic	12	Postformal	7
16 Meta-paradigmatic			

== The theory of Andreas Demetriou ==
The models above do not systematically elaborate on the differences between domains, the role of self-awareness in development, and the role of other aspects of processing efficiency, such as speed of processing and cognitive control. In the theory proposed by Andreas Demetriou, with his colleagues, all of these factors are systematically studied.

According to Demetriou's theory, the human mind is organized in three functional levels. The first is the level of processing potentials, which involves information processing mechanisms underlying the ability to attend to, select, represent, and operate on information. The other two levels involve knowing processes, one oriented to the environment and another oriented to the self. This model is graphically depicted in Figure 1.

Figure 1: The general model of the architecture of the developing mind integrating concepts from the theories of Demetriou and Case.

=== Processing potentials ===
Mental functioning at any moment occurs under the constraints of the processing potentials that are available at a given age. Processing potentials are specified in terms of three dimensions: speed of processing, control of processing, and representational capacity.

Speed of processing refers to the maximum speed at which a given mental act may be efficiently executed. It is measured in reference to the reaction time to very simple tasks, such as the time needed to recognize an object.

Control of processing involves executive functions that enable the person to keep the mind focused on a goal, protect attention of being captured by irrelevant stimuli, timely shift focus to other relevant information if required, and inhibit irrelevant or premature responses, so that a strategic plan of action can be made and sustained. Reaction time to situations where one must choose between two or more alternatives is one measure of control of processing. Stroop effect tasks are good measures of control of processing.

Representational capacity refers to the various aspects of mental power or working memory mentioned above.

=== Domain-specific systems of thought ===
The level oriented to the environment includes representational and understanding processes and functions that specialize in the representation and processing of information coming from different domains of the environment. Six such environment-oriented systems are described:

1. The categorical system enables categorizations of objects or persons on the basis of their similarities and differences. Forming hierarchies of interrelated concepts about class relationships is an example of the domain of this system. For instance, the general class of plants includes the classes of fruits and vegetables, which, in turn, include the classes of apples and lettuce, etc.
2. The quantitative system deals with quantitative variations and relations in the environment. Mathematical concepts and operations are examples of the domain of this system.
3. The causal system deals with cause-effect relations. Operations such as trial-and-error or isolation of variable strategies that enable a person to decipher the causal relations between things or persons and ensuing causal concepts and attributions belong to this system.
4. The spatial system deals with orientation in space and the imaginal representation of the environment. Our mental maps of our city or the mental images of familiar persons and objects and operations on them, such as mental rotation, belong to this system.
5. The propositional system deals with the truth/falsity and the validity/invalidity of statements or representations about the environment. Different types of logical relationships, such as implication (if ... then) and conjunction (and ... and) belong to this system.
6. The social system deals with the understanding of social relationships and interactions. Mechanisms for monitoring non-verbal communication or skills for manipulating social interactions belong to this system. This system also includes understanding the general moral principles specifying what is acceptable and what is unacceptable in human relations.

The domain specificity of these systems implies that the mental processes differ from the one system to the other. Compare, for instance, arithmetic operations in the quantitative system with mental rotation in the spatial system. The first require the thinker to relate quantities; the other require the transformation of the orientation of an object in space. Moreover, the different systems require different kinds of symbols to represent and operate on their objects. These differences make it difficult to equate the concepts and operations across the various systems in the mental load they impose on representational capacity, as the models above assume. Case also recognized that concepts and executive control structures differ across domains in the semantic networks that they involve. Case and Demetriou worked together to unify their analysis of domains. They suggested that Demetriou's domains may be specified in terms of Case's central conceptual structures.

=== Hypercognition ===
The third level includes functions and processes oriented to monitoring, representing, and regulating the environment-oriented systems. The input to this level is information arising from the functioning of processing potentials and the environment-oriented systems, for example, sensations, feelings, and conceptions caused by mental activity. The term hypercognition was used to refer to this level and denote the effects that it exerts on the other two levels of the mind. Hypercognition involves two central functions, namely working hypercognition and long-term hypercognition.

Working hypercognition is a strong directive-executive function that is responsible for setting and pursuing mental and behavioral goals until they are attained. This function involves processes enabling the person to: (1) set mental and behavioral goals; (2) plan their attainment; (3) evaluate each step's processing demands vis-à-vis the available potentials, knowledge, skills and strategies; (4) monitor planned activities vis-à-vis the goals; and (5) evaluate the outcome attained. These processes operate recursively in such a way that goals and subgoals may be renewed according to the online evaluation of the system's distance from its ultimate objective. These regulatory functions operate under the current structural constraints of the mind that define the current processing potentials. Recent research suggests that these processes participate in general intelligence together with processing potentials and the general inferential processes used by the specialized thought domains described above.

Consciousness is an integral part of the hypercognitive system. The very process of setting mental goals, planning their attainment, monitoring action vis-à-vis both the goals and the plans, and regulating real or mental action requires a system that can remember and review and therefore know itself. Therefore, conscious awareness and all ensuing functions, such as a self-concept (i.e., awareness of one's own mental characteristics, functions, and mental states) and a theory of mind (i.e., awareness of others' mental functions and states) are part of the very construction of the system.

In fact, long-term hypercognition gradually builds maps or models of mental functions which are continuously updated. These maps are generally accurate representations of the actual organization of cognitive processes in the domains mentioned above. When needed, they can be used to guide problem solving and understanding in the future. Optimum performance at any time depends on the interaction between actual problem solving processes specific to a domain and our representations of them. The interaction between the two levels of mind ensures flexibility of behavior, because the self-oriented level provides the possibility for representing alternative environment-oriented representations and actions and thus it provides the possibility for planning.

=== Development ===
All of the processes mentioned above develop systematically with age.

Speed of processing increases systematically from early childhood to middle age and it then starts to decrease again. For instance, to recognize a very simple object takes about 750 milliseconds at the age of 6 years and only about 450 milliseconds in early adulthood.

Control of processing and executive control also become more efficient and capable of allowing the person to focus on more complex information, hold attention for longer periods of time, and alternate between increasingly larger stacks of stimuli and responses while filtering out irrelevant information. For instance, to recognize a particular stimulus among conflicting information may take about 2000 milliseconds at the age of 6 years and only about 750 milliseconds in early adulthood.

All components of working memory (e.g., executive functions, numerical, phonological and visuospatial storage) increase with age. However, the exact capacity of working memory varies greatly depending upon the nature of information. For example, in the spatial domain, they may vary from 3 units at the age of six to 5 units at the age of 12 years. In the domain of mathematical thought, they may vary from about 2 to about 4 units in the same age period. If executive operations are required, the capacity is extensively limited, varying from about 1 unit at 6 to about 3 units at 12 years of age. Demetriou proposed the functional shift model to account for these data.

Demetriou's model presumes that when the mental units of a given level reach a maximum degree of complexity, the mind tends to reorganize these units at a higher level of representation or integration so as to make them more manageable. Having created a new mental unit, the mind prefers to work with this rather than the previous units due to its functional advantages. An example in the verbal domain would be the shift from words to sentences and in the quantitative domain from natural numbers to algebraic representations of numerical relations. The functional shift models explains how new units are created leading to stage change in the fashion described by Case and Halford.

The specialized domains develop through the life span both in terms of general trends and in terms of the typical characteristics of each domain. In the age span from birth to middle adolescence, the changes are faster in all of the domains. With development, thought in each of the domains becomes able to deal with increasingly more representations. Representations become increasingly interconnected with each other and they acquire their meaning from their interrelations rather than simply their relations with concrete objects. As a result, concepts in each of the domains become increasingly defined in reference to rules and general principles bridging more local concepts and creating new, broader, and more abstract concepts. Understanding and problem solving in each of the domains evolve from global and less integrated to differentiated, but better integrated, mental operations. As a result, planning and operation from alternatives becomes increasingly part of the person's functioning, as well as the increasing ability to efficiently monitor the problem solving process. This offers flexibility in cognitive functioning and problem solving across the whole spectrum of specialized domains.

In the hypercognitive system, self-awareness and self-regulation, that is, the ability to regulate one's own cognitive activity, develop systematically with age. Self-awareness of cognitive processes becomes more accurate and shifts from the external and superficial characteristics of problems (e.g., this is about numbers and this is about pictures) to the cognitive processes involved (e.g., the one requires addition and the other requires mental rotation). Moreover, developing self-representations:

1. involve more dimensions which are better integrated into increasingly more complex structures;
2. move along a concrete (e.g., I am fast and strong) to abstract (e.g., I am able) continuum so that they become increasingly more abstract and flexible; and
3. become more accurate in regard to the actual characteristics and abilities to which they refer (i.e., persons know where they are cognitively strong and where they are weak).

The knowledge available at each phase defines the kind of self-regulation that can be achieved. Thus, self-regulation becomes increasingly focused, refined, efficient, and strategic. Practically this implies that our information processing capabilities come under increasing a priori control of our long-term hypercognitive maps and our self-definitions. As we move into middle age, intellectual development gradually shifts from the dominance of systems that are oriented to the processing of the environment (such as spatial and propositional reasoning) to systems that require social support and self-understanding and management (social understanding). Thus, the transition to mature adulthood makes persons intellectually stronger and more self-aware of their strengths.

There are strong developmental relations between the various processes, such that changes at any level of organization of the mind open the way for changes in other levels. Specifically, changes in speed of processing open the way for changes in the various forms of control of processing. These, in turn, open the way for the enhancement of working memory capacity, which subsequently opens the way for development in inferential processes, and the development of the various specialized domains through the reorganization of domain-specific skills, strategies, and knowledge and the acquisition of new ones.

There are top-down effects as well. That is, general inference patterns, such as implication (if ... then inferences), or disjunction (either ... or inferences), are constructed by mapping domain-specific inference patterns onto each other through the hypercognitive process of metarepresentation. Metarepresentation is the primary top-down mechanism of cognitive change which looks for, codifies, and typifies similarities between mental experiences (past or present) to enhance understanding and problem-solving efficiency. In logical terms, metarepresentation is analogical reasoning applied to mental experiences or operations, rather than to representations of environmental stimuli. For example, if ... then sentences are heard over many occasions in everyday language: if you are a good child then I will give you a toy; if it rains and you stay out then you become wet; if the glass falls on the floor then it breaks in pieces; etc. When a child realizes that the sequencing of the if ... then connectives in language is associated with situations in which the event or thing specified by if always comes first and it leads to the event or thing specified by then, this child is actually formulating the inference schema of implication. With development, the schema becomes a reasoning frame for predictions and interpretations of actual events or conversations about them.

Recently, it has been suggested that the development of all systems is concerted in four reconceptualization cycles. These are the cycles of episodic representations (birth to 2 years), representations (2–6 years), rule-based concepts (6–11 years), and principle-based concepts (11–16 years). Each cycle evolves in two phases: The phase of production of new mental units in the first half and their alignment in the second half. This sequence relates with changes in processing speed and working memory in overlapping cycles such that relations with speed are high in the production phases and relations with WM are high in the alignment phases over all cycles. Reconceptualization is self-propelled because abstraction, alignment, and self-awareness about the cycle's mental representations and mental processes continuously generate new mental content expressed in representations of increasing inclusiveness and resolution. Each cycle culminates into insight about the cycle's representations and underlying inferential processes that is expressed into executive programs of increasing flexibility. Learning addressed to this insight accelerates the course of reconceptualization. Individual differences in intellectual growth are related to both the ability to gain insight about mental processes and interaction with different specialized domains (e.g., categorical, quantitative, spatial cognition, etc.).

=== Brain and cognitive development ===
Brain research shows that some general aspects of the brain, such as myelination, plasticity, and connectivity of neurons, are related to some dimensions of general intelligence, such as speed of processing and learning efficiency. Moreover, there are brain regions, located mainly in the frontal and parietal cortex that subserve functions that are central to all cognitive processing, such as executive control, and working memory. Also, there are many neural networks that specialize in the representation of different types of information such as verbal (temporal lobe of the brain), spatial (occipital lobe of the brain) or quantitative information (parietal lobe of the brain).

Several aspects of neural development are related to cognitive development. For example, increases in the myelination of neuronal axons, which protect the transmission of electrical signalling along the axons from leakage, are related to changes in general processing efficiency. This, in turn, enhances the capacity of working memory, thereby facilitating transition across the stages of cognitive development.

Changes within stages of cognitive development are associated with improvements in neuronal connectivity within brain regions whereas transitions across stages are associated with improvements in connectivity between brain regions. Electroencephalographic coherency patterns throughout childhood and adolescence develop in growth spurts that are nearly identical to the time frame of the developmental cycles described above.

Changes in the efficiency of the brain to represent information and allocate mental functions to brain networks (such as metabolic activity and cortical specialization and pruning) may occur mainly at the early phase of each cycle that are associated with an increase in the speed-intelligence relations (2–3, 6–7, and 11–13 years). Changes in connectivity that may relate to mapping concepts onto each other and meta-represent them into new concepts occur at second phase of each cycle associated with an increase in the working memory–intelligence relations.

== Dynamic systems theory ==
In recent years, there has been an increasing interest in theories and methods that show promise for capturing and modeling the regularities underlying multiple interacting and changing processes. Dynamic systems theory is one of them. Many theorists, including Case, Demetriou, and Fischer, used dynamic systems modeling to investigate and explore the dynamic relations between cognitive processes during development.

When multiple processes interact in complex ways, they very often appear to behave unsystematically and unpredictably. In fact, however, they are interconnected in systematic ways, such that the condition of one process at a given point of time t (for example, speed of processing) is responsible for the condition of another process (for example working memory), at a next point of time t + 1, and together they determine the condition of a third process (for example thought), at a time t + 2, which then influences the conditions of the other two processes at a time t + 3, etc. Dynamic systems theory can reveal and model the dynamic relationships among different processes and specify the forms of development that result from different types of interaction among processes. The aim is to explain the order and systematicity that exist beneath a surface of apparent disorder or "chaos".

Paul van Geert was the first to show the promise that dynamic systems theory holds for the understanding of cognitive development. Van Geert assumed that the basic growth model is the so-called "logistic growth model", which suggests that the development of mental processes follows an S-like pattern of change. That is, at the beginning, change is very slow and hardly noticeable; after a given point in time, however, it occurs very rapidly so that the process or ability spurts to a much higher level in a relatively short period of time; finally, as this process approaches its end state, change decelerates until it stabilizes.

According to Paul van Geert, logistic growth is a function of three parameters: the present level, the rate of change, and a limit on the level that can be reached that depends on the available resources for the functioning of the process under consideration.

1. The first parameter (the present level) indicates the potential that a process has for further development. Obviously, the further away a process is from its end state the more its potential of change would be.
2. The second parameter (the rate of change) is an augmenting or multiplying factor applied to the present level. This may come from pressures for change from the environment or internal drives or motives for improvement. It operates like the interest rate applied to a no-withdrawal savings account. That is, this is a factor that indicates the rate at which an ability changes in order to approach its end state.
3. The third parameter (the limit) refers to the resources available for development. For example, the working memory available is the resource for the development of cognitive processes which may belong to any domain.

== Student development theories ==
Educational psychologists have also expanded the field into the study of student development. Some important theorists in this field include Arthur W. Chickering and William G. Perry.

Arthur W. Chickering taught that students want to learn because of future success in career and life. Developing cognitive and critical think skills are important in preparing students all success. A way to bring self-confidence and competence is done by having a purpose in all their actions they take and what motivates them.

== Relations between theories ==
Pascual-Leone, Case, and Halford attempt to explain development along the sequence of Piagetian stages and substages. Pascual-Leone aligned this sequence with a single line of development of mental power that goes from one to seven mental units. Case suggested that each of four main stages involves different kinds of mental structures and he specified the mental load of the successive levels or substages of complexity within each of the main stages. He said that there may be different central conceptual structures within each level of executive control structures that differ between each other in reference to the concepts and semantic relations involved. Halford attempted to specify the cognitive load of the mental structure that is typical of each of the main stages. Fischer stressed the importance of skill construction processes in building stage-like constructs and he emphasized the role of the environment and social support in skill construction. Commons offered a description of the successive levels of cognitive development while allowing for the explicit reference to the particularities of concepts and operations specific to each of the domains. Demetriou integrated into his theory the constructs of speed of processing and control of processing, and he formulated the functional shift model, which unifies Pascual-Leone's notion of underlying common dimension of capacity development with the notion of qualitative changes in mental structure as development progresses along this dimension. Dynamic systems theory can model how different processes interact dynamically when developmental hierarachies are built.

== Relation to intelligence ==
It is suggested that fluid intelligence, that is the general mechanisms underlying learning, problem solving, and the handling of novelty, depends on these developmental processes. Changes in these mechanisms seem able to explain, to a considerable extent, the changes in the quality of understanding and problem solving at successive age levels.

An overarching definition of intelligence can be as follows: The more mentally efficient (that is, the faster and the more focused one works towards a goal), capable (that is, the more information one can hold in mind at a given moment), foresighted (that is, the more clearly one can specify one's goals and plan how to achieve them), and flexible (that is, the more one can introduce variations in the concepts and mental operations one already possesses) a person is, the more intelligent we call that person (both in comparison to other individuals and in regard to a general developmental hierarchy).

Differences between persons in IQ, or in the rate of development, result additively from differences in all of the processes modeled in the neo-Piagetian theories. Thus, the neo-Piagetian theories differ from Arthur Jensen's theory of general intelligence in that they recognize the importance of specialized domains in the human mind, which are underestimated in Jensen's theory. On the other hand, by recognizing the role of general processes and showing how specialized competences are constrained by them, the neo-Piagetian theories differ from Howard Gardner's theory of multiple intelligences, which underestimates the operation of common processes.

== Implications for education ==
Education and the psychology of cognitive development converge on a number of crucial assumptions. First, the psychology of cognitive development defines human cognitive competence at successive phases of development. That is, it specifies what aspects of the world can be understood at different ages, what kinds of concepts can be constructed, and what types of problems can be solved. Education aims to help students acquire knowledge and develop skills which are compatible with their understanding and problem-solving capabilities at different ages. Thus, knowing the students' level on a developmental sequence provides information on the kind and level of knowledge they can assimilate, which, in turn, can be used as a frame for organizing the subject matter to be taught at different school grades. This is the reason why Piaget's theory of cognitive development was so influential for education, especially mathematics and science education.

In the 60s and the 70s, school curricula were designed to implement Piaget's ideas in the classroom. For example, in mathematics, teaching must build on the stage sequence of mathematical understanding. Thus, in preschool and early primary (elementary) school, teaching must focus on building the concept of numbers, because concepts are still unstable and uncoordinated. In the late primary school years operations on numbers must be mastered because concrete operational thought provides the mental background for this. In adolescence the relations between numbers and algebra can be taught, because formal operational thought allows for conception and manipulation of abstract and multidimensional concepts. In science teaching, early primary education should familiarize the children with properties of the natural world, late primary education should lead the children to practice exploration and master basic concepts such as space, area, time, weight, volume, etc., and, in adolescence, hypothesis testing, controlled experimentation, and abstract concepts, such as energy, inertia, etc., can be taught.

The neo-Piagetian theories of cognitive development suggest that in addition to the concerns above, sequencing of concepts and skills in teaching must take account of the processing and working memory capacities that characterize successive age levels. In other words, the overall structure of the curriculum across time, in any field, must reflect the developmental processing and representational possibilities of the students as specified by all of the theories summarized above. This is necessary because when understanding of the concepts to be taught at a given age requires more than the available capacity, the necessary relations cannot be worked out by the student. In fact, Demetriou has shown that speed of processing and working memory are excellent predictors of school performance.

Effective teaching methods have to enable the student to move from a lower to a higher level of understanding or abandon less efficient skills for more efficient ones. Therefore, knowledge of change mechanisms can be used as a basis for designing instructional interventions that will be both subject- and age-appropriate. Comparison of past to present knowledge, reflection on actual or mental actions vis-à-vis alternative solutions to problems, tagging new concepts or solutions to symbols that help one recall and mentally manipulate them, are just a few examples of how mechanisms of cognitive development may be used to facilitate learning. For example, to support metarepresentation and facilitate the emergence of general reasoning patterns from domain specific processing, teaching must continually raise awareness in students of what may be abstracted from any particular domain-specific learning. The student must be led to become aware of the underlying relations that surpass content differences and of the very mental processes used while handling them (for instance, elaborate on how particular inference schemas, such as implication, operate in different domains).

The psychology of cognitive development is concerned with individual differences in the organization of cognitive processes and abilities, in their rate of change, and in their mechanisms of change. The principles underlying intra- and inter-individual differences could be educationally useful, because it highlights why the same student is not an equally good learner in different domains, and why different students in the same classroom react to the same instructional materials in different ways.

Identifying individual differences with regard to the various aspects of cognitive development could be the basis for the development of programs of individualized instruction which may focus on the gifted student or which may be of a remedial nature.

== See also ==
- Student development theories
- Annette Karmiloff-Smith
- Esther Thelen
- John H. Flavell
- Les Greenberg
- Reuven Feuerstein
- Vittorio Guidano
