= Piaget's theory of cognitive development =

Theory that discusses human intelligence from an epistemological perspective

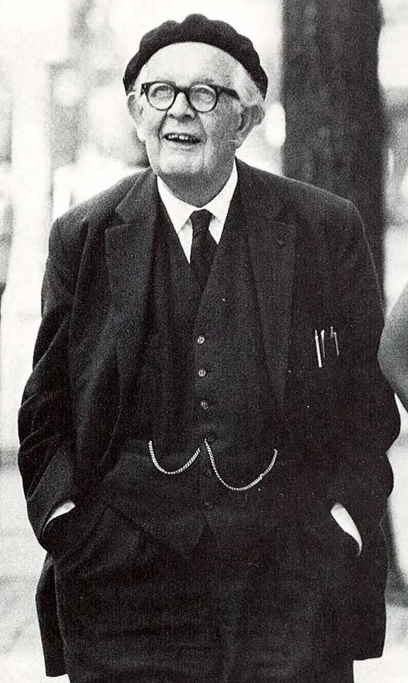
Jean Piaget in Ann Arbor

Piaget's theory of cognitive development, or his genetic epistemology, is a comprehensive theory about the nature and development of human intelligence. It was originated by the Swiss developmental psychologist Jean Piaget (1896–1980). The theory deals with the nature of knowledge itself and how humans gradually come to acquire, construct, and use it. Piaget's theory is mainly known as a developmental stage theory.

In 1919, while working at the Alfred Binet Laboratory School in Paris, Piaget "was intrigued by the fact that children of different ages made different kinds of mistakes while solving problems". His experience and observations at the Alfred Binet Laboratory were the beginnings of his theory of cognitive development.

He believed that children of different ages made different mistakes because of the "quality rather than quantity" of their intelligence. Piaget proposed four stages to describe the cognitive development of children: the sensorimotor stage, the preoperational stage, the concrete operational stage, and the formal operational stage. Each stage describes a specific age group. In each stage, he described how children develop their cognitive skills. For example, he believed children experience the world through action, represent things with words, think logically, and use reasoning.

To Piaget, cognitive development was a progressive reorganisation of mental processes resulting from biological maturation and environmental experience. He believed children construct an understanding of the world around them, notice discrepancies between what they already know and what they discover in their environment, and adjust their ideas accordingly. Moreover, Piaget claimed that cognitive development is at the centre of the human organism, and language is contingent on knowledge and understanding acquired through cognitive development. Piaget's earlier work received the greatest attention.

Child-centred classrooms and "open education" directly apply Piaget's views. Despite its huge success, Piaget's theory has some limitations that Piaget recognised himself: for example, the theory supports sharp stages rather than continuous development (horizontal and vertical décalage).

== Nature of intelligence: operative and figurative ==
Piaget argued that reality is a construction. Reality is defined by the two conditions that define dynamic systems. Specifically, he argued that reality involves transformations and states. Transformations refer to all manners of changes that a thing or person can undergo. States refer to the conditions or the appearances in which things or persons can be found between transformations. For example, there might be changes in shape or form (for instance, liquids are reshaped as they are transferred from one vessel to another, and similarly humans change in their characteristics as they grow older), in size (a toddler does not walk and run without falling, but after 7 years of age, the child's sensorimotor anatomy is well developed and now acquires skills faster), or in placement or location in space and time (e.g., various objects or persons might be found at one place at one time and at a different place at another time). Thus, Piaget argued, if human intelligence is to be adaptive, it must have functions to represent both the transformational and the static aspects of reality. He proposed that operative intelligence is responsible for the representation and manipulation of the dynamic or transformational aspects of reality, and that figurative intelligence is responsible for the representation of the static aspects of reality.

Operative intelligence is the active aspect of intelligence. It involves all actions, overt or covert, undertaken in order to follow, recover, or anticipate the transformations of the objects or persons of interest. Figurative intelligence is the more or less static aspect of intelligence, involving all means of representation used to retain in mind the states (i.e., successive forms, shapes, or locations) that intervene between transformations. That is, it involves perception, imitation, mental imagery, drawing, and language. Therefore, the figurative aspects of intelligence derive their meaning from the operative aspects of intelligence, because states cannot exist independently of the transformations that interconnect them. Piaget stated that the figurative, or representational, aspects of intelligence are subservient to its operative and dynamic aspects and therefore that understanding essentially derives from the operative aspect of intelligence.

At any time, operative intelligence frames how the world is understood, and it changes if understanding is not successful. Piaget stated that this process of understanding and change involves two basic functions: assimilation and accommodation.

=== Assimilation and accommodation ===
Through his study of the field of education, Piaget focused on two processes, which he named assimilation and accommodation. To Piaget, assimilation meant integrating external elements into structures of life or environments, or those we could have through experience. Assimilation is how humans perceive and adapt to new information. It is the process of fitting new information into pre-existing cognitive schemas. Assimilation in which new experiences are reinterpreted to fit into, or assimilate with, old ideas and analyzing new facts accordingly. It occurs when humans are faced with new or unfamiliar information and refer to previously learned information in order to make sense of it. In contrast, accommodation is the process of taking new information in one's environment and altering pre-existing schemas in order to fit in the new information. This happens when the existing schema (knowledge) does not work, and needs to be changed to deal with a new object or situation. Accommodation is imperative because it is how people will continue to interpret new concepts, schemas, frameworks, and more.

Various teaching methods have been developed based on Piaget's insights that call for the use of questioning and inquiry-based education to help learners more blatantly face the sorts of contradictions to their pre-existing schemas that are conducive to learning.

Piaget believed that the human brain has been programmed through evolution to bring equilibrium, which is what he believed ultimately influences structures by the internal and external processes through assimilation and accommodation.

Piaget's understanding was that assimilation and accommodation cannot exist without the other. They are two sides of a coin. To assimilate an object into an existing mental schema, one first needs to take into account or accommodate to the particularities of this object to a certain extent. For instance, to recognize (assimilate) an apple as an apple, one must first focus (accommodate) on the contour of this object. To do this, one needs to roughly recognize the size of the object. Development increases the balance, or equilibration, between these two functions. When in balance with each other, assimilation and accommodation generate mental schemas of the operative intelligence. When one function dominates over the other, they generate representations which belong to figurative intelligence.

=== Cognitive equilibration ===
Piaget agreed with most other developmental psychologists in that there are three very important factors that are attributed to development: maturation, experience, and the social environment. But where his theory differs involves his addition of a fourth factor, equilibration, which "refers to the organism's attempt to keep its cognitive schemes in balance". Also see Piaget, and Boom's detailed account.

Equilibration is the motivational element that guides cognitive development. As humans, we have a biological need to make sense of the things we encounter in every aspect of our world in order to muster a greater understanding of it, and therefore, to flourish in it. This is where the concept of equilibration comes into play. If a child is confronted with information that does not fit into his or her previously held schemes, disequilibrium is said to occur. This, as one would imagine, is unsatisfactory to the child, so he or she will try to fix it. The incongruence will be fixed in one of three ways. The child will either ignore the newly discovered information, assimilate the information into a preexisting scheme, or accommodate the information by modifying a different scheme. Using any of these methods will return the child to a state of equilibrium, however, depending on the information being presented to the child, that state of equilibrium is not likely to be permanent.

For example, let's say Dave, a three-year-old boy who has grown up on a farm and is accustomed to seeing Horses regularly, has been brought to the zoo by his parents and sees an Elephant for the first time. Immediately he shouts "look mommy, Horsey!" Because Dave does not have a scheme for Elephants, he interprets the Elephant as being a Horse due to its large size, color, tail, and long face. He believes the Elephant is a Horse until his mother corrects. The new information Dave has received has put him in a state of disequilibrium. He now has to do one of three things. He can either: (1) turn his head, move towards another section of animals, and ignore this newly presented information; (2) distort the defining characteristics of an Elephant so that he can assimilate it into his "Horsey" scheme; or (3) he can modify his preexisting "Animal" schema to accommodate this new information regarding Elephants by slightly altering his knowledge of animals as he knows them.

With age comes entry into a higher stage of development. With that being said, previously held schemes (and the children that hold them) are more than likely to be confronted with discrepant information the older they get. Silverman and Geiringer propose that one would be more successful in attempting to change a child's mode of thought by exposing that child to concepts that reflect a higher rather than a lower stage of development. Furthermore, children are better influenced by modeled performances that are one stage above their developmental level, as opposed to modeled performances that are either lower or two or more stages above their level.

== Four stages of development ==
In his theory of cognitive development, Jean Piaget proposed that humans progress through four developmental stages: the sensorimotor stage, preoperational stage, concrete operational stage, and formal operational stage.

=== Sensorimotor stage ===
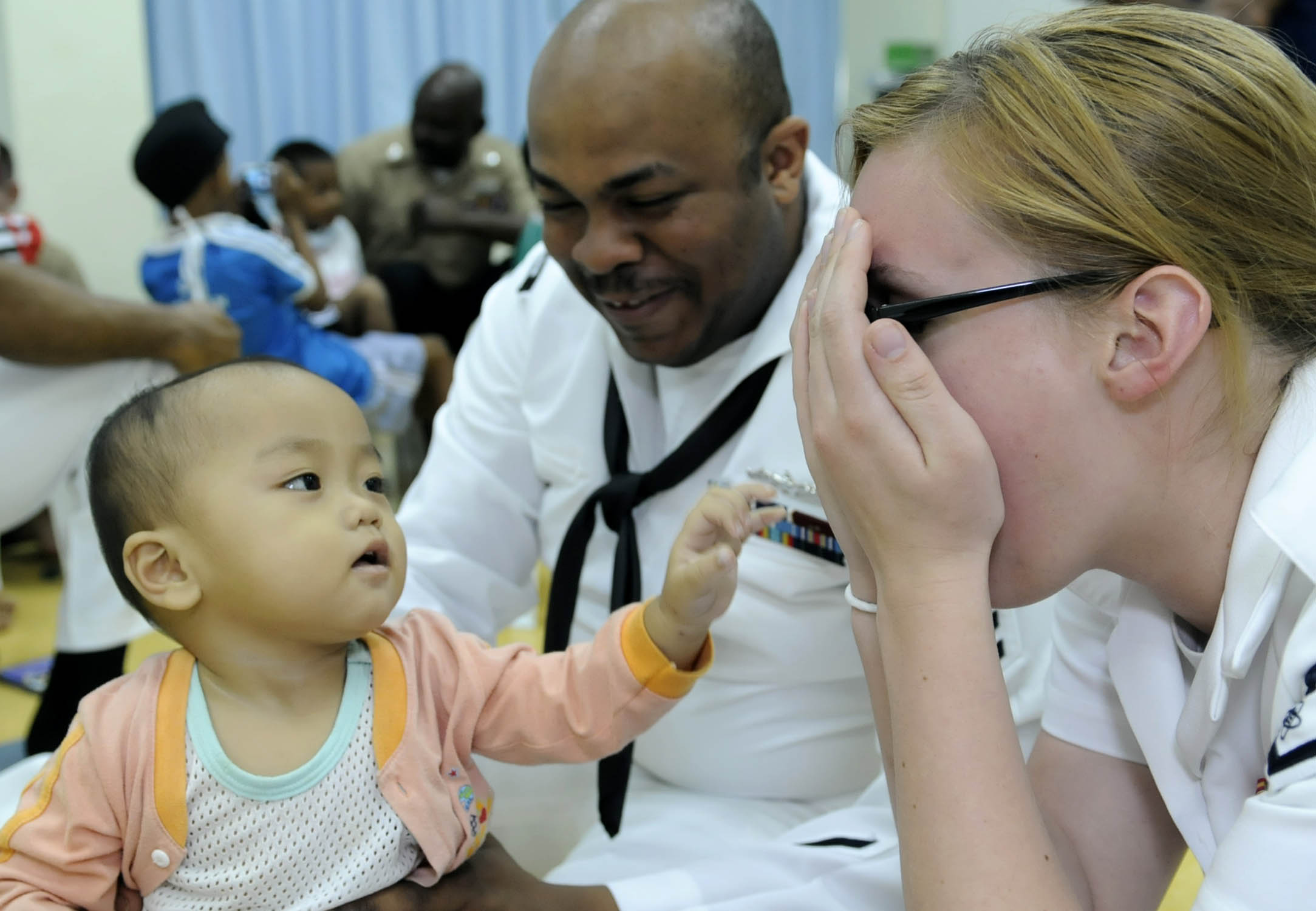
US Navy sailors play peek-a-boo with a child in the Children's Ward at Hospital Likas.

The first of these, the sensorimotor stage "extends from birth to the acquisition of language". In this stage, infants progressively construct knowledge and understanding of the world by coordinating experiences (such as vision and hearing) from physical interactions with objects (such as grasping, sucking, and stepping). Infants gain knowledge of the world from the physical actions they perform within it. They progress from reflexive, instinctual action at birth to the beginning of symbolic thought toward the end of the stage.

Children learn that they are separate from the environment. They can think about aspects of the environment, even though these may be outside the reach of the child's senses. In this stage, according to Piaget, the development of object permanence is one of the most important accomplishments. Object permanence is a child's understanding that an object continues to exist even though they cannot see or hear it. Peek-a-boo is a game in which children who have yet to fully develop object permanence respond to sudden hiding and revealing of a face. By the end of the sensorimotor period, children develop a permanent sense of self and object and will quickly lose interest in Peek-a-boo.

Piaget divided the sensorimotor stage into six sub-stages.

#	Sub-stage	Age	Description
1	Simple reflexes	Birth–6 weeks	"Coordination of sensation and action through reflexive behaviors". Three primary reflexes are described by Piaget: sucking of objects in the mouth, following moving or interesting objects with the eyes, and closing of the hand when an object makes contact with the palm (palmar grasp). Over the first six weeks of life, these reflexes begin to become voluntary actions. For example, the palmar reflex becomes intentional grasping.
2	First habits and primary circular reactions phase	6 weeks–4 months	"Coordination of sensation and two types of schema: habits (reflex) and primary circular reactions (reproduction of an event that initially occurred by chance). The main focus is still on the infant's body". As an example of this type of reaction, an infant might repeat the motion of passing their hand before their face. Also at this phase, passive reactions, caused by classical or operant conditioning, can begin.
3	Secondary circular reactions phase	4–8 months	Development of habits. "Infants become more object-oriented, moving beyond self-preoccupation; repeat actions that bring interesting or pleasurable results". This stage is associated primarily with the development of coordination between vision and prehension. Three new abilities occur at this stage: intentional grasping for a desired object, secondary circular reactions, and differentiations between ends and means. At this stage, infants will intentionally grasp the air in the direction of a desired object, often to the amusement of friends and family. Secondary circular reactions, or the repetition of an action involving an external object begin; for example, moving a switch to turn on a light repeatedly. The differentiation between means and ends also occurs. This is perhaps one of the most important stages of a child's growth as it signifies the dawn of logic.
4	Coordination of secondary circular reactions stages	8–12 months	"Coordination of vision and touch—hand-eye coordination; coordination of schemas and intentionality". This stage is associated primarily with the development of logic and the coordination between means and ends. This is an extremely important stage of development, holding what Piaget calls the "first proper intelligence". Also, this stage marks the beginning of goal orientation, the deliberate planning of steps to meet an objective.
5	Tertiary circular reactions, novelty, and curiosity	12–18 months	"Infants become intrigued by the many properties of objects and by the many things they can make happen to objects; they experiment with new behavior". This stage is associated primarily with the discovery of new means to meet goals. Piaget describes the child at this juncture as the "young scientist," conducting pseudo-experiments to discover new methods of meeting challenges.
6	Internalization of schemas	18–24 months	"Infants develop the ability to use primitive symbols and form enduring mental representations". This stage is associated primarily with the beginnings of insight, or true creativity. This marks the passage into the preoperational stage.

=== Preoperational stage ===
By observing sequences of play, Piaget was able to demonstrate the second stage of his theory, the pre-operational stage. He said that this stage starts towards the end of the second year. It starts when the child begins to learn to speak and lasts up until the age of seven. During the pre-operational stage of cognitive development, Piaget noted that children do not yet understand concrete logic and cannot mentally manipulate information. Children's increase in playing and pretending takes place in this stage. However, the child still has trouble seeing things from different points of view. The children's play is mainly categorized by symbolic play and manipulating symbols. Such play is demonstrated by the idea of checkers being snacks, pieces of paper being plates, and a box being a table. Their observations of symbols exemplifies the idea of play with the absence of the actual objects involved.

The pre-operational stage is sparse and logically inadequate in regard to mental operations. The child is able to form stable concepts as well as magical beliefs (magical thinking). The child, however, is still not able to perform operations, which are tasks that the child can do mentally, rather than physically. Thinking in this stage is still egocentric, meaning the child has difficulty seeing the viewpoint of others. The Pre-operational Stage is split into two substages: the symbolic function substage, and the intuitive thought substage. The symbolic function substage is when children are able to understand, represent, remember, and picture objects in their mind without having the object in front of them. The intuitive thought substage is when children tend to propose the questions of "why?" and "how come?" This stage is when children want to understand everything.

==== Symbolic function substage ====
At about two to four years of age, children cannot yet manipulate and transform information in a logical way. However, they now can think in images and symbols. Other examples of mental abilities are language and pretend play. Symbolic play is when children develop imaginary friends or role-play with friends. Children's play becomes more social and they assign roles to each other. Some examples of symbolic play include playing house, or having a tea party. The type of symbolic play in which children engage is connected with their level of creativity and ability to connect with others. Additionally, the quality of their symbolic play can have consequences on their later development. For example, young children whose symbolic play is of a violent nature tend to exhibit less prosocial behavior and are more likely to display antisocial tendencies in later years.

In this stage, there are still limitations, such as egocentrism and precausal thinking.

Egocentrism occurs when a child is unable to distinguish between their own perspective and that of another person. Children tend to stick to their own viewpoint, rather than consider the view of others. Indeed, they are not even aware that such a concept as "different viewpoints" exists. Egocentrism can be seen in an experiment performed by Piaget and Swiss developmental psychologist Bärbel Inhelder, known as the three mountain problem. In this experiment, three views of a mountain are shown to the child, who is asked what a traveling doll would see at the various angles. The child will consistently describe what they can see from the position from which they are seated, regardless of the angle from which they are asked to take the doll's perspective. Egocentrism would also cause a child to believe, "I like The Lion Guard, so the high school student next door must like The Lion Guard, too."

Similar to preoperational children's egocentric thinking is their structuring of a cause and effect relationships. Piaget coined the term "precausal thinking" to describe the way in which preoperational children use their own existing ideas or views, like in egocentrism, to explain cause-and-effect relationships. Three main concepts of causality as displayed by children in the preoperational stage include: animism, artificialism and transductive reasoning.

Animism is the belief that inanimate objects are capable of actions and have lifelike qualities. An example could be a child believing that the sidewalk was mad and made them fall down, or that the stars twinkle in the sky because they are happy. Artificialism refers to the belief that environmental characteristics can be attributed to human actions or interventions. For example, a child might say that it is windy outside because someone is blowing very hard, or the clouds are white because someone painted them that color. Finally, precausal thinking is categorized by transductive reasoning. Transductive reasoning is when a child fails to understand the true relationships between cause and effect. Unlike deductive or inductive reasoning (general to specific, or specific to general), transductive reasoning refers to when a child reasons from specific to specific, drawing a relationship between two separate events that are otherwise unrelated. For example, if a child hears the dog bark and then a balloon popped, the child would conclude that because the dog barked, the balloon popped.

==== Intuitive thought substage ====
A main feature of the pre-operational stage of development is primitive reasoning. Between the ages of four and seven, reasoning changes from symbolic thought to intuitive thought. This stage is "marked by greater dependence on intuitive thinking rather than just perception." Children begin to have more automatic thoughts that don't require evidence. During this stage there is a heightened sense of curiosity and need to understand how and why things work. Piaget named this substage "intuitive thought" because they are starting to develop more logical thought but cannot explain their reasoning. Thought during this stage is still immature and cognitive errors occur. Children in this stage depend on their own subjective perception of the object or event. This stage is characterized by centration, conservation, irreversibility, class inclusion, and transitive inference.

Centration is the act of focusing all attention on one characteristic or dimension of a situation, whilst disregarding all others. Conservation is the awareness that altering a substance's appearance does not change its basic properties. Children at this stage are unaware of conservation and exhibit centration. Both centration and conservation can be more easily understood once familiarized with Piaget's most famous experimental task.

In this task, a child is presented with two identical beakers containing the same amount of liquid. The child usually notes that the beakers do contain the same amount of liquid. When one of the beakers is poured into a taller and thinner container, children who are younger than seven or eight years old typically say that the two beakers no longer contain the same amount of liquid, and that the taller container holds the larger quantity (centration), without taking into consideration the fact that both beakers were previously noted to contain the same amount of liquid. Due to superficial changes, the child was unable to comprehend that the properties of the substances continued to remain the same (conservation).

Irreversibility is a concept developed in this stage which is closely related to the ideas of centration and conservation. Irreversibility refers to when children are unable to mentally reverse a sequence of events. In the same beaker situation, the child does not realize that, if the sequence of events was reversed and the water from the tall beaker was poured back into its original beaker, then the same amount of water would exist. Another example of children's reliance on visual representations is their misunderstanding of "less than" or "more than". When two rows containing equal numbers of blocks are placed in front of a child, one row spread farther apart than the other, the child will think that the row spread farther contains more blocks.

Class inclusion refers to a kind of conceptual thinking that children in the preoperational stage cannot yet grasp. Children's inability to focus on two aspects of a situation at once inhibits them from understanding the principle that one category or class can contain several different subcategories or classes. For example, a four-year-old girl may be shown a picture of eight dogs and three cats. The girl knows what cats and dogs are, and she is aware that they are both animals. However, when asked, "Are there more dogs or animals?" she is likely to answer "more dogs". This is due to her difficulty focusing on the two subclasses and the larger class all at the same time. She may have been able to view the dogs as dogs or animals, but struggled when trying to classify them as both, simultaneously. Similar to this is concept relating to intuitive thought, known as "transitive inference".

Transitive inference is using previous knowledge to determine the missing piece, using basic logic. Children in the preoperational stage lack this logic. An example of transitive inference would be when a child is presented with the information "A" is greater than "B" and "B" is greater than "C". This child may have difficulty here understanding that "A" is also greater than "C".

=== Concrete operational stage ===
The concrete operational stage is the third stage of Piaget's theory of cognitive development. This stage, which follows the preoperational stage, occurs between the ages of 7 and 11 (middle childhood and preadolescence) years, and is characterized by the appropriate use of logic. During this stage, a child's thought processes become more mature and "adult like". They start solving problems in a more logical fashion. Abstract, hypothetical thinking is not yet developed in the child, and children can only solve problems that apply to concrete events or objects. At this stage, the children undergo a transition where the child learns rules such as conservation. Piaget determined that children are able to incorporate inductive reasoning. Inductive reasoning involves drawing inferences from observations in order to make a generalization. In contrast, children struggle with deductive reasoning, which involves using a generalized principle in order to try to predict the outcome of an event. Children in this stage commonly experience difficulties with figuring out logic in their heads. For example, a child will understand that "A is more than B" and "B is more than C". However, when asked "is A more than C?", the child might not be able to logically figure the question out mentally.

Two other important processes in the concrete operational stage are logic and the elimination of egocentrism.

Egocentrism is the inability to consider or understand a perspective other than one's own. It is the phase where the thought and morality of the child is completely self focused. During this stage, the child acquires the ability to view things from another individual's perspective, even if they think that perspective is incorrect. For instance, show a child a comic in which Jane puts a doll under a box, leaves the room, and then Melissa moves the doll to a drawer, and Jane comes back. A child in the concrete operations stage will say that Jane will still think it's under the box even though the child knows it is in the drawer. (See also False-belief task.)

Children in this stage can, however, only solve problems that apply to actual (concrete) objects or events, and not abstract concepts or hypothetical tasks. Understanding and knowing how to use full common sense has not yet been completely adapted.

Piaget determined that children in the concrete operational stage were able to incorporate inductive logic. On the other hand, children at this age have difficulty using deductive logic, which involves using a general principle to predict the outcome of a specific event. This includes mental reversibility. An example of this is being able to reverse the order of relationships between mental categories. For example, a child might be able to recognize that his or her dog is a Labrador, that a Labrador is a dog, and that a dog is an animal, and draw conclusions from the information available, as well as apply all these processes to hypothetical situations.

==== Testing for concrete operations ====
Piagetian tests are well known and practiced to test for concrete operations. The most prevalent tests are those for conservation. There are some important aspects that the experimenter must take into account when performing experiments with these children.

One example of an experiment for testing conservation is the water level task. An experimenter will have two glasses that are the same size, fill them to the same level with liquid, and make sure the child understands that both of the glasses have the same amount of water in them. Then, the experimenter will pour the liquid from one of the small glasses into a tall, thin glass. The experimenter will then ask the child if the taller glass has more liquid, less liquid, or the same amount of liquid. The child will then give his answer. There are three keys for the experimenter to keep in mind with this experiment. These are justification, number of times asking, and word choice.

- Justification: After the child has answered the question being posed, the experimenter must ask why the child gave that answer. This is important because the answers they give can help the experimenter to assess the child's developmental age.
- Number of times asking: Some argue that a child's answers can be influenced by the number of times an experimenter asks them about the amount of water in the glasses. For example, a child is asked about the amount of liquid in the first set of glasses and then asked once again after the water is moved into a different sized glass. Some children will doubt their original answer and say something they would not have said if they did not doubt their first answer.
- Word choice: The phrasing that the experimenter uses may affect how the child answers. If, in the liquid and glass example, the experimenter asks, "Which of these glasses has more liquid?", the child may think that his thoughts of them being the same is wrong because the adult is saying that one must have more. Alternatively, if the experimenter asks, "Are these equal?", then the child is more likely to say that they are, because the experimenter is implying that they are.
- Classification: As children's experiences and vocabularies grow, they build schemata and are able to organize objects in many different ways. They also understand classification hierarchies and can arrange objects into a variety of classes and subclasses.
- Identity: One feature of concrete operational thought is the understanding that objects have qualities that do not change even if the object is altered in some way. For instance, mass of an object does not change by rearranging it. A piece of chalk is still chalk even when the piece is broken in two.
- Reversibility: The child learns that some things that have been changed can be returned to their original state. Water can be frozen and then thawed to become liquid again; however, eggs cannot be unscrambled. Children use reversibility a lot in mathematical problems such as: 2 + 3 = 5 and 5 – 3 = 2.
- Conservation: The ability to understand that the quantity (mass, weight volume) of something doesn't change due to the change of appearance.
- Decentration: The ability to focus on more than one feature of scenario or problem at a time. This also describes the ability to attend to more than one task at a time. Decentration is what allows for conservation to occur.
- Seriation: Arranging items along a quantitative dimension, such as length or weight, in a methodical way is now demonstrated by the concrete operational child. For example, they can logically arrange a series of different-sized sticks in order by length. Younger children not yet in the concrete stage approach a similar task in a haphazard way.

These new cognitive skills increase the child's understanding of the physical world. However, according to Piaget, they still cannot think in abstract ways. Additionally, they do not think in systematic scientific ways. For example, most children under age twelve would not be able to come up with the variables that influence the period that a pendulum takes to complete its arc. Even if they were given weights they could attach to strings in order to do this experiment, they would not be able to draw a clear conclusion.

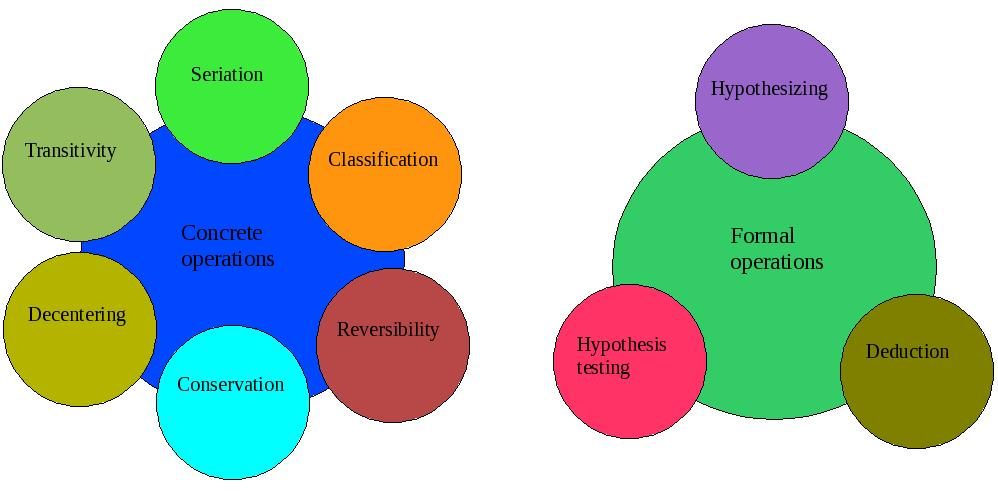
Piagetian operations

=== Formal operational stage ===
The final stage is known as the formal operational stage (early to middle adolescence, beginning at age 11 and finalizing around 14–15): Intelligence is demonstrated through the logical use of symbols related to abstract concepts. This form of thought includes "assumptions that have no necessary relation to reality." At this point, the person is capable of hypothetical and deductive reasoning. During this time, people develop the ability to think about abstract concepts and to reason about hypothetical situations.

Piaget stated that "hypothetico-deductive reasoning" becomes important during the formal operational stage. This type of thinking involves hypothetical "what-if" situations that are not always rooted in reality, i.e. counterfactual thinking. It is often required in science and mathematics.

- Abstract thought emerges during the formal operational stage. Children tend to think very concretely and specifically in earlier stages, and begin to consider possible outcomes and consequences of actions.
- Metacognition, the capacity for "thinking about thinking" that allows adolescents and adults to reason about their thought processes and monitor them.
- Problem-solving is demonstrated when children use trial-and-error to solve problems. The ability to systematically solve a problem in a logical and methodical way emerges.

Children in primary school years mostly use inductive reasoning, but adolescents start to use deductive reasoning. Inductive reasoning is when children draw general conclusions from personal experiences and specific facts. Adolescents learn how to use deductive reasoning by applying logic to create specific conclusions from abstract concepts. This capability results from their capacity to think hypothetically.

The abstract quality of the adolescent's thought at the formal operational level is evident in the adolescent's verbal problem solving ability. The logical quality of the adolescent's thought is when children are more likely to solve problems in a trial-and-error fashion. Adolescents begin to think more as a scientist thinks, devising plans to solve problems and systematically test opinions. They use hypothetical-deductive reasoning, which means that they develop hypotheses or best guesses, and systematically deduce, or conclude, which is the best path to follow in solving the problem. During this stage the adolescent is able to understand love, logical proofs and values. During this stage the young person begins to entertain possibilities for the future and is fascinated with what they can be.

Adolescents also are changing cognitively by the way that they think about social matters. One thing that brings about a change is egocentrism. This happens by heightening self-consciousness and giving adolescents an idea of who they are through their personal uniqueness and invincibility. Adolescent egocentrism can be dissected into two types of social thinking: imaginary audience and personal fable. Imaginary audience consists of an adolescent believing that others are watching them and the things they do. Personal fable is not the same thing as imaginary audience but is often confused with imaginary audience. Personal fable consists of believing that you are exceptional in some way. These types of social thinking begin in the concrete stage but carry on to the formal operational stage of development.

==== Experiments ====
Piaget and his colleagues conducted several experiments to assess formal operational thought.

In one of the experiments, Piaget evaluated the cognitive capabilities of children of different ages through the use of a scale and varying weights. The task was to balance the scale by hooking weights on the ends of the scale. To successfully complete the task, the children must use formal operational thought to realize that the distance of the weights from the center and the heaviness of the weights both affected the balance. A heavier weight has to be placed closer to the center of the scale, and a lighter weight has to be placed farther from the center, so that the two weights balance each other. While 3- to 5- year olds could not at all comprehend the concept of balancing, children by the age of 7 could balance the scale by placing the same weights on both ends, but they failed to realize the importance of the location. By age 10, children could think about location but failed to use logic and instead used trial-and-error. Finally, by age 13 and 14, in early to middle adolescence, some children more clearly understood the relationship between weight and distance and could successfully implement their hypothesis.

=== The stages and causation ===
Piaget sees children's conception of causation as a march from "primitive" conceptions of cause to those of a more scientific, rigorous, and mechanical nature. These primitive concepts are characterized as supernatural, with a decidedly non-natural or non-mechanical tone. Piaget has as his most basic assumption that babies are phenomenists. That is, their knowledge "consists of assimilating things to schemas" from their own action such that they appear, from the child's point of view, "to have qualities which, in fact, stem from the organism". Consequently, these "subjective conceptions," so prevalent during Piaget's first stage of development, are dashed upon discovering deeper empirical truths.

Piaget gives the example of a child believing that the moon and stars follow him on a night walk. Upon learning that such is the case for his friends, he must separate his self from the object, resulting in a theory that the moon is immobile, or moves independently of other agents.

The second stage, from around three to eight years of age, is characterized by a mix of this type of magical, animistic, or "non-natural" conceptions of causation and mechanical or "naturalistic" causation. This conjunction of natural and non-natural causal explanations supposedly stems from experience itself, though Piaget does not make much of an attempt to describe the nature of the differences in conception. In his interviews with children, he asked questions specifically about natural phenomena, such as: "What makes clouds move?", "What makes the stars move?", "Why do rivers flow?" The nature of all the answers given, Piaget says, are such that these objects must perform their actions to "fulfill their obligations towards men". He calls this "moral explanation".

== Postulated physical mechanisms underlying schemes, schemas, and stages ==
First note the distinction between 'schemes' (analogous to 1D lists of action-instructions, e.g. leading to separate pen-strokes), and figurative 'schemas' (aka 'schemata', akin to 2D drawings/sketches or virtual 3D models); see schema. This distinction (often overlooked by translators) is emphasized by Piaget & Inhelder, and others; also in an earlier (1958) psychology dictionary.

In 1967, Piaget considered the possibility of RNA molecules as likely embodiments of his still-abstract schemes (which he promoted as units of action) — though he did not come to any firm conclusion. At that time, due to work such as that of Swedish biochemist Holger Hydén, RNA concentrations had, indeed, been shown to correlate with learning.

To date, with one exception, it has been impossible to investigate such RNA hypotheses by traditional direct observation and logical deduction. The one exception is that such ultra-micro sites would almost certainly have to use optical communication, and recently studies have demonstrated that nerve-fibres can indeed transmit light/infra-red (in addition to their acknowledged role). However it accords with the philosophy of science, especially scientific realism, to do indirect investigations of such phenomena which are intrinsically unobservable for practical reasons. The art then is to build up a plausible interdisciplinary case from the indirect evidence (as indeed the child does during concept development) — and then retain that model until it is disproved by observable-or-other new evidence which then calls for new accommodation.

In that spirit, it now might be said that the RNA/infra-red model is valid (for explaining Piagetian higher intelligence). Anyhow the current situation opens the way for more testing, and further development in several directions, including the finer points of Piaget's agenda.

== Practical applications ==
Parents can use Piaget's theory in many ways to support their child's growth. Teachers can also use Piaget's theory to help their students. For example, recent studies have shown that children in the same grade and of the same age perform differently on tasks measuring basic addition and subtraction accuracy. Children in the preoperational and concrete operational levels of cognitive development perform arithmetic operations (such as addition and subtraction) with similar accuracy; however, children in the concrete operational level have been able to perform both addition problems and subtraction problems with overall greater precision. Teachers can use Piaget's theory to see where each child in their class stands with each subject by discussing the syllabus with their students and the students' parents.

The stage of cognitive growth differs from one person to another. Cognitive development or thinking is an active process from the beginning to the end of life. Intellectual advancement happens because people at every age and developmental period look for cognitive equilibrium. To achieve this balance, the easiest way is to understand the new experiences through the lens of the preexisting ideas. Infants learn that new objects can be grabbed in the same way of familiar objects, and adults explain the day's headlines as evidence for their existing worldview.

However, the application of standardized Piagetian theory and procedures in different societies established widely varying results that led some to speculate that without specific kinds of cultural experience, including formal schooling, development might cease at a certain level, such as the concrete operational level. A procedure was done following methods developed in Geneva (i.e. water level task). Participants were presented with two beakers of equal circumference and height, filled with equal amounts of water. The water from one beaker was transferred into another with taller and smaller circumference. The children and young adults from non-literate societies of a given age were more likely to think that the taller, thinner beaker had more water in it. On the other hand, an experiment on the effects of modifying testing procedures to match local culture produced a different pattern of results. In the revised procedures, the participants explained in their own language and indicated that while the water was now "more", the quantity was the same. Piaget's water level task has also been applied to the elderly by Formann and results showed an age-associated non-linear decline of performance.

== Relation to psychometric theories of intelligence ==
Researchers have linked Piaget's theory to Cattell and Horn's theory of fluid and crystallized abilities. Piaget's operative intelligence corresponds to the Cattell-Horn formulation of fluid ability in that both concern logical thinking and the "eduction of relations" (an expression Cattell used to refer to the inferring of relationships). Piaget's treatment of everyday learning corresponds to the Cattell-Horn formulation of crystallized ability in that both reflect the impress of experience. Piaget's operativity is considered to be prior to, and ultimately provides the foundation for, everyday learning, much like fluid ability's relation to crystallized intelligence.

Piaget's theory also aligns with another psychometric theory, namely the psychometric theory of g, general intelligence. Piaget designed a number of tasks to assess hypotheses arising from his theory. The tasks were not intended to measure individual differences and they have no equivalent in psychometric intelligence tests. Notwithstanding the different research traditions in which psychometric tests and Piagetian tasks were developed, the correlations between the two types of measures have been found to be consistently positive and generally moderate in magnitude. g is thought to underlie performance on the two types of tasks. It has been shown that it is possible to construct a battery consisting of Piagetian tasks that is as good a measure of g as standard IQ tests.

== Challenges to Piagetian stage theory ==
Piagetian accounts of development have been challenged on several grounds. First, as Piaget himself noted, development does not always progress in the smooth manner his theory seems to predict. Décalage, or progressive forms of cognitive developmental progression in a specific domain, suggest that the stage model is, at best, a useful approximation. Furthermore, studies have found that children may be able to learn concepts and capability of complex reasoning that supposedly represented in more advanced stages with relative ease (Lourenço & Machado, 1996, p. 145). More broadly, Piaget's theory is "domain general," predicting that cognitive maturation occurs concurrently across different domains of knowledge (such as mathematics, logic, and understanding of physics or language). Piaget did not take into account variability in a child's performance notably how a child can differ in sophistication across several domains.

Piaget’s theory has been challenged through research studies on a child’s cognitive development such as the habituation paradigm. Many infants possess “core knowledge” which allow them to have an innate understanding for how things around them work. Infants were found to have coherence (objects move in one piece), continuity (objects follow continuous paths), and contact (objects do not move without being touched). In an experiment conducted by Renée Baillargeon, three month old infants were tested to see if they were surprised when a board fell downward and appeared to pass through a ball hidden behind it. These infants were shocked and confused, despite their ages not aligning with the eight months proposed by Piaget. Thus, it was found that the way in which children learn about the world is not strictly confined through different age groups.

During the 1980s and 1990s, cognitive developmentalists were influenced by "neo-nativist" and evolutionary psychology ideas. These ideas de-emphasized domain general theories and emphasized domain specificity or modularity of mind. Modularity implies that different cognitive faculties may be largely independent of one another, and thus develop according to quite different timetables, which are "influenced by real world experiences". In this vein, some cognitive developmentalists argued that, rather than being domain general learners, children come equipped with domain specific theories, sometimes referred to as "core knowledge," which allows them to break into learning within that domain. For example, even young infants appear to be sensitive to some predictable regularities in the movement and interactions of objects (for example, an object cannot pass through another object), or in human behavior (for example, a hand repeatedly reaching for an object has that object, not just a particular path of motion), as it becomes the building block of which more elaborate knowledge is constructed.

Piaget's theory has been said to undervalue the influence that culture has on cognitive development. Piaget demonstrates that a child goes through several stages of cognitive development and comes to conclusions on their own, however, a child's sociocultural environment plays an important part in their cognitive development. Social interaction teaches the child about the world and helps them develop through the cognitive stages, which Piaget neglected to consider.

More recent work from a newer dynamic systems approach has strongly challenged some of the basic presumptions of the "core knowledge" school that Piaget suggested. Dynamic systems approaches harken to modern neuroscientific research that was not available to Piaget when he was constructing his theory. This brought new light into research in psychology in which new techniques such as brain imaging provided new understanding to cognitive development. One important finding is that domain-specific knowledge is constructed as children develop and integrate knowledge. This enables the domain to improve the accuracy of the knowledge as well as organization of memories. However, this suggests more of a "smooth integration" of learning and development than either Piaget, or his neo-nativist critics, had envisioned. Additionally, some psychologists, such as Lev Vygotsky and Jerome Bruner, thought differently from Piaget, suggesting that language was more important for cognition development than Piaget implied.

== Post-Piagetian and neo-Piagetian stages ==
In recent years, several theorists attempted to address concerns with Piaget's theory by developing new theories and models that can accommodate evidence which violates Piagetian predictions and postulates.

- The neo-Piagetian theories of cognitive development, advanced by Robbie Case, Andreas Demetriou, Graeme S. Halford, Kurt W. Fischer, Michael Lamport Commons, and Juan Pascual-Leone, attempted to integrate Piaget's theory with cognitive and differential theories of cognitive organization and development. Their aim was to better account for the cognitive factors of development and for intra-individual and inter-individual differences in cognitive development. They suggested that development along Piaget's stages is due to increasing working memory capacity and processing efficiency by "biological maturation". Moreover, Demetriou's theory ascribes an important role to hypercognitive processes of "self-monitoring, self-recording, self-evaluation, and self-regulation", and it recognizes the operation of several relatively autonomous domains of thought (Demetriou, 1998; Demetriou, Mouyi, Spanoudis, 2010; Demetriou, 2003, p. 153).
- Piaget's theory stops at the formal operational stage, but other researchers have observed the thinking of adults is more nuanced than formal operational thought. This fifth stage has been named post formal thought or operation. Post formal stages have been proposed. Michael Commons presented evidence for four post formal stages in the model of hierarchical complexity: systematic, meta-systematic, paradigmatic, and cross-paradigmatic (Commons & Richards, 2003, p. 206–208; Oliver, 2004, p. 31). There are many theorists, however, who have criticized "post formal thinking," because the concept lacks both theoretical and empirical verification. The term "integrative thinking" has been suggested for use instead.

Kohlberg's Model of Moral Development

- A "sentential" stage, said to occur before the early preoperational stage, has been proposed by Fischer, Biggs and Biggs, Commons, and Richards.
- Jerome Bruner has expressed views on cognitive development in a "pragmatic orientation" in which humans actively use knowledge for practical applications, such as problem solving and understanding reality.
- Michael Lamport Commons proposed the model of hierarchical complexity (MHC) in two dimensions: horizontal complexity and vertical complexity (Commons & Richards, 2003, p. 205).
- Kieran Egan has proposed five stages of understanding. These are "somatic", "mythic", "romantic", "philosophic", and "ironic". These stages are developed through cognitive tools such as "stories", "binary oppositions", "fantasy" and "rhyme, rhythm, and meter" to enhance memorization to develop a long-lasting learning capacity.
- Lawrence Kohlberg developed three stages of moral development: "Preconventional", "Conventional" and "Postconventional". Each level is composed of two orientation stages, with a total of six orientation stages: (1) "Punishment-Obedience", (2) "Instrumental Relativist", (3) "Good Boy-Nice Girl", (4) "Law and Order", (5) "Social Contract", and (6) "Universal Ethical Principle".
- Andreas Demetriou has expressed neo-Piagetian theories of cognitive development.
- Jane Loevinger's stages of ego development occur through "an evolution of stages". "First is the Presocial Stage followed by the Symbiotic Stage, Impulsive Stage, Self-Protective Stage, Conformist Stage, Self-Aware Level: Transition from Conformist to Conscientious Stage, Individualistic Level: Transition from Conscientious to the Autonomous Stage, Conformist Stage, and Integrated Stage".
- Ken Wilber has incorporated Piaget's theory in his multidisciplinary field of integral theory. The human consciousness is structured in hierarchical order and organized in "holon" chains or "great chain of being", which are based on the level of spiritual and psychological development.
- Oliver Kress published a model that connected Piaget's theory of development and Abraham Maslow's concept of self-actualization.
  Maslow's Hierarchy Of Needs
- Cheryl Armon has proposed five stages of " the Good Life". These are "Egoistic Hedonism", "Instrumental Hedonism", "Affective/Altruistic Mutuality", "Individuality", and "Autonomy/Community" (Andreoletti & Demick, 2003, p. 284) (Armon, 1984, p. 40–43).
- Christopher R. Hallpike proposed that human evolution of cognitive moral understanding had evolved from the beginning of time from its primitive state to the present time.
- Robert Kegan extended Piaget's developmental model to adults in describing what he called constructive-developmental psychology.
