= Horizontal and vertical décalage =

Horizontal and vertical décalage are terms coined by developmental psychologist Jean Piaget, which he used to describe the four stages in Piaget's theory of cognitive development: sensorimotor, preoperational, concrete operations, and formal operations. According to Piaget, horizontal and vertical décalage generally occur during the concrete operations stage of development.

Horizontal décalage refers to fact that once a child learns a certain function, he or she does not have the capability to immediately apply the learned function to all problems. In other words, "a horizontal décalage arises when a cognitive structure that can be successfully applied to task X cannot, though it is composed of the same organization of logical operations, be extended to task Y." Horizontal décalage is frequently used in reference to a child's ability to solve different conservation tasks. This concept recognizes that an individual child will not necessarily be on the same level of functioning in all possible areas of performance. Rather, "concepts and schemas develop through operation on and manipulation of objects in a specific manner." Vertical décalage refers to a child using the same cognitive function in different stages across development. In this sense, a child is improving upon a certain cognitive function, such as seriation tasks, as he or she ages.

== History ==
The term 'décalage' was first used in psychology by Édouard Claparède, a Swiss neurologist and child psychologist, in 1917 in reference to consciousness. Long before Piaget coined the term, his studies in 1921 brought to light the idea that some tasks are more demanding for children than others based on their complexity. This information supports the information processing theory, an opposing theory of cognitive development. Piaget then used the term himself in 1941, as he was developing his theory of the cognitive development. In his research, Piaget discovered that while physical qualities (once developed) were invariant, children's problem solving abilities are not. His studies revealed certain "décalages," or shifts and inconsistencies, in a child's cognitive development.

== Common examples ==
An example of horizontal décalage is the invariance of quantity, which is typically mastered around the age of 6 or 7 when matter is concerned, at the age of 9 or 10 when weight is concerned, and around 11 or 12 years old when the invariant is volume. A 7-year-old child understands that when one of two equivalent balls of clay is transformed into a sausage-shape, the two lumps still consist of equal amounts of clay. The child, however, fails to correctly comprehend that the differently shaped clumps of clay weigh the same. Both tasks are similar, but the child is clearly unable to apply his understanding about the first situation to the second situation. A comparable phenomenon can be seen in a child's increasing ability to perform seriation tasks, which consists of ordering objects according to increasing or decreasing size. The ability to arrange rods in order of decreasing/increasing size is always acquired prior to the capacity to seriate according to weight. A commonly cited example of vertical décalage "can be observed between the constitution of practical or sensorimotor space and that of representative space " For example, at the age of 2, a child can navigate around a familiar environment, such as their home. It is not until years later that they can represent this knowledge symbolically by drawing a map. There is vertical décalage between a problem that a child can physically master and their ability to solve it in an abstract manner.

== Neurobiological perspective ==
Some psychologists take a neural network model approach to the idea of horizontal and vertical décalage. According to these psychologists, horizontal and vertical décalage are the product of the development of the prefrontal cortex in children, which "contributes to age-related advances in flexible behavior". Certain tests and studies have been conducted to show how horizontal and vertical décalage are related to neural functioning. For example, scientists presented children with two identical balls of clay and then rolled one into a cylinder, changing its shape. When scientists then asked children which clump of clay contained more clay (conservation of mass), children were able to answer correctly that both clumps had equal amounts of clay. Children of the same age, however, were unable to answer which clump of clay weighed more (conservation of weight). This is an example of horizontal décalage because children were able to solve certain conservation tasks but not others despite their similarities. According to the neural network approach, as a child's prefrontal cortex develops, he or she is better able to maintain their knowledge "rules" and apply problem solving techniques across different situations. The development of the prefrontal cortex comes from the strengthening of neural synapses, a process which is remarkably heightened in childhood.

== Studies ==
A series of studies by Piaget and Szeminska in 1941 and Piaget and Inhelder in 1967 revealed a horizontal décalage of approximately three years on tasks of length and weight seriation. The scientists tested 37 five- to ten-year-old boys and girls. In the length seriation task of this experiment, the subjects were made to order seven sticks from shortest to longest. In a variation of this task, called the "hidden length experiment," the children were made to order the sticks, but were only able to look at two sticks at a time, forcing them to employ the transitive property. Finally, the children were forced to place seven identical cubes of different densities in order from lightest to heaviest. The results revealed that the "hidden length" seriation task and the weight seriation task were much more difficult for the children than were the normal seriation tasks, thereby supporting the notion of horizontal décalage. While the children were able to successfully complete certain seriation tasks, they were unable to complete others.

Studies have also been conducted regarding vertical decalage. In a study by Redpath and Rogers, fifteen males and fifteen females from both preschool and second grade were interviewed. From these interviews, it was evident that the children showed a developmental progression in their understanding of different medical concepts, such as "hospitals, doctors, nurses, operations, and illness." The researchers concluded that the children's grasp and understanding of these medical concepts were related to the level of their cognitive development. The second graders demonstrated a heightened ability to understand said concepts as compared to the preschool aged children, thus supporting the notion of vertical decalage. The researchers discovered that if the second graders had been previously hospitalized, the experience improved their grasp of hospital concepts. This was not the case with preschoolers because they were not able to translate their experience into understanding.

== Criticisms ==
There have been many criticisms of Piaget's theories, including his ideas of horizontal and vertical décalage. A further criticism is that restructuring the presentation of a problem has a significant bearing on the child's ability to solve the problem, which demonstrates that problem solving ability might depend on the presentation of the problem more so than on the child's cognitive development. According to Wordsworth and other Piagetian supporters, however, Piaget's main idea that all children have the same general course of development is so significant that it outweighs the criticisms of his methodology in which so many others find fault.
