= Cognitive development =

Field of study in neuroscience and psychology

Cognitive development is a field of study in neuroscience and psychology focusing on a child's development in terms of information processing, conceptual resources, perceptual skill, language learning, and other aspects of the developed adult brain and cognitive psychology. Qualitative differences between how a child processes their waking experience and how an adult processes their waking experience are acknowledged (such as object permanence, the understanding of logical relations, and cause-effect reasoning in school-age children). Cognitive development is defined as the emergence of the ability to consciously cognize, understand, and articulate their understanding in adult terms. Cognitive development is how a person perceives, thinks, and gains understanding of their world through the relations of genetic and learning factors. Cognitive information development is often described in terms of four key components: reasoning, intelligence, language, and memory. These aspects begin to develop in early infancy as infants engage with their environment by playing with toys, listening to their parents, and responding to stimuli that capture their attention, all of which contribute to cognitive growth.

Jean Piaget was a major force establishing this field, forming his "theory of cognitive development". Piaget proposed four stages of cognitive development: the sensorimotor, preoperational, concrete operational, and formal operational period. Many of Piaget's theoretical claims have since fallen out of favor. His description of the most prominent changes in cognition with age is generally still accepted today (e.g., how early perception moves from being dependent on concrete, external actions. Later, abstract understanding of observable aspects of reality can be captured, leading to the discovery of underlying abstract rules and principles, usually starting in adolescence)

In recent years, however, alternative models have been advanced, including information-processing theory, neo-Piagetian theories of cognitive development, which aim to integrate Piaget's ideas with more recent models and concepts in developmental and cognitive science, theoretical cognitive neuroscience, and social-constructivist approaches. Another such model of cognitive development is Bronfenbrenner's Ecological Systems Theory. A major controversy in cognitive development has been "nature versus nurture", i.e., the question if cognitive development is mainly determined by an individual's innate qualities ("nature"), or by their personal experiences ("nurture"). However, it is now recognized by most experts that this is a false dichotomy: there is overwhelming evidence from biological and behavioral sciences that from the earliest points in development, gene activity interacts with events and experiences in the environment. While naturalists are convinced of the power of genetic mechanisms, knowledge from different disciplines, such as Comparative psychology, Molecular biology, and Neuroscience, shows arguments for an ecological component in launching cognition (see the section "The beginning of cognition" below).

== History ==
Jean Piaget is inextricably linked to cognitive development, as he was the first to make a systematic study of developmental processes. Despite being the first to develop a systematic study of cognitive development, Piaget was not the first to theorize about cognitive development.

Jean-Jacques Rousseau wrote Emile, or On Education in 1762. He discusses childhood development as happening in three stages. In the first stage, up to age 12, the child is guided by their emotions and impulses. In the second stage, ages 12–16, the child's reason starts to develop. In the third and final stage, age 16 and up, the child develops into an adult.

James Sully wrote several books on childhood development, including Studies of Childhood in 1895 and Children's Ways in 1897. He used a detailed observational study method with the children. Contemporary research in child development actually repeats observations and observational methods summarized by Sully in Studies of Childhood, such as the mirror technique.

Sigmund Freud developed the theory of psychosexual development, which indicates children must pass through several stages as they develop their cognitive skills.

Maria Montessori began working with children with intellectual disabilities around 1900, as director of the Orthophrenic School in Rome, and from 1907 conducted observational and experimental research with young children at the first Casa dei Bambini. She developed the Montessori method of education from 1907, first publishing it as Il Metodo della Pedagogia Scientifica (The Montessori Method) in 1909; the work's final revised edition appeared in 1950 as The Discovery of the Child. She described four planes of development: birth to 6 years, 6 to 12, 12 to 18, and 18 to 24. Each plane is further divided into two sub-stages; the first plane, for example, comprises the infant/toddler years (birth to 3) and early childhood (3 to 6). She was working on human behavior in older children but only published lecture notes on the subject.

Arnold Gesell was the creator of the maturational theory of development. Gesell said biological and hereditary factors drive development, and that children reach developmental milestones in a predictable sequence when they are ready. Because of his theory of development, he devised a developmental scale that is used today called the Gesell Developmental Schedule (GDS), which provides parents, teachers, doctors, and other pertinent people with an overview of where an infant or child falls on the developmental spectrum.

Erik Erikson was a neo-Freudian who focused on how children develop personality and identity. Although a contemporary of Freud, there is a larger focus on social experiences that occur across the lifespan, as opposed to childhood exclusively, that contribute to how personality and identity emerge. His framework uses eight systematic stages that all children must pass through.

Urie Bronfenbrenner devised the ecological systems theory, which identifies various levels of a child's environment. The primary focus of this theory focuses on the quality and context of a child's environment. Bronfenbrenner suggested that as a child grows older, their interaction between the various levels of their environment grows more complex due to cognitive abilities expanding.

Lawrence Kohlberg wrote the theory of stages of moral development, which extended Piaget's findings of cognitive development and showed that they continue through the lifespan. Kohlberg's six stages follow Piaget's constructivist requirements in that those stages can not be skipped and it is very rare to regress in stages. Notable works: Moral Stages and Moralization: The Cognitive-Development Approach (1976) and Essays on Moral Development (1981)

Lev Vygotsky's theory is based on social learning as the most important aspect of cognitive development. In Vygotsky's theory, adults are very important for young children's development. They help children learn through mediation, which is modeling and explaining concepts. Together, adults and children master concepts of their culture and activities. Vygotsky believed we get our complex mental activities through social learning. A significant part of Vygotsky's theory is based on the zone of proximal development, which he believes is when the most effective learning takes place. The zone of proximal development is what a child cannot accomplish alone but can accomplish with the help of an MKO (more knowledgeable other). Vygotsky also believed culture is a very important part of cognitive development such as the language, writing and counting system used in that culture. Another aspect of Vygotsky's theory is private speech. Private speech is when a person talks to themselves in order to help themselves problem solve. Scaffolding or providing support to a child and then slowly removing support and allowing the child to do more on their own over time is also an aspect of Vygotsky's theory.

== Beginning of cognition ==
In cognitive development, the essential issue in beginning cognition is how the nervous system grasps perception and shapes intentionality in the sensorimotor stage (or before) when organisms only demonstrate simple reflexes (see articles perception, cognition, binding problem, multi sensory integration). The significance of this knowledge is that the mode to cognize at the stage without communication and abstract thinking, being a pre-requisite of social reality formation, determines the development of everything from cooperative interactions and knowledge assimilation to moral identity and cultural evolution that provides building societies (see also Social cognition and Collective behaviour). The contemporary academic discussion on a controversy in cognitive development (whether cognitive development is mainly determined by an individual's innate qualities or personal experiences) is still in progress.

Many influential scientists argue that the genetic code is no more than a rule of causal specificity based on the fact that cells use nucleic acids as templates for the primary structure of proteins. However, it is unacceptable to say that DNA contains the information for phenotypic design. The epigenetic approach to human psychological development – that cascading phenotypic effects are not encoded directly in the genes – contrasts sharply with many so-called nativist approaches. Opponents of innate knowledge discuss four problems in appearance of the perception of objects.

The binding problem – According to cognitive psychologist Anne Treisman, the binding problem can be divided into three separate problems. (1) How are relevant elements that should be related as a whole selected and separated from elements that belong to other objects, ideas, or events? (2) How is the binding encoded so it can be transferred to other brain systems and used? (3) How are the correct relationships between related elements within the same object defined? This problem is also connected to the problem of multisensory integration in perception.

The perception stability problem – Newborns and infants cannot capture the same picture of the environment as adults because of their immature sensory systems. They cannot sense environmental stimuli from social phenomena to the same extent as adults. The outcomes of processing similar sensory stimuli in immature and mature organisms differ. The corresponding holistic representations of objects can hardly occur in these organisms.

The excitatory inputs problem – According to the received view in cognitive sciences, cognition develops due to experience-dependent neuronal plasticity, e.g., Neuronal plasticity refers to the capacity of the nervous system to modify itself, functionally and structurally, in response to experience and injury. However, the structural organization of excitatory inputs supporting spike-timing-dependent plasticity remains unknown. How is the relation between a specific sensory stimulus and the appropriate structural organization of the excitatory inputs in specific neurons formed?

The problem of morphogenesis – Cell actions during an embryo formation, including shape changes, cell contact remodeling, cell migration, cell division, and cell extrusion, need control over cell mechanics. This complex dynamical process is associated with protrusive, contractile, and adhesive forces and hydrostatic pressure, as well as material properties of cells that dictate how cells respond to active stresses. Precise coordination of all cells is a necessary condition. Moreover, such a complex dynamical process likely requires clear parameters of the final biological structure – the complete developmental program with a template for accomplishing it. Collinet and Lecuit (2021) pose a question: what forces or mechanisms at the cellular level manage four very general classes of tissue deformation, namely tissue folding and invagination, tissue flow and extension, tissue hollowing, and, finally, tissue branching? They challenge the nativists' notion that shape is fully encoded and determined by genes: how are cell mechanics and associated cell behaviors robustly organized in space and time during tissue morphogenesis? They argue that not only gene expression and the resulting biochemical cues but also mechanics and geometry act as sources of morphogenetic information to ultimately define the time and length scales of the cell behaviors driving morphogenesis. Thus, it is not only the interaction of gene activity with events and experiences in the environment that contributes to the formation of tissues in morphogenesis. Because the nervous system structures operate over everything that makes us human, the formation of neural tissues in a certain way is essential for shaping cognitive functions. According to research professor Igor Val Danilov, such a complex process of shaping the determined structure of the nervous system requires a complete developmental program with a template for accomplishing the final biological structure of the nervous system. Indeed, because even processes of the cell coupling for shaping a nervous system during embryonal development challenge the naturalistic approach, how the nervous system grasps perception and shapes intentionality (independently, i.e., without any template) seems even more complicated.

So, the fact that gene activity interacts with events and experiences in the environment (as noted above) may not fully explain the integrative complexity of intentionality-perception development for beginning cognitive development. The primary cognitive theories explaining this "bottom-up" generation of beginning cognition include:

Traditional computational models suggest that mental processes are primarily a response to outside stimuli (evoked brain activity). The Enactive brain framework turns this upside down, demonstrating that cognition begins internally. Professor Zhang and colleagues argued that: "the dynamic regulation of brain activity in response to task situations is the core brain mechanism of mental processing." This position stands that the brain maintains continuous, highly intense spontaneous neural oscillations even in the absence of outside stimulation. Under the theory of predictive coding, these spontaneous neural patterns act as proactive internal simulations or expectations. The mind develops as the neural architecture continuously works to minimize the error or statistical distance between these internal spontaneous bursts and incoming sensory signals. Cognition is literally driven forward by the brain's internal requirement to dynamically balance its own electrical fluctuations against reality.

Embodied cognition approach posits that beginning mental processes are not abstract computational codes but are instead fundamentally grounded in the bodily systems that control movement and monitor sensory-motor interactions. "High order cognitive functions are grounded in the sensory-motor system." This framework relies on neural exploitation—the concept that the brain adapts evolutionary older sensorimotor neural circuits to support newly emerging, higher-level cognitive operations like language and conceptual categorization. When an infant or individual observes an object, their brain undergoes an "as-if" neural simulation, firing canonical neurons in the premotor and parietal areas. These neurons simulate the motor mechanics required to grasp or interact with the object, effectively pushing the abstract mental concept of "what the object is" directly out of the motor system.

The mother-fetus neurocognitive model attempts to provide a multi-level theoretical framework capable of bridging neurophysiological mechanisms at the onset of cognitive development across domains ranging from interpersonal dynamics to neuronal synchronization. Professor of psychology Michael Tomasello hypothesised that social bonds between children and caregivers would gradually increase through the essential motive force of shared intentionality beginning from birth. The notion of Shared intentionality, introduced by Michael Tomasello, was developed by the mother-fetus neurocognitive model, expanding it to the intrauterine period. The Shared intentionality approach also points out that "an innate sensitivity to specific patterns of information" mentioned in the section "Speculated core systems of cognition" is also the outcome of Shared intentionality with caregivers, who obviously participated in the experiments.

=== Criticism ===
Traditional Computational Models

A primary limitation of traditional computationalism is its reliance on abstract, algorithmic code for symbol manipulation. From a contemporary cognitive perspective, this framework encounters the symbol grounding problem, as it remains challenging to explain how these internal symbols acquire intrinsic meaning or align effectively with physical reality and biological survival.

Embodied Cognition

While the embodied cognition approach offers valuable insights into sensorimotor grounding, its emphasis on "as-if" neural simulations introduces specific theoretical challenges. If the cognitive architecture must simulate the motor mechanics of every observed stimulus to achieve comprehension, the model faces difficulties accounting for novel stimuli or highly abstract concepts that lack a direct somatic or motor counterpart.

The Mother-Fetus Neurocognitive Model

Although this hypothesis presents an ambitious framework, it presents substantial conceptual and empirical challenges. Furthermore, shared intentionality itself remains a psychological construct largely predicated on speculative theoretical premises rather than concrete biological data. The assertion that such prenatal mechanisms can establish a functional cognitive architecture prior to postnatal exteroceptive, sensorimotor exposure to social reality remains unverified. However, this poses a problem for all theories of cognitive development.

== Jean Piaget ==
Jean Piaget was the first psychologist and philosopher to brand this type of study as "cognitive development". Other researchers, in multiple disciplines, had studied development in children before, but Piaget is often credited as being the first one to make a systematic study of cognitive development and gave it its name. His main contribution is the stage theory of child cognitive development. He also published his observational studies of cognition in children, and created a series of simple tests to reveal different cognitive abilities in children. Piaget believed that people move through stages of development that allow them to think in new, more complex ways.

=== Criticism ===
Many of Piaget's claims have fallen out of favor. For example, he claimed that young children cannot conserve numbers. However, further experiments showed that children did not really understand what was being asked of them. When the experiment is done with candies, and the children are asked which set they want rather than having to tell an adult which is more, they show no confusion about which group has more items. Piaget argues that the child cannot conserve numbers if they do not understand one-to-one correspondence.

Piaget's theory of cognitive development ends at the formal operational stage that is usually developed in early adulthood. It does not take into account later stages of adult cognitive development as described by, for example, Harvard University professor Robert Kegan.

Additionally, Piaget largely ignores the effects of social and cultural upbringing on stages of development because he only examined children from western societies. This matters as certain societies and cultures have different early childhood experiences. For example, individuals in nomadic tribes struggle with number counting and object counting. Certain cultures have specific activities and events that are common at a younger age which can affect aspects such as object permanence. This indicates that children from different societies may achieve a stage like the formal operational stage while in other societies, children at the exact same age remain in the concrete operational stage.

=== Stages ===
==== Sensorimotor stage ====
Piaget believed that infants entered a sensorimotor stage which lasts from birth until age 2. In this stage, individuals use their senses to investigate and interact with their environment. Through this they develop coordination between the sensory input and motor responses. Piaget also theorized that this stage ended with the acquisition of object permanence and the emergence of symbolic thought.

This view collapsed in the 1980s when research was put out showing that infants as young as five months are able to represent out-of-sight objects, as well their properties, such as number and rigidity.

==== Preoperational stage ====
Piaget believed that children entered a preoperational stage from roughly age 2 until age 7. This stage involves the development of symbolic thought (which manifests in children’s increased ability to ‘play pretend’). This stage involves language acquisition, but also the inability to understand complex logic or to mentally manipulate information.

Subsequent work suggesting that preschoolers were indeed capable of taking others' perspectives into account and reasoning about abstract relationships, including causal relationships marked the demise of this aspect of stage theory as well.

==== Concrete operational stage ====
Piaget believed that the concrete operational stage spanned roughly from age 6 through age 12. This stage is marked by the development and achievement of skills such as conservation, classification, serialism, and spatial reasoning.

Work suggesting that much younger children reason about abstract ideas including kinds, logical operators, and causal relationships rendered this aspect of stage theory obsolete.

==== Formal operational stage ====
Piaget believed that the formal operational stage spans roughly from age 12 through adulthood, and is marked by the ability to apply mental operations to abstract ideas.

== Erik Erikson ==
Erikson worked with Freud but unlike Freud, Erikson focused on Biological, Psychological, and social factors in human development. Each stage is rooted in some kind of competence, or perceived ability to do things.

Each stage is defined by 2 conflicting psychological tendencies and by what traits develop in the stage dependent on how much of each tendency was experienced. There are virtues that develop in healthy circumstances and maladaptations that develop in unhealthy circumstances. It consists of 8 stages. While the conflicting tendencies may appear to be good versus bad. They can be considered as a balance where most healthy individuals experience some of each.

=== Stage 1-Infancy- Trust Versus Mistrust ===
A baby has very little ability to do anything for themself. As such infants develop according to whether they learn to trust or distrust the world around them. The virtue that arises during this stage is hope and the maladaptation is withdrawal.

=== Stage 2-Early Childhood- Autonomy Versus Shame ===
As a child starts to explore the world the conflict they experience is autonomy or a feeling of being able to do things themselves, verses shame or doubt, which is a feeling of being unable to do things themselves and fear of making mistakes. The virtue that arises during this period is will, suggesting a control over one's actions. The maladaptation for this stage is compulsion, or lack of control over one's actions.

=== Stage 3-Play Age- Initiative Versus Guilt ===
As a child grows from the stage of autonomy verses shame, they experience the conflict of initiative vs guilt. Initiative or having the ability to act in a situation against guilt or feeling bad about their actions or feeling incapable of acting. The virtue that develops in this stage is purpose and the maladaptation is inhibition.

=== Stage 4-School Age- Industry Versus Inferiority ===
As a child's awareness of their effect on the world around them grows they come to the conflict of industry and inferiority. Industry meaning ability and willingness to proactively interact with the world around them and Inferiority meaning incapability or perceived incapability to interact with the world. The virtue that is learned in this stage is competence and the maladaptation is inertia or passivity.

=== Stage 5-adolescence- Identity Versus Identity Confusion ===
As a child grows into adolescence, their ability to interact with the world starts to interact with their perceptions of who they are, and they find themselves in a conflict between identity and identity confusion. Identity means knowledge of who they are and developing their own sense of right and wrong. Identity confusion meaning confusion over who they are and what right and wrong is to them. The virtue that is developed is fidelity and the maldevelopment is repudiation.

=== Stage 6-Young Adulthood- Intimacy Versus Isolation ===
During young adulthood, people find themselves in a place where they are looking for belonging in a small number of close relationships. Intimacy suggests finding very close relationships with other people and isolation is a lack of such a connection. The virtue that can arise from this is love and the maladaptation is distantiation.

=== Stage 7-Adulthood- Generativity Versus Stagnation ===
In this stage of life people find that along with accomplishing personal goals, they are either giving to the next generation, whether as a mentor or a parent or they turn towards themselves and keep a distance from others. The virtue that arises in this stage is caring and the maladaptation is rejectivity.

=== Stage 8-Old Age- Integrity Versus Despair ===
Those in the twilight of their life look back at their lives and either are satisfied with their life's work or feel great regret. This satisfaction or regret is a large part of their identity at the end of their lives. The virtue that develops is wisdom and the maldevelopment is disdain.

== Current Theories of Cognitive Development ==
=== Core Knowledge Theory ===
Empiricists study how these skills may be learned in such a short time. The debate is over whether these systems are learned by general-purpose learning devices or domain-specific cognition. Moreover, many modern cognitive developmental psychologists, recognizing that the term "innate" does not square with modern knowledge about epigenesis, neurobiological development, or learning, favor a non-nativist framework. Researchers who discuss "core systems" often speculate about differences in thinking and learning between proposed domains.

Research suggests that children have an innate sensitivity to specific patterns of information, referred to as core domains. The discussion of “core knowledge” theory focuses on a few main systems, including agents, objects, numbers, and navigation.

==== Agents ====
It is speculated that a piece of an infants’ core knowledge lies in their ability to abstractly represent actors. Agents are actors, human or otherwise, who process events and situations, and select actions based on goals and beliefs. Children expect the actions of agents to be goal-directed, efficient, and understand that they have costs, such as time, energy, or effort. Children are importantly able to differentiate between actors and inanimate objects, proving a deeper understanding of the concept of an agent.

==== Objects ====
Within the theorized systems, infants’ core knowledge of objects has been one of the most extensively studied. These studies suggest that young infants appear to have an early expectation of object solidity, namely understanding that objects cannot pass through one another. Similarly, they demonstrate an awareness of object continuity, expecting objects to move on continuous paths rather than teleporting or discontinuously changing their locations. They also expect objects to follow the laws of gravity.

==== Numbers ====
Evidence suggests that humans utilize two core systems for number representation: approximate representations and precise representations. The approximate number system helps to capture the relationship between quantities by estimating numerical magnitudes. This system becomes more precise with age. The second system helps to precisely monitor small groups (limited to around 3 for infants) of individual objects and accurately represent those numerical quantities.

==== Place ====
Very young children appear to have some skill in navigation. This basic ability to infer the direction and distance of unseen locations develops in ways that are not entirely clear. However, there is some evidence that it involves the development of complex language skills between 3 and 5 years. Also, there is evidence that this skill depends importantly on visual experience, because congenitally blind individuals have been found to have impaired abilities to infer new paths between familiar locations.

One of the original nativist versus empiricist debates was over depth perception. There is some evidence that children less than 72 hours old can perceive such complex things as biological motion. However, it is unclear how visual experience in the first few days contributes to this perception. There are far more elaborate aspects of visual perception that develop during infancy and beyond.

=== Shared Intentionality ===
This approach integrates Externalism (a group of positions in the philosophy of mind: embodied cognition, embodied embedded cognition, enactivism, extended mind, and situated cognition) with the Empiricist ideas about the beginning of cognition only from learning in the environment. According to the Externalism approach, communicative symbols are encoded into the local topological properties of neuronal maps, which reflect a dynamical action pattern. The sensorimotor neuronal network enables pairing the relevant cue with a particular symbol saved in the sensorimotor structures and processes that reveals embodied meanings. In this sense, the Shared intentionality theory does not contradict the Core Knowledge Theory while complements it.

Based on evidence of child cognitive development, experimental data from research on child behavior in the prenatal period, and advances in inter-brain neuroscience research, research professor at Liepaja University Igor Val Danilov introduced the notion of non-local neuronal coupling of the mother and fetus neuronal networks. The term non-local neuronal coupling refers to the pre-perceptual communication provided by copying adequate ecological dynamics by one biological system from another, both indwelling one environmental context. The naive actor (fetus) replicates information from the experienced agent (mother) due to the synchronization of intrinsic processes of these dynamic systems (embodied information). This non-local neuronal coupling succeeds due to a low-frequency oscillator (mother's heartbeats) that coordinates relevant local neuronal networks in specific subsystems of these two organisms, which already exhibit gamma activity (similar embodied information in both). The registered cooperative neuronal activity in inter-brain research, so-called mirror neurons, is probably the manifestation of this non-local neuronal coupling. In such a manner, the experienced agent ensures one-direction conveying information about an actual cognitive event toward an organism at the simple reflexes stage of cognitive development without interacting through sensory signals. Obviously, any sensory communication between the mother and fetus is impossible. Therefore, non-local neuronal coupling mediates environmental learning early in cognition.

The notion of non-local neuronal coupling filled a gap in knowledge both in the Core Knowledge Theory and the group of positions in Externalism about the very beginning of cognition, which has also been shown by the binding problem, the perception stability problem, the excitatory inputs problem, and the problem of Morphogenesis. The nervous system of the young organism at the prenatal stage of development cannot alone solve the complexity of intentionality-perception development for beginning cognitive development. For the innate sensitivity to specific patterns of information (referred to as core domains according to the Core Knowledge Theory) or for pairing the relevant cue with a particular symbol saved in the sensorimotor structures (embodied information according to Externalism), the organism only with an ability of reflex responses should distinguish the relevant stimulus (an informative cue) from the environment with the cacophony of stimuli: electromagnetic waves, chemical interactions, and pressure fluctuations. The notion of non-local neuronal coupling explains the neurophysiological processes of Shared intentionality at the cellular level that reveal in young organisms the innate sensitivity and/or embodied meanings during cognition. The Shared intentionality approach shows how, at different levels of interaction, from interpersonal dynamics to neuronal coupling, the collaborative interaction emerges in the mother-child pairs for sharing the essential sensory stimulus of the actual cognitive event. Finally, research has already shown that the Shared intentionality magnitude can be assessed by emulating the mother-fetal communication model in dyads of mothers and children from 2 to 10 years old.

== Key Topics of Study in Cognitive Development ==
=== Language Acquisition ===
A major, well-studied process and consequence of cognitive development is language acquisition. The traditional view was that this is the result of deterministic, human-specific genetic structures and processes. Other traditions, however, have emphasized the role of social experience in language learning. However, the relation of gene activity, experience, and language development is now recognized as incredibly complex and difficult to specify. Language development is sometimes separated into learning of phonology (systematic organization of sounds), morphology (structure of linguistic units—root words, affixes, parts of speech, intonation, etc.), syntax (rules of grammar within sentence structure), semantics (study of meaning), and discourse or pragmatics (relation between sentences). However, all of these aspects of language knowledge—which were originally posited by the linguist Noam Chomsky to be autonomous or separate—are now recognized to interact in complex ways.

It was not until 1962 that bilingualism had been accepted as a contributing factor to cognitive development. There have been a number of studies showing how bilingualism contributes to the executive function of the brain, which is the main center at which cognitive development happens. According to Bialystok in "Bilingualism and the Development of Executive Function: The Role of Attention", children who are bilingual have to actively filter through the two different languages to select the one they need to use, which in turn makes the development stronger in that center.

== Other theories ==
=== Whorf's hypothesis ===
While working as a student of Edward Sapir, Benjamin Lee Whorf posited that a person's thinking depends on the structure and content of their social group's language. Per Whorf, language determines our thoughts and perceptions. For example, it used to be thought that the Greeks, who wrote left to right, thought differently than Egyptians since the Egyptians wrote right to left. Whorf's theory was so strict that he believed if a word is absent in a language, then the individual is unaware of the object's existence. This theory was played out in George Orwell's book, Animal Farm; the pig leaders slowly eliminated words from the citizen's vocabulary so that they were incapable of realizing what they were missing. The Whorfian hypothesis failed to recognize that people can still be aware of the concept or item, even though they lack efficient coding to quickly identify the target information.

=== Quine's bootstrapping hypothesis ===
Willard Van Orman Quine argued that there are innate conceptual biases that enable the acquisition of language, concepts, and beliefs. Quine's theory follows nativist philosophical traditions, such as the European rationalist philosophers, for example Immanuel Kant.

=== Neo-Piagetian theories ===
Neo-Piagetian theories of cognitive development emphasized the role of information processing mechanisms in cognitive development, such as attention control and working memory. They suggested that progression along Piagetian stages or other levels of cognitive development is a function of strengthening of control mechanisms and is within the stages themselves.

== Neuroscience ==
During development, especially the first few years of life, children show interesting patterns of neural development and a high degree of neuroplasticity. Neuroplasticity, as explained by the World Health Organization, can be summed up in three points.

1. Any adaptive mechanism used by the nervous system to repair itself after injury.
2. Any means by which the nervous system can repair individually damaged central circuits.
3. Any means by which the capacity of the central nervous system can adapt to new physiological conditions and environment.

The relation of brain development and cognitive development is extremely complex and, since the 1990s, has been a growing area of research.

Cognitive development and motor development may also be closely interrelated. When a person experiences a neurodevelopmental disorder and their cognitive development is disturbed, we often see adverse effects in motor development as well. Cerebellum, which is the part of brain that is most responsible for motor skills, has been shown to have significant importance in cognitive functions in the same way that prefrontal cortex has important duties in not only cognitive abilities but also development of motor skills. To support this, there is evidence of close co-activation of neocerebellum and dorsolateral prefrontal cortex in functional neuroimaging as well as abnormalities seen in both cerebellum and prefrontal cortex in the same developmental disorder. In this way, we see close interrelation of motor development and cognitive development and they cannot operate in their full capacity when either of them are impaired or delayed.

=== Cultural influences ===
From cultural psychologists' view, minds and culture shape each other. In other words, culture can influence brain structures which then influence our interpretation of the culture. These examples reveal cultural variations in neural responses:

==== Figure-line task ====
Behavioral research has shown that one's strength in independent (tasks which are focused on influencing others or oneself) or interdependent tasks (tasks where one changes their own behavior to favor others) differ based on their cultural context. In general, East Asian cultures are more interdependent whereas Western cultures are more independent. Hedden et al. assessed functional magnetic resonance imaging (fMRI) responses of East Asians and Americans while they performed independent (absolute) or interdependent (relative) tasks. The study showed that participants used regions of the brain associated with attentional control when they had to perform culturally incongruent tasks. In other words, neural paths used for the same task were different for Americans and East Asians.

==== Transcultural neuroimaging studies ====
New studies in transcultural neuroimaging studies have demonstrated that one's cultural background can influence the neural activity that underlies both high (for example, social cognition) and low (for example, perception) level cognitive functions. Studies demonstrated that groups that come from different cultures or that have been exposed to culturally different stimuli have differences in neural activity. For example, differences were found in that of the pre motor cortex during mental calculation and that of the VMPFC during trait judgements of one's mother from people with different cultural backgrounds. In conclusion, since differences were found in both high-level and low-level cognition one can assume that our brain's activity is strongly and, at least in part, constitutionally shaped by its sociocultural context.

==== Understanding of others' intentions ====
Kobayashi et al. compared American-English monolingual and Japanese-English bilingual children's brain responses in understanding others' intentions through false-belief story and cartoon tasks. They found universal activation of the region bilateral ventromedial prefrontal cortex in theory of mind tasks. However, American children showed greater activity in the left inferior frontal gyrus during the tasks whereas Japanese children had greater activity in the right inferior frontal gyrus during the Japanese Theory of Mind tasks. In conclusion, these examples suggest that the brain's neural activities are not universal but are culture dependent.

== In underrepresented groups ==
=== Deaf and hard-of-hearing ===
Being deaf or hard-of-hearing has been noted to impact cognitive development as hearing loss impacts social development, language acquisition, and the culture reacts to a deaf child. Cognitive development in academic achievement, reading development, language development, performance on standardized measures of intelligence, visual-spatial and memory skills, development of conceptual skills, and neuropsychological function are dependent upon the child's primary language of communication, either American Sign Language or English, as well as if the child is able to communicate and use the communication modality as a language. There is some research pointing to deficits in development of theory of mind in children who are deaf and hard-of-hearing which may be due to a lack of early conversational experience. Other research points to lower scores on the Wechsler Intelligence Scale for Children, especially in the Verbal Comprehension Index due differences in cultural knowledge acquisition.

=== Transgender people ===
Since the 2010s there has been an increase in research into how transgender people fit into cognitive development theory. At the earliest, transgender children can begin to socially transition during identity exploration. In 2015, Kristina Olson and colleagues studied transgender youth in comparison to their cisgender siblings and unrelated cisgender children. The students participated in the IAT, a test that measures how one may identify based on a series of questions related to memory. Overall it determines a child's gender preference. It showed that the transgender children's results correlated with their desired gender. The behaviors of the children also related back to their results. For instance, the transgender boys enjoyed food and activities typically associated and enjoyed by cisgender boys. The article reports that the researchers found that the children were not confused, deceptive, or oppositional of their gender identity, and responded with actions that are typically represented by their gender identity.

== See also ==
- Reuven Feuerstein – Israeli clinical, developmental and cognitive psychologist
- Developmental psychology – Scientific study of psychological changes in humans over the course of their lives
- Child development stages – Theoretical milestones of child development
- Infant cognitive development – How babies develop the ability to think and know things
- Human behaviour genetics – Field that examines the role of genetic and environmental influences on human behaviour
