= Centration =

Concept in psychology

In psychology, centration is the tendency to focus on one salient aspect of a situation and neglect other, possibly relevant aspects. Introduced by the Swiss psychologist Jean Piaget through his cognitive-developmental stage theory, centration is a behaviour often demonstrated in the preoperational stage. Piaget claimed that egocentrism, a common element responsible for preoperational children's unsystematic thinking, was causal to centration. Research on centration has primarily been made by Piaget, shown through his conservation tasks, while contemporary researchers have expanded on his ideas.

== Conservation tasks ==
Piaget used a number of tasks to test children's scientific thinking and reasoning, many of which specifically tested conservation. Conservation refers to the ability to determine that a certain quantity will remain the same despite adjustment of the container, shape, or apparent size. Other conservation tasks include conservation of number, substance, weight, volume, and length.

Perhaps the most famous task indicative of centration is the conservation of liquids task. In one version, the child is shown two glasses, A1 and A2, that are filled to the same height. The child is asked if the two glasses contain the same amount of liquid, in which the child almost always agrees that they do. Next, the experimenter pours the liquid from A2 to glass P, which is lower and wider. The child is then asked if the amount of liquid is still the same. At the preoperational stage, children will respond that the amount is not the same, with either the taller glass or the wider glass containing more liquid. Once the child has reached the concrete operational stage, however, the child will conclude the amount of liquid is still the same.

Here, centration is demonstrated in the fact that the child pays attention to one aspect of the liquid, either the height or the width, and is unable to conserve because of it. With achievement of the concrete operational stage, the child is able to reason about the two dimensions simultaneously and recognize that a change in one dimension cancels out a change in the other.

In the conservation of numbers task, Piaget gave children a row of egg cups and a bunch of eggs, placing them in rows of equal length, but not equal number. Piaget then asked the children to take just enough eggs to fill the cups, and when the children attempted to do so, they were surprised to find that they had too many or too few eggs. Again, centration is present here, where the child pays attention to the length of the rows and not the numbers within each row.

Children demonstrated conservation of weight and length through a similar task. In this one, children were shown two balls of Playdoh that were equal in size. When asked whether they were the same or not, all children answered that yes, they were. Afterwards, Piaget rolled one of the balls into a longer string and asked the same question: “Which one is bigger?”. Children who experienced centration focused on the length of the newly shaped Playdoh, or the width of the old Playdoh, and often said that one or the other was bigger. Those children who were able to focus on both dimensions, both length and width, were able to say that both clumps of Playdoh were still the same size.

== Egocentrism ==
Piaget believed that in each period of development, a deficit in cognitive thinking could be attributed to the concept of egocentrism. Egocentrism, then, refers to the inability to distinguish one's own perspective from that of others, but does not necessarily imply selfishness or conceit. In speech, children are egocentric when they consider matters only from their own perspective. For example, a young egocentric boy might want to buy his mother a toy car for her birthday. This would not be a selfish act, as he would be getting her a present, but it would be an action that did not take into account the fact that the mother might not like the car. The child would assume that his mother would be thinking the same thing as himself, and would therefore love to receive a toy car as a gift. Animism – the attribution of life to physical objects – also stems from egocentrism; children assumed that everything functions just as they do. As long as children are egocentric, they fail to realize the extent to which each person has private, subjective experiences. In terms of moral reasoning, young children regard rules from one perspective, as absolutes handed down from adults or authority figures. Just as the egocentric child views things from a single perspective, the child who fails to conserves focuses on only one aspect of the problem. For example, when water is poured from one glass into a shorter, broader one, the child ‘centers’ on a single striking dimension – the difference in height. The child cannot ‘decenter’ and consider two aspects of the situation at once. Centration, essentially, can be seen as a form of egocentrism in specific tasks involving scientific reasoning.

== Perseveration ==
While centration is a general tendency for children within various cognitive tasks, perseveration, on the other hand, is centration in excess. Perseveration can be defined as the continual repetition of a particular response (such as a word, phrase, or gesture) despite the absence or cessation of a stimulus. It is usually caused by brain injury or other organic disorder. In a broader sense, perseveration is used to describe a wide range of functionless behaviours that arise from a failure of the brain to either inhibit prepotent responses or to allow its usual progress to a different behavior. This includes impairment in set shifting and task switching in social and other contexts.

Perseveration and centration are connected, in that centration is a basis for perseveration, but perseveration itself is seen to be a symptom of injury. Where perseveration is more of an issue when seen in adults, centration is a deficit in children's thinking that can be overcome more easily, through typical developmental gains.

== Decentration ==
Children generally achieve conservation of liquids at about 7 years. When they do so, they are entering the stage of concrete operations. Overcoming centration can be seen in three main forms. First, the child might use the identity argument – that you haven't added or take any away, so it has to be the same. Second, the argument of compensation might be used, where the child states that tallness of the one glass and the wideness of the other glass cancel each other out. Third, an inversion reasoning is possible, where the child might suggest they are still the same because you can pour water from the wide glass back into the tall glass to create two equal looking glasses once again. Underlying these arguments are logical operations – mental actions that are reversible. Since these are mental actions, the child does not actually need to perform or have seen the transformations they are talking about.

Piaget argued that children master centration and conservation spontaneously. The crucial moment comes when the child is in a state of internal contradiction. This is shown when the child first says that one glass has more because it's taller, than says the other has more because it is wider, and then becomes confused. Once this internal contradiction is resolved by the child themselves, by taking into account multiple aspects of the problem, they decenter and move up onto the concrete operational stage.

Multitasking, seen through cognitive flexibility and set-shifting, requires decentration so that attention may be shifted between multiple salient objects or situations. As well, decentration is essential to reading and math skills in order for children to move beyond the individual letters and to the words and meanings presented.

== Other research ==
As shown earlier, the aspect of quantitative understanding that most interested Piaget was the child's ability to conserve quantities in the face of perceptual change. Later studies have not disproved Piaget's contention that a full understanding of conservation is a concrete operational achievement. Recent work does suggest, however, that there may be earlier, partial forms of understanding that were missed in his studies.

Investigators have simplified conservation tasks in various ways. They have reduced the usual verbal demands, for example, by allowing the child to pick candies to eat or juice to drink rather than answer questions about “same” or “more.” Or they have made the context for the question more natural and familiar by embedding the task within an ongoing game. Although such changes do not eliminate the non-conservation error completely, they often result in improved performance by supposedly preoperational 4- and 5-year-olds. Indeed, in simple situations, even 3-year-olds can demonstrate some knowledge of the invariance of number. A study by Rochel Gelman provides a nice example. In her study, the 3-year-old participants first played a game in which they learned, over a series of trials, that a plate with three toy mice affixed to was a “winner” and a plate with two toy mice was a “loser.” Then, in a critical test trial, the three-mice plate was surreptitiously transformed while hidden. In some cases, the length of the row was changed; in other cases one of the mice was removed. The children were unfazed by the change in length, continuing to treat the plate was a winner. An actual change in number, however, was responded to quite differently, eliciting search behaviours and various attempt at an explanation. The children thus showed a recognition that number, at least in this situation, should remain invariant.

One should note, however, that studies purporting to show earlier competence on conservation tasks have themselves been criticized. In particular, these critiques suggest that methodological changes in the early competence studies may bias younger children to conserve due to lower level mechanisms. Children's complete of these tasks, therefore, may be due more to perceptual mechanisms rather than cognitive mechanisms of true conservation and an understanding of invariance. Thus, children may simply be sensitive to discriminating the delete or addition of information, rather than conserving information across changes in the display.

== See also ==
- Conservation (psychology)
