= Kurt W. Fischer =

American professor (1943–2020)

- Born: June 9, 1943; Baltimore, Maryland
- Died: March 30, 2020 (aged 76); Jamaica Plain, Massachusetts
- Education: B.A., Yale University; Ph.D., Harvard University
- Known for: dynamic skill theory, a neo-Piagetian theory of cognitive development; founder of Mind Brain and Education program at Harvard and International Mind, Brain and Education Society
- Scientific career
- Fields: Sociology; Cognitive Psychology; Developmental psychology
- Workplaces: University of Denver; Harvard University

Kurt W. Fischer (June 9, 1943 – March 30, 2020) was an educator, author, and researcher in the field of neuroscience and education. Until his retirement in 2015, he was the Charles Bigelow Professor of Education and Director of the Mind, Brain, and Education Program at Harvard Graduate School of Education. Fischer studied cognitive and emotional development and learning. His work, called dynamic skill theory, is considered to be one of the Neo-Piagetian theories of cognitive development. It offers an explanation for both consistency and variability in developmental patterns.

In later years, his focus was on the interdisciplinary field of Mind, Brain and Education. In the 1990s, Fischer with Howard Gardner and David Rose developed the Mind, Brain, and Education Program at the Harvard Graduate School of Education, which was the leading program in its area. Along with David Daniel, he founded the International Mind, Brain, and Education Society for which he served as the inaugural president. In 2007, Fischer and Daniel founded the official journal of the International Mind, Brain, and Education Society, Mind, Brain, and Education, for which Fischer served as founding editor-in-chief for over half a decade.

== Notable publications ==
- Fischer, K. W. (1980). A theory of cognitive development: The control and construction of hierarchies of skills. Psychological Review, 87, 477–531.
- Fischer, K. W., Shaver, P., & Carnchan, P. (1989). A skill approach to emotional development: From basic- to subordinate-category emotions. In W. Damon (Ed.), Child development today and tomorrow (pp. 107–136). San Francisco: Jossey-Bass.
- Fischer, K. W., & Rose, S. P. (1994). Dynamic development of coordination of components in brain and behavior: A framework for theory and research. In G. Dawson & K. W. Fischer (Eds.), Human behavior and the developing brain. (pp. 3–66). New York: Guilford Press.
- Fischer, K. W., Ayoub, C., Singh, I., Noam, G., Maraganore, A., & Raya, P. (1997). Psychopathology as adaptive development along distinctive pathways. Development & Psychopathology, 9, 749–779.
- Fischer, K. W., & Bidell, T. R. (2006). Dynamic development of action, thought, and emotion. In R. M. Lerner (Ed.), Handbook of child psychology. Vol 1: Theoretical models of human development(6th ed., pp. 313–399 ). New York: Wiley.
- Fischer, K. W., Daniel, D., Immordino-Yang, M. H., Stern, E., Battro, A., & Koizumi, H. (2007) Why Mind, Brain, and Education? Why Now? Mind, Brain, and Education, 1(1), 1–2.
- Fischer, K. W., & Fusaro, M. (2007). Using student interests to motivate learning. In R. P. Fink & J. Samuels (Eds.), Inspiring success: Reading interest and motivation in an age of high-stakes testing (pp. 62–74). Newark DE: International Reading Association.
- Fischer, K. W., Bernstein, J. H., & Immordino-Yang, M. H. (Eds.). (2007) Mind, brain, and education in reading disorders. Cambridge U.K.: Cambridge University Press.
- Battro, A.M., Fischer, K.W., & Lena, P. (2008). (Eds.) Visual learning and the brain: Lessons from dyslexia. Mind, Brain, and Education, 1(3), 127–137.
- Fischer, K.W., & Immordino-Yang, M.H. (2008) The fundamental importance of the brain and learning for education. In Jossey-Bass reader on the brain and learning (pp. xvii-xi). San Francisco: Jossey-Bass.
- Stein, Z., Dawson, T., & Fischer, K. W. (2010 ). Redesigning testing: Operationalizing the new science of learning. In M. S. Khine & I. M. Saleh (Eds.), New Science of Learning: Cognition, Computers and Collaboration in Education (pp. 207–224). New York: Springer.
- Fischer, K. W., & Heikkinen, K. (2010). The future of educational neuroscience. In D. A. Sousa (Ed.), Mind, brain, and education: Neuroscience implications for the classroom (pp. 248–269). Bloomington, IN: Solution Tree.
