= Conservation (psychology) =

Logical thinking ability

Conservation refers to a logical thinking ability that allows a person to determine that a certain quantity will remain the same despite adjustment of the container, shape, or apparent size, according to the psychologist Jean Piaget. His theory posits that this ability is not present in children during the preoperational stage of their development at ages 2–7 but develops in the concrete operational stage from ages 7–11.

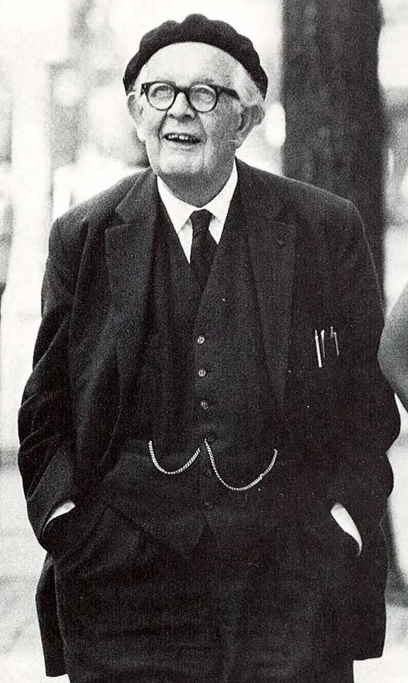
Jean Piaget in Ann Arbor, Michigan, c. 1968

== Tasks ==
Conservation tasks test a child’s ability to see that some properties are conserved or invariant after an object undergoes physical transformation. The following tasks also explain the different types of conservation. Piaget proposed that children's inability to conserve is due to weakness in the way children think during the preoperational stage (ages 2–6). This stage of cognitive development is characterized by children focusing on a single, salient dimension of height or length, while ignoring other important attributes of an object. Children during this stage also tend to focus on the static characteristics of objects, instead of focusing on when objects undergo changes, which is a critical element of the following tasks.

For conservation of number, the task designed to test children involves a set of several sticks or round counters. These counters (usually 6 for a 6-year-old) are placed into two parallel, horizontal lines that are the same length. Then the researcher spreads out the counters in one of the lines, to make that line longer than the other. The researcher then asks, "Is there the same number or a different number of counters in each line?" A child who cannot conserve will answer that there are more counters in the longer line, while a child who can conserve will recognize that there are the same number of counters in each line. While the child watches, the tester then reassembles the lines of counters so that the two lines are equal in length and has the child agree they are the same length. The tester moves the counters in one line closer together, so that the line is shorter and again asks if the two lines have an equal number of counters in each line, or if there are a different number in each line. The child who can conserve will once again recognize that the two lines have the same number of counters in each line.

=== Solid quantity ===
For conservation of solid quantity, the task designed to assess children involves two lumps of clay. The researcher first rolls the two lumps into the same shape. Then the researcher stretches out one of the balls into a long shape. The researcher asks the child whether the two clay shapes have the same amount of clay or a different amount. A child that cannot conserve will answer that the shapes have different amounts of clay—that the long shape has more. The child who can conserve will understand that they still both have the same amount of clay. Conservation of solid quantity is harder for children to learn than conservation of liquid and occurs later.

=== Weight/mass ===
For conservation of weight/mass, the task involves two lumps of clay and a balance. The experimenter places two equal balls of clay onto either side of a balance and shows that the weights are the same. The experimenter then molds one ball of clay into an oblong shape, and asks the child if the two pieces of clay will still weigh the same amount. A child who cannot conserve will answer that they now weigh a different amount, while a child who can conserve will recognize that shape does not affect weight/mass and respond that they weigh the same amount.

== Age ==
The ages at which children are able to complete conservation tasks varies; individual differences can cause some children to develop the ability later or earlier than others. Also age can vary across different countries (see conservation across cultures). However most children are not able to perform the conservation of number task correctly from ages 4–5, and most children develop the ability from ages 6–8. Conservation of mass and length occurs around age 7, conservation of weight around age 9, and conservation of volume around 11.

Piaget's studies of conservation led him to observe the stages which children pass through when gaining the ability to conserve. In the first stage, children do not yet have the ability to conserve. During the conservation of liquid task, children will respond that a liquid in a tall glass always has more liquid than that of a short glass; they cannot discern height from amount. In the second stage, children expand their judgments in the conservation of liquid task to also include width as a reason; they may answer that a shorter, stouter glass has more liquid than a tall, skinny glass. In the third stage, children have gained the ability to conserve, and recognize that height and width do not affect amount. Conservers believe more firmly in their answers on conservation tasks, when paired with non-conservers as partners, and they are able to offer multiple explanations and are more likely to manipulate the task materials to prove their point than non-conservers.

In many cases, training tasks are successful in teaching non-conserving children to correctly complete conservation tasks. Children as young as four years of age can be trained to conserve using operant training; this involves repeating conservation tasks and reinforcing correct responses while correcting incorrect responses. The effects of training on one conservation task (such as conservation of liquid) often transfer to other conservation tasks.

== In connection with education ==
Research shows that conserving children demonstrate greater fluency in separately timed addition and subtraction problems than non-conserving children. This research highlights the importance of logical-reversible thought, an element necessary to conserve, as being a critical component to a child's ability to perform inverse mathematical problems fluently (5 + 2 = 7; 7 − 5 = 2). For nonconserving children, research indicates that teachers should engage with children and ask them questions often about objects in their surrounds to encourage the development of more logical thinking.

== Across cultures ==
Most studies indicate that conservation occurs in a similar sequence and at similar ages across cultures, but that there are differences in the rate at which conservation (and other cognitive abilities) are acquired across cultures. For example one study examining U.S. and Zambian female adolescents found no difference in their ability to answer questions indicating the ability to conserve in conservation of weight/mass tests. Another study looked at children from many countries (Australia, Netherlands, England, New Zealand, Poland, and Uganda) and tested for the ages at which conservation appears. They found that the rate at which children acquired conservation varied slightly in different countries, but that the age trends for when conservation develops are similar across borders despite cultural upbringing. A review of cross-cultural studies looking at Piagetian tasks supported this finding, and found that while the general stages of cognitive development outlined by Piaget do occur across cultures, the rate of development is not consistent across cultures and sometimes the final stage of formal operations is not reached by children in all cultures, due to lack of experiences which would help develop this kind of thinking.

A great deal of care should be taken in cross-cultural examinations of conservation in order to avoid obtaining biased results. For example, one study that tested adolescents belonging to the Wolof people of Senegal found they were not able to conserve in a conservation of liquid task. However another study suggests that their interpretation of the experimenter’s purpose may have conflicted with giving straightforward answers to the standard Piagetian questions because - except in school interrogation - Wolof people seldom ask questions to which they already know the answers. When presented with the task as language-learning questions about the meaning of quantity terms such as "more" and "the same", the responses reflected understanding of conservation.

== Criticism of research methods ==
The conservation tasks (and hence Piaget's theory) have been criticized on a number of fronts in regards to research methods. Many studies have looked at variations of the conservation tasks and how these variations affect children's responses. For example, studies show that children need to be assessed both verbally and non-verbally, as assessing them solely in a verbal manner can yield test results suggesting that some children are unable to conserve, while in actuality some children are only able to answer conservation tasks correctly in a non-verbal manner.

Research has suggested that asking the same question twice leads young children to change their answer as they assume that they are being asked again because they got it wrong first time around. The importance of context was also emphasized by researchers who altered the task so that a 'naughty teddy' changed the array rather than an experimenter themselves. This seemed to give children a clear reason for the second question being asked, and four-year-old children were able to demonstrate knowledge of the conservation of matter much earlier than Piaget's reported 7- to 11-year-old threshold for concrete operations.

== In non-human primates ==
Research has also examined whether non-human primates are able to conserve. Chimpanzees are able to make judgements on whether two quantities of liquid are the same or different, and they are able to conserve correctly when liquids are transformed based on inferences. They are also able to correctly conserve for solid quantities, but they are not able to demonstrate conservation of number. Orangutans are able to differentiate between same and different quantities of liquid, but they are only able to "pseudoconserve", in a manner similar to children in the second stage of conservation development, and ultimately fail to demonstrate complete conservation of liquid (see Age).

== See also ==
- Piaget's theory of cognitive development
