= Educational aims and objectives =

Desired result of an educational process

Although the noun forms of the three words aim, objective and goal are often used synonymously, professionals in organised education define the educational aims and objectives more narrowly and consider them to be distinct from each other: aims are concerned with purpose whereas objectives are concerned with achievement.

Usually an educational objective relates to gaining an ability, a skill, some knowledge, a new attitude etc. rather than having merely completed a given task. Since the achievement of objectives usually takes place during the course and the aims look forward into the student's career and life beyond the course one can expect the aims of a course to be relatively more long term than the objectives of that same course.

Course objectives are a relatively shorter term goal which successful learners will achieve within the scope of the course itself. Objectives are often worded in course documentation in a way that explains to learners what they should try to achieve as they learn.

== Learning outcomes ==
The term learning outcome is used in many educational organisations, in particular in higher education where learning outcomes are statements about what students should be able to do by the end of a teaching session. Learning outcomes are then aligned to educational assessments, with the teaching and learning activities linking the two, a structure known as constructive alignment. Writing good learning outcomes can also make use of the SMART criteria. Types of learning outcomes taxonomy include:

- Bloom's taxonomy
- Structure of observed learning outcome (SOLO)
- DIKW pyramid
- Model of hierarchical complexity

In some organisations the term learning outcome is used in the part of a course description where aims are normally found. One can equate aims to intended learning outcomes and objectives to measured learning outcomes. A third category of learning outcome is the unintended learning outcome which would include beneficial outcomes that were neither planned nor sought but are simply observed.

Critical thinking can be more challenging to formalize and assess through learning outcomes. The effect of different teaching methods on outcomes of learning was found to be generally small or insignificant. Some outcomes of learning can be quickly forgotten.

== See also ==
- Concept inventory
- Educational psychology
- Evidence-based education
- Instructional scaffolding
- Learning standards
- Mastery learning
- Outline of educational aims
- Rubric (academic)
