= Robert Kegan =

American psychologist

Robert Kegan (born August 24, 1946) is an American developmental psychologist. He is a licensed psychologist and practicing therapist, lectures to professional and lay audiences, and consults in the area of professional development and organization development.

He was the William and Miriam Meehan Professor in Adult Learning and Professional Development at Harvard Graduate School of Education. He taught there for forty years until his retirement in 2016. He was also Educational Chair for the Institute for Management and Leadership in Education and the co-director for the Change Leadership Group.

== Education and early career ==
Born in Minnesota, Kegan attended Dartmouth College, graduating summa cum laude in 1968. He described the civil rights movement and the movement against the Vietnam War as formative experiences during his college years. He took his "collection of interests in learning from a psychological and literary and philosophical point of view" to Harvard University, where he earned his Ph.D. in 1977.

== The Evolving Self ==
In his book The Evolving Self (1982), Kegan explored human life problems from the perspective of a single process which he called meaning-making, the activity of making sense of experience through discovering and resolving problems. As he wrote, "Thus it is not that a person makes meaning, as much as that activity of being a person is the activity of meaning-making." The purpose of the book is primarily to give professional helpers (such as counselors, psychotherapists, and coaches) a broad, developmental framework for empathizing with their clients' different ways of making sense of their problems.

Kegan described meaning-making as a lifelong activity that begins in early infancy and can evolve in complexity through a series of "evolutionary truces" (or "evolutionary balances") that establish a balance between self and other (in psychological terms), or subject and object (in philosophical terms), or organism and environment (in biological terms). Each evolutionary truce is both an achievement of and a constraint on meaning-making, possessing both strengths and limitations. Each subsequent evolutionary truce is a new, more refined, solution to the lifelong tension between how people are connected, attached, and included (integrated with other people and the world), and how people are distinct, independent, and autonomous (differentiated from other people and the rest of the world).

Kegan adapted Donald Winnicott's idea of the holding environment and proposed that the evolution of meaning-making is a life history of holding environments, or cultures of embeddedness. Kegan described cultures of embeddedness in terms of three processes: confirmation (holding on), contradiction (letting go), and continuity (staying put for reintegration).

For Kegan, "the person is more than an individual"; developmental psychology studies the evolution of cultures of embeddedness, not the study of isolated individuals. He wrote, "One of the most powerful features of this psychology, in fact, is its capacity to liberate psychological theory from the study of the decontextualized individual. Constructive-developmental psychology reconceives the whole question of the relationship between the individual and the social by reminding that the distinction is not absolute, that development is intrinsically about the continual settling and resettling of this very distinction."

Kegan argued that some of the psychological distress that people experience (including some depression and anxiety) are a result of the "natural emergencies" that occur when "the terms of our evolutionary truce must be renegotiated" and a new, more refined, culture of embeddedness must emerge.

The Evolving Self attempted a theoretical integration of three different intellectual traditions in psychology. The first is the humanistic and existential-phenomenological tradition (which includes Martin Buber, Prescott Lecky, Abraham Maslow, Rollo May, Ludwig Binswanger, Andras Angyal, and Carl Rogers). The second is the neo-psychoanalytic tradition (which includes Anna Freud, Erik Erikson, Ronald Fairbairn, Donald Winnicott, Margaret Mahler, Harry Guntrip, John Bowlby, and Heinz Kohut). The third is what Kegan calls the constructive-developmental tradition (which includes James Mark Baldwin, John Dewey, George Herbert Mead, Jean Piaget, Lawrence Kohlberg, William G. Perry, and Jane Loevinger). The book is also strongly influenced by dialectical philosophy and psychology (Note: Kegan cites the dialectical psychology of Michael Basseches, and Basseches in turn was influenced by Kegan. In Basseches (1989), Basseches argued that structural developmental stage theories such as those proposed in Kegan (1982) and Kegan (1994) are best understood as general philosophical frameworks, not as psychological constructs that explain the complexity and diversity of individuals' meaning-making. Later, Basseches and Mascolo explained: "Although we embrace both Piagetian models of psychological change and their organization into justifications of what constitutes epistemic progress (the development of more adequate knowledge), there are several aspects of Piagetian theory that we find limiting and attempt to transcend in our view of the nature of development. Most prominent among these are (a) the theory of global stages, (b) imprecision in identifying levels of psychological development, and (c) a lack of emphasis on social and cultural relations as constitutive of developmental change.") and by Carol Gilligan's psychology of women.

Kegan presented a sequence of six evolutionary balances: incorporative, impulsive, imperial, interpersonal, institutional, and interindividual. The following table is a composite of several tables in The Evolving Self that summarize these balances. The object (O) of each balance is the subject (S) of the preceding balance. Kegan uses the term subject to refer to things that people are "subject to" but not necessarily consciously aware of. He uses the term object to refer to things that people are aware of and can take control of. The process of emergence of each evolutionary balance is described in detail in the text of the book; as Kegan said, his primary interest is the ontogeny of these balances, not just their taxonomy.

| Evolutionary balance | Culture of embeddedness | Analogue in Piaget | Analogue in Kohlberg | Analogue in Loevinger | Analogue in Maslow | Analogue in McClelland/Murray | Analogue in Erikson |
|---|---|---|---|---|---|---|---|
| (0) Incorporative: S: reflexes, sensing, and moving; O: nothing | Mothering culture. Mothering one(s) or primary caretaker(s). | Sensorimotor | — | Pre-social | Physiological survival orientation | — | — |
| (1) Impulsive: S: impulse and perception; O: reflexes, sensing, and moving | Parenting culture. Typically, the family triangle. | Preoperational | Punishment and obedience orientation | Impulsive | Physiological satisfaction orientation | — | Initiative vs. guilt |
| (2) Imperial: S: enduring disposition, needs, interests, wishes; O: impulse and perception | Role-recognizing culture. School and family as institutions of authority and role differentiation. Peer gang which requires role-taking. | Concrete operational | Instrumental orientation | Opportunistic | Safety orientation | Power orientation | Industry vs. inferiority |
| (3) Interpersonal: S: mutuality, interpersonal concordance; O: enduring disposition, needs, interests, wishes | Culture of mutuality. Mutually reciprocal one-to-one relationships. | Early formal operational | Interpersonal concordance orientation | Conformist | Love, affection, belongingness orientation | Affiliation orientation | (Affiliation vs. abandonment?) |
| (4) Institutional: S: personal autonomy, self-system identity; O: mutuality, interpersonal concordance | Culture of identity or self-authorship (in love or work). Typically: group involvement in career, admission to public arena. | Full formal operational | Societal orientation | Conscientious | Esteem and self-esteem orientation | Achievement orientation | Identity vs. identity diffusion |
| (5) Interindividual: S: interpenetration of systems; O: personal autonomy, self-system identity | Culture of intimacy (in love and work). Typically: genuine adult love relationship. | (Post-formal; Dialectical?) | Principled orientation | Autonomous | Self-actualization | (Intimacy orientation?) | — |

The final chapter of The Evolving Self, titled "Natural Therapy", is a meditation on the philosophical and ethical fundamentals of the helping professions. Kegan argued, similarly to later theorists of asset-based community development, that professional helpers should base their practice on people's existing strengths and "natural" capabilities. The careful practice of "unnatural" (self-conscious) professional intervention may be important and valuable, said Kegan; nevertheless "rather than being the panacea for modern maladies, it is actually a second-best means of support, and arguably a sign that the natural facilitation of development has somehow and for some reason broken down". Helping professionals need a way of evaluating the quality of people's evolving cultures of embeddedness to provide opportunities for problem-solving and growth, while acknowledging that the evaluators also have their own evolving cultures of embeddedness. Kegan warned that professional helpers should not delude themselves into thinking that their conceptions of health and development are unbiased by their particular circumstances or partialities. He acknowledged the importance of Thomas Szasz's suggestion that 'mental illness is a kind of myth', and he said that we need a way to address what Szasz calls "problems in living" while protecting clients as much as possible from the helping professional's partialities and limitations.

The Evolving Self has been cited favorably by Mihaly Csikszentmihalyi, Ronald A. Heifetz, Ruthellen Josselson, and George Vaillant. Despite the book's wealth of human stories, some readers have found it difficult to read due to the density of Kegan's writing and its conceptual complexity.

== In Over Our Heads ==
Kegan's book In Over Our Heads (1994) extends his perspective on psychological development formulated in The Evolving Self. What he earlier called "evolutionary truces" of increasing subject–object complexity are now called "orders of consciousness". The book explores what happens, and how people feel, when new orders of consciousness emerge, or fail to emerge, in various domains. These domains include parenting (families), partnering (couples), working (companies), healing (psychotherapies), and learning (schools). He connects the concept of orders of consciousness with the idea of a hidden curriculum of everyday life.

Kegan repeatedly points to the suffering that can result when people are presented with challenging tasks and expectations without the necessary support to master them. In addition, he now distinguishes between orders of consciousness (cognitive complexity) and styles (stylistic diversity). Theories of style describe "preferences about the way we know, rather than competencies or capacities in our knowing, as is the case with subject–object principles". The book continues the same combination of detailed storytelling and theoretical analysis found in his earlier book, but presents a "more complex bi-theoretical approach" rather than the single subject–object theory he presented in The Evolving Self.

In the last chapter, "On Being Good Company for the Wrong Journey", Kegan warns that it is easy to misconceive the nature of the mental transformations that a person needs or seeks to make. Regardless of the virtues of higher orders of consciousness, we cannot be expected to master them if we are not ready or lack the necessary support, and we are unlikely to be helped by someone who wrongly assumes that we are operating at a certain order of consciousness. He ends with an epilogue on the value of passionate engagement and the creative unpredictability of human lives.

In Over Our Heads has been cited favorably by Morton Deutsch, John Heron, David A. Kolb, and Jack Mezirow.

== How the Way We Talk Can Change the Way We Work and Immunity to Change ==
The book How the Way We Talk Can Change the Way We Work (2001), co-authored by Robert Kegan and Lisa Laskow Lahey, jettisons the theoretical framework of Kegan's earlier books The Evolving Self and In Over Our Heads and instead presents a practical method, called the immunity map, which is intended to help readers overcome an immunity to change. Immunity to change refers to the "processes of dynamic equilibrium, which, like an immune system, powerfully and mysteriously tend to keep things pretty much as they are" in people's mindsets and behavior.

The immunity map continues the general dialectical pattern of Kegan's earlier thinking but without any explicit use of the concept of "evolutionary truces" or "orders of consciousness". The immunity map primarily consists of a four-column worksheet that is gradually filled in by individuals or groups of people during a structured process of self-reflective inquiry. This involves asking questions such as: What are the changes that we think we need to make? What are we doing or not doing to prevent ourselves (immunize ourselves) from making those changes? What anxieties and big assumptions does our doing or not doing imply? How can we test those big assumptions so as to disturb our immunity to change and make possible new learning and change?

Kegan and Lahey progressively introduce each of the four columns of the immunity map in four chapters that show how to transform people's way of talking to themselves and others. In each case, the transformation in people's way of talking is a shift from a habitual and unreflective pattern to a more deliberate and self-reflective pattern. The four transformations, each of which corresponds to a column of the immunity map, are:

- "From the language of complaint to the language of commitment"
- "From the language of blame to the language of personal responsibility"
- "From the language of New Year's resolutions to the language of competing commitments"
- "From the language of big assumptions that hold us to the language of assumptions we hold"

In three subsequent chapters, Kegan and Lahey present three transformations that groups of people can make in their social behavior, again from a lesser to greater self-reflective pattern:

- "From the language of prizes and praising to the language of ongoing regard"
- "From the language of rules and policies to the language of public agreement"
- "From the language of constructive criticism to the language of deconstructive criticism"

Immunity to Change (2009), the next book by Kegan and Lahey, revisits the immunity map of their previous book. The authors describe three dimensions of immunity to change: the change-preventing system (thwarting challenging aspirations), the feeling system (managing anxiety), and the knowing system (organizing how we understand reality). They further illustrate their method with a number of actual case studies from their experiences as consultants, and they connect the method to a dialectic of three mindsets, called socialized mind, self-authoring mind, and self-transforming mind. (These correspond to the interpersonal, institutional, and interindividual "evolutionary truces" or "orders of consciousness" in Kegan's earlier books.) Kegan and Lahey also borrow and incorporate some frameworks and methods from other thinkers, including Ronald A. Heifetz's distinction between technical and adaptive learning, Chris Argyris's ladder of inference, and a reworded version of the four stages of competence. They also provide more detailed guidance on how to test big assumptions.

The revised immunity map worksheet, introduced in Immunity to Change, has five interlinked columns designed to target anxiety mechanisms that contribute to an immunity to change:

- (0) Generating ideas: Individuals will undergo self-reflective processes to diagnose problems in life that inhibit development. These problems typically transcend both the workplace and home life and affect most aspects of life, including relationships.
- (1) Commitment (improvement) goals: In this column, individuals make commitment goals stated in a positive way focusing on development rather than what actions will cease. These goals emphasize proactive actions, solidifying commitment. The goal is something that an individual feels a deep need to improve.
- (2) Doing / not doing: This step includes identifying actions that hinder individuals from achieving their commitment goals. It goes beyond general behavior and focuses on individual actions that occur throughout everyday life.
- (3) Hidden competing commitment (and worry box): The hidden competing commitment column often evokes a visceral reaction as it develops into unpleasant emotions stemming from deep-rooted fears and worries. To fill this column, individuals examine the doing and not doing column and imagine doing the opposite. Hidden competing commitments represent unspoken or unconscious actions that protect individuals from experiencing their worries and fears.
- (4) Big assumption: The big assumption refers to an individual's relevant views of the world, the foundation for the hidden competing commitments. Many individuals hold on to such views, even if they are misconstrued or inaccurately represent life.
- (5) First S-M-A-R-T test: Safe, Modest, Actionable, Research stance (not a self-improvement stance), Testable: Such tests are employed to challenge big assumptions. The tests are safe and modest in what actions an individual can undertake. It is testable because there of a source of measurement to compare data.

The immunity-to-change framework has been cited favorably by Chris Argyris, Kenneth J. Gergen, Manfred F.R. Kets de Vries, and Tony Schwartz.

== An Everyone Culture ==
The book An Everyone Culture: Becoming a Deliberately Developmental Organization (2016) was co-authored by Robert Kegan, Lisa Laskow Lahey, Matthew L. Miller, Andy Fleming, and Deborah Helsing. The authors connect the concept of the deliberately developmental organization (DDO) with adult development theory and argue that creating conditions for employees to successfully navigate through the transitions from socialized mind to self-authoring mind to self-transforming mind (described in Kegan's earlier works) "has a business value", at least in part because they expect demand for employees with more complex mindsets "will intensify in the years ahead". Three different and successful DDOs are introduced and analyzed throughout the book. These DDOs are Next Jump, Bridgewater Associates, and The Decurion Corporation. Kegan, along with his fellow co-authors, explore the successful business practices that promote a culture where individual growth and personal satisfaction can flourish.

The book elaborates on three concepts that the authors believe to be critical to the success of a DDO. These three concepts are what they refer to as "edge", "groove", and "home". The "edge" of a DDO is the drive of the organization to uncover weaknesses and to develop. The "groove" is the practices or "flow" of the company from day-to-day that foster development. "Home" is the supportive community within a DDO that allows people to be vulnerable and trust each other. The authors emphasize that underlying each of these parts of a DDO is the idea that adults are truly capable of continuous improvement and development. The authors also explain that for DDOs, the goals of adult development and business success are not mutually exclusive, but both ultimately become one objective.

== Reception ==
Adult education professor Ann K. Brooks criticized Kegan's book In Over Our Heads. She claimed that Kegan fell victim to a cultural "myopia" that "perfectly reflects the rationalist values of modern academia". Brooks also said that Kegan excluded "the possibility of a developmental trajectory aimed at increased connection with others". Ruthellen Josselson, in contrast, said that Kegan "has made the most heroic efforts" to balance individuality and connection with others in his work.

In an interview with Otto Scharmer in 2000, Kegan expressed self-criticism toward his earlier writings; Kegan told Scharmer: "I can go back and look at things I've written and think, ugh, this is a pretty raw and distorted way of stating what I think I understand much better now."

In the 2009 book Psychotherapy as a Developmental Process by psychologists Michael Basseches and Michael Mascolo—a book which Kegan called "the closest thing we have to a 'unified field theory' for psychotherapy"—Basseches and Mascolo said that they "embrace both Piagetian models of psychological change and their organization into justifications of what constitutes epistemic progress (the development of more adequate knowledge)". However, Basseches and Mascolo rejected theories of global developmental stages, such as those in Kegan's earlier writings, in favor of a more finely differentiated conception of development that focuses on "the emergence of specific skills, experiences, and behavioral dispositions over the course of psychotherapy as a developmental process".

== Key publications ==
- Kegan, Robert; Lahey, Lisa Laskow; Miller, Matthew L.; Fleming, Andy; Helsing, Deborah (2016). An everyone culture: becoming a deliberately developmental organization. Boston: Harvard Business Review Press. ISBN 978-1-62527-862-3. OCLC 907194200.
- Kegan, Robert; Lahey, Lisa Laskow (2009). Immunity to change: how to overcome it and unlock potential in yourself and your organization. Boston: Harvard Business Press. ISBN 978-0-7879-6378-1. OCLC 44972130.
- Wagner, Tony; Kegan, Robert (2006). Change leadership: a practical guide to transforming our schools. San Francisco: Jossey-Bass. ISBN 978-0-7879-7755-9. OCLC 61748276.
- Kegan, Robert; Lahey, Lisa Laskow (2001). How the way we talk can change the way we work: seven languages for transformation. San Francisco: Jossey-Bass. ISBN 978-0-7879-6378-1. OCLC 44972130.
- Kegan, Robert (1994). In over our heads: the mental demands of modern life. Cambridge, MA: Harvard University Press. doi:10.2307/j.ctv1pncpfb. ISBN 978-0-674-44588-8. JSTOR j.ctv1pncpfb. OCLC 29565488.
- Kegan, Robert (1982). The evolving self: problem and process in human development. Cambridge, MA: Harvard University Press. ISBN 978-0-674-27231-6. JSTOR j.ctvjz81q8. OCLC 7672087.
- Kegan, Robert (1976). The sweeter welcome: voices for a vision of affirmation—Bellow, Malamud, and Martin Buber. Needham Heights, MA: Humanitas Press. ISBN 978-0-911628-25-8. OCLC 2952603.

== See also ==
- Bloom's taxonomy
- Coherence therapy § Hierarchical organization of constructs
- Constructive developmental framework
- Double-loop learning
- Educational assessment
- GROW model
- Higher-order thinking
- Integrative complexity
- Integrative level
- Model of hierarchical complexity
- Neo-Piagetian theories of cognitive development
- Positive adult development
- Reflective equilibrium
- Reflective practice
- Rubric (academic)
- Sensemaking
- Structure of observed learning outcome
