= Model of hierarchical complexity =

Framework for scoring a behavior's complexity

The model of hierarchical complexity (MHC) is a framework for scoring how complex a behavior is, such as verbal reasoning or other cognitive tasks. It quantifies the order of hierarchical complexity of a task based on mathematical principles of how the information is organized, in terms of information science. This model was developed by Michael Commons and Francis Richards in the early 1980s.

== Overview ==
The model of hierarchical complexity (MHC) is a formal theory and a mathematical psychology framework for scoring how complex a behavior is. Developed by Michael Lamport Commons and colleagues, it quantifies the order of hierarchical complexity of a task based on mathematical principles of how the information is organized, in terms of information science. Its forerunner was the general stage model.

Behaviors that may be scored include those of individual humans or their social groupings (e.g., organizations, governments, societies), animals, or machines. It enables scoring the hierarchical complexity of task accomplishment in any domain. It is based on the very simple notions that higher order task actions:

1. are defined in terms of the next lower ones (creating hierarchy);
2. organize the next lower actions;
3. organize lower actions in a non-arbitrary way (differentiating them from simple chains of behavior).

It is cross-culturally and cross-species valid. The reason it applies cross-culturally is that the scoring is based on the mathematical complexity of the hierarchical organization of information. Scoring does not depend upon the content of the information (e.g., what is done, said, written, or analyzed) but upon how the information is organized.

The MHC is a non-mentalistic model of developmental stages. It specifies 16 orders of hierarchical complexity and their corresponding stages. It is different from previous proposals about developmental stage applied to humans; instead of attributing behavioral changes across a person's age to the development of mental structures or schema, this model posits that task sequences of task behaviors form hierarchies that become increasingly complex. Because less complex tasks must be completed and practiced before more complex tasks can be acquired, this accounts for the developmental changes seen in an individual persons' performance of complex tasks. For example, a person cannot perform arithmetic until the numeral representations of numbers are learned, or a person cannot operationally multiply the sums of numbers until addition is learned. However, as much as natural intelligence helps humans to understand some numbers, it does not play a complete role in multiplying large numbers without learning addition.

The creators of the MHC claim that previous theories of stage have confounded the stimulus and response in assessing stage by simply scoring responses and ignoring the task or stimulus. The MHC separates the task or stimulus from the performance. The participant's performance on a task of a given complexity represents the stage of developmental complexity.

Previous stage theories were unsatisfying to Commons and Richards because the theories did not show the existence of the stages beyond describing sequential changes in human behavior. This led them to create a list of two concepts they felt a successful developmental theory should address. The two ideas they wanted to study were (1) the hierarchical complexity of the task to be solved and (2) the psychology, sociology, and anthropology of the task performance (and the development of the performance).

== Vertical complexity of tasks performed ==
One major basis for this developmental theory is task analysis. The study of ideal tasks, including their instantiation in the real world, has been the basis of the branch of stimulus control called psychophysics. Tasks are defined as sequences of contingencies, each presenting stimuli and each requiring a behavior or a sequence of behaviors that must occur in some non-arbitrary fashion. The complexity of behaviors necessary to complete a task can be specified using the horizontal complexity and vertical complexity definitions described below. Behavior is examined with respect to the analytically known complexity of the task.

Tasks are quantal in nature. They are either completed correctly or not completed at all. There is no intermediate state (tertium non datur). For this reason, the model characterizes all stages as P-hard and functionally distinct. The orders of hierarchical complexity are quantized like the electron atomic orbitals around the nucleus: each task difficulty has an order of hierarchical complexity required to complete it correctly, analogous to the atomic Slater determinant. Since tasks of a given quantified order of hierarchical complexity require actions of a given order of hierarchical complexity to perform them, the stage of the participant's task performance is equivalent to the order of complexity of the successfully completed task. The quantal feature of tasks is thus particularly instrumental in stage assessment because the scores obtained for stages are likewise discrete.

Every task contains a multitude of subtasks. When the subtasks are carried out by the participant in a required order, the task in question is successfully completed. Therefore, the model asserts that all tasks fit in some configured sequence of tasks, making it possible to precisely determine the hierarchical order of task complexity. Tasks vary in complexity in two ways: either as horizontal (involving classical information); or as vertical (involving hierarchical information).

=== Horizontal complexity ===
Classical information describes the number of "yes–no" questions it takes to do a task. For example, if one asked a person across the room whether a penny came up heads when they flipped it, their saying "heads" would transmit 1 bit of "horizontal" information. If there were 2 pennies, one would have to ask at least two questions, one about each penny. Hence, each additional 1-bit question would add another bit. Let us say they had a four-faced top with the faces numbered 1, 2, 3, and 4. Instead of spinning it, they tossed it against a backboard as one does with dice in a game of craps. Again, there would be 2 bits. One could ask them whether the face had an even number. If it did, one would then ask if it were a 2. Horizontal complexity, then, is the sum of bits required by just such tasks as these.

=== Vertical complexity ===
Hierarchical complexity refers to the number of recursions that the coordinating actions must perform on a set of primary elements. Actions at a higher order of hierarchical complexity: (a) are defined in terms of actions at the next lower order of hierarchical complexity; (b) organize and transform the lower-order actions (see Figure 2); (c) produce organizations of lower-order actions that are qualitatively new and not arbitrary, and cannot be accomplished by those lower-order actions alone. Once these conditions have been met, we say the higher-order action coordinates the actions of the next lower order.

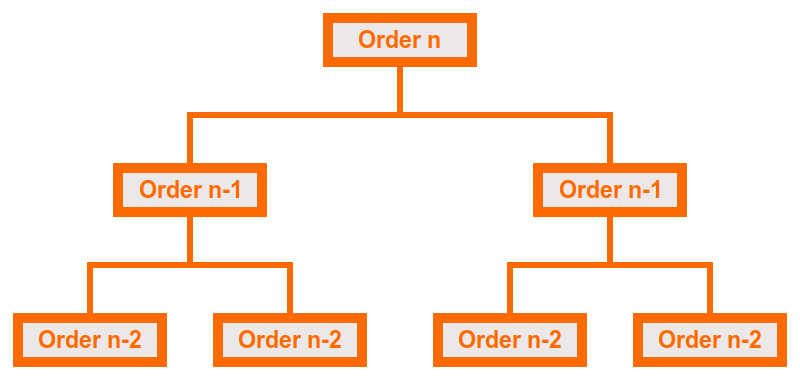
The hierarchical structure of MHC. A task of order n is composed of 2 or more tasks of order n-1, which in turn are composed of 2 or more tasks of order n-2, etc.

To illustrate how lower actions get organized into more hierarchically complex actions, let us turn to a simple example. Completing the entire operation 3 × (4 + 1) constitutes a task requiring the distributive act. That act non-arbitrarily orders adding and multiplying to coordinate them. The distributive act is therefore one order more hierarchically complex than the acts of adding and multiplying alone; it indicates the singular proper sequence of the simpler actions. Although simply adding results in the same answer, people who can do both display a greater freedom of mental functioning. Additional layers of abstraction can be applied. Thus, the order of complexity of the task is determined through analyzing the demands of each task by breaking it down into its constituent parts.

The hierarchical complexity of a task refers to the number of concatenation operations it contains, that is, the number of recursions that the coordinating actions must perform. An order-three task has three concatenation operations. A task of order three operates on one or more tasks of vertical order two, and a task of order two operates on one or more tasks of vertical order one (the simplest tasks).

== Stages of development ==
Stage theories describe human organismic and/or technological evolution as systems that move through a pattern of distinct stages over time. Here development is described formally in terms of the model of hierarchical complexity (MHC).

=== Formal definition of stage ===
Since actions are defined inductively, so is the function h, known as the order of the hierarchical complexity. To each action A, we wish to associate a notion of that action's hierarchical complexity, h(A). Given a collection of actions A and a participant S performing A, the stage of performance of S on A is the highest order of the actions in A completed successfully at least once, i.e., it is: stage (S, A) = max{h(A) | A ∈ A and A completed successfully by S}. Thus, the notion of stage is discontinuous, having the same transitional gaps as the orders of hierarchical complexity. This is in accordance with previous definitions.

Because MHC stages are conceptualized in terms of the hierarchical complexity of tasks rather than in terms of mental representations (as in Piaget's stages), the highest stage represents successful performances on the most hierarchically complex tasks rather than intellectual maturity.

=== Stages of hierarchical complexity ===
The following table gives descriptions of each stage in the MHC.

Stages described in the model of hierarchical complexity (adapted from Commons, Crone-Todd, & Chen, 2014)
Order or stage	What they do	How they do it	End result
0 – calculatory	Exact computation only, no generalization	Human-made programs manipulate 0, 1, not 2 or 3.	Minimal human result. Unorganized machines (in Turing's sense) act in a way analogous to this stage.
1 – automatic	Engage in a single "hard-wired" action at a time, no respondent conditioning	Respond, as a simple mechanism, to a single environmental stimulus	Single celled organisms respond to a single stimulus in a way analogous to this stage
2 – sensory and motor	Discriminate in a rote fashion, stimuli generalization, move	Move limbs, lips, toes, eyes, elbows, head; view objects or move	Discriminative establishing and reinforcing conditioned stimuli
3 – circular sensory-motor	Form open-ended proper classes	Reach, touch, grab, shake objects, circular babble	Open ended proper classes, phonemes, archiphonemes
4 – sensory-motor	Form concepts	Respond to stimuli in a class successfully and non-stochastically	Morphemes, concepts
5 – nominal	Find relations among concepts	Use names for objects and other utterances as successful commands	Single words: ejaculatives & exclamations, verbs, nouns, number names, letter names
6 – sentential	Imitate and acquire sequences; follow short sequential acts	Generalize match-dependent task actions; chain words	Various forms of pronouns: subject (I), object (me), possessive adjective (my), possessive pronoun (mine), and reflexive (myself) for various persons (I, you, he, she, it, we, y'all, they)
7 – preoperational	Make simple deductions; follow lists of sequential acts; tell stories	Count event roughly events and objects; connect the dots; combine numbers and simple propositions	Connectives: as, when, then, why, before; products of simple operations
8 – primary	Simple logical deduction and empirical rules involving time sequence; simple arithmetic	Adds, subtracts, multiplies, divides, counts, proves, does series of tasks on own	Times, places, counts acts, actors, arithmetic outcome, sequence from calculation
9 – concrete	Carry out full arithmetic, form cliques, plan deals	Does long division, short division, follows complex social rules, ignores simple social rules, takes and coordinates perspective of other and self	Interrelations, social events, what happened among others, reasonable deals, history, geography
10 – abstract	Discriminate variables such as stereotypes; logical quantification; (none, some, all)	Form variables out of finite classes; make and quantify propositions	Variable time, place, act, actor, state, type; quantifiers (all, none, some); categorical assertions (e.g., "We all die")
11 – formal	Argue using empirical or logical evidence; logic is linear, 1-dimensional	Solve problems with one unknown using algebra, logic and empiricism	Relationships (for example: causality) are formed out of variables; words: linear, logical, one-dimensional, if then, thus, therefore, because; correct scientific solutions
12 – systematic	Construct multivariate systems and matrices	Coordinate more than one variable as input; consider relationships in contexts.	Events and concepts situated in a multivariate context; systems are formed out of relations; systems: legal, societal, corporate, economic, national
13 – metasystematic	Construct multi-systems and metasystems out of disparate systems	Create metasystems out of systems; compare systems and perspectives; name properties of systems: e.g. homomorphic, isomorphic, complete, consistent (such as tested by consistency proofs), commensurable	Metasystems and supersystems are formed out of systems of relationships, e.g. contracts and promises
14 – paradigmatic	Fit metasystems together to form new paradigms; show "incomplete" or "inconsistent" aspects of metasystems	Synthesize metasystems	Paradigms are formed out of multiple metasystems
15 – cross-paradigmatic	Fit paradigms together to form new fields	Form new fields by crossing paradigms, e.g. evolutionary biology + developmental biology = evolutionary developmental biology	New fields are formed out of multiple paradigms
16 – meta-cross-paradigmatic (performative-recursive)	Reflect on various properties of cross-paradigmatic operations	Explicate the dynamics of, and limitations of, cross-paradigmatic thinking	The dynamics and limitations of cross-paradigmatic thinking are explained as they are recursively enacted

== Relationship with Piaget's theory ==
The MHC builds on Piagetian theory but differs from it in many ways; notably, the MHC has additional higher stages. In both theories, one finds:

1. Higher-order actions defined in terms of lower-order actions. This forces the hierarchical nature of the relations and makes the higher-order tasks include the lower ones and requires that lower-order actions are hierarchically contained within the relative definitions of the higher-order tasks.
2. Higher-order of complexity actions organize those lower-order actions. This makes them more powerful. Lower-order actions are organized by the actions with a higher order of complexity, i.e., the more complex tasks.

What Commons et al. (1998) have added includes:

3. Higher-order-of-complexity actions organize those lower-order actions in a non-arbitrary way.

This makes it possible for the model's application to meet real world requirements, including the empirical and analytic. Arbitrary organization of lower-order complexity actions, possible in the Piagetian theory, despite the hierarchical definition structure, leaves the functional correlates of the interrelationships of tasks of differential complexity formulations ill-defined.

Moreover, the model is consistent with the neo-Piagetian theories of cognitive development. According to these theories, progression to higher stages or levels of cognitive development is caused by increases in processing efficiency and working memory capacity. That is, higher-order stages place increasingly higher demands on these functions of information processing, so that their order of appearance reflects the information processing possibilities at successive ages.

The following dimensions are inherent in the application:

1. Task and performance are separated.
2. All tasks have an order of hierarchical complexity.
3. There is only one sequence of orders of hierarchical complexity.
4. Hence, there is structure of the whole for ideal tasks and actions.
5. There are transitional gaps between the orders of hierarchical complexity.
6. Stage is defined as the most hierarchically complex task solved.
7. There are discrete gaps in Rasch scaled stage of performance.
8. Performance stage is different task area to task area.
9. There is no structure of the whole—horizontal décalage—for performance. It is not inconsistency in thinking within a developmental stage. Décalage is the normal modal state of affairs.

== Orders and corresponding stages ==
The MHC specifies 16 orders of hierarchical complexity and their corresponding stages, positing that each of Piaget's substages, in fact, are robustly hard stages. The MHC adds five postformal stages to Piaget's developmental trajectory: systematic stage 12, metasystematic stage 13, paradigmatic stage 14, cross-paradigmatic stage 15, and meta-cross-paradigmatic stage 16. It may be the Piaget's consolidate formal stage is the same as the systematic stage. The sequence is as follows: (0) calculatory, (1) automatic, (2) sensory & motor, (3) circular sensory-motor, (4) sensory-motor, (5) nominal, (6) sentential, (7) preoperational, (8) primary, (9) concrete, (10) abstract, (11) formal, and the five postformal: (12) systematic, (13) metasystematic, (14) paradigmatic, (15) cross-paradigmatic, and (16) meta-cross-paradigmatic. The first five stages (0–4) correspond to Piaget's sensorimotor stage at which infants and very young children perform. Adolescents and adults can perform at any of the subsequent stages. MHC stages 5 through 6 correspond to Piaget's pre-operational stage; 7 through 9 correspond to his concrete operational stage; and 10 through 12 correspond to his formal operational stage.

More complex behaviors characterize multiple system models. The four highest stages in the MHC are not represented in Piaget's model. The higher stages of the MHC have extensively influenced the field of positive adult development. Some adults are said to develop alternatives to, and perspectives on, formal operations; they use formal operations within a "higher" system of operations. Some theorists call the more complex orders of cognitive tasks "postformal thought", but other theorists argue that these higher orders cannot exactly be labelled as postformal thought.

Jordan (2018) argued that unidimensional models such as the MHC, which measure level of complexity of some behavior, refer to only one of many aspects of adult development, and that other variables are needed (in addition to unidimensional measures of complexity) for a fuller description of adult development.

== Empirical research using the model ==
The MHC has a broad range of applicability. Its mathematical foundation permits it to be used by anyone examining task performance that is organized into stages. It is designed to assess development based on the order of complexity which the actor utilizes to organize information. The model thus allows for a standard quantitative analysis of developmental complexity in any cultural setting. Other advantages of this model include its avoidance of mentalistic explanations, as well as its use of quantitative principles which are universally applicable in any context.

The following practitioners can use the MHC to quantitatively assess developmental stages:

- Cross-cultural developmentalists
- Animal developmentalists
- Evolutionary psychologists
- Organizational psychologists
- Developmental political psychologists
- Learning theorists
- Perception researchers
- Historians of science
- Educators
- Therapists
- Anthropologists

=== List of examples ===
In one representative study, Commons, Goodheart, and Dawson (1997) found, using Rasch analysis (Rasch, 1980), that hierarchical complexity of a given task predicts stage of a performance, the correlation being r = 0.92. Correlations of similar magnitude have been found in a number of the studies. The following are examples of tasks studied using the model of hierarchical complexity or Kurt W. Fischer's similar skill theory:

- Algebra (Commons, Giri, & Harrigan, 2014)
- Animal stages (Commons & Miller, 2004)
- Atheism (Commons-Miller, 2005)
- Attachment and loss (Commons, 1991; Miller & Lee, 2000)
- Balance beam and pendulum (Commons, Goodheart, & Bresette, 1995; Commons, Giri, & Harrigan, 2014)
- Contingencies of reinforcement (Commons & Giri, 2016)
- Counselor stages (Lovell, 2002)
- Empathy of hominids (Commons & Wolfsont, 2002)
- Epistemology (Kitchener & Fischer, 1990; Kitchener & King, 1990)
- Evaluative reasoning (Dawson, 2000)
- Four story problem (Commons, Richards & Kuhn, 1982; Kallio & Helkama, 1991)
- Good education (Dawson-Tunik, 2004)
- Good interpersonal relations (Armon, 1984a; Armon, 1984b; Armon, 1989)
- Good work (Armon, 1993)
- Honesty and kindness (Lamborn, Fischer & Pipp, 1994)
- Informed consent (Commons & Rodriguez, 1990; Commons & Rodriguez, 1993; Commons, Goodheart, Rodriguez, & Gutheil, 2006)
- Language stages (Commons et al., 2007)
- Leadership before and after crises (Oliver, 2004)
- Loevinger's sentence completion task (Cook-Greuter, 1990)
- Moral judgment (Armon & Dawson, 1997; Dawson, 2000)
- Music (Beethoven) (Funk, 1989)
- Physics tasks (Inhelder & Piaget, 1958)
- Political development (Sonnert & Commons, 1994)
- Report patient's prior crimes (Commons, Lee, Gutheil, et al., 1995)
- Social perspective-taking (Commons & Rodriguez, 1990; Commons & Rodriguez, 1993)
- Spirituality (Miller & Cook-Greuter, 1994)
- Tool making of hominids (Commons & Miller 2002)
- Views of the good life (Armon, 1984b; Danaher, 1993; Dawson, 2000; Lam, 1995)
- Workplace culture (Commons, Krause, Fayer, & Meaney, 1993)
- Workplace organization (Bowman, 1996)

As of 2014, people and institutes from all the major continents of the world, except Africa, have used the model of hierarchical complexity. Because the model is very simple and is based on analysis of tasks and not just performances, it is dynamic. With the help of the model, it is possible to quantify the occurrence and progression of transition processes in task performances at any order of hierarchical complexity.

== Criticisms ==
The descriptions of stages 13–15 have been described as insufficiently precise.

== See also ==
- Behavior analysis of child development
- Bloom's taxonomy – Classification system in education
- Coherence therapy § Hierarchical organization of constructs
- Constructive developmental framework – Concept in developmental psychology
- Developmental systems theory – Evolutionary and developmental biology theory
- DIKW pyramid – Data, information, knowledge, wisdom hierarchy
- Double-loop learning – Learning model
- Educational assessment – Educational evaluation method
- Elementary cognitive task – Simplest tasks used in intelligence testing
- Higher-order thinking – Concept in education and education reform
- In Over Our Heads – Book on psychological development by Robert Kegan
- Instructional scaffolding – Support given to a student by an instructor
- Integrative complexity – Research psychometric
- Integrative level – Set of phenomena emerging from pre-existing phenomena
- Lawrence Kohlberg's stages of moral development – Psychological theory describing the evolution of moral reasoning
- Metasystem transition – Emergence of a higher level of organization or control through evolution
- Rubric (academic) – Scoring guide for assessment
- Second-order cybernetics – Application of cybernetics to itself
- Structure of observed learning outcome – Model of levels of increasing complexity in understanding

== Literature ==
- Armon, C. (1984a). Ideals of the good life and moral judgment: Ethical reasoning across the life span. In M.L. Commons, F.A. Richards, & C. Armon (Eds.), Beyond formal operations: Vol. 1. Late adolescent and adult cognitive development (pp. 357–380). New York: Praeger.
- Armon, C. (1984b). Ideals of the good life and moral judgment: Evaluative reasoning in children and adults. Moral Education Forum, 9(2).
- Armon, C. (1989). Individuality and autonomy in adult ethical reasoning. In M.L. Commons, J.D. Sinnott, F.A. Richards, & C. Armon (Eds.), Adult development, Vol. 1. Comparisons and applications of adolescent and adult developmental models, (pp. 179–196). New York: Praeger.
- Armon, C. (1993). The nature of good work: A longitudinal study. In J. Demick & P.M. Miller (Eds.), Development in the workplace (pp. 21–38). Hillsdale, NJ: Erlbaum.
- Armon, C. & Dawson, T.L. (1997). Developmental trajectories in moral reasoning across the life-span. Journal of Moral Education, 26, 433–453.
- Biggs, J.B. & Collis, K. (1982). Evaluating the quality of learning: The SOLO taxonomy (structure of the observed learning outcome). New York: Academic Press.
- Bowman, A.K. (1996). Examples of task and relationship 4b, 5a, 5b statements for task performance, atmosphere, and preferred atmosphere. In M.L. Commons, E.A. Goodheart, T.L. Dawson, P.M. Miller, & D.L. Danaher, (Eds.) The general stage scoring system (GSSS). Presented at the Society for Research in Adult Development, Amherst, MA.
- Commons, M.L. (1991). A comparison and synthesis of Kohlberg's cognitive-developmental and Gewirtz's learning-developmental attachment theories. In J.L. Gewirtz & W.M. Kurtines (Eds.), Intersections with attachment (pp. 257–291). Hillsdale, NJ: Erlbaum.
- Commons, M.L. (2007). Introduction to the model of hierarchical complexity. Behavioral Development Bulletin, 13(1), 1–6.
- Commons, M.L., & Chen, S.J. (2014). Advances in the model of hierarchical complexity (MHC). Behavioral Development Bulletin, 19(4), 37–50.
- Commons, M.L., Crone-Todd, D., & Chen, S.J. (2014). Using SAFMEDS and direct instruction to teach the model of hierarchical complexity. The Behavior Analyst Today, 14(1-2), 31–45.
- Commons, M.L., Gane-McCalla, R., Barker, C.D., & Li, E.Y. (2014). The model of hierarchical complexity as a measurement system. Behavioral Development Bulletin, 19(3), 9–14.
- Commons, M.L., & Giri, S. (2016). Account of operant conditioning based on coordinating three procedural steps of respondent conditioning processes. Behavioral Development Bulletin, 21(1), 14–32.
- Commons, M.L., Giri, S., & Harrigan, W.J. (2014). The small effects of non-hierarchical complexity variables on performance. Behavioral Development Bulletin, 19(4), 31–36.
- Commons, M.L., Goodheart, E.A., & Bresette, L.M. with Bauer, N.F., Farrell, E.W., McCarthy, K.G., Danaher, D.L., Richards, F.A., Ellis, J.B., O'Brien, A.M., Rodriguez, J.A., and Schraeder, D. (1995). Formal, systematic, and metasystematic operations with a balance-beam task series: A reply to Kallio's claim of no distinct systematic stage. Adult Development, 2 (3), 193–199.
- Commons, M.L., Goodheart, E.A., & Dawson T.L. (1997). Psychophysics of stage: Task complexity and statistical models. Paper presented at the International Objective Measurement Workshop at the Annual Conference of the American Educational Research Association, Chicago, IL.
- Commons, M.L., Goodheart, E.A., Pekker, A., Dawson, T.L., Draney, K., & Adams, K.M. (2007). Using Rasch scaled stage scores to validate orders of hierarchical complexity of balance beam task sequences. In E.V. Smith, Jr. & R.M. Smith (Eds.). Rasch measurement: Advanced and specialized applications (pp. 121–147). Maple Grove, MN: JAM Press.
- Commons, M.L., Goodheart, E.A., Rodriguez, J.A., Gutheil, T.G. (2006). Informed Consent: Do you know it when you see it? Psychiatric Annals, June, 430–435.
- Commons, M.L., Krause, S.R., Fayer, G.A., & Meaney, M. (1993). Atmosphere and stage development in the workplace. In J. Demick & P.M. Miller (Eds.). Development in the workplace (pp. 199–220). Hillsdale, NJ: Lawrence Erlbaum Associates, Inc.
- Commons, M.L., Lee, P., Gutheil, T.G., Goldman, M., Rubin, E. & Appelbaum, P.S. (1995). Moral stage of reasoning and the misperceived "duty" to report past crimes (misprision). International Journal of Law and Psychiatry, 18(4), 415–424.
- Commons, M.L., & Miller, P.A. (2001). A quantitative behavioral model of developmental stage based upon hierarchical complexity theory. Behavior Analyst Today, 2(3), 222–240.
- Commons, M.L., Miller, P.M. (2002). A complete theory of human evolution of intelligence must consider stage changes: A commentary on Thomas Wynn's Archeology and cognitive evolution. Behavioral and Brain Sciences, 25(3), 404–405.
- Commons, M.L., & Miller, P.M. (2004). Development of behavioral stages in animals. In Marc Bekoff (Ed.). Encyclopedia of animal behavior. (pp. 484–487). Westport, CT: Greenwood Publishing Group.
- Commons, M.L., & Pekker, A. (2008). Presenting the formal theory of hierarchical complexity. World Futures, 64(5-7), 375–382.
- Commons, M.L., & Richards, F.A. (1984a). A general model of stage theory. In M.L. Commons, F.A. Richards, & C. Armon (Eds.), Beyond formal operations: Vol. 1. Late adolescent and adult cognitive development (pp. 120–140). New York: Praeger.
- Commons, M.L., & Richards, F.A. (1984b). Applying the general stage model. In M.L. Commons, F.A. Richards, & C. Armon (Eds.), Beyond formal operations: Vol. 1. Late adolescent and adult cognitive development (pp. 141–157). New York: Praeger.
- Commons, M.L., Richards, F.A., & Kuhn, D. (1982). Systematic and metasystematic reasoning: A case for a level of reasoning beyond Piaget's formal operations. Child Development, 53, 1058–1069.
- Commons, M.L., Rodriguez, J.A. (1990). "Equal access" without "establishing" religion: The necessity for assessing social perspective-taking skills and institutional atmosphere. Developmental Review, 10, 323–340.
- Commons, M.L., Rodriguez, J.A. (1993). The development of hierarchically complex equivalence classes. Psychological Record, 43, 667–697.
- Commons, M.L., Trudeau, E.J., Stein, S.A., Richards, F.A., & Krause, S.R. (1998). Hierarchical complexity of tasks shows the existence of developmental stages. Developmental Review, 8(3), 237–278.
- Commons, M.L., & Wolfsont, C.A. (2002). A complete theory of empathy must consider stage changes. Behavioral and Brain Sciences, 25(01), 30–31.
- Commons-Miller, N.H.K. (2005). The stages of atheism. Paper presented at the Society for Research in Adult Development, Atlanta, GA.
- Cook-Greuter, S.R. (1990). Maps for living: Ego-development theory from symbiosis to conscious universal embeddedness. In M.L. Commons, J.D. Sinnott, F.A. Richards, & C. Armon (Eds.). Adult Development: Vol. 2, Comparisons and applications of adolescent and adult developmental models (pp. 79–104). New York: Praeger.
- Coombs, C.H., Dawes, R.M., & Tversky, A. (1970). Mathematical psychology: An elementary introduction. Englewood Cliffs, New Jersey: Prentice-Hall.
- Danaher, D. (1993). Sex role differences in ego and moral development: Mitigation with maturity. Doctoral dissertation, Harvard Graduate School of Education.
- Dawson, T.L. (2000). Moral and evaluative reasoning across the life-span. Journal of Applied Measurement, 1(4), 346–371.
- Dawson-Tunik, T.L. (2004). "A good education is": The development of evaluative thought across the life span. Genetic, Social, and General Psychology Monographs, 130, 4–112.
- Demetriou, A. (1998). Cognitive development. In A. Demetriou, W. Doise, K.F.M. van Lieshout (Eds.), Life-span developmental psychology (pp. 179–269). London: Wiley.
- Fischer, K.W. (1980). A theory of cognitive development: The control and construction of hierarchies of skills. Psychological Review, 87(6), 477–531.
- Funk, J.D. (1989). Postformal cognitive theory and developmental stages of musical composition. In M.L. Commons, J.D. Sinnott, F.A. Richards & C. Armon (Eds.), Adult Development: (Vol. 1) Comparisons and applications of developmental models (pp. 3–30). Westport, CT: Praeger.
- Giri, S., Commons, M.L., & Harrigan, W.J. (2014). There is only one stage domain. Behavioral Development Bulletin, 19(4), 51.
- Inhelder, B., & Piaget, J. (1958). The growth of logical thinking from childhood to adolescence: An essay on the development of formal operational structures. (A. Parsons, & S. Seagrim, Trans.). New York: Basic Books (originally published 1955).
- Jordan, T. (2018). Late stages of adult development: one linear sequence or several parallel branches? Integral Review, 14(1), 288–299.
- Kallio, E. (1995). Systematic reasoning: Formal or postformal cognition? Journal of Adult Development, 2, 187–192.
- Kallio, E. (2011). Integrative thinking is the key: an evaluation of current research into the development of adult thinking. Theory & Psychology, 21(6), 785–801.
- Kallio, E., & Helkama, K. (1991). Formal operations and postformal reasoning: A replication. Scandinavian Journal of Psychology. 32(1), 18–21.
- Kitchener, K.S., & King, P.M. (1990). Reflective judgement: Ten years of research. In M.L. Commons, C. Armon, L. Kohlberg, F.A. Richards, T.A. Grotzer, & J.D. Sinnott (Eds.), Beyond formal operations: Vol. 2. Models and methods in the study of adolescent and adult thought (pp. 63–78). New York: Praeger.
- Kitchener, K.S. & Fischer, K.W. (1990). A skill approach to the development of reflective thinking. In D. Kuhn (Ed.), Developmental perspectives on teaching and learning thinking skills. Contributions to Human Development: Vol. 21 (pp. 48–62).
- Lam, M.S. (1995). Women and men scientists' notions of the good life: A developmental approach. Doctoral dissertation, University of Massachusetts, Amherst, MA.
- Lamborn, S., Fischer, K.W., & Pipp, S.L. (1994). Constructive criticism and social lies: A developmental sequence for understanding honesty and kindness in social relationships. Developmental Psychology, 30, 495–508.
- Lindsay, P.H., & Norman, D.A. (1977). Human information processing: An introduction to psychology, (2nd Edition), New York: Academic Press.
- Lovell, C.W. (2002). Development and disequilibration: Predicting counselor trainee gain and loss scores on the Supervisee Levels Questionnaire. Journal of Adult Development, 9(3), 235–240.
- Mascolo, M.F. (2008). The concept of domain in developmental analyses of hierarchical complexity. World Futures, 64(5-7), 330–347.
- Miller, M. & Cook-Greuter, S. (Eds.). (1994). Transcendence and mature thought in adulthood. Lanham: MN: Rowman & Littlefield.
- Miller, P.M., & Lee, S.T. (June, 2000). Stages and transitions in child and adult narratives about losses of attachment objects. Paper presented at the Jean Piaget Society. Montreal, Québec, Canada.
- Oliver, C.R. (2004). Impact of catastrophe on pivotal national leaders' vision statements: Correspondences and discrepancies in moral reasoning, explanatory style, and rumination. Doctoral dissertation, Fielding Graduate Institute.
- Overton, W.F. (1990). Reasoning, necessity, and logic: Developmental perspectives. Hillsdale, NJ: Lawrence Erlbaum Associates.
- Rasch, G. (1980). Probabilistic model for some intelligence and attainment tests. Chicago: University of Chicago Press.
- Robinson, O.C. (2013). The model of hierarchical complexity. In Development through adulthood: an integrative sourcebook (pp. 56–60). Houndmills, UK; New York: Palgrave Macmillan.
- Ross, S.N. (2014). Fractal model of nonlinear hierarchical complexity: Measuring transition dynamics as fractals of themselves. Behavioral Development Bulletin, 19(3), 28–32.
- Ross, S.N., Commons, M.L., Li, E. Y., Stålne, K., & Barker, C.D. (2014). Toward defining order 16 and describing its performance for the model of hierarchical complexity. Behavioral Development Bulletin, 19(3), 33–36.
- Sonnert, G., & Commons, M.L. (1994). Society and the highest stages of moral development. Politics and the Individual, 4(1), 31–55.
- Young, G. (2011). Postformal thought: Commons' model. In Development and causality: neo-Piagetian perspectives (pp. 413–437). New York: Springer Verlag.
