= DFE =

DFE or DfE may refer to:

== Organizations ==
- Department for the Economy, Northern Ireland
- Department for Education, UK
- DePatie–Freleng Enterprises, a defunct American animation studio

== Science ==
- Difluoroescaline, a psychedelic drug
- Dilated fundus examination of the eye
- Distribution of fitness effects
- Dietary folate equivalent, bioavailability of folate
- 1,1-Difluoroethane

== Technology ==
- Design-focused evaluation of educational quality
- Design for the Environment of a product or service
- DFE Ascender, an ultralight aircraft

== Other ==
- Dragon Fli Empire, a Canadian hip hop group
- Dunfermline Town railway station, Scotland, National Rail station code
- The Duke of Edinburgh's Award, commonly referred to as 'DofE'
