= Bloom's taxonomy =

Classification system in education

Bloom's taxonomy is a framework for categorizing educational goals, developed by a committee of educators chaired by Benjamin Bloom in 1956. It was first introduced in the publication Taxonomy of Educational Objectives: The Classification of Educational Goals. The taxonomy divides learning objectives into three broad domains: cognitive (knowledge-based), affective (emotion-based), and psychomotor (action-based), each with a hierarchy of skills and abilities. These domains are used by educators to structure curricula, assessments, and teaching methods to foster different types of learning.

The cognitive domain, the most widely recognized component of the taxonomy, was originally divided into six levels: Knowledge, Comprehension, Application, Analysis, Synthesis, and Evaluation. In 2001, this taxonomy was revised, renaming and reordering the levels as Remember, Understand, Apply, Analyze, Evaluate, and Create. This domain focuses on intellectual skills and the development of critical thinking and problem-solving abilities.

The affective domain addresses attitudes, emotions, and feelings, moving from basic awareness and responsiveness to more complex values and beliefs. This domain outlines five levels: Receiving, Responding, Valuing, Organizing, and Characterizing.

The psychomotor domain, less elaborated by Bloom's original team, pertains to physical skills and the use of motor functions. Subsequent educators, such as Elizabeth Simpson, further developed this domain, outlining levels of skill acquisition from simple perceptions to the origination of new movements.

Bloom's taxonomy has become a widely adopted tool in education, influencing instructional design, assessment strategies, and learning outcomes across various disciplines. Despite its broad application, the taxonomy has also faced criticism, particularly regarding the hierarchical structure of cognitive skills and its implications for teaching and assessment practices.

== History ==
The publication of Taxonomy of Educational Objectives followed a series of conferences from 1949 to 1953, which were designed to improve communication between educators on the design of curricula and examinations. The models were named after Benjamin Bloom, who chaired the committee of educators that devised the taxonomy. He also edited the first volume of the standard text, Taxonomy of Educational Objectives: The Classification of Educational Goals.

The first volume of the taxonomy, Handbook I: Cognitive was published in 1956, and in 1964 the second volume Handbook II: Affective was published. A revised version of the taxonomy for the cognitive domain was created in 2001.

== Domains ==
=== Cognitive (knowledge-based) ===
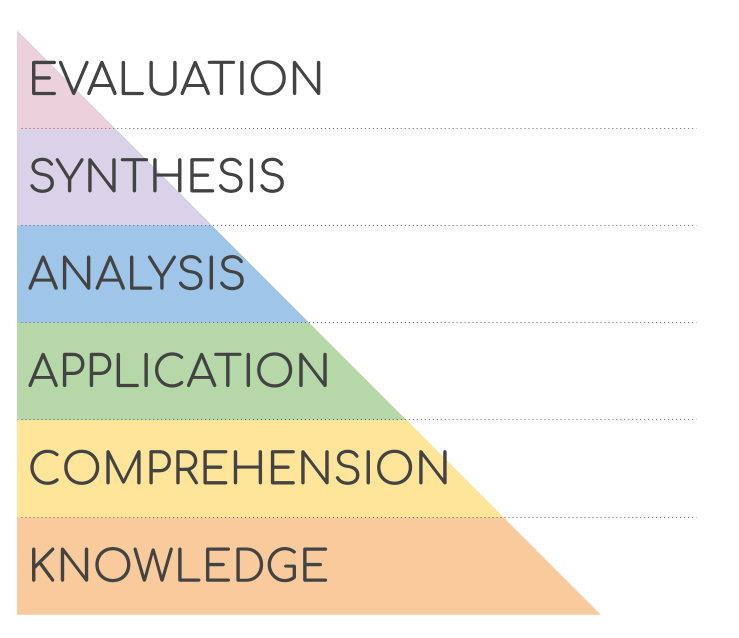
Bloom's taxonomy, prior to 2001

In the 1956 original version of the taxonomy, the cognitive domain is divided into six levels of objectives. In the 2001 revised edition of Bloom's taxonomy, the levels were renamed, and the top two reordered: Remember, Understand, Apply, Analyze, Evaluate, and Create.

- Knowledge: Recognizing or recalling facts, terms, basic concepts, or answers without necessarily understanding their meaning.
- Comprehension: Demonstrating an understanding of facts and ideas by organizing and summarizing information.
- Application: Using acquired knowledge to solve problems in new or unfamiliar situations.
- Analysis: Breaking down information into parts to understand relationships, motives, or causes.
- Synthesis: Building a new whole by combining elements or creating new meaning.
- Evaluation: Making judgments about information, based on set criteria or standards.

=== Affective (emotion-based) ===
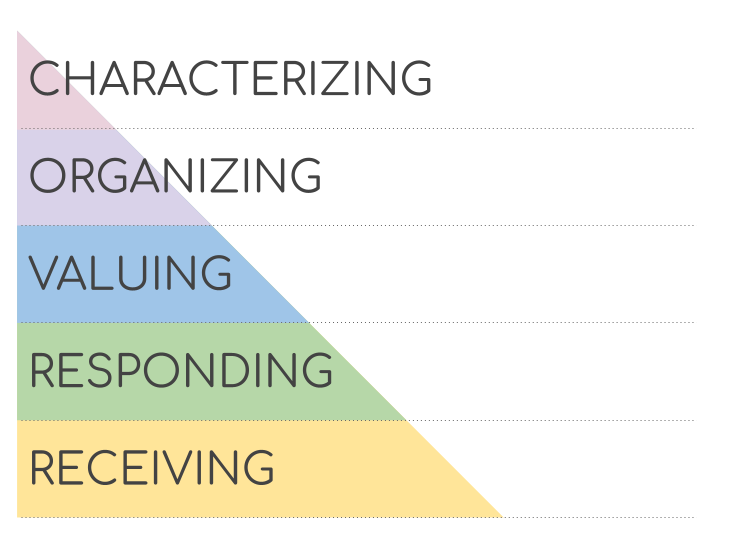
A scaffolding hierarchy of the affective domain related to learning

Skills in the affective domain describe the way people react emotionally and their ability to feel other living things' pain or joy. Affective objectives typically target the awareness and growth in attitudes, emotion, and feelings.

There are five levels in the affective domain, moving through the lowest-order processes to the highest:

- Receiving: The lowest level; the student passively pays attention. Without this level, no learning can occur. Receiving is about the student's memory and recognition as well.
- Responding: The student actively participates in the learning process. Not only attends to a stimulus, but the student also reacts in some way.
- Valuing: The student attaches a value to an object, phenomenon, or piece of information. The student associates a value or some values to the knowledge they acquired.
- Organizing: The student can put together different values, information, and ideas and accommodate them within their own schema. The student is comparing, relating, and elaborating on what has been learned.
- Characterizing: At this level, the student tries to build abstract knowledge.

=== Psychomotor (action-based) ===
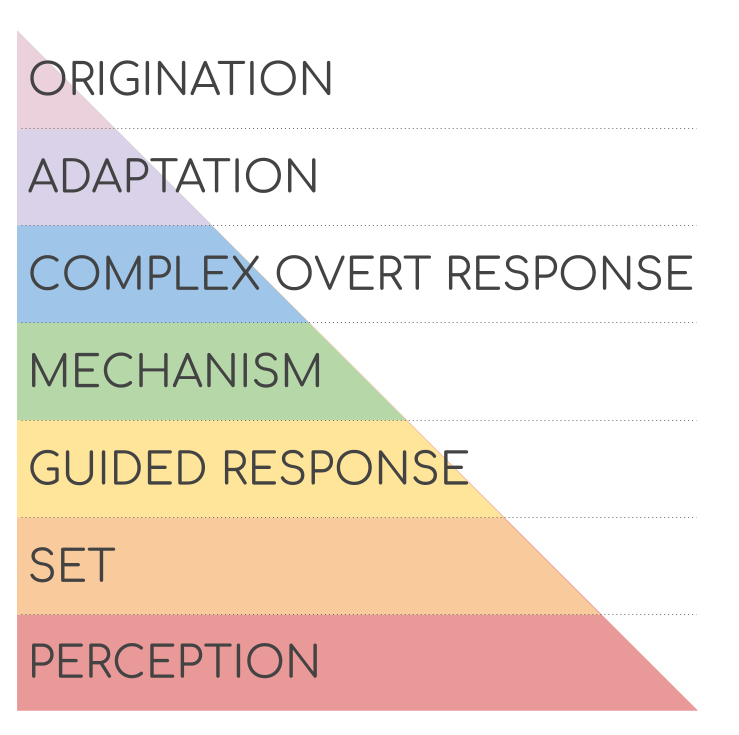
A scaffolding hierarchy of the psychomotor domain related to learning

Skills in the psychomotor domain describe the ability to physically manipulate tools or instruments, such as using a hand or a hammer. Objectives in this domain often focus on the development and change of physical skills or behavior.

Although Bloom and his colleagues did not create subcategories for the psychomotor domain, later educators, such as Elizabeth Simpson, proposed a taxonomy for psychomotor skills. Simpson’s taxonomy, introduced in 1972, categorizes psychomotor learning into seven levels, each describing progressively complex physical skills and behaviors. These levels include:

- Perception: Using sensory cues to guide motor activity (e.g., detecting non-verbal communication or adjusting tools based on sensory feedback).
- Set: Readiness to act, including mental, physical, and emotional preparedness.
- Guided response: The early stages of skill acquisition, involving imitation and trial and error.
- Mechanism: Intermediate skill proficiency, where movements become habitual.
- Complex overt response: The skillful and accurate performance of complex tasks.
- Adaptation: The ability to modify movements to fit specific circumstances.
- Origination: Creating new movement patterns to address novel problems or situations.

This taxonomy helps educators frame psychomotor objectives in contexts such as vocational training, sports, and performing arts, where physical dexterity is central to learning outcomes.

== Significance ==
=== Theory of knowledge ===
In the appendix to Handbook I, knowledge is defined as involving the recall of specifics, methods, and structures. This definition is a cornerstone of the taxonomy of educational goals, widely applied beyond education, notably in knowledge management. Knowledge is categorized into specific domains: the recall of terminology and facts, understanding methods and conventions, and recognizing patterns and principles in various fields. This framework highlights the complexity of knowledge, spanning from concrete specifics to abstract theories.

=== Criticism of the taxonomy ===
Richard W. Morshead criticized the original taxonomy, noting that it was not a properly constructed taxonomy as it lacked a systematic rationale of construction. This was later acknowledged in the 2001 revision, where the taxonomy was restructured on more systematic lines.

Some critiques of the taxonomy's cognitive domain accept the six categories but question the existence of a sequential, hierarchical link. Often, educators may see the taxonomy as a hierarchy and mistakenly dismiss the lower levels as less important for teaching. In response, others have argued that the learning of lower levels supports the development of skills at higher levels, and in certain fields, the most critical skills may reside in the lower levels, such as species identification in natural history. Instructional scaffolding from lower-level to higher-level skills is an application of Vygotskian constructivism.

While some consider the three lower levels hierarchically ordered and the three higher levels parallel, others argue that it can be beneficial to move to application before introducing concepts, particularly in problem-based learning environments where real-world contexts precede theoretical understanding.

The distinction between categories can be seen as artificial, since cognitive tasks often involve multiple processes. Categorizing mental processes into distinct classifications may undermine the interconnected nature of cognition, a critique commonly directed at taxonomies of mental processes. Despite this, the taxonomy is widely used in educational settings to structure learning outcomes, though a 2020 study revealed inconsistencies between institutions in the mapping of action verbs to the taxonomy's levels.

=== Implications ===
Bloom's taxonomy serves as the backbone of many teaching philosophies, in particular, those that lean more towards skills rather than content. These educators view content as a vessel for teaching skills. The emphasis on higher-order thinking inherent in such philosophies is based on the top levels of the taxonomy including application, analysis, synthesis, and evaluation. Bloom's taxonomy can be used as a teaching tool to help balance evaluative and assessment-based questions in assignments, texts, and class engagements to ensure that all orders of thinking are exercised in students' learning, including aspects of information searching.

=== Connections between disciplines ===
Bloom's taxonomy is a source of inspiration for educational philosophy and for developing new teaching strategies, particularly in light of trends in developing global focus on multiple literacies and modalities in learning and the emerging field of integrated disciplines. For example, ability to interface with and create media draws upon skills from both higher and lower-order thinking skills.

== Gallery ==
Bloom's taxonomy organized radially

Bloom's revised taxonomy organized as a pyramid of learning levels with explanations of each

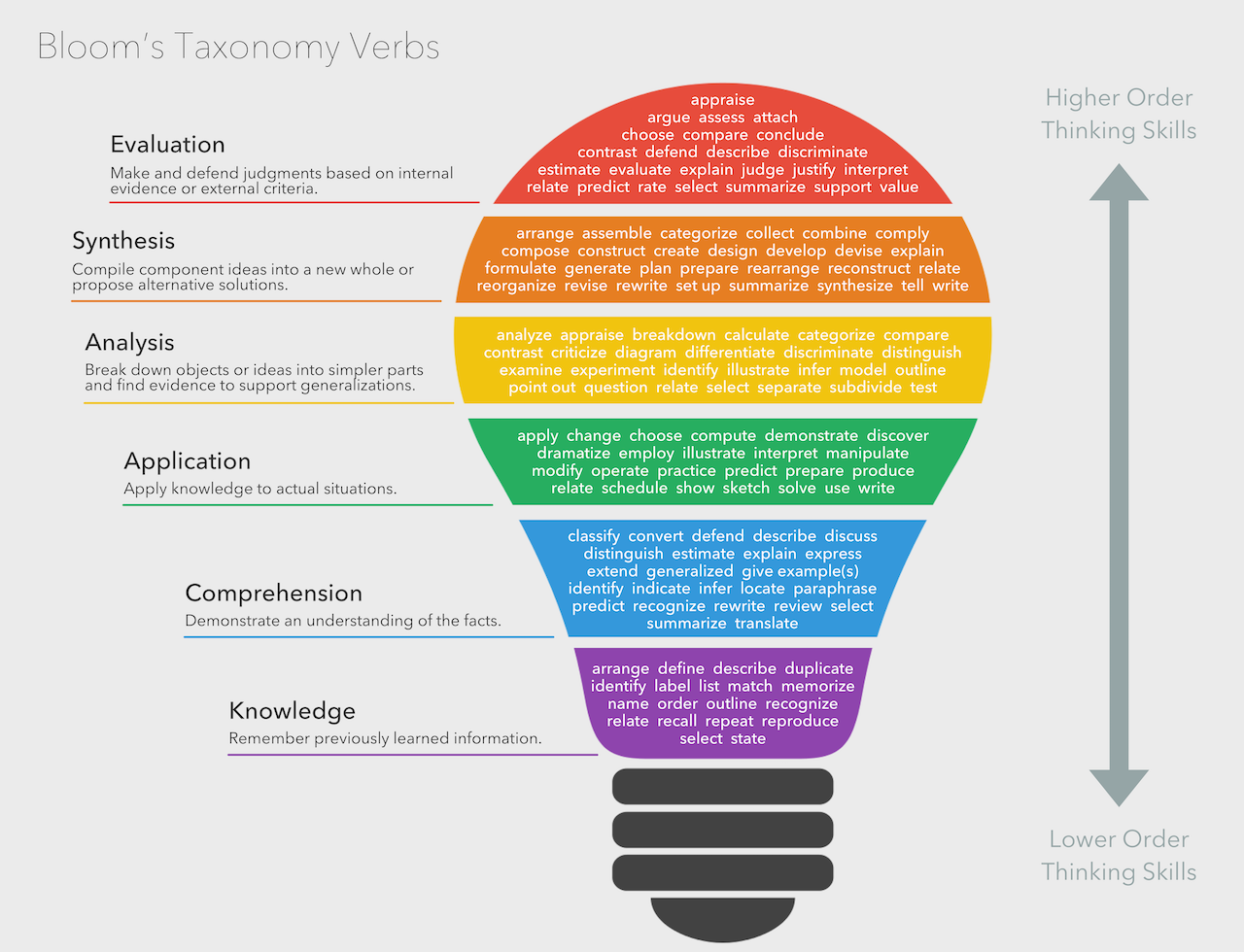
Bloom's taxonomy verbs portrayed as a light bulb

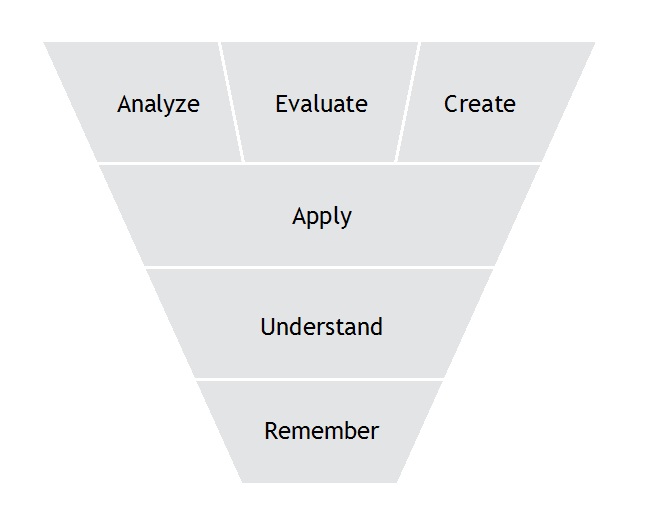
Bloom's cognitive domain organized as an inverted pyramid

== See also ==
- DIKW pyramid – Data, information, knowledge, wisdom hierarchy
- Educational psychology – Branch of psychology concerned with the scientific study of human learning
- Educational technology – Use of technology in education to enhance learning and teaching
- Fluid and crystallized intelligence – Factors of general intelligence
- Higher-order thinking – Concept in education and education reform
- In Over Our Heads – Book on psychological development by Robert Kegan
- Integrative complexity – Research psychometric
- Know-how – Knowledge of how to perform a task
- Ladder of inference – Metaphorical model of cognition and action by Chris Argyris
- Learning cycle – How people learn from experience
- Mastery learning – Instructional strategy and educational philosophy
- Metacognition – Self-awareness about thinking, higher-order thinking skills
- Model of hierarchical complexity – Framework for scoring a behavior's complexity
- Pedagogy – Theory and practice of education
- Physical education – Educational subject related to sport and exercise
- Reflective practice – Ability to reflect on one's actions so as to engage in a process of continuous learning
- Rubric (academic) – Scoring guide for assessment
- Structure of observed learning outcome – Model of levels of increasing complexity in understanding
- Wisdom – Combination of wit and virtue
