= John B. Biggs =

Australian writer and psychologist

John Biggs AM
- Born: John Burville Biggs; 25 October 1934 (age 92); Hobart, Australia
- Education: University of Tasmania (BA); University of London (PhD)
- Known for: Structure of observed learning outcomes Constructive alignment
- Scientific career
- Fields: Educational psychology
- Workplaces: University of Hong Kong
- Thesis: The psychological relationship between cognitive and affective factors in arithmetical performance (1962)
- Website: www.johnbiggs.com.au

John Burville Biggs AM (born 25 October 1934) is an Australian educational psychologist and novelist who developed the SOLO taxonomy for assessing the quality of learning outcomes, and the model of constructive alignment for designing teaching and assessment.

== Education ==
After studying psychology at the University of Tasmania (BA, 1957), he moved to the UK for doctoral studies at the University of London where he was awarded a PhD in 1962.

=== Career and research ===
Biggs has held university positions as Professor of Education in Australia, Canada and Hong Kong. His final institutional affiliation is as Honorary Professor of Psychology at the University of Hong Kong. His research interests are in how knowledge of student learning can be used to inform and enhance teaching.

He has developed the concepts of surface and deep approaches to learning. A surface approach is used to just meet the requirements of testing and examining while a deep apprach is used by student who intend to extract maximum meaning of what they are learning.

I am particularly interested in assessment methods and how they drive the way students learn. That means methods must be criterion- and not norm-referenced. It implies to that teaching methods must be part of the whole system, which leads to his most influential work: the concept of constructive alignment (CA). In CA the intended outcomes of learning are specified, the method of teaching is to engage students in activities likely to achieve those outcomes, and assessment is designed to tell how well those outcomes have been achieved. This design for teaching was first described in Teaching for Quality Learning at University in 1999, and is now published in its fifth edition with Catherine Tang and Gregor Kennedy as co-authors in 2022. He has published over a hundred articles and book chapters on student learning and related matters. Constructive aligned teaching is now used internationally and the concept of constructive alignment is used as a benchmark for quality assurance of teaching.

His academic memoir Changing Universities describes his involvement with universities in several countries up until his formal retirement in 2001, and how they have changed in that time. Since then universities have changed even more drastically, academic values being overridden by commercial and managerial issues with political demands seeing them as primarily just for vocational training.

Nonacademic writing.

Biggs has published six novels and several short stories, many of them award winning. Novels include: The Girl in the Golden House, Project Integrens, Disguises,From Ashes to Ashes. and Tin Dragons. Tasmania Over Five Generations is a social-political history of Tasmania as seen through the eyes of five generations of his own family. Towards Forgiveness: Sino-Tasmanian stories from two islands is a collection of short stories.

Awards and honours

Biggs was made a Member of the Order of Australia (AM) in the 2017 Queen's Birthday Honours. On 23 February 2022 he was awarded the Universities Australia Australian Awards for University Teaching Career Achievement Award.

== Personal life ==
He is married to Catherine Tang, who has also partnered his academic work. His son Zoltan Dienes is Professor of Psychology at Sussex University. He has step children from previous marriages, including Greg Biggs, now retired, and Carolyn Ashley who has won an award for her work in the pharmaceutical industry.
