= Structure of observed learning outcome =

Model of levels of increasing complexity in understanding

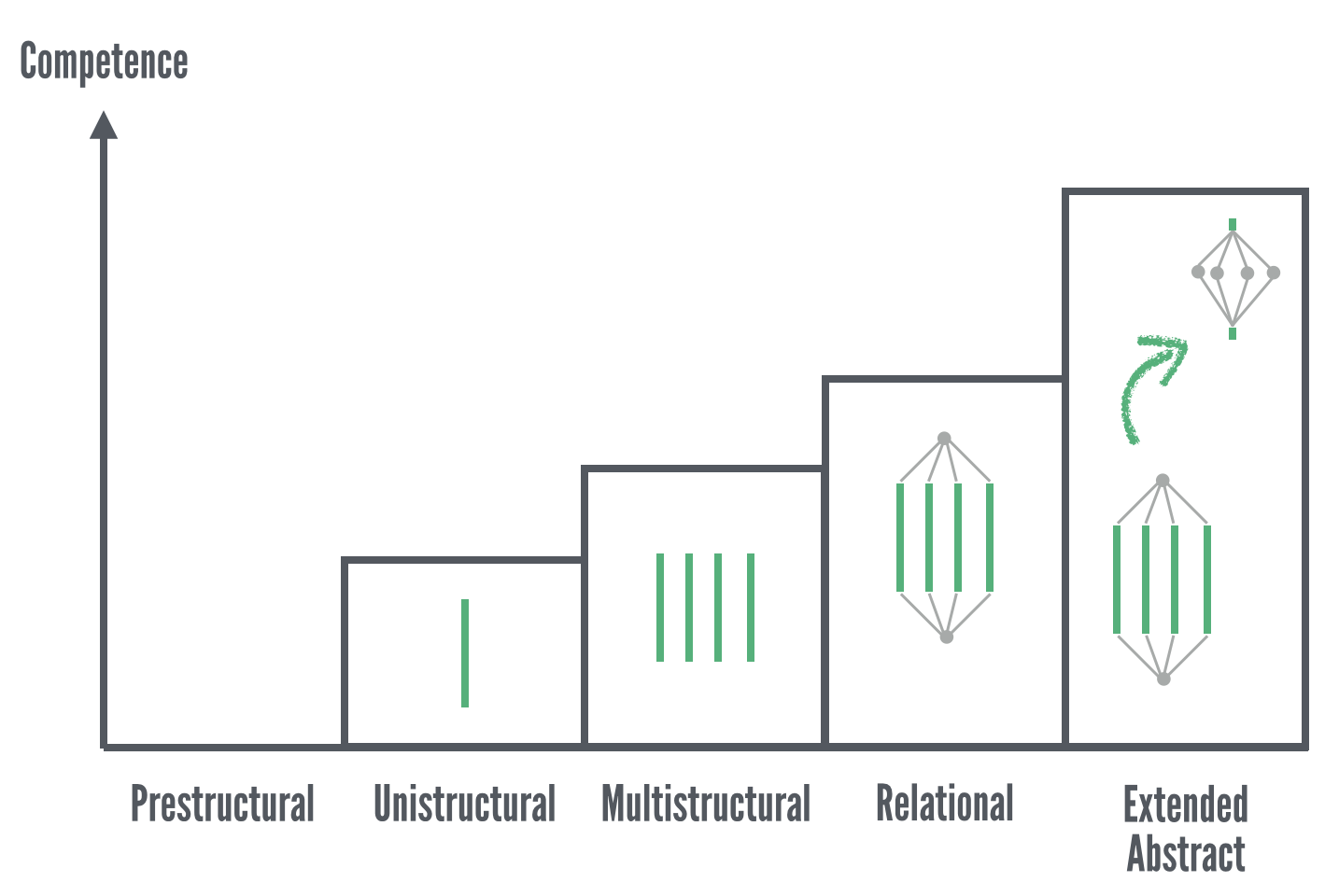
Diagram giving an overview of the SOLO Taxonomy approach.

The structure of observed learning outcomes (SOLO) taxonomy is a model that describes levels of increasing complexity in students' understanding of subjects. It was proposed by John B. Biggs and Kevin F. Collis.

The model consists of five levels of understanding:

- Pre-structural – The task is not attacked appropriately; the student hasn't really understood the point and uses too simple a way of going about it. Students in the pre-structural stage of understanding usually respond to questions with irrelevant comments.
- Uni-structural – The student's response only focuses on one relevant aspect. Students in the uni-structural stage of understanding usually give slightly relevant but vague answers that lack depth.
- Multi-structural – The student's response focuses on several relevant aspects but they are treated independently and additively. Assessment of this level is primarily quantitative. Students in the multi-structural stage may know the concept in tidbits but don't know how to present or explain it.
- Relational – The different aspects have become integrated into a coherent whole. This level is what is normally meant by an adequate understanding of some topic. At the relational stage, students can identify various patterns & view a topic from distinct perspectives.
- Extended abstract – The previous integrated whole may be conceptualised at a higher level of abstraction and generalised to a new topic or area. At this stage, students may apply the classroom concepts in real life.

== Comparison with Bloom's taxonomy ==
While Bloom's taxonomy categorizes cognitive skills from basic recall to higher-order thinking (Remember, Understand, Apply, Analyze, Evaluate, Create), the SOLO taxonomy assesses the depth and complexity of understanding, moving from surface to deep learning. Unlike Bloom's fixed hierarchical model, SOLO emphasizes a developmental progression that reflects a student's ability to integrate and generalize knowledge.

== See also ==
- DIKW pyramid – Data, information, knowledge, wisdom hierarchy
- Educational psychology – Branch of psychology concerned with the scientific study of human learning
- Educational technology – Use of technology in education to enhance learning and teaching
- Higher-order thinking – Concept in education and education reform
- In Over Our Heads – Book on psychological development by Robert Kegan
- Integrative complexity – Research psychometric
- Model of hierarchical complexity – Framework for scoring a behavior's complexity
