= Higher-order thinking =

Concept in education and education reform

Categories in the cognitive domain of Bloom's taxonomy (Anderson & Krathwohl, 2001)

Higher-order thinking, also known as higher order thinking skills (HOTS), is a concept applied in relation to education reform and based on learning taxonomies (such as American psychologist Benjamin Bloom's taxonomy). The idea is that some types of learning require more cognitive processing than others, but also have more generalized benefits. In Bloom's taxonomy, for example, skills involving analysis, evaluation and synthesis (creation of new knowledge) are thought to be of a higher order than the learning of facts and concepts using lower-order thinking skills, which require different learning and teaching methods. Higher-order thinking involves the learning of complex judgmental skills such as critical thinking and problem solving.

Higher-order thinking is considered more difficult to learn or teach but also more valuable because such skills are more likely to be usable in novel situations (i.e., situations other than those in which the skill was learned).

== Education reform ==
It is a notion that students must master the lower level skills before they can engage in higher-order thinking. However, the United States National Research Council objected to this line of reasoning, saying that cognitive research challenges that assumption, and that higher-order thinking is important even in elementary school.

Including higher-order thinking skills in educational aims and objectives is a very common feature of standards-based education reform.

Advocates of traditional education object to elevating HOTS above direct instruction of basic skills. Many forms of education reform, such as inquiry-based science, reform mathematics and whole language emphasize HOTS to solve problems and learn, sometimes deliberately omitting direct instruction of traditional methods, facts, or knowledge. HOTS assumes standards based assessments that use open-response items instead of multiple-choice questions, and hence require higher-order analysis and writing. Critics of standards based assessments point out that this style of testing is even more difficult for students who are behind academically. Indeed, while minorities may lag by 10 to 25 points on standardized percentile rankings, the failure rates of minorities are two to four times the best scoring groups on tests like the WASL. It is debated whether it is correct to raise the importance of teaching process over content.

The Republican Party of Texas expressed their opposition to the teaching of certain HOTS by including the following item in their 2012 Party Platform:

"Knowledge-Based Education – We oppose the teaching of Higher Order Thinking Skills (HOTS) (values clarification), critical thinking skills and similar programs that are simply a relabeling of Outcome-Based Education (OBE) (mastery learning) which focus on behavior modification and have the purpose of challenging the student's fixed beliefs and undermining parental authority."

However, the final wording of this item was evidently a "mistake" according to Republican Party of Texas Communications Director Chris Elam who said, in an interview with Talking Points Memo, that the plank should not have included the phrase "critical thinking skills" and it was not the intent of the subcommittee to indicate that the RPT was opposed to critical thinking skills. When asked to clarify the meaning of the item he said, "I think the intent is that the Republican Party is opposed to the values clarification method that serves the purpose of challenging students beliefs and undermine [sic] parental authority".

== See also ==
- DIKW pyramid – Data, information, knowledge, wisdom hierarchy
- Fluid and crystallized intelligence – Factors of general intelligence
- Integrative complexity – Research psychometric
- Metacognition – Self-awareness about thinking, higher-order thinking skills
- Methodology – Study of research methods
- Model of hierarchical complexity – Framework for scoring how complex a behavior is
- Structure of observed learning outcome – Model of levels of increasing complexity in understanding
