= Constructive alignment =

Principle in teaching

Constructive alignment is a principle used for devising teaching and learning activities, and assessment tasks, that directly address the intended learning outcomes (ILOs) in a way not typically achieved in traditional lectures, tutorial classes and examinations. Constructive alignment was devised by Professor John B. Biggs, and represents a marriage between a constructivist understanding of the nature of learning, and an aligned design for outcomes-based teaching education. It builds on the ideas proposed by Ralph W. Tyler in his best-selling 1949 book, Basic Principles of Curriculum and Instruction.

Constructive alignment is the underpinning concept behind the current requirements for programme specification, declarations of learning outcomes (LOs) and assessment criteria, and the use of criterion based assessment. There are two basic concepts behind constructive alignment:

- Learners construct meaning from what they do to learn. This concept derives from cognitive psychology and constructivist theory, and recognizes the importance of linking new material to concepts and experiences in the learner's memory, and extrapolation to possible future scenarios via the abstraction of basic principles through reflection.
- The teacher makes a deliberate alignment between the planned learning activities and the learning outcomes. This is a conscious effort to provide the learner with a clearly specified goal, a well designed learning activity or activities that are appropriate for the task, and well designed assessment criteria for giving feedback to the learner.

A branch of educational evaluation theory has emerged that focuses on constructive alignment as a key element in effective educational design. Known as design-focused evaluation, this approach seeks student feedback on the efficacy of the designed alignment between the intended learning outcomes and the teaching and learning activities students engage in during a course of study.

== See also ==
- Concept inventory
- Instructional scaffolding
