= Ideal tasks =

Concept in cognitive psychology

Ideal tasks arise during task analysis. Ideal tasks are different from real tasks. They are ideals in the Platonic sense of a circle being an ideal whereas a drawn circle is flawed and real. The study of theoretically best or “mathematically ideal” tasks (Green & Swets, 1966), has been the basis of the branch of stimulus control in psychology called Psychophysics as well as being part of Artificial Intelligence (e. g. Goel & Chandrasekaran, 1992). Such studies include the instantiation of such ideal tasks in the real world. The notion of the ideal task has also played an important role in information theory. Tasks are defined as sequences of contingencies, each presenting stimuli and requiring an action or a sequence of actions to occur in some non-arbitrary fashion. These contingencies may not only provide stimuli that require the discrimination of relations among actions and events but among task actions themselves. Again, Task actions, E, are actions that are required to complete tasks. Properties of tasks (usually the stimuli, or the relationship among stimuli and actions) are varied, and responses to them can be measured and analyzed.
