= Instructional scaffolding =

Support given to a student by an instructor

Instructional scaffolding is the support given to a student by an instructor throughout the learning process. This support is specifically tailored to each student; this instructional approach allows students to experience student-centered learning, which tends to facilitate more efficient learning than teacher-centered learning. This learning process promotes a deeper level of learning than many other common teaching strategies.

Instructional scaffolding provides sufficient support to promote learning when concepts and skills are being first introduced to students. These supports may include resource, compelling task, templates and guides, and/or guidance on the development of cognitive and social skills. Instructional scaffolding could be employed through modeling a task, giving advice, and/or providing coaching.

These supports are gradually removed as students develop autonomous learning strategies, thus promoting their own cognitive, affective and psychomotor learning skills and knowledge. Teachers help the students master a task or a concept by providing support. The support can take many forms such as outlines, recommended documents, storyboards, or key questions.

== Essential features ==
There are three essential features of scaffolding that facilitate learning.

1. The first feature is the interaction between the learner and the expert. This interaction should be collaborative for it to be effective.
2. The second is that learning should take place in the learner's zone of proximal development. To do that the expert needs to be aware of the learner's current level of knowledge and then work to a certain extent beyond that level.
3. The third feature of scaffolding is that the scaffold, the support and guidance provided by the expert, is gradually removed as the learner becomes more proficient.

The support and guidance provided to the learner are compared to the scaffolds in building construction where the scaffolds provide both "adjustable and temporal" support to the building under construction. The support and guidance provided to learners facilitate internalization of the knowledge needed to complete the task. This support is weaned gradually until the learner is independent.

== Effective scaffolding ==
For scaffolding to be effective teachers need to pay attention to the following:

1. The selection of the learning task: The task should ensure that learners use the developing skills that need to be mastered. The task should also be engaging and interesting to keep learners involved. This task should be neither too difficult nor too easy for the learner.
2. The anticipation of errors: After choosing the task, the teacher needs to anticipate errors the learners are likely to commit when working on the task. Anticipation of errors enables the scaffolder to properly guide the learners away from ineffective directions.
3. The application of scaffolds during the learning task: Scaffolds could be organized in "simple skill acquisition or they may be dynamic and generative".
4. The consideration of emotional issues: Scaffolding is not limited to a cognitive skill and can also support emotional responses (affect). For example, during a task the scaffolder (expert) might need to manage and control for frustration and loss of interest that could be experienced by the learner. Encouragement is also an important scaffolding component.

== Theory of scaffolding ==
Scaffolding theory was first introduced in the late 1950s by Jerome Bruner, a cognitive psychologist. He used the term to describe young children's oral language acquisition. Helped by their parents when they first start learning to speak, young children are provided with informal instructional formats within which their learning is facilitated. A scaffolding format investigated by Bruner and his postdoctoral student Anat Ninio, whose scaffolding processes are described in detail, is joint picture-book reading. By contrast, bed-time stories and read-alouds are examples of book-centered parenting events without scaffolding interaction. Scaffolding is inspired by Lev Vygotsky's concept of an expert assisting a novice, or an apprentice. Scaffolding is changing the level of support to suit the cognitive potential of the child. Over the course of a teaching session, one can adjust the amount of guidance to fit the child's potential level of performance. More support is offered when a child is having difficulty with a particular task and, over time, less support is provided as the child makes gains on the task. Ideally, scaffolding works to maintain the child's potential level of development in the zone of proximal development (ZPD). An essential element to the ZPD and scaffolding is the acquisition of language. According to Vygotsky, language (and in particular, speech) is fundamental to children's cognitive growth because language provides purpose and intention so that behaviors can be better understood. Through the use of speech, children are able to communicate to and learn from others through dialogue, which is an important tool in the ZPD. In a dialogue, a child's unsystematic, disorganized, and spontaneous concepts are met with the more systematic, logical and rational concepts of the skilled helper. Empirical research suggests that the benefits of scaffolding are not only useful during a task, but can extend beyond the immediate situation in order to influence future cognitive development. For instance, a recent study recorded verbal scaffolding between mothers and their 3- and 4-year-old children as they played together. Then, when the children were six years old, they underwent several measures of executive function, such as working memory and goal-directed play. The study found that the children's working memory and language skills at six years of age were related to the amount of verbal scaffolding provided by mothers at age three. In particular, scaffolding was most effective when mothers provided explicit conceptual links during play. Therefore, the results of this study not only suggest that verbal scaffolding aids children's cognitive development, but that the quality of the scaffolding is also important for learning and development.

A construct that is critical for scaffolding instruction is Vygotsky's concept of the zone of proximal development (ZPD). The zone of proximal development is the field between what a learner can do on their own (expert stage) and the most that can be achieved with the support of a knowledgeable peer or instructor (pedagogical stage). Vygotsky was convinced that a child could be taught any subject efficiently using scaffolding practices by implementing the scaffolds through the zone of proximal development. Students are escorted and monitored through learning activities that function as interactive conduits to get them to the next stage. Thus the learner obtains or raises new understandings by building on their prior knowledge through the support delivered by more capable individuals. Several peer-reviewed studies have shown that when there is a deficiency in guided learning experiences and social interaction, learning and development are obstructed. Moreover, several things influence the ZPD of students, ranging from the collaboration of peers to technology available in the classroom.

In writing instruction, support is typically presented in verbal form (discourse). The writing tutor engages the learner's attention, calibrates the task, motivates the student, identifies relevant task features, controls for frustration, and demonstrates as needed. Through joint activities, the teacher scaffolds conversation to maximize the development of a child's intrapsychological functioning. In this process, the adult controls the elements of the task that are beyond the child's ability, all the while increasing the expectations of what the child is able to do. Speech, a critical tool to scaffold thinking and responding, plays a crucial role in the development of higher psychological processes because it enables thinking to be more abstract, flexible, and independent. From a Vygotskian perspective, talk and action work together with the sociocultural fabric of the writing event to shape a child's construction of awareness and performance. Dialogue may range from casual talk to deliberate explanations of features of written language. The talk embedded in the actions of the literacy event shapes the child's learning as the tutor regulates his or her language to conform to the child's degrees of understanding. shows that what may seem like casual conversational exchanges between tutor and student actually offer many opportunities for fostering cognitive development, language learning, story composition for writing, and reading comprehension. Conversations facilitate generative, constructive, experimental, and developmental speech and writing in the development of new ideas.

In Vygotsky's words, "what the child is able to do in collaboration today he will be able to do independently tomorrow".

Some ingredients of scaffolding are predictability, playfulness, focus on meaning, role reversal, modeling, and nomenclature.

== Levels and types in the educational setting ==
According to Saye and Brush, there are two levels of scaffolding: soft and hard. An example of soft scaffolding in the classroom would be when a teacher circulates the room and converses with his or her students. The teacher may question their approach to a difficult problem and provide constructive feedback to the students. According to Van Lier, this type of scaffolding can also be referred to as contingent scaffolding. The type and amount of support needed is dependent on the needs of the students during the time of instruction. Unfortunately, applying scaffolding correctly and consistently can be difficult when the classroom is large and students have various needs. Scaffolding can be applied to a majority of the students, but the teacher is left with the responsibility to identify the need for additional scaffolding.

In contrast with contingent or soft scaffolding, embedded or hard scaffolding is planned in advance to help students with a learning task that is known in advance to be difficult. For example, when students are discovering the formula for the Pythagorean Theorem in math class, the teacher may identify hints or cues to help the student reach an even higher level of thinking. In both situations, the idea of "expert scaffolding" is being implemented: the teacher in the classroom is considered the expert and is responsible for providing scaffolding for the students.

Reciprocal scaffolding, a method first coined by Holton and Thomas, is a method that involves a group of two or more collaboratively working together. In this situation, the group can learn from each other's experiences and knowledge. The scaffolding is shared by each member and changes constantly as the group works on a task. According to Vygotsky, students develop higher-level thinking skills when scaffolding occurs with an adult expert or with a peer of higher capabilities. Conversely, Piaget believes that students discard their ideas when paired with an adult or student of more expertise. Instead, students should be paired with others who have different perspectives. Conflicts would then take place between students allowing them to think constructively at a higher level.

Technical scaffolding is a newer approach in which computers replace the teachers as the experts or guides, and students can be guided with web links, online tutorials, or help pages. Educational software can help students follow a clear structure and allows students to plan properly.

=== Directive and supportive scaffolding ===
Silliman and Wilkinson distinguish two types of scaffolding: 'supportive scaffolding' that characterises the IRF (Initiation-Response-Follow-up) pattern; and 'directive scaffolding' that refers to IRE (Initiation-Response-Evaluation). Saxena (2010) develops these two notions theoretically by incorporating Bhaktin's (1981) and van Lier's (1996) works. Within the IRE pattern, teachers provide 'directive scaffolding' on the assumption that their job is to transmit knowledge and then assess its appropriation by the learners. The question-answer-evaluation sequence creates a predetermined standard for acceptable participation and induces passive learning. In this type of interaction, the teacher holds the right to evaluate and asks 'known-information' questions which emphasise the reproduction of information. The nature and role of the triadic dialogue have been oversimplified and the potential for the roles of teachers and students in them has been undermined.

If, in managing the talk, teachers apply 'constructive power' and exploit students' responses as occasions for joint exploration, rather than simply evaluating them, then the classroom talk becomes dialogic. The pedagogic orientation of this talk becomes 'participation orientation', in contrast to 'display/assessment orientation' of IRE. In this kind of pattern of interaction, the third part of the triadic dialogue offers 'follow-up' and teachers' scaffolding becomes 'supportive'. Rather than producing 'authoritative discourse', teachers construct 'internally persuasive discourse' that allows 'equality' and 'symmetry' wherein the issues of power, control, institutional managerial positioning, etc. are diffused or suspended. The discourse opens up the roles for students as the 'primary knower' and the 'sequence initiator', which allows them to be the negotiator and co-constructor of meaning. The suspension of asymmetry in the talk represents a shift in the teacher's ideological stance and, therefore, demonstrates that supportive scaffolding is more than simply a model of instruction.

== The role of guidance ==
=== Guidance and cognitive load ===
Learner support in scaffolding is known as guidance. While it takes on various forms and styles, the basic form of guidance is any type of interaction from the instructor that is intended to aid and/or improve student learning. While this a broad definition, the role and amount of guidance is better defined by the instructor's approach. Instructionists and constructionists approach giving guidance within their own instructional frameworks. Scaffolding involves presenting learners with proper guidance that moves them towards their learning goals. Providing guidance is a method of moderating the cognitive load of a learner. In scaffolding, learners can only be moved toward their learning goals if cognitive load is held in check by properly administered support.

Traditional teachers tend to give a higher level of deductive, diadactic instruction, with each piece of a complex task being broken down. This teacher-centered approach, consequently, tends to increase the cognitive load for students.

Constructivist instructors, in contrast, approach instruction from the approach of guided discovery with a particular emphasis on transfer. The concept of transfer focuses on a learner's ability to apply learned tasks in a context other than the one in which it was learned. This results in constructivist instructors, unlike classical ones, giving a higher level of guidance than instruction.

=== Amount of guidance ===
Research has demonstrated that higher level of guidance has a greater effect on scaffolded learning, but is not a guarantee of more learning. The efficacy of higher amount of guidance is dependent on the level of detail and guidance applicability. Having multiple types of guidance (i.e. worked examples, feedback) can cause them to interact and reinforce each other. Multiple conditions do not guarantee greater learning, as certain types of guidance can be extraneous to the learning goals or the modality of learning. With this, more guidance (if not appropriate to the learning) can negatively impact performance, as it gives the learner overwhelming levels of information. However, appropriately designed high levels of guidance, which properly interact with the learning, is more beneficial to learning than low levels of guidance.

=== Context of guidance ===
Constructivists pay close attention to the context of guidance because they believe instruction plays a major role in knowledge retention and transfer. Research studies demonstrate how the context of isolated explanations can have an effect on student-learning outcomes. For example, Hake's (1998) large-scale study demonstrated how post-secondary physics students recalled less than 30% of material covered in a traditional lecture-style class. Similarly, other studies illustrate how students construct different understandings from explanation in isolation versus having a first experience with the material. A first, experience with the material provides students with a "need to know", which allows learners to reflect on prior experiences with the content, which can help learners construct meaning from instruction. Worked examples are guiding tools that can act as a "need to know" for students. Worked examples provide students with straightforward goals, step-by-step instructions as well as ready-to-solve problems that can help students develop a stronger understanding from instruction.

=== Timing of guidance ===
Guiding has a key role in both constructivism and 'instructivism'. For instructivists, the timing of guidance is immediate, either at the beginning or when the learner makes a mistake, whereas in constructivism it can be delayed. It has been found that immediate feedback can lead to working memory load as it does not take in consideration the process of gradual acquisition of a skill, which also relates to the amount of guidance being given. Research on intelligent-tutoring systems suggests that immediate feedback on errors is a great strategy to promote learning. As the learner is able to integrate the feedback from short-term memory into the overall learning- and problem-solving task, the longer the wait on feedback and the harder it is for the learner to make this integration. Yet, in another study it was found that providing feedback right after the error can deprive the learner of the opportunity to develop evaluative skills. Wise and O'Neill bring these two, seemingly contradictory findings, and argue that it does not only prove the importance of the role of feedback, but that points out a timing feature of feedback: immediate feedback in the short term promotes more rapid problem-solving, but delaying feedback can result in better retention and transfer in the long term.

=== Constructivism and guidance ===
Constructivism views knowledge as a "function of how the individual creates meaning from his or her own experiences". Constructivists advocate that learning is better facilitated in a minimally guided environment where learners construct important information for themselves. According to constructivism, minimal guidance in the form of process or task related information should be provided to learners upon request and direct instruction of learning strategies should not be used because it impedes the natural processes learners use to recall prior experiences. In this view, for learners to construct knowledge they should be provided with the goals and minimal information and support. Applications that promote constructivist learning require learners to solve authentic problems or "acquire knowledge in information-rich settings". An example of an application of constructivist learning is science instruction, where students are asked to discover the principles of science by imitating the steps and actions of researchers.

=== Instructivism and guidance ===
Instructionism are educational practices characterized for being instructor-centered. Some authors see instructionism as a highly prescriptive practice that mostly focuses on the formation of skills, that is very product-oriented and is not interactive; or that is a highly structured, systematic and explicit way of teaching that gives emphasis to the role of the teacher as a transmitter of knowledge and the students as passive receptacles. The 'transmission' of knowledge and skills from the teacher to the student in this context is often manifested in the form of drill, practice and rote memorization. An 'instructionist', then, focuses on the preparation, organization and management of the lesson making sure the plan is detailed and the communication is effective. The emphasis is on the up-front explicit delivery of instruction.

Instructionism is often contrasted with constructivism. Both of them use the term guidance as means to support learning, and how it can be used more effectively. The difference in the use of guidance is found in the philosophical assumptions regarding the nature of the learner, but they also differ in their views around the quantity, the context and the timing of guidance. An example of application of instructionism in the classroom is direct instruction.

=== Minimal guidance in education ===
With traditional power dynamics in the classroom, the teacher is the authority. In order to engage in meaningful student talk, we need to break this hierarchy.

Minimal guidance is a general term applied to a variety of pedagogical approaches such as inquiry learning, learner-centered pedagogy, student-centered learning, project-based learning, and discovery learning. It is the idea that learners, regardless of their level of expertise, will learn best through discovering and/or constructing information for themselves in contrast to more teacher-led classrooms which in contrast are described as more passive learning.

A safe approach is to offer three options. The teacher designs two options based on what most students may like to do. The third choice is a blank check – students propose their own product or performance.

In this approach, the role of the teacher may change from what has been described as "sage on the stage" to "guide on the side" with one example of this change in practice being that teachers will not tend to answer questions from students directly, but instead will ask questions back to students to prompt further thinking. This change in teaching style has also been described as being a "facilitator of learning" instead of being a "dispenser of knowledge".

Minimal guidance is regarded as controversial and has been described as a caricature that does not exist in practice, and that critics have combined too many different approaches some of which may include more guidance, under the label of minimal guidance. However, there is some evidence that in certain domains, and under certain circumstances, a minimal guidance approach can lead to successful learning if sufficient practice opportunities are built in.

==== Minimal guidance in education: criticisms and controversies ====
One strand of criticism of the minimal guidance approach originating in cognitive load theory is that it does not align with human cognitive architecture making it an inefficient approach to learning for beginner learners in particular. In this strand of criticism, minimal guidance approaches are contrasted with fully guided approaches to instruction which better match inherent human cognitive architecture. While accepting this general line of argument, counter-arguments for individual approaches such as problem-based learning have highlighted how these are not minimal guidance approaches, and are consistent with human cognitive architecture. Other strands of criticism suggest that there is little empirical evidence for the effectiveness of learner-centered approaches when compared to more teacher-led approaches, and this is despite extensive encouragement and support from national and international education agencies including UNESCO, UNICEF, and the World Bank. Further more specific criticisms include the following: minimal guidance is inefficient compared to explicit instruction due to a lack of worked examples, minimal guidance leads to reduced opportunities for student practice, and minimal guidance happens inevitably in project-based learning as a result of the teacher having to manage too many student projects at one time.

==== Minimal guidance in education: synthesis and solutions ====
One of the consequences of this reconceptualization is abandoning the rigid explicit instruction versus minimal guidance dichotomy and replacing it with a more flexible approach based on differentiating specific goals of various learner activities in complex learning.

There have been several attempts to move beyond the minimal guidance versus fully guided instruction controversy. These are often developed by introducing the variable of learner expertise and using that to suggest adapting instructional styles depending on the level of expertise of the learner, with more expert learners generally requiring less direct instruction. For example, despite providing many of the criticisms of minimal guidance, cognitive load theory does also suggest a role for less direct guidance from the teacher as learners become more expert due to the expertise reversal effect. Other attempts at synthesis include using pedagogies more associated with martial arts instruction that apply explicit instruction as a means of fostering student discovery through repeated practice.

If instead we entertain the possibility that instruction and discovery are not oil and water, that instruction and discovery coexist and can work together, we may find a solution to this impasse in the field. Perhaps our way out of the instructivist-constructivist impasse thus involves not a "middle ground" compromise but an alternative conceptualization of instruction and discovery.

=== Applications ===
Instructional scaffolding can be thought of as the strategies that a teacher uses to help learners bridge a cognitive gap or progress in their learning to a level they were previously unable to accomplish. These strategies evolve as the teachers evaluate the learners initial level of ability and then through continued feedback throughout the progression of the task. In the early studies, scaffolding was primarily done in oral, face- to-face learning environments. In classrooms, scaffolding may include modelling behaviours, coaching and prompting, thinking out loud, dialogue with questions and answers, planned and spontaneous discussions, as well as other interactive planning or structural assistance to help the learner bridge a cognitive gap. This can also include peer mentoring from more experienced students. These peers can be referred to as MKOs. MKO stands for 'More Knowledgeable Other'. The MKO is a person who has a higher understanding of an idea or concept and can bridge this cognitive gap. This includes teachers, parents, and as stated before, peers. MKOs are central part of the process of learning in the ZPD, or Zone of Proximal Development. An MKO may help a student using scaffolding, with the goal being that the student can eventually lead themselves to the answer on their own, without the help of anyone else. The MKO may use a gradual reduction of assistance in order to facilitate this, as described earlier.

There are a wide variety of scaffolding strategies that teachers employ. One approach to looking at the application of scaffolding is to look at a framework for evaluating these strategies. This model was developed based on the theoretical principles of scaffolding to highlight the use of scaffolding for educational purposes. It highlights two components of an instructor's use of scaffolding. The first is the instructors intentions and the second refers to the means by which the scaffolding is carried out.

Scaffolding intentions: These groups highlight the instructors intentions for scaffolding

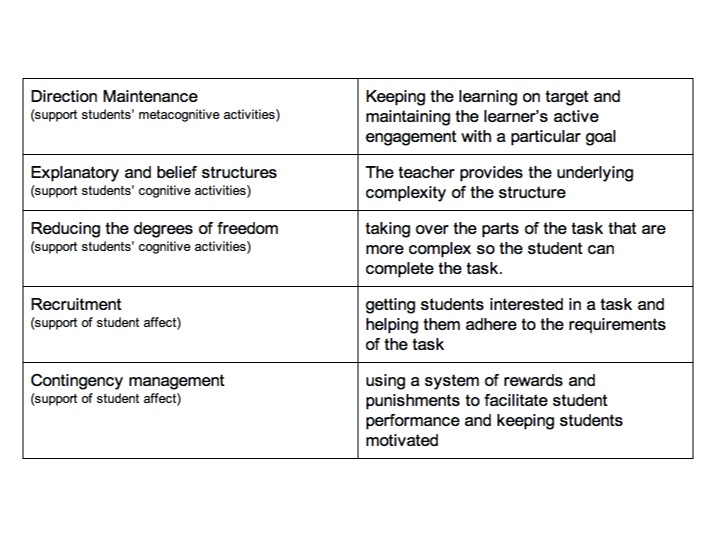

Scaffolding means: These groups highlight the ways in which the instructor scaffolds

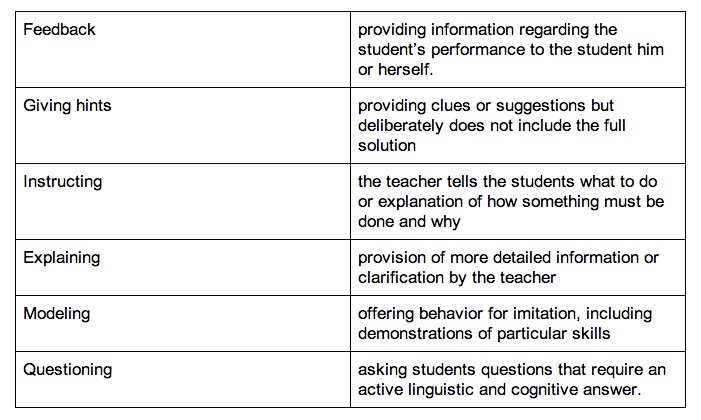

Any combination of scaffolding means with scaffolding intention can be construed as a scaffolding strategy, however, whether a teaching strategy qualifies as good scaffolding generally depends upon its enactment in actual practice and more specifically upon whether the strategy is applied contingently and whether it is also part of a process of fading and transfer of responsibility.

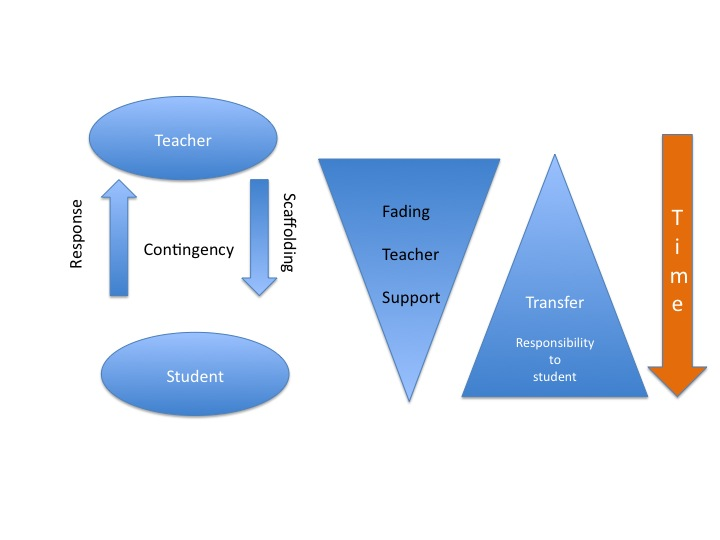

Examples of scaffolding:

Instructors can use a variety of scaffolds to accommodate different levels of knowledge. The context of learning (i.e. novice experience, complexity of the task) may require more than one scaffold strategy in order for the student to master new content. The following table outlines a few common scaffolding strategies:

| Instructional scaffolds | Description of tool |
|---|---|
| Advanced organizers | Advanced organizers are tools that present new information or concepts to learners. These tools organize information in a way that helps learners understand new and complex content. Examples of advanced organizers are: Venn diagrams; Flowcharts; Outlines; Rubrics |
| Modelling | Instructors demonstrate desired behaviour, knowledge or task to students. Instructors use modelling to: Demonstrate the task students are expected to complete on their own (i.e. science experiment); Provide step-by-step instructions (i.e. illustrate steps to solving a mathematical problem); Encourage students to interact with a new problem or task (i.e. hands-on task that allows students to interact with materials and develop a "need to know") |
| Worked examples | A worked example is a step-by-step demonstration of a complex problem or task. These types of instructional materials are commonly implemented in mathematics and science classes and include three key features: 1. Problem formation: A principle or theory is introduced.; 2. Step-by-step example: A worked example, that demonstrates how the student can solve the problem, is provided.; 3. Solution to the problem: One or more read-to-be solved problems are given for the student to practice the skill. |
| Concept maps | Concept maps are graphical tools for organizing, representing and displaying the relationships between knowledge and concepts. Types of concept maps are: Spider map; Hierarchal/chronological map; Systems map; Variation: mind map |
| Explanations | Explanations are ways in which instructors present and explain new content to learners. How new information is presented to the learner is a critical component for effective instruction. The use of materials such as visual images, graphic organizers, animated videos, audio files and other technological features can make explanations more engaging, motivating and meaningful for student learning. |
| Handouts | Handouts are a supplementary resource used to support teaching and learning. These tools can provide students with the necessary information (i.e. concept or theory, task instructions, learning goals, learning objectives) and practice (i.e. ready-to-be-solved problems) they need to master new content and skills. Handouts are helpful tools for explanations and worked examples. |
| Prompts | Prompts are a physical or verbal cue to aid recall of prior or assumed knowledge. There are different types of prompts, such as: Physical: body movements such as pointing, nodding, finger or foot tapping.; Verbal: words, statements and questions that help the learner respond correctly.; Positional: placing materials in a specific location that prompts positive student reaction. |

=== Scaffolding mediated by technology ===
When students who are not physically present in the classroom, instructors often adapt their teaching styles and adjust scaffolding needs to adapt to the new learning environment, which are often challenging.

The recent spread of technology used in education has opened up the learning environment to include AI-based methods, hypermedia, hypertext, collaborative learning environments, and web-based learning environments. This challenges traditional learning design conceptions of scaffolding for educators.

A 2014 review of the types of scaffolding used in online learning identified four main types of scaffolding:

- conceptual scaffolding: helps students decide what to consider in learning and guide them to key concepts
- procedural scaffolding: helps students use appropriate tools and resources effectively
- strategic scaffolding: helps students find alternative strategies and methods to solve complex problems
- metacognitive scaffolding: prompts students to think about what they are learning throughout the process and assists students reflecting on what they have learnt (self-assessment). This is the most common research area and is thought to not only promote higher-order thinking but also students' ability to plan ahead. Reingold, Rimor and Kalay have listed seven mechanisms of metacognitive scaffolding that encourage students' metacognition in learning.

These four types are structures that appropriately support students' learning in online environments. Other scaffolding approaches that were addressed by the researchers included: technical support, content support, argumentation template, questioning and modelling. These terms were rarely used, and it was argued that these areas had unclear structure to guide students, especially in online learning, and were inadequately justified.

As technology changes, so does the form of support provided to online learners. Instructors have the challenge of adapting scaffolding techniques to this new medium, but also the advantage of using new web-based tools such as wikis and blogs as platforms to support and discuss with students.

==== Benefits in online learning environments ====
As the research in this area progresses, studies are showing that when students learn about complex topics with computer-based learning environments (CBLEs) without scaffolding they demonstrated poor ability to regulate their learning, and failure to gain a conceptual understanding of the topic. As a result, researchers have recently begun to emphasize the importance of embedded conceptual, procedural, strategic, and metacognitive scaffolding in CBLEs.

In addition to the four scaffolding guidelines outlined, recent research has shown:

- scaffolding can help in group discussions. In a 2012 study, a significant increase in active participation and meaningful negotiations was found within the scaffolded groups as opposed to the non-scaffolded group.
- metacognitive scaffolding can be used to encourage students in reflecting and help build a sense of a community among learners. Specifically, Reingold, Rimor and Kalay recommend using metacognitive scaffolding to support students working on a common task. They believe this can support learners to experience their work as part of a community of learners.

Online classes do not require movement need to a different city or long distances in order to attend the program of one's choice. Online learning allows a flexible schedule. Assessments are completed at the learner's pace. It makes it easier for introverted students to ask questions or drop their ideas, which boost their confidence.

Online education is cost-effective and reduces travel expenses for both the learning institution and students. It improves technology literacy for teachers and students.

==== Downfalls in online learning environments ====
An online learning environment warrants many factors for scaffolding to be successful; this includes basic knowledge of using technology, social interactions and reliance on students' individual motivation and initiative for learning. Collaboration is key to instructional scaffolding and can be lost without proper guidance from an instructor creating and initiating an online social space.

The instructor's role in creating a social space for online interaction has been found to increase students' confidence in understanding the content and goals of the course. If an instructor does not create this space, a student misses out on critical thinking, evaluating material and collaborating with fellow students to foster learning. Even with instructors implementing a positive social space online, a research study found that students' perceptions of incompetence to other classmates is not affected by positive online social spaces, but this was found to be less of a problem in face to face courses.

Due to the distance learning that encompasses an online environment, self-regulation is essential for scaffolding to be effective; a study has shown that procrastinators are at a disadvantage in online distance learning and are not able to be scaffolded in the same degree as if there was an in-person instructor.

According to the National Centre for Biotechnology Information research paper, teacher-student interactions are not what they used to be. Social relationships among teachers and their students are weakened due to online learning. Teachers tend to have low expectations from their students during online classes, which leads to low participation. Online education increases the risk of anxiety disorder, clinical depression, apathy, learned helplessness, and burnout. Learners without access to a laptop and the internet are often left out of the online learning world. Online learning courses do not provide enough verbal interaction, which makes it difficult for teachers to measure student engagement and learning outcomes. Students with disabilities often require special software to access educational resources online.

Students who had more desire to master the content than to receive higher grades were more successful in the online courses. A study by Artino and Stephens found that graduate students were more motivated in online courses than undergraduate students but suggests that academic level may contribute to the amount of technological support needed for positive learning outcomes, finding that undergraduate students needed less support than graduate students when navigating an online course.

== See also ==
- Collaborative learning – Situation in which two or more people learn or attempt to learn something together
- Constructive alignment – Principle in teaching
- Distributed scaffolding – Learner-centric pedagogy
- Educational psychology – Branch of psychology concerned with the scientific study of human learning
- Knowledge base – Information repository with multiple applications
- Metacognition – Self-awareness about thinking, higher-order thinking skills
- Social constructionism – Sociological theory regarding shared understandings
