= DIKW pyramid =

Data, information, knowledge, wisdom hierarchy

A standard representation of the pyramid form of DIKW models, from 2007 and earlier

The DIKW pyramid (also known as the knowledge pyramid or information hierarchy) refers to models of possible structural and functional relationships between a set of components—often four: data, information, knowledge, and wisdom. The concept has roots predating the 1980s. In the latter years of that decade, interest in the models grew after explicit presentations and discussions, including from Milan Zeleny, Russell Ackoff, and Robert W. Lucky. Subsequent important discussions extended along theoretical and practical lines into the coming decades.

While debate continues as to the actual meaning of the component terms of DIKW-type models, and the actual nature of their relationships (including occasional doubt being cast over any simple, linear, unidirectional model), they have become very popular visual representations in business, the military, and other fields. Not all DIKW-type models include four components (earlier ones excluding "data", later ones excluding or downplaying "wisdom", and several including additional components, for instance Ackoff inserting "understanding" before and Zeleny adding "enlightenment" after the "wisdom" component). In addition, DIKW-type models are no longer always presented as pyramids, instead as charts or frameworks (e.g., by Zeleny), as flow diagrams (e.g., by Liew, and by Chisholm et al.), as chains, and sometimes as continuums (e.g., by Choo et al.).

== Short description ==
As Rowley noted in 2007, the DIKW model "is often quoted, or used implicitly, in definitions of data, information and knowledge in the information management, information systems and knowledge management literatures, but [as of that date] there ha[d] been limited direct discussion of the hierarchy". Reviews of textbooks and a survey of scholars in relevant fields indicate that there was not a consensus as to definitions used in the model as of that date, and as reviewed by Liew in that year, even less "in the description of the processes that transform components lower in the hierarchy into those above them".

Zins work, published in 2007—from studies in 2003-2005 that documented "130 definitions of data, information, and knowledge formulated by 45 scholars", published in 2007—to suggest that the data–information–knowledge components of DIKW refer to a class of no less than five models, as a function of whether data, information, and knowledge are each conceived of as subjective, objective (what Zins terms, "universal" or "collective") or both. In Zins' usage, subjective and objective "are not related to arbitrariness and truthfulness, which are usually attached to the concepts of subjective knowledge and objective knowledge". Information science, Zins argues, studies data and information, but not knowledge, as knowledge is an internal (subjective) rather than an external (universal–collective) phenomenon.

== Representations ==
=== Graphical representation ===
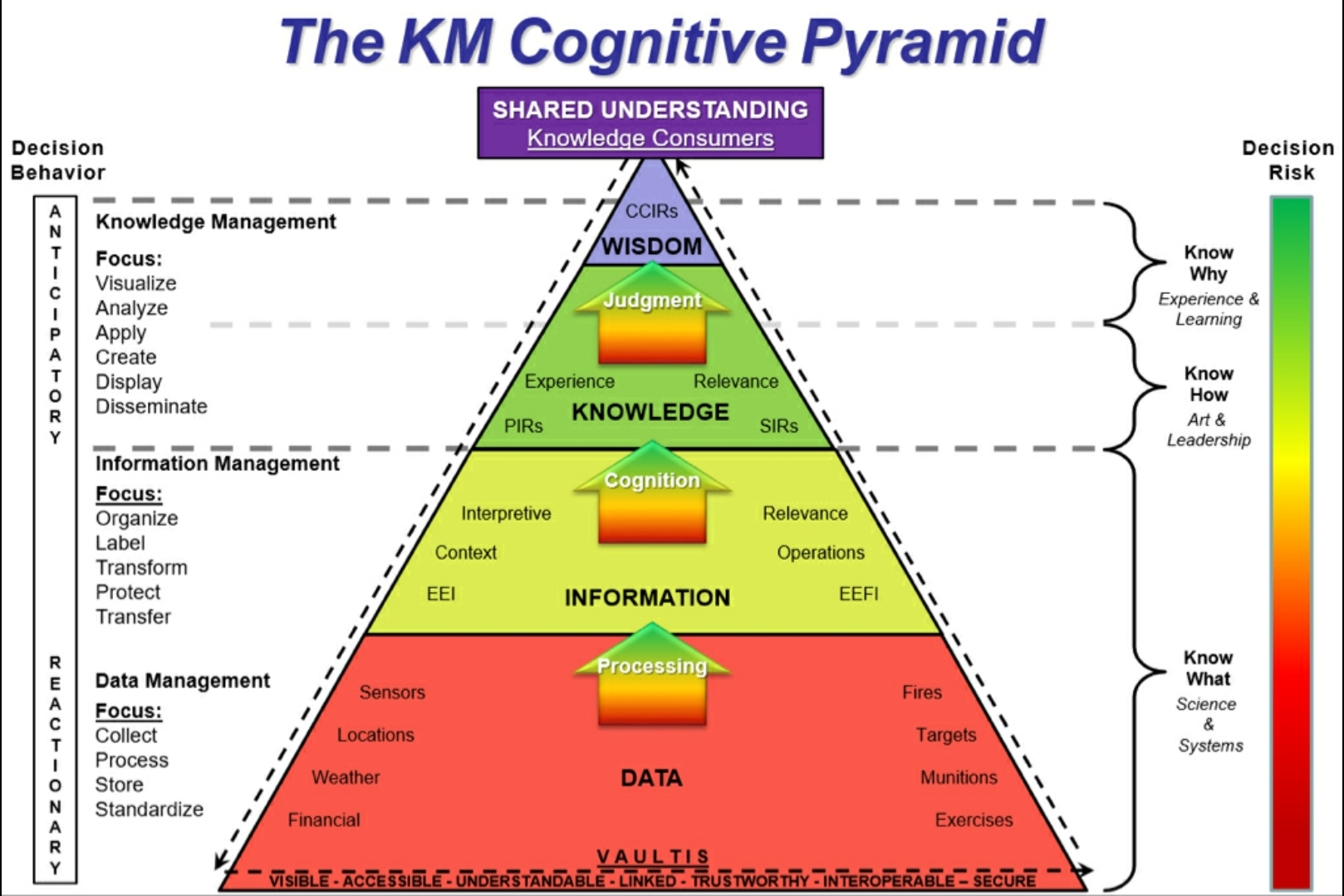
A representation of the DIKW pyramid, as it is purported to have evolved in the Department of Defense (author and date of origin unknown, traceable only to 2022)

DIKW is a hierarchical model often depicted as a pyramid, sometimes as a chain, with data at its base and wisdom at its apex (or chain-beginning and -end). Both Zeleny and Ackoff have been credited with originating the pyramid representation, although neither used a pyramid to present their ideas. According to Wallace, Debons and colleagues may have been the first to "present the hierarchy graphically".

Many variations of the DIKW-type pyramid have been produced. One, in use by knowledge managers in the United States Department of Defense, attempts to show the DIKW progression to enable effective decisions and consequent activities supporting shared understanding throughout defense organizations, as well as supporting management of risks associated with decisions.

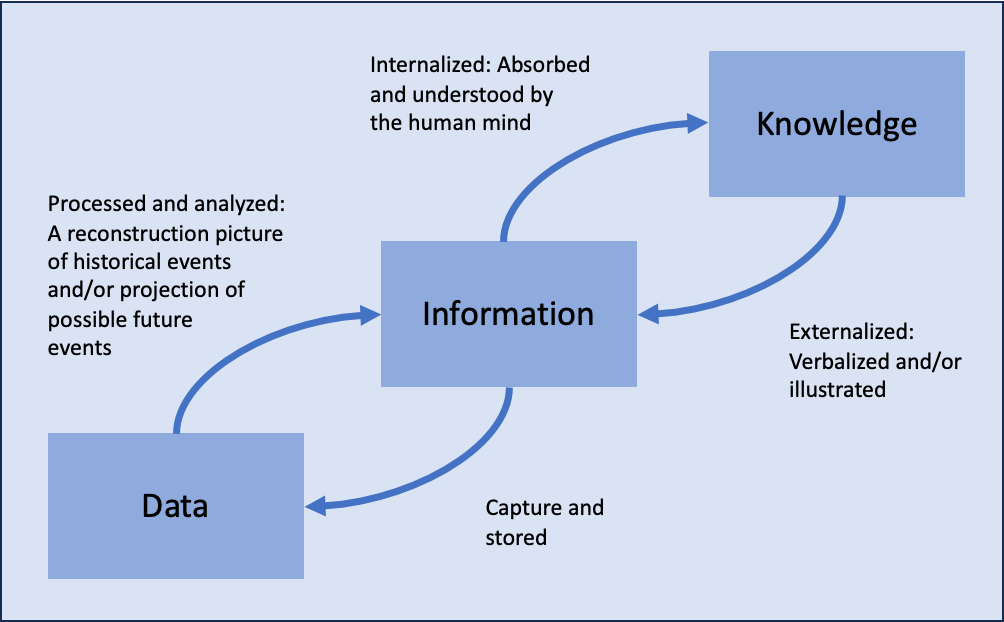
A non-pyramidal example of DIKW-pyramid–type information, from Liew (2007)

DIKW-type hierarchical information paradigms have also been represented as two-dimensional charts, and as flow diagrams, where relationships between the components may be presented less hierarchically, with defining aspects of the relationships, feedback loops, etc.

=== Computational representation ===
Intelligent decision support systems are trying to improve decision making by introducing new technologies and methods from the domain of modeling and simulation in general, and in particular from the domain of intelligent software agents in the contexts of agent-based modeling.

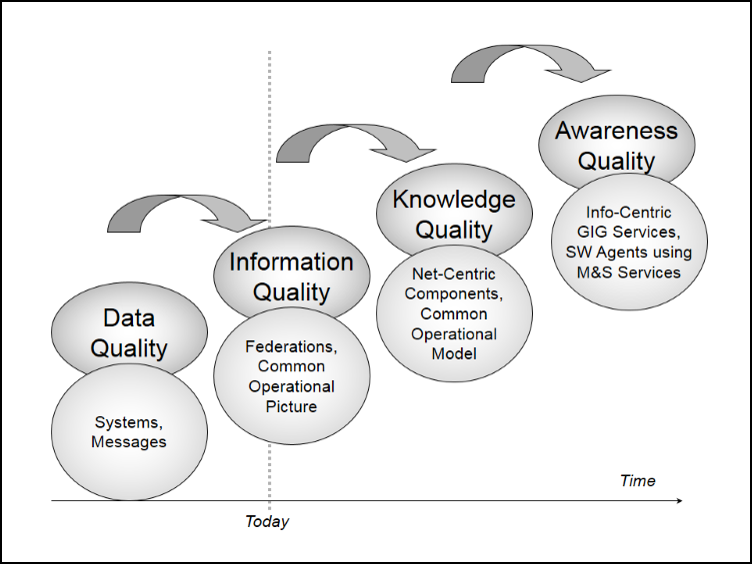
Ackoff's 1989 conception of a DIKW-type hierarchy, not in pyramidal form

The following example describes a military decision support system, but the architecture and underlying conceptual idea are transferable to other application domains:

- The value chain starts with data quality describing the information within the underlying command and control systems.
- Information quality tracks the completeness, correctness, currency, consistency and precision of the data items and information statements available.
- Knowledge quality deals with procedural knowledge and information embedded in the command and control system such as templates for adversary forces, assumptions about entities such as ranges and weapons, and doctrinal assumptions, often coded as rules.
- Awareness quality measures the degree of using the information and knowledge embedded within the command and control system. Awareness is explicitly placed in the cognitive domain.

By the introduction of a common operational picture, data are put into context, which leads to information instead of data. The next step, which is enabled by service-oriented web-based infrastructures (but not yet operationally used), is the use of models and simulations for decision support. Simulation systems are the prototype for procedural knowledge, which is the basis for knowledge quality. Finally, using intelligent software agents to continually observe the battle sphere, apply models and simulations to analyze what is going on, to monitor the execution of a plan, and to do all the tasks necessary to make the decision maker aware of what is going on, command and control systems could even support situational awareness, the level in the value chain traditionally limited to pure cognitive methods.

== History ==
Danny P. Wallace, a professor of library and information science, explained that the origin of the DIKW pyramid is uncertain:

The presentation of the relationships among data, information, knowledge, and sometimes wisdom in a hierarchical arrangement has been part of the language of information science for many years. Although it is uncertain when and by whom those relationships were first presented, the ubiquity of the notion of a hierarchy is embedded in the use of the acronym DIKW as a shorthand representation for the data-to-information-to-knowledge-to-wisdom transformation.

Many authors think that the idea of the DIKW relationship originated from two lines in the poem "Choruses", by T. S. Eliot, that appeared in the pageant play The Rock, in 1934:

Where is the wisdom we have lost in knowledge?
Where is the knowledge we have lost in information?

=== Knowledge, intelligence, and wisdom ===
In 1927, Clarence W. Barron addressed his employees at Dow Jones & Company on the hierarchy: "Knowledge, Intelligence and Wisdom".

=== Data, information, knowledge ===
In 1955, English-American economist and educator Kenneth Boulding presented a variation on the hierarchy consisting of "signals, messages, information, and knowledge". However, "[t]he first author to distinguish among data, information, and knowledge and to also employ the term 'knowledge management' may have been American educator Nicholas L. Henry", in a 1974 journal article.

=== Data, information, knowledge, wisdom ===
Other early versions (prior to 1982) of the hierarchy that refer to a data tier include those of Chinese-American geographer Yi-Fu Tuan and sociologist-historian Daniel Bell.. In 1980, Irish-born engineer Mike Cooley invoked the same hierarchy in his critique of automation and computerization, in his book Architect or Bee?: The Human / Technology Relationship.

Thereafter, in 1987, Czechoslovakia-born educator Milan Zeleny mapped the components of the hierarchy to knowledge forms: know-nothing, know-what, know-how, and know-why. Zeleny "has frequently been credited with proposing the [representation of DIKW as a pyramid ]... although he actually made no reference to any such graphical model."

The hierarchy appears again in a 1988 address to the International Society for General Systems Research, by American organizational theorist Russell Ackoff, published in 1989. Subsequent authors and textbooks cite Ackoff's as the "original articulation" of the hierarchy or otherwise credit Ackoff with its proposal. Ackoff's version of the model includes an understanding tier (as Adler had, before him), interposed between knowledge and wisdom. Although Ackoff did not present the hierarchy graphically, he has also been credited with its representation as a pyramid.

In 1989, Bell Labs veteran Robert W. Lucky wrote about the four-tier "information hierarchy" in the form of a pyramid in his book Silicon Dreams. In the same year as Ackoff presented his address, information scientist Anthony Debons and colleagues introduced an extended hierarchy, with "events", "symbols", and "rules and formulations" tiers ahead of data. In 1994 Nathan Shedroff presented the DIKW hierarchy in an information design context.

Jennifer Rowley noted in 2007 that as of that date there was "little reference to wisdom" in discussions of the DIKW in published college textbooks, and she at times did not include wisdom in her own discussion of her research. Meanwhile, Chaim Zins' extensive primary research analysis conceptualizing data, information, and knowledge in that same year makes no explicit comment regarding wisdom, although citations included by Zins do make mention of the term (e.g., Dodig-Crnković, Ess, and Wormell cited therein),

== Definitions and conceptions of the four DIKW components ==
In 2013, Baskarada and Koronios attempted a relatively thorough review of the definitions of individual components, to that date.

=== Data ===
In the context of DIKW-type models, data is conceived, per Zins' 2007 formulation, as being composed of symbols or signs, representing stimuli or signals, that, in Rowley words (in 2007), are "of no use until ... in a usable (that is, relevant) form". Zeleny characterized this non-usable characteristic of data as "know-nothing".

The view in 2007 was that in some cases, data are understood to refer not only to symbols, but also to signals or stimuli referred to by such symbols—what Zins terms "subjective data". "[U]niversal data", on the other hand, for Rowley, are "the product of "observation", while subjective data are the observations. This distinction is often obscured in definitions of data in terms of "facts".

==== Data as fact ====
In Henry's early formulation of a hierarchy, data was simply defined as "merely raw facts", Intervening texts define data as "chunks of facts about the state of the world", and "material facts", respectively. Rowley, following her 2007 study of DIKW definitions given in textbooks, separately characterizes data "as being discrete, objective facts or observations, which (are unorganized and unprocessed and therefore have no meaning or value because of lack of context and interpretation." Cleveland does not include an explicit data tier, but defines information as "the sum total of ... facts and ideas".

Insofar as facts have as a fundamental property that they are true, have objective reality, or otherwise can be verified, such definitions would preclude false, meaningless, and nonsensical data from the DIKW model, such that the principle of garbage in, garbage out would not be accounted for under DIKW.

==== Data as signal ====
In the subjective domain, per Zins' 2007 work, data are conceived of as "sensory stimuli, which we perceive through our senses", or "signal readings", including "sensor and/or sensory readings of light, sound, smell, taste, and touch". Others have argued that what Zins calls subjective data actually count as a "signal" tier (as had Boulding), which precedes data in the DIKW chain.

American information scientist Glynn Harmon defined data as "one or more kinds of energy waves or particles (light, heat, sound, force, electromagnetic) selected by a conscious organism or intelligent agent on the basis of a preexisting frame or inferential mechanism in the organism or agent" (e.g., Harmon, as cited by Zins)

The meaning of sensory stimuli may also be thought of as subjective data; as Zins stated in 2007, information

is the meaning of these sensory stimuli (i.e., the empirical perception). For example, the noises that I hear are data. The meaning of these noises (e.g., a running car engine) is information. Still, there is another alternative as to how to define these two concepts—which seems even better. Data are sense stimuli, or their meaning (i.e., the empirical perception). Accordingly, in the example above, the loud noises, as well as the perception of a running car engine, are data.

Likewise, per that work of Zins, subjective data, if understood in this way, would be comparable to knowledge by acquaintance, in that it is based on direct experience of stimuli; however, unlike knowledge by acquaintance, as described by Bertrand Russell and others, the subjective domain is "not related to ... truthfulness".

Whether Zins' alternate definition would hold would be a function of whether "the running of a car engine" is understood as an objective fact or as a contextual interpretation.

==== Data as symbol ====
Whether the DIKW definition of data is deemed to include Zins's 2007 view of subjective data (with or without meaning), data is somemwhat consistently defined to include "symbols", or, per Zins, "sets of signs that represent empirical stimuli or perceptions", in Rowley's words (writing in that same year), of "a property of an object, an event or of their environment". Data, in this sense, as described by Liew, likewise in 2007, are "recorded (captured or stored) symbols", including "words (text and/or verbal), numbers, diagrams, and images (still and/or video), which are the building blocks of communication", the purpose of which "is to record activities or situations, to attempt to capture the true picture or real event," such that "all data are historical, unless used for illustrative purposes, such as forecasting."

Boulding's version of DIKW-type models explicitly named the level below the information tier message, distinguishing it from an underlying signal tier. Debons and colleagues reverse this relationship, identifying an explicit symbol tier as one of several levels underlying data.

Zins argues in the same work that, for most of those surveyed, data "are characterized as phenomena in the universal domain... Apparently," clarifies Zins, "it is more useful to relate to the data, information, and knowledge as sets of signs rather than as meaning and its building blocks".

=== Information ===
"Classically," states Gamble's 2007 text, "information is defined as data that are endowed with meaning and purpose." In the context of DIKW, as presented by Rowley in 2007, information meets the definition for knowledge by description ("information is contained in descriptions"), and is differentiated from data in that it is "useful". In her words, "[i]nformation is inferred from data", in the process of answering interrogative questions (e.g., Ackoff's "who", "what", "where", "how many", "when") thereby making the data useful for "decisions and/or action".

==== Structural v. functional information ====
Rowley, following her 2007 review of how DIKW is presented in textbooks, describes information as "organized or structured data, which has been processed in such a way that the information now has relevance for a specific purpose or context, and is therefore meaningful, valuable, useful and relevant." Note that this definition contrasts with Rowley's separate characterization of Ackoff's definitions, wherein "[t]he difference between data and information is structural, not functional."

In his formulation of the hierarchy, Henry defined information as "data that changes us", this being a functional, rather than structural, distinction between data and information. Meanwhile, Cleveland, who did not refer to a data level in his version of DIKW, described information as "the sum total of all the facts and ideas that are available to be known by somebody at a given moment in time".

American educator Bob Boiko is more obscure, defining information only as "matter-of-fact".

==== Symbolic v. subjective information ====
Information may be conceived of in DIKW-type models as universal, per Zins writing in 2007, existing as symbols and signs; subjective, the meaning to which symbols attach; or both. Examples from of information as both symbol and meaning, per Zins analysis based on the work of others, include:

- American information scientist Anthony Debons's characterization of information as representing "a state of awareness (consciousness) and the physical manifestations they form", such that "[i]nformation, as a phenomenon, represents both a process and a product; a cognitive/affective state, and the physical counterpart (product of) the cognitive/affective state."
- Danish information scientist Hanne Albrechtsen's description of information as "related to meaning or human intention", either as "the contents of databases, the web, etc." (italics added) or "the meaning of statements as they are intended by the speaker/writer and understood/misunderstood by the listener/reader."

Zeleny formerly described information as "know-what", but has since refined this to differentiate between "what to have or to possess" (information) and "what to do, act or carry out" (wisdom). To this conceptualization of information, he also adds "why is", as distinct from "why do" (another aspect of wisdom). Zeleny further argues that there is no such thing as explicit knowledge, but rather that knowledge, once made explicit in symbolic form, becomes information.

=== Knowledge ===
American philosophers John Dewey and Arthur Bentley, in their 1949 book Knowing and the Known, argued that "knowledge" is "a vague word", and presented a view, distinct but foreshadowing DIKW-type models, that outlined nineteen "terminological guide-posts". Other definitions may refer to information having been processed, organized or structured in some way, or else as being applied or put into action. As such, the knowledge component of DIKW-type models is generally understood to be a concept elusive and difficult to define. As well, definitions of knowledge by those who study DIKW-type models differ from that used by epistemology.

Per Rowley, writing in 2007, the DIKW view is that "knowledge is defined with reference to information." Zins, also writing in 2007, has suggested that knowledge, being subjective rather than universal, is not the subject of study in information science, and that it is often defined in propositional terms, while Zeleny has asserted that to capture knowledge in symbolic form is to make it into information, i.e., that "All knowledge is tacit".

"One of the most frequently quoted definitions" of knowledge captures some of the various ways in which it has been defined by others:

Knowledge is a fluid mix of framed experience, values, contextual information, expert insight and grounded intuition that provides an environment and framework for evaluating and incorporating new experiences and information. It originates and is applied in the minds of knowers. In organizations it often becomes embedded not only in documents and repositories but also in organizational routines, processes, practices and norms.

==== Knowledge as processed ====
Mirroring the description of information as "organized or structured data", knowledge was described, as of 2007, as:

- "synthesis of multiple sources of information over time"...
- "organization and processing to convey understanding, experience [and] accumulated learning"... or
- "a mix of contextual information, values, experience and rules".

One of Boulding's definitions for knowledge had been "a mental structure" and Cleveland described knowledge as "the result of somebody applying the refiner's fire to [information], selecting and organizing what is useful to somebody". A 2007 text describes knowledge as "information connected in relationships".

==== Knowledge as procedural ====
Zeleny defines knowledge as "know-how" (i.e., procedural knowledge), and also "know-who" and "know-when", each gained through "practical experience". "Knowledge ... brings forth from the background of experience a coherent and self-consistent set of coordinated actions.". Further, implicitly holding information as descriptive, Zeleny declares that "Knowledge is action, not a description of action."

Ackoff, likewise, described knowledge as the "application of data and information", which "answers 'how' questions", that is, in Rowley's view, "know-how".

Meanwhile, as described by Rowley in 2007, textbooks discussing DIKW were found to describe knowledge variously in terms of experience, skill, expertise or capability, for instance as

- "study and experience"...
- "a mix of contextual information, expert opinion, skills and experience"...
- "information combined with understanding and capability"... or
- "perception, skills, training, common sense and experience".

Businessmen James Chisholm and Greg Warman, writing in that same year, characterized knowledge simply as "doing things right".

==== Knowledge as propositional ====
In Rowley's 2007 views, knowledge can be described as "belief structuring" and "internalization with reference to cognitive frameworks". One definition given by Boulding for knowledge was "the subjective 'perception of the world and one's place in it'", while Zeleny's said that knowledge "should refer to an observer's distinction of 'objects' (wholes, unities)".

Zins, likewise, wrote in 2007 that knowledge is described in propositional terms, as justifiable beliefs (subjective domain, akin to tacit knowledge), and sometimes also as signs that represent such beliefs (universal/collective domain, akin to explicit knowledge). Zeleny has rejected the idea of explicit knowledge (as in Zins' universal knowledge), arguing that once made symbolic, knowledge becomes information. Boiko appears to echo this sentiment, in his claim that "knowledge and wisdom can be information".

In the subjective domain, per Zins 2007 work, knowledge is

a thought in the individual's mind, which is characterized by the individual's justifiable belief that it is true. It can be empirical and non-empirical, as in the case of logical and mathematical knowledge (e.g., "every triangle has three sides"), religious knowledge (e.g., "God exists"), philosophical knowledge (e.g., "Cogito ergo sum"), and the like. Note that knowledge is the content of a thought in the individual's mind, which is characterized by the individual's justifiable belief that it is true, while "knowing" is a state of mind which is characterized by the three conditions: (1) the individual believe[s] that it is true, (2) S/he can justify it, and (3) It is true, or it [appears] to be true.

The distinction here between subjective knowledge and subjective information is that subjective knowledge is characterized by justifiable belief, where subjective information is a type of knowledge concerning the meaning of data.

Boiko implied that knowledge was both open to rational discourse and justification, when he defined knowledge as "a matter of dispute".

=== Wisdom ===
Although commonly included as a level in DIKW-type models, Rowley noted in 2007 that, in discussions of the DIKW-type models, "there is limited reference to wisdom". Boiko appears to have dismissed wisdom, characterizing it as "non-material".

Ackoff refers to understanding as an "appreciation of 'why'", and wisdom as "evaluated understanding", where understanding is posited as a discrete layer between knowledge and wisdom. Adler had previously also included an understanding tier, while other authors have depicted understanding as a dimension in relation to which DIKW is plotted.

Cleveland described wisdom simply as "integrated knowledge—information made super-useful". Other authors have characterized wisdom as "knowing the right things to do" and "the ability to make sound judgments and decisions apparently without thought". Wisdom involves using knowledge for the greater good; because of this, wisdom is described as being deeper and more uniquely human, and requires a sense of good and bad, of right and wrong, of the ethical and unethical.

Zeleny described wisdom as "know-why", but later refined his definitions, so as to differentiate "why do" (wisdom) from "why is" (information), and expanding his definition to include a form of know-what ("what to do, act or carry out"). And, as noted by Nikhil Sharma, Zeleny has argued for a tier to the model beyond wisdom, termed "enlightenment".

== Criticisms ==
Rafael Capurro, a philosopher based in Germany, argues—per Zins 2007 description—that data is an abstraction, that information refers to "the act of communicating meaning", and knowledge "is the event of meaning selection of a (psychic/social) system from its 'world' on the basis of communication". As such, any impression of a logical hierarchy between these concepts "is a fairytale".

One objection offered by Zins: while knowledge may be an exclusively cognitive phenomenon, the difficulty in pointing to a given fact as being distinctively information or knowledge, but not both, makes DIKW-type models unworkable, for instance, he asks

is Albert Einstein's famous equation "E = mc^{2}" (which is printed on my computer screen, and is definitely separated from any human mind) information or knowledge? Is "2 + 2 = 4" information or knowledge?

Alternatively, in Zins' 2007 analysis referencing Roberto Poli, information and knowledge might be seen as synonyms. In answer to these criticisms, Zins argues that, subjectivist and empiricist philosophy aside, "the three fundamental concepts of data, information, and knowledge and the relations among them, as they are perceived by leading scholars in the information science academic community", have meanings open to distinct definitions. Rowley, in her 2007 discussion, echoes this point in arguing that, where definitions of knowledge may disagree, "[t]hese various perspectives all take as their point of departure the relationship between data, information and knowledge."

Information processing theory argues that the physical world is made of information itself. Under this definition, data is either made up of or synonymous with physical information. It is unclear, however, whether information as it is conceived in the DIKW model would be considered derivative from physical-information/data or synonymous with physical information. In the former case, the DIKW model is open to the fallacy of equivocation. In the latter, the data tier of the DIKW model is preempted by an assertion of neutral monism.

Educator Martin Frické has published an article critiquing the DIKW hierarchy, in which he argues that the model is based on "dated and unsatisfactory philosophical positions of operationalism and inductivism", that information and knowledge are both weak knowledge, and that wisdom is the "possession and use of wide practical knowledge.

David Weinberger argues that although the DIKW pyramid appears to be a logical and straight-forward progression, this is incorrect. "What looks like a logical progression is actually a desperate cry for help." He points out there is a discontinuity between Data and Information (which are stored in computers), versus Knowledge and Wisdom (which are human endeavours). This suggests that the DIKW pyramid is too simplistic in representing how these concepts interact. "...Knowledge is not determined by information, for it is the knowing process that first decides which information is relevant, and how it is to be used."

== See also ==
- Bloom's taxonomy – Classification system in education
- Higher-order thinking – Concept in education and education reform
- Intelligence cycle – Stages of intelligence information processing
- Ladder of inference – Metaphorical model of cognition and action by Chris Argyris
- Model of hierarchical complexity – Framework for scoring a behavior's complexity
- Maslow's hierarchy of needs – Theory of developmental psychology, a similar graphic in the field of psychology
- Inverted pyramid (journalism), a metaphor used by journalists and writers to prioritise and structure the most newsworthy info and important details over general info
