= Integrative complexity =

Research psychometric

Integrative complexity is a research psychometric that refers to the degree to which thinking and reasoning involve the recognition and integration of multiple perspectives and possibilities and their interrelated contingencies.

Integrative complexity is a measure of the intellectual style used by individuals or groups in processing information, problem-solving, and decision making. Complexity looks at the structure of one's thoughts, while ignoring the contents. It is scorable from almost any verbal materials: written materials, such as books, articles, letters, and transcript; as well as audio-visual material.

The measure of integrative complexity has two components: differentiation and integration. Differentiation refers to the perception of different dimensions when considering an issue. Integration refers to the recognition of cognitive connections among differentiated dimensions or perspectives.

In a 1988 study it was demonstrated that changes in integrative complexity could be potentially used in international violence prediction. These findings were seen again in a 1995 article by Karen Guttieri, Michael Wallace, and Peter Suedfeld looking at the Cuban Missile Crisis.

== Components ==
=== Evaluative differentiation ===
Evaluative differentiation involves the acknowledgement that reasonable people can view any given event differently and that making a decision involves balancing any legitimate competing interests. In contrast, thinking in an evaluatively un-differentiated manner involves thinking rigidly and refusing to compromise or consider any alternative.

=== Conceptual integration ===
Conceptual integration uses reasoning that builds upon earlier evaluative differentiations. It is commonly used to help give context to previous evaluative differentiations. For example, it could take the form of explaining why someone may view an event in a different way or in what ways a compromise could be made between conflicting values.

== Examples ==
=== Conflict resolution ===
Integratively complex thinkers are better able to reach mutually advantageous solutions in mixed-motive games than integratively simple thinkers. Declines in integrative complexity in diplomacy during times of crises is also a lead indicator of war, while increases in integrative complexity is a lead indicator of reaching compromise agreements that avert war.

=== Cognitive bias ===
Thinking in an integratively complex way can reduce or even eliminate various judgmental biases. Such biases include belief perseverance, the over-attribution effect, and overconfidence.

== Downsides ==
Integrative complexity can also have drawbacks. Thinking in an integratively complex way, for example, makes one more prone to suffering from the dilution effect. Integratively complex thinkers are also more prone to defer to others or put off making a decision when faced with difficult cost–benefit decisions. Additionally, while integratively complex thinkers are more likely to reach a mutually advantageous compromise when dealing with reasonable opponents, unreasonable opponents are much more likely to be able to exploit them.

== See also ==
- Cognitive development – Field of study in neuroscience and psychology
- Cognitive dissonance – Mental phenomenon of holding contradictory beliefs
- Higher-order thinking – Concept in education and education reform
- Insight – Understanding of a specific cause and effect in a specific context
- Metacognition – Self-awareness about thinking, higher-order thinking skills
- Model of hierarchical complexity – Framework for scoring a behavior's complexity
- Closure (psychology) – Psychological term for one's need for an answer to something
- Need for cognition – Psychology concept
- Openness to experience – Personality trait
- Structure of observed learning outcome – Model of levels of increasing complexity in understanding
- Thesis, antithesis, synthesis – Method of reasoning via argumentation and contradiction
