= Personal development =

Activities that develop a person's capabilities and potential

Field overview
- Also known as: Self-help, self-improvement
- Core concepts: Self-awareness, Identity, Talents, Self-actualization
- Major influences: Psychology, Philosophy, Education

Components
- Techniques: Mentoring, Coaching, Goal setting
- Originators: Abraham Maslow, Carl Rogers, Alfred Adler

Outcomes
- Primary goals: Quality of life, realization of dreams and aspirations

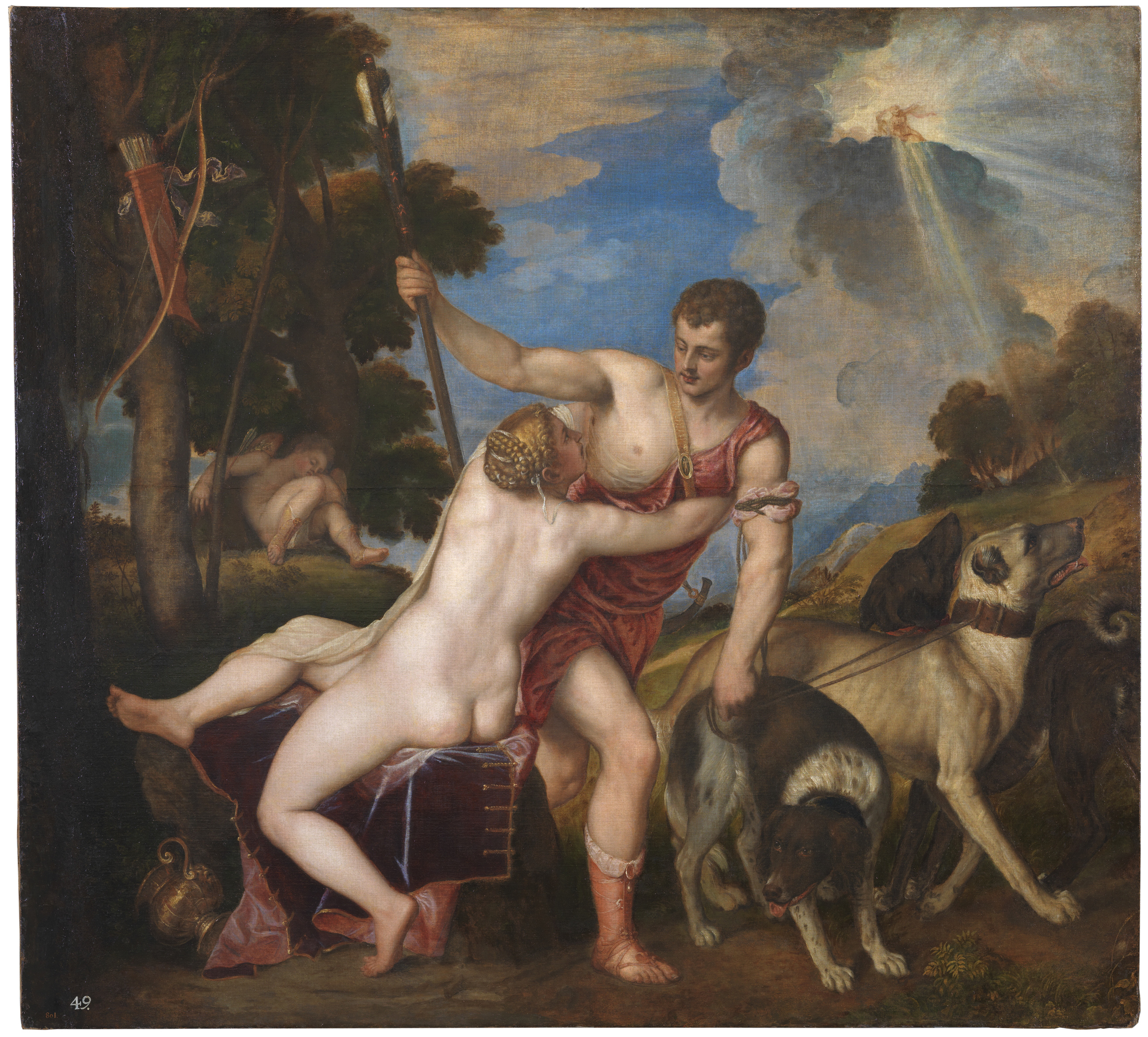
Painting depicting Venus and Adonis, the Greek deities of beauty, sometimes used as symbols for personal development

Personal development or self-improvement consists of activities that develops a person's capabilities and potential, enhance quality of life, and facilitate the realization of dreams and aspirations. Personal development may take place over the course of an individual's entire lifespan and is not limited to one stage of a person's life. It is not restricted to self-help and can include official and informal actions for developing others in roles such as a teacher, guide, counselor, manager, coach, or mentor.

When personal development takes place in the context of institutions, it refers to the methods, programs, tools, techniques, and assessment systems offered to support positive adult development at the individual level in organizations. More recently, it is recognised that workplaces should be more proactive in promoting personal development. Bob Aubrey (Founder & Chair of the Advisory Board of the ASEAN Human Development Organisation) contends "that human development should be integral to policies and practices in the workplace"

== Overview ==
Among other things, personal development may include the following activities:

- Social entrepreneurship or civic engagement
- Participating in festivals, conferences, or conventions
- Improving self-awareness
- Improving self-knowledge
- Improving skills and/or learning new ones
- Building or renewing identity/self-esteem
- Developing strengths or talents
- Improving a career
- Identifying or improving potential
- Building employability or (alternatively) human capital
- Enhancing lifestyle and/or the quality of life and time management calculating the return on time invested.
- Improving health
- Improving wealth or social status
- Fulfilling aspirations
- Initiating a life enterprise
- Defining and executing personal development plans (PDPs)
- Improving social relations or emotional intelligence
- Spiritual identity development and recognition
- Character building
- Developing personal attributes and rewiring the brains neuro-pathways
- Sustaining growth through habit maintenance and relapse prevention

A distinction can be made between personal development and personal growth. Although similar, both concepts portray different ideas. Personal development specifies the focus of the "what" that is evolving, while personal growth entails a much more holistic view of broader concepts including morals and values being developed.

Recent scholarship has noted parallels between personal-development frameworks and structured therapeutic models used in psychology, which also emphasize goal setting, staged progress, and feedback systems to support sustained change.

Personal development can also include developing other people's skills and personalities. This can happen through roles such as those of a teacher or mentor, either through a personal competency (such as the alleged skill of certain managers in developing the potential of employees) or through a professional service (such as providing training, assessment, or coaching).

Beyond improving oneself and developing others, "personal development" labels a field of practice and research:

- As a field of practice, personal development includes personal-development methods, learning programs, assessment systems, tools, and techniques.
- As a field of research, personal-development topics appear in psychology journals, education research, management journals and books, and human-development economics.

Any sort of development—whether economic, political, biological, organizational or personal—requires a framework if one wishes to know whether a change has actually occurred. In the case of personal development, an individual often functions as the primary judge of improvement or of regression, but the validation of objective improvement requires assessment using standard criteria.

Personal-Development frameworks may include:

- Goals or benchmarks that define the end-points
- Strategies or plans for reaching goals
- Measurement and assessment of progress, levels or stages that define milestones along a development path
- A feedback system to provide information on changes

== As an industry ==
Personal development as an industry has several business-relationship formats of operating. The main ways are business-to-consumer and business-to-business. However, there have been two new ways emerge: consumer-to-business and consumer-to-consumer. The personal development market had a global market size of 38.28 billion dollars in 2019.

=== Business-to-consumer market ===
A wide array of personal development products are available to individuals. Examples include self-help books; education technology, neuroenhancement, and experiential learning (instructor-led training, motivational speeches, seminars, social or spiritual retreats).

- Domains
  - Higher education, cognitive training
  - Personal finance
  - Weight loss, physical fitness, nutrition, and beauty enhancement
  - Large-group awareness training
  - Sensory deprivation
  - Time-management
  - Yoga
  - Martial arts
  - Initiation ceremonies
  - Meditation
  - Asceticism
- General methods of personal development also include:
  - Life coaching or counseling
  - Recommendation systems
  - Nootropics, such as caffeinated drinks
  - Brain computer interface
  - Virtual assistant

=== Business-to-business market ===
Some consulting firms such as DDI and FranklinCovey specialize in personal development, but as of 2009 generalist firms operating in the fields of human resources, recruitment and organizational strategy—such as Hewitt, Watson Wyatt Worldwide, Hay Group, McKinsey, Boston Consulting Group, and Korn/Ferry—have entered what they perceive as a growing market, not to mention smaller firms and self-employed professionals who provide consulting, training and coaching.

== Origins ==
Major religions—such as the age-old Abrahamic and Indian religions—as well as 20th-century New Age philosophies have variously used practices such as prayer, music, dance, singing, chanting, poetry, writing, sports and martial arts.

Michel Foucault describes in Care of the Self the techniques of epimelia used in ancient Greece and Rome, which included dieting, exercise, sexual abstinence, contemplation, prayer, and confession—some of which also became practices within different branches of Christianity.

Wushu and tai chi utilize traditional Chinese techniques, including breathing and qi exercises, meditation, martial arts, as well as practices linked to traditional Chinese medicine, such as dieting, massage, and acupuncture.

Two individual ancient philosophical traditions: those of Aristotle (Western tradition) and Confucius (Eastern tradition) stand out and contribute to the worldwide view of "personal development" in the 21st century. Elsewhere anonymous or named founders of schools of self-development appear endemic—note the traditions of the Indian sub-continent in this regard.

=== South Asian traditions ===
Some ancient Indians aspired to "beingness, wisdom and happiness".

Paul Oliver suggests that the popularity of Indian traditions for a personal developer may lie in their relative lack of prescriptive doctrine.

=== Islamic personal development ===
Khurram Murad describes that personal development in Islam is to work towards eternal life in Jannuh. There are many avenues in the journey to paradise, such as devoted practicing of the laws of the Quran and Sunnah, such as optimized service towards the self and others. Sincere worship of Allah is the foundation for self-discovery and self-development. Allah has provided ways to help those striving towards eternal life, including staying away from things of the world. These worldly things can distract those away from the path to paradise. It does not mean worldly success is inherently disruptive but can become so when spiritual beliefs do not align with the Sunnah. In the end, paradise will bring satisfaction to those working on their personal development because of the pleasure that comes from Allah.

=== Aristotle and the Western tradition ===
The Greek philosopher Aristotle (384 BC – 322 BC) wrote Nicomachean Ethics, in which he defined personal development as a category of phronesis or practical wisdom, where the practice of virtues (arête) leads to eudaimonia, commonly translated as "happiness" but more accurately understood as "human flourishing" or "living well". Aristotle continues to influence the Western concept of personal development to this day, particularly in the economics of human development and in positive psychology.

=== Confucius and the East Asian tradition ===
In Chinese tradition, Confucius (around 551 BC – 479 BC) founded an ongoing philosophy. His ideas continue to influence family values, education and personnel management in China and East Asia. In his Great Learning Confucius wrote:

The ancients who wished to illustrate illustrious virtue throughout the kingdom first ordered well their own states. Wishing to order well their states, they first regulated their families. Wishing to regulate their families, they first cultivated their persons. Wishing to cultivate their persons, they first rectified their hearts. Wishing to rectify their hearts, they first sought to be sincere in their thoughts. Wishing to be sincere in their thoughts, they first extended to the utmost their knowledge. Such extension of knowledge lay in the investigation of things.

In contemporary China, personal development remain a salient priority in social life, and is shaped by diverse traditions, including Confucianism, Daoism, and Buddhism, as well as modern influences such as communist ideas of citizenship and capitalist conceptions of human capital. Young adults in particular must navigate different social roles and values as they seek to become socioeconomically competent citizens.

== Contexts ==
=== Psychology ===
Psychology became linked to personal development in the early 20th century starting with the research efforts of Alfred Adler (1870–1937) and Carl Jung (1875–1961).

Adler refused to limit psychology to analysis alone. He made the important point that aspirations focus on looking forward and do not limit themselves to unconscious drives or to childhood experiences. He also originated the concepts of lifestyle (1929—he defined "lifestyle" as an individual's characteristic approach to life, in facing problems) and of self-image, as a concept that influenced management under the heading of work-life balance, also known as the equilibrium between a person's career and personal life.

Carl Gustav Jung made contributions to personal development with his concept of individuation, which he saw as the drive of the individual to achieve the wholeness and balance of the Self.

Daniel Levinson (1920–1994) developed Jung's early concept of "life stages" and included a sociological perspective. Levinson proposed that personal development comes under the influence—throughout life—of aspirations, which he called "the Dream":

Whatever the nature of his Dream, a young man has the developmental task of giving it greater definition and finding ways to live it out. It makes a great difference in his growth whether his initial life structure is consonant with and infused by the Dream, or opposed to it. If the Dream remains unconnected to his life it may simply die, and with it his sense of aliveness and purpose.

Research on success in reaching goals, as undertaken by Albert Bandura (1925–2021), suggested that self-efficacy best explains why people with the same level of knowledge and skills get very different results. Having self-efficacy leads to an increased likelihood of success. According to Bandura self-confidence functions as a powerful predictor of success because:

1. It causes you to expect to succeed
2. It allows you take risks and set challenging goals
3. It helps you keep trying if at first you do not succeed
4. It helps you control emotions and fears when life may throw more difficult things your way

In 1998 Martin Seligman won election to a one-year term as President of the American Psychological Association and proposed a new focus: on healthy individuals rather than on pathology (he created the "positive psychology" current)

We have discovered that there is a set of human strengths that are the most likely buffers against mental illness: courage, optimism, interpersonal skill, work ethic, hope, honesty and perseverance. Much of the task of prevention will be to create a science of human strength whose mission will be to foster these virtues in young people.

— Martin E.P. Seligman, Positive Psychology: The Scientific and Practical Explorations of Human Strengths, Part 1, Chapter 1

Carl Rogers proposed a theory about humanistic psychology called Self Concept. This concept consisted of two ideas of the self. The first idea is the ideal self which describes the person we want to be. The second one is the real self which is the objective view of one self and who we really are. Rogers emphasized that healthy development is when the real self and the ideal self are accurate. Incongruence is what Rogers described to be when the real self and the ideal self are not accurate in their viewings. The ideal self is not lowered in order to compensate for the real self, but the real self is lifted by the ideal self in order to achieve healthy development.

Lasting personal development is only achieved through meaningful and lasting accomplishments. Viktor Frankl emphasized this by stating "Genuine and lasting well-being is the result of a "life well-lived". In an article written by Ugur, H., Constantinescu, P.M., & Stevens, M.J. (2015) they described that society has taught us to create positive illusions that give the appearance of positive development but are only effective in the short term. Additionally, they give two examples of personal development. The first is hedonic well-being which is the pursuit of pleasurable experiences that lead to increased personal happiness. The second is eudaimonic well-being which is living life by making choices that are congruent with authentic being.

==== Social psychology ====
Social psychology heavily emphasizes and focuses on human behavior and how individuals interact with others in society. Infants develop socially by creating trusting and dependent relationships with others—namely parental figures. They learn how to act and treat other people based on the example of parental figures and other adults they interact with often. Toddlers further develop social skills. Additionally, they begin to gain a desire for autonomy and grow more and more independent as they grow older. The balance of social involvement and autonomy varies per person, but normally autonomous behavior increases with age. Some studies suggest that selfishness begins to diminish, and prosocial behaviors increase, between the ages of six years old to twelve years old. Additionally, the years of adulthood are times of development—self-actualization, relational and occupational development, loss, and coping skills development, etc.—affected by those around us: parents, co-workers, romantic partners, and children. Social psychology draws from many other psychological theories and principles yet views them through a lens of social interaction.

==== Psychodynamic psychology ====
The psychodynamic view of personal development varies from other perspectives. Namely, that the development of our traits, personalities, and thinking patterns are predominantly subconscious. Psychodynamic theory suggests these subconscious changes—which emerge as external actions—are formed from suppressed sexual and aggressive urges and other internalized conflicts. Sigmund Freud and other notable psychodynamic theorists postulate that these repressed cognitions form during childhood and adolescence. Conscious development would then be "digging up" these repressed memories and feelings. Once repressed memories and emotions are discovered, an individual can sift through them and receive healthy closure. Much, if not all, of conscious development occurs with the aid of a trained psychodynamic therapist.

==== Cognitive-behavioral psychology ====
Cognitive-behavioral views on personal development follow traditional patterns of personal development: behavior modification, cognitive reframing, and successive approximation being some of the more notable techniques. An individual is seen as in control of their actions and their thoughts, though self-mastery is required. With behavior modification, individuals will develop personal skills and traits by altering their behavior independent of their emotions. For example, a person may feel intense anger but would still behave in a positive manner. They are able to suppress their emotions and act in a more socially acceptable way. The accumulation of these efforts would change the person into a more patient individual. Cognitive reframing plays an instrumental role in personal development. Cognitive-behavioral psychologists believe that how we view events is more important than the event itself. Thus, if one can view negative events in beneficial ways, they can progress and develop with fewer setbacks. Successive approximation—or shaping—most closely aligns with personal development. Successive approximation is when one desires a final result but takes incremental steps to achieve the result. Normally, each successful step towards the final goal is rewarded until the goal is achieved. Personal development, if it is to be long-lasting, is achieved incrementally.

==== Educational psychology ====
Educational psychology focuses on the human learning experience: learning and teaching methods, aptitude testing, and so on. Educational psychology seeks to further personal development by increasing one's ability to learn, retain information, and apply knowledge to real-world experiences. If one is able to increase efficacious learning, they are better equipped for personal development.

=== Early education ===
Education offers children the opportunity to begin personal development at a young age. The curriculum taught at school must be carefully planned and managed in order to successfully promote personal development. Providing an environment for children that allows for quality social relationships to be made and clearly communicated objectives and aims is key to their development. If early education fails to meet these qualifications, it can greatly stunt development in children, hindering their success in education as well as society. They can fall behind in development compared to peers of the same age group.

=== Higher education ===
During the 1960s a large increase in the number of students on American campuses led to research on the personal development needs of undergraduate students. Arthur Chickering defined seven vectors of personal development for young adults during their undergraduate years:

1. Developing competence
2. Managing emotions
3. Achieving autonomy and interdependence
4. Developing mature interpersonal relationships
5. Establishing personal identity
6. Developing purpose
7. Developing integrity

In the UK, personal development took a central place in university policy in 1997 when the Dearing Report declared that universities should go beyond academic teaching to provide students with personal development. In 2001 a Quality Assessment Agency for UK universities produced guidelines for universities to enhance personal development as:

- a structured and supported process undertaken by an individual to reflect upon their own learning, performance and/or achievement and to plan for their personal, educational and career development;
- objectives related explicitly to student development; to improve the capacity of students to understand what and how they are learning, and to review, plan and take responsibility for their own learning

In the 1990s, business schools began to set up specific personal-development programs for leadership and career orientation and in 1998 the European Foundation for Management Development set up the EQUIS accreditation system which specified that personal development must form part of the learning process through internships, working on team projects and going abroad for work or exchange programs.

The first personal development certification required for business school graduation originated in 2002 as a partnership between Metizo, a personal-development consulting firm, and the Euromed Management School in Marseilles: students must not only complete assignments but also demonstrate self-awareness and achievement of personal-development competencies.

As an academic department, personal development as a specific discipline is often associated with business schools. As an area of research, personal development draws on links to other academic disciplines:

- Education for questions of learning and assessment
- Psychology for motivation and personality
- Sociology for identity and social networks
- Economics for human capital and economic value
- Philosophy for ethics and self-reflection

=== Developmental activities ===
Personal development can include gaining self-awareness of the course of one's lifespan. It includes multiple definitions but is different from self knowledge. Self-awareness is more in depth and explores the conscious and unconscious aspects of ourselves. We are able to gain self-awareness through socializing and communicating according to the social behaviorism view. Self-awareness can also be a positive intrapersonal experience where one is able to reflect during a moment of action or past actions. Becoming more self aware can help us to increase our emotional intelligence, leadership skills, and performance.

=== The workplace ===
Abraham Maslow (1908–1970), proposed a hierarchy of needs with self actualization at the top, defined as "the desire to become more and more what one is, to become everything that one is capable of becoming". In other words, self actualization is the ambition to become a better version of oneself, to become everything one is capable of being.

Since Maslow himself believed that only a small minority of people self-actualize—he estimated one percent—his hierarchy of needs had the consequence that organizations came to regard self-actualization or personal development as occurring at the top of the organizational pyramid, while openness and job security in the workplace would fulfill the needs of the mass of employees.

As organizations and labor markets became more global, responsibility for development shifted from the company to the individual. In 1999 management thinker Peter Drucker wrote in the Harvard Business Review:

We live in an age of unprecedented opportunity: if you've got ambition and smarts, you can rise to the top of your chosen profession, regardless of where you started out. But with opportunity comes responsibility. Companies today aren't managing their employees' careers; knowledge workers must, effectively, be their own chief executive officers. It's up to you to carve out your place, to know when to change course, and to keep yourself engaged and productive during a work life that may span some 50 years.

Management professors Sumantra Ghoshal of the London Business School and Christopher Bartlett of the Harvard Business School wrote in 1997 that companies must manage people individually and establish a new work contract. On the one hand, the company must allegedly recognize that personal development creates economic value: "market performance flows not from the omnipotent wisdom of top managers but from the initiative, creativity and skills of all employees". On the other hand, employees should recognize that their work includes personal development and "embrace the invigorating force of continuous learning and personal development".

The 1997 publication of Ghoshal's and Bartlett's Individualized Corporation corresponded to a change in career development from a system of predefined paths defined by companies, to a strategy defined by the individual and matched to the needs of organizations in an open landscape of possibilities. Another contribution to the study of career development came with the recognition that women's careers show specific personal needs and different development paths from men. The 2007 study of women's careers by Sylvia Ann Hewlett Off-Ramps and On-Ramps had a major impact on the way companies view careers. Further work on the career as a personal development process came from study by Herminia Ibarra in her Working Identity on the relationship with career change and identity change, indicating that priorities of work and lifestyle continually develop through life.

Personal development programs in companies fall into two categories: the provision of employee benefits and the fostering of development strategies.

Employee surveys may help organizations find out personal-development needs, preferences and problems, and they use the results to design benefits programs. Typical programs in this category include:

- Work-life balance
- Time management
- Stress management
- Health programs
- Counseling

As an investment, personal development programs have the goal of increasing human capital or improving productivity, innovation or quality. Proponents actually see such programs not as a cost but as an investment with results linked to an organization's strategic development goals. Employees gain access to these investment-oriented programs by selection according to the value and future potential of the employee, usually defined in a talent management architecture including populations such as new hires, perceived high-potential employees, perceived key employees, sales staff, research staff and perceived future leaders. Organizations may also offer other (non-investment-oriented) programs to many or even all employees. Personal development also forms an element in management tools such as personal development planning, assessing one's level of ability using a competency grid, or getting feedback from a 360 questionnaire filled in by colleagues at different levels in the organization.

A common criticism surrounding personal development programs is that they are often treated as an arbitrary performance management tool to pay lip service to, but ultimately ignored. As such, many companies have decided to replace personal development programs with SMART Personal Development Objectives, which are regularly reviewed and updated. Personal Development Objectives help employees achieve career goals and improve overall performance.

=== Criticism ===
Scholars have targeted self-help claims as misleading and incorrect. In 2005, Steve Salerno portrayed the American self-help movement—he uses the acronym "SHAM": the "Self-Help and Actualization Movement"—not only as ineffective in achieving its goals but also as socially harmful, and that self-help customers keep investing money in these services regardless of their effectiveness. Others similarly point out that with self-help books "supply increases the demand ... The more people read them, the more they think they need them ... more like an addiction than an alliance".

Self-help writers have been described as working "in the area of the ideological, the imagined, the narrativized. ... although a veneer of scientism permeates the[ir] work, there is also an underlying armature of moralizing".

== See also ==
- Coaching
- End-of-history illusion
- Holland Codes
- Human Potential Movement
- Know thyself
- Life planning
- Life skills
- Micropsychoanalysis
- Self-discovery
- Spiritual evolution
- Training and development
- True Will
