= Social Purpose Education =

Social Purpose Education was developed at The Northern College for Residential and Community Adult Education by Lou Mycroft and the TeachNorthern teacher education team in 2010. The Workers Educational Association also use the term to describe a similar, empowerment approach to adult education.

Social Purpose Education as a pedagogy is concerned with social change via the growth in confidence, agency and self-belief of individuals. As such, it can be said to be in the tradition of transformational leadership, rather than the transformational learning of Jack Mezirow, as the desired impact is intended to be on communities, rather than remaining within the individual. This makes it a particularly effective pedagogy for workforce development programmes. Social Purpose Education combines pro-social pedagogies such as The Thinking Environment, Restorative Practice, Community Philosophy and Non-Violent Communication with open digital approaches, designed to build "communities of praxis". It comprises four cornerstones of praxis:

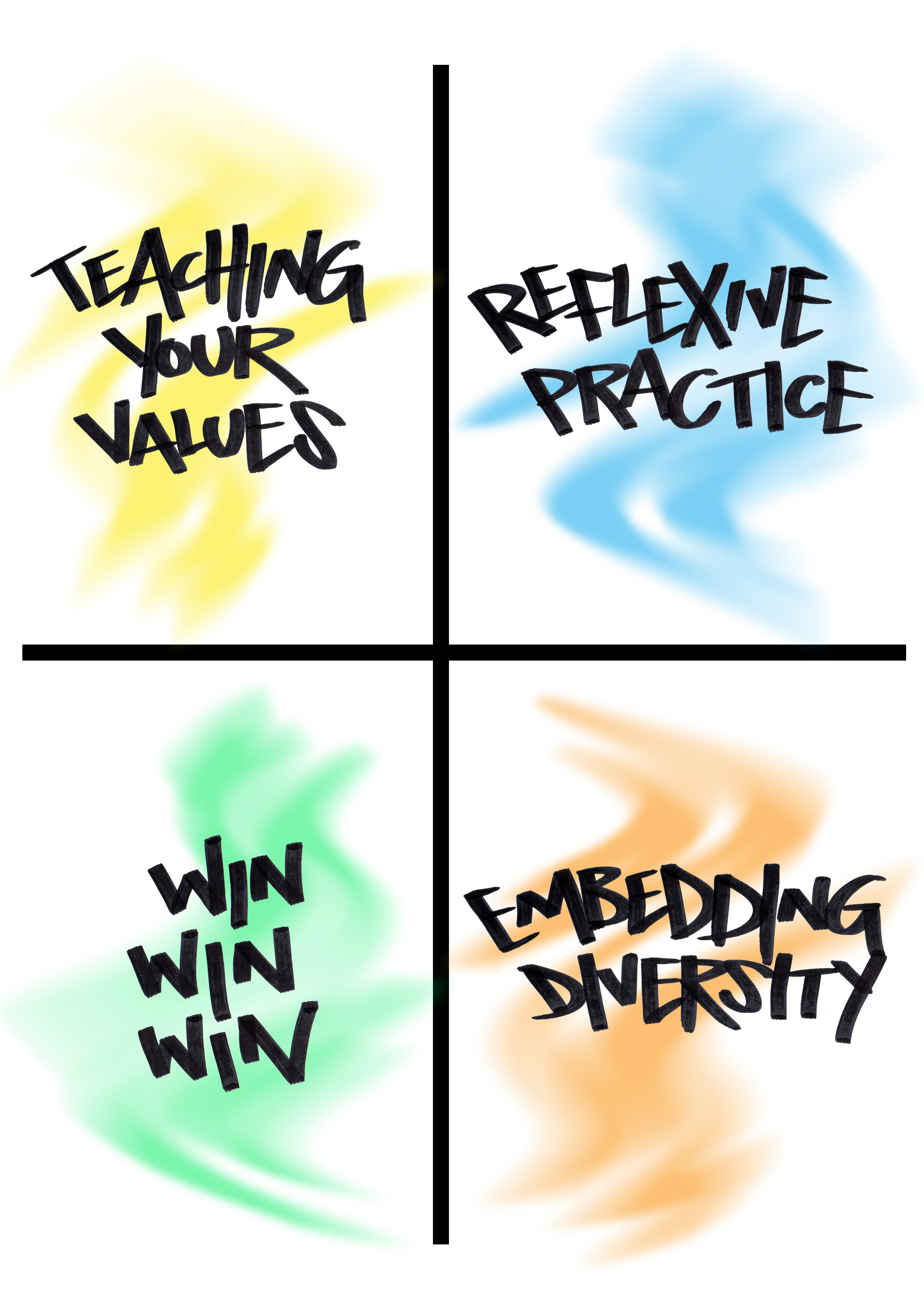
Social Purpose Cornerstones

1. Teaching (to) Your Values Social Purpose Education is explicitly values-based. Participants are invited to regularly check in with their personal values and how these connect with practice principles. The language of values continues to be explicated throughout. Values work is the cornerstone of any transformational education programme, such as the Thinking Environment, Training for Transformation, and Freirean based education (see, for example, the Paulo Freire Institute and Highlander Center).

2. Reflexive Practice Reflexion is defined as a broader practice than the commonly understood practice reflection. Introspection is cut with making connections with theory and with the experience of other participants (students, colleagues), leading to an experience of praxis which avoids solipsism and connects with broader social, political and economic factors. In this way, it leans towards the 'Four Lenses' work of Stephen Brookfield.

3. Win/Win/Win Inspired by Nigel Cutts’s leadership handbook ‘Love at Work', which is in turn inspired by the Thinking Environment, Win/Win/Win refers to the impact of social purpose education on the teacher, the student and the wider communities of both. It is an element of what Hannah Arendt called vita activa, or the active life.

4. Embedding Diversity An assumption of social purpose education is that it has a responsibility to challenge the social, political and economic status quo, by using a posthuman approach to challenge axiomatic thinking. Gramsci and others wrote about ‘hegemony’ – a difficult word to say, spell or understand but one which has no equal in explicating the cultural blindness of contexts and organisations which, without even realising, can exclude diversity by assuming we are all the same.

== External sources ==
- Paulo Freire Institute
