= Meaning-making =

Process of understanding changes in life

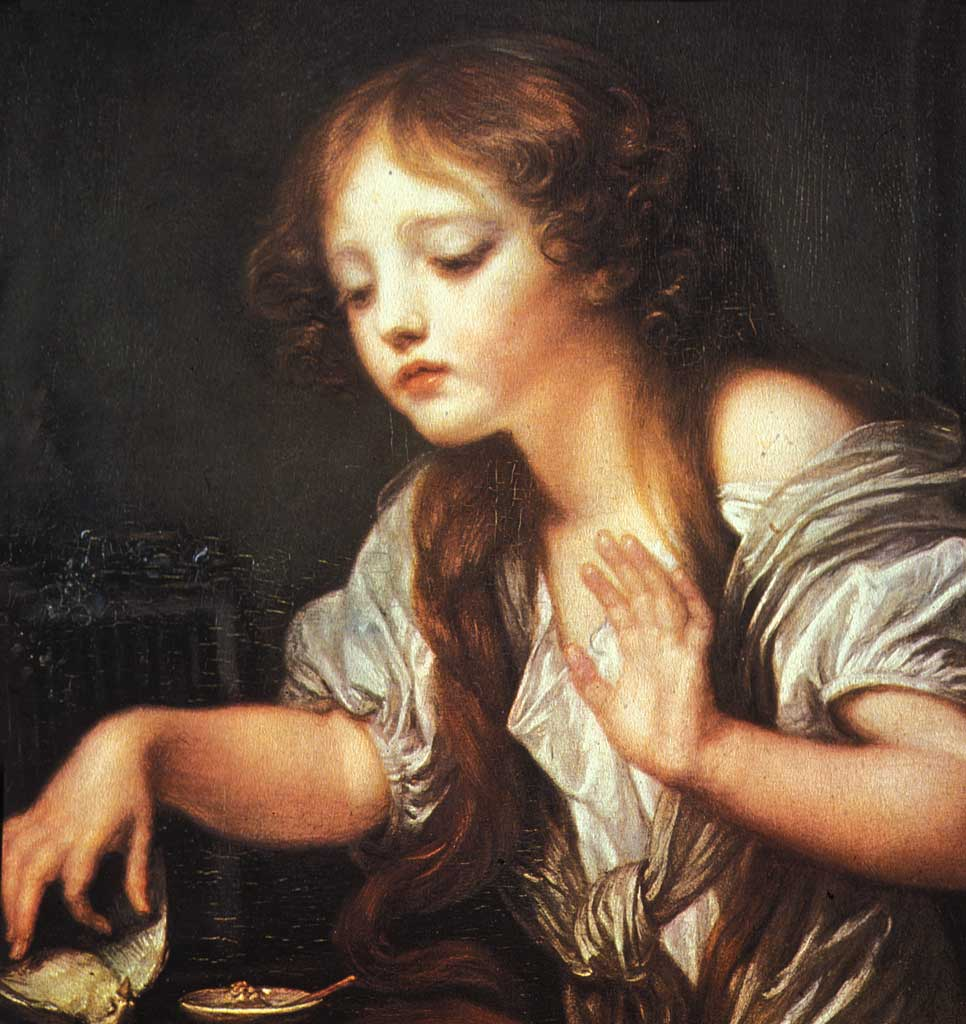
Young Girl Weeping for her Dead Bird by Jean-Baptiste Greuze

In psychology, meaning-making is the process of how people (and other living beings) construe, understand, or make sense of life events, relationships, and the self.

The term is widely used in constructivist approaches to counseling psychology and psychotherapy, especially during bereavement in which people attribute some sort of meaning to an experienced death or loss. The term is also used in educational psychology.

Social meaning-making is the main research object of social semiotics and related disciplines.

== History ==
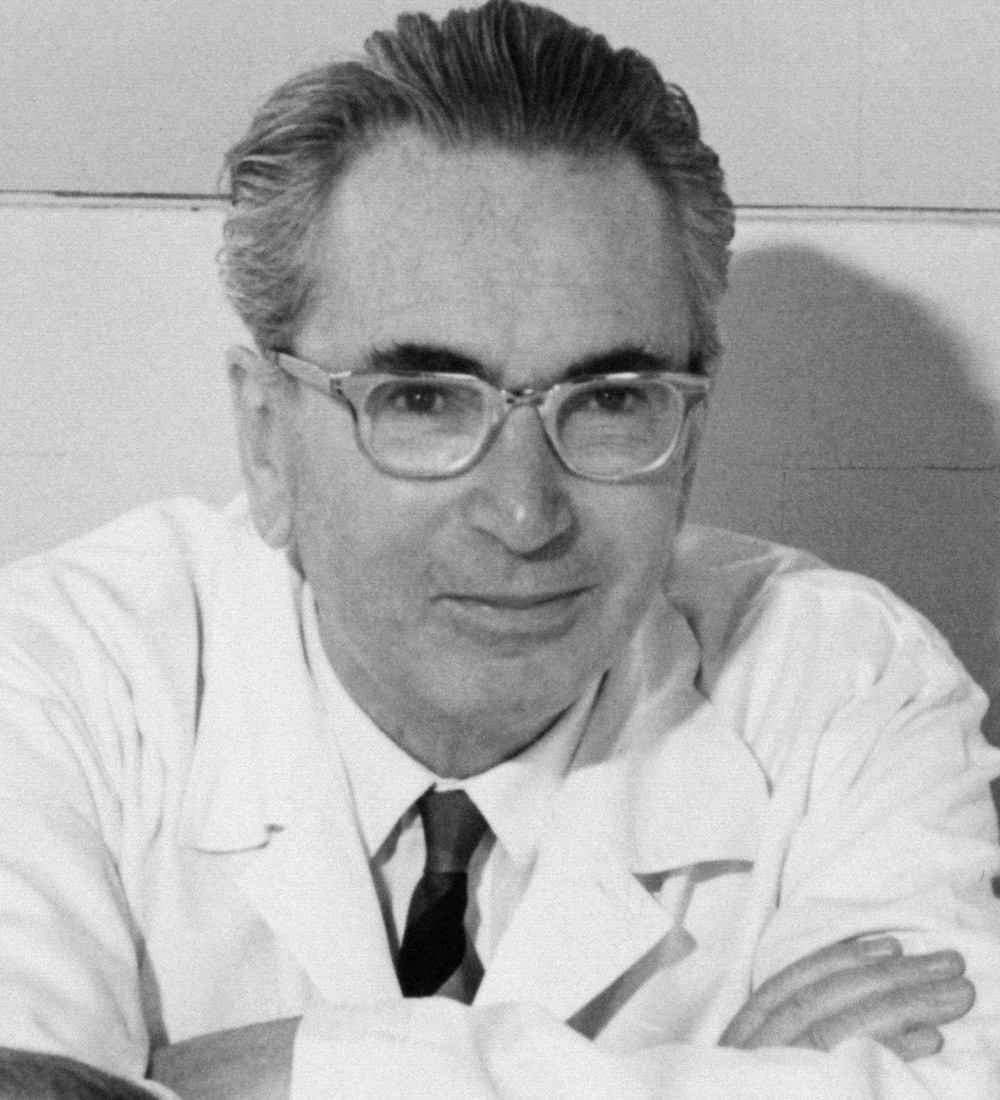
Viktor Frankl, author of Man's Search for Meaning

Psychiatrist and holocaust survivor Viktor Frankl, founder of logotherapy in the 1940s, posited in his 1946 book Man's Search for Meaning that the primary motivation of a person is to discover meaning in life. Frankl insisted that meaning can be discovered under all circumstances, even in the most miserable experiences of loss and tragedy. He said that people could discover meaning through doing a deed, experiencing value, and experiencing suffering. Although Frankl did not use the term "meaning-making," his emphasis on the creation of meaning significantly influenced subsequent psychological theorists.

Neil Postman and Charles Weingartner, both of whom were educational critics and promoters of inquiry education, published a chapter called "Meaning Making" in their 1969 book Teaching as a Subversive Activity. In this chapter, they described why they preferred the term "meaning making" to any other metaphors for teaching and learning:

In the light of all this, perhaps you will understand why we prefer the metaphor "meaning making" to most of the metaphors of the mind that are operative in the schools. It is, to begin with, much less static than the others. It stresses a process view of minding, including the fact that "minding" is undergoing constant change. "Meaning making" also forces us to focus on the individuality and the uniqueness of the meaning maker (the minder). In most of the other metaphors there is an assumption of "sameness" in all learners. The "garden" to be cultivated, the darkness to be lighted, the foundation to be built upon, the clay to be molded—there is always the implication that all learning will occur in the same way. The flowers will be the same color, the light will reveal the same room, the clay will take the same shape, and so on. Moreover, such metaphors imply boundaries, a limit to learning. How many flowers can a garden hold? How much water can a bucket take? What happens to the learner after his mind has been molded? How large can a building be, even if constructed on a solid foundation? The "meaning maker" has no such limitation. There is no end to his educative process. He continues to create new meanings...

— Neil Postman and Charles Weingartner, "Meaning Making"

By the end of the 1970s, the term "meaning-making" was used with increasing frequency. The term came to be used often in constructivist learning theory which posits that knowledge is something that is actively created by people as they experience new things and integrate new information with their current knowledge. Developmental psychologist Robert Kegan used the term "meaning-making" as a key concept in several widely cited texts on counseling and human development published in the late 1970s and early 1980s. Kegan wrote: "Human being is meaning making. For the human, what evolving amounts to is the evolving of systems of meaning; the business of organisms is to organize, as Perry (1970) says." The term "meaning-making" has also been used by psychologists influenced by George Kelly's personal construct theory.

In a review of the meaning-making literature published in 2010, psychologist Crystal L. Park noted that there was a rich body of theory on meaning-making, but empirical research had not kept pace with theory development. In 2014, the First Congress on the Construction of Personal Meaning was held as part of the Eighth Biennial International Meaning Conference convened by the International Network on Personal Meaning.

== Learning as meaning-making ==
The term meaning-making has been used in constructivist educational psychology to refer to the personal epistemology that people create to help them to make sense of the influences, relationships, and sources of knowledge in their world.

For example, around 1980 psychologist Robert Kegan developed a theoretical framework that posited five levels of meaning-making inspired by Piaget's theory of cognitive development; each level describes a more advanced way of understanding experiences, and people may come to master each level as they develop psychologically. In Kegan's book In Over Our Heads, he applied his theory of meaning-making to the life domains of parenting (families), partnering (couples), working (companies), healing (psychotherapies), and learning (schools).

According to the transformative learning theory that sociologist and educator Jack Mezirow developed in the 1980s and 1990s, adults interpret the meaning of their experiences through a lens of deeply held assumptions. When they experience something that contradicts or challenges their way of negotiating the world they have to go through the transformative process of evaluating their assumptions and processes of making meaning, which can lead to personal growth and expanded perspectives. Mezirow called these experiences that force individuals to engage in critical self-reflection "disorienting dilemmas".

In operant (behavioral) psychology, Richard DeGrandpre cited Kegan and showed how the operant conditioning model could be interpreted as a meaning-making process. As traditionally understood in behavioral theory, the stimulus operates control over behavior as that behavior is reinforced in the presence of that stimulus. DeGrandpre argued that consequences do not reinforce behavior, per se, but rather shape the meaning of the stimulus conditions in which the behavior occurs. Thus in DeGrandpre's interpretation, much of human meaning is a product of this contingency, where meaningful stimuli come to guide people's behavior, including private emotions, as a result of people's long histories of consequent events. This interpretation is summarized:

The emphasis ... is on the generality of basic operant concepts, where learning is a process of meaning making that is governed largely by natural contingencies; reinforcement is an organic process in which environment–behavior relations are selected, defined here as a dialectical process of meaning making; and reinforcers are experiential consequences with acquired, ecologically derived meanings.

== Social semiotics ==
Social semiotics is the study of the social dimensions of meaning, and of the power of human processes of signification and interpretation (known as semiosis) in shaping individuals and societies. Social semiotics focuses on social meaning-making practices of all types, whether visual, verbal or aural in nature. These different systems for meaning-making, or possible "channels" (e.g. speech, writing, images) are known as semiotic modes (or semiotic registers). Semiotic modes can include visual, verbal, written, gestural and musical resources for communication. They also include various "multimodal" ensembles of any of these modes.

Social semiotics can include the study of how people design and interpret meanings, the study of texts, and the study of how semiotic systems are shaped by social interests and ideologies, and how they are adapted as society changes Structuralist semiotics in the tradition of Ferdinand de Saussure focused primarily on theorising semiotic systems or structures (termed langue by de Saussure, which change diachronically, i.e. over longer periods of time). In contrast, social semiotics tries to account for the variability of semiotic practices termed parole by Saussure. This altered focus shows how individual creativity, changing historical circumstances, and new social identities and projects can all change patterns of usage and design. From a social semiotic perspective, rather than being fixed into unchanging "codes", signs are considered to be resources which people use and adapt (or "design") to make meaning. In these respects, social semiotics was influenced by, and shares many of the preoccupations of pragmatics (Charles W. Morris) and sociolinguistics and has much in common with cultural studies and critical discourse analysis.

The main task of social semiotics is to develop analytical and theoretical frameworks which can explain meaning-making in a social context.

== In bereavement ==
With the experience of a death, people often have to create new meaning of their loss. Interventions that promote meaning-making may be beneficial to grievers, as some interventions have been found to improve both mental health and physical health. However, according to some researchers, "for certain individuals from challenging backgrounds, efforts after meaning might not be psychologically healthy" when those efforts are "more similar to rumination than to resolution" of problems.

Some researchers report that meaning-making can help people feel less distressed, and allows people to become more resilient in the face of loss. On the converse, failing to attribute meaning to death leads to more long-term distress for some people.

There are various strategies people can utilize for meaning-making; many of them are summarized in the book Techniques of Grief Therapy. One study developed a "Meaning of Loss Codebook" which clusters common meaning-making strategies into 30 categories. Amongst these meaning-making strategies, the most frequently used categories include: personal growth, family bonds, spirituality, valuing life, negative affect, impermanence, lifestyle changes, compassion, and release from suffering.

=== Family bonds ===
Individuals using existing family bonds for meaning-making have a "change in outlook and/or behavior towards family members". With this meaning-making strategy, individuals create meaning of loss through their interactions with family members, and make more efforts to spend more time with them. When individuals use family to give meaning to loss, more meaning-making strategies emerge within the family system. A couple of strategies that family members use to help each other cope are discussing the legacy of the deceased and talking to non-family members about the loss.

When family members are able to openly express their attitudes and beliefs, it can lead to better well-being and less disagreement in the family. Meaning-making with one's family can also increase marital satisfaction by reducing family tension, especially if the deceased was another family member.

=== Spirituality and religiosity ===
Meaning-making through spirituality and religiosity is significant because it helps individuals cope with their loss, as well as develop their own spiritual or religious beliefs. Spirituality and religiosity helps grievers think about a transcendental reality, share their worldview, and feel a sense of belonging to communities with shared beliefs.

When individuals with a divinity worldview make meaning through spirituality and religiosity, those "individuals perceive the divine to be involved in a major stressful life event" and use the divine to develop a meaning for the loss. There are three main ways in which a theistic individual may create meaning through religion, all of which contribute to how the griever may create meaning of their loss:

- Benevolent religious reappraisals cast God in a positive light and grievers may see the death as a part of God's plan
- Punishing God reappraisals cast God in dark light and grievers may blame God for the loss or feel punished by God
- Reappraisals of God's power question God's ability to intervene in the situation.

Another meaning-making strategy people use is to create meaning by valuing their own life. People who create meaning in this way may try to cherish the life they have, try to find their purpose, or change their lifestyles.

=== Philanthropy ===
Grievers can make meaning of death through philanthropic services such as charities, foundations, and organizations. Meaning-making through philanthropy can create financial support, social support, emotional support, and helps create positive results from the negative experience of the death. For example, one couple that lost a child described how they developed "Nora's Project" after their daughter with a disability died, in order to help provide wheelchairs for children with disabilities around the world. The mother said: "With Nora's Project, I am also healing. I am able to turn something that was horrific, the way she died, into something that will do good in the world". Like this mother, it is common for individuals to want to create or do something positive for others. Philanthropy helps people make meaning by continuously and altruistically honoring a life while simultaneously helping others going through a similar experience.

== In cancer treatment ==
Cancer can be a threat to a person's identity, safety, security, bodily integrity, and sense of self. As such, the experience can often compel patients, survivors, and caregivers to search for meaning. Two main ways people can make meaning out of cancer is by assimilating the experience as a new situation within their current worldview or by changing (accommodating) their whole worldview for a new meaning of life. A patient's meaning-making process in the wake of a cancer diagnosis is associated with improved psychosocial outcomes, like less anxiety and depression. On the other hand, a lack of meaning is associated with increased psychological distress, like depression and wishing for a faster death.

A cancer diagnosis can also cause caregivers to question the meaning of the experience or life in general. The caregiving role can be very demanding—both physically and emotionally—as caregivers are expected to manage pain, medications, and activities of daily living all while contending with their own fears, anxiety, and grief. At the same time, many loved ones find the act of caregiving to be meaningful itself, as it leads to connection, purpose, and growth. Interventions such as meaning-centered psychotherapy for cancer caregivers (MCP-C) and existential behavioral therapy (EBT) are evidence-based treatments that help caregivers manage their own distress while finding meaning and purpose in the experience.

For cancer patients themselves, various psychosocial interventions targeting meaning-making have been found to be effective. Dignity therapy, meaning-centered psychotherapy, and acceptance and commitment therapy have all shown promise. A 2019 meta-analysis that included 29 randomized controlled trials found that psychosocial interventions targeting meaning and purpose produced small to medium sized improvements in these domains.

== See also ==
- Biosemiotics
- Cognitive development
- Ikigai
- Meaning (non-linguistic)
- Meaning (philosophy)
- Meaningful life
- Narrative identity
- Positive adult development
- Posttraumatic growth
- Reflective equilibrium
- Semiosis
- Sensemaking
- Social action
- Universal pragmatics
- Verstehen
- Zoosemiotics
