= Chris Bartlett =

Chris Bartlett may refer to:

- Chris Bartlett (writer) (born 1976), London-based writer and journalist
- Chris Bartlett (musician) (born 1981), American guitarist, music teacher, author and singer-songwriter
- Chris Bartlett (activist) (born 1966), American gay activist, feminist, educator, and researcher

== See also ==
- Christopher A. Bartlett (born 1943), Australian organizational theorist
