= Daphne Alloway McVicker =

American writer

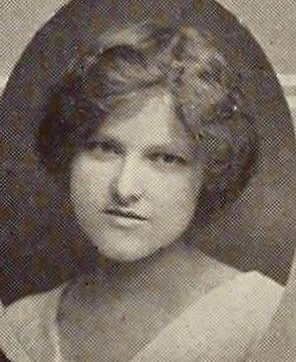
- Daphne Alloway (later McVicker), from the 1916 yearbook of Ohio State University
- Born: Daphne Ninnette Alloway; March 14, 1895; Cambridge, Ohio
- Died: May 24, 1979 (aged 84); New York City
- Occupation: Writer
- Children: 3, including Blythe McVicker Clinchy

Daphne Alloway McVicker (March 14, 1895 – May 24, 1979) was an American writer, mainly of short stories, and a comic memoir, The Queen Was in the Kitchen (1944).

== Early life and education ==
Daphne Ninnette Alloway was born in Cambridge, Ohio, the daughter of James William Alloway and Ninnette McKinley Alloway. Her father was a grocer. She graduated from Ohio State University in 1916.

== Career ==
McVicker published hundreds of poems and short stories in magazines and newspapers. She was especially successful in romance magazines, "both confessions and slicks", with titles including Romantic Love Secrets, Sweetheart Stories, Ainslee's Smart Love Stories. She also had stories published in more mainstream women's magazines, such as Cosmopolitan and McCall's. Some of her stories were anthologized in story collections and school readers.

McVicker was a member of Theta Sigma Phi, and spoke at their annual banquet in 1930. In 1940 she won the Headliner Award from Theta Sigma Phi's successor organization, the Association for Women in Communications.

The New York Times praised McVicker's 1944 comic memoir, The Queen Was in the Kitchen, with the reviewer saying "Domestic harassments are among the most unbecoming of woes, but on Mrs. McVicker they wear well." Her story "I Weep for You" (Cosmopolitan, June 1945) is a campus romance involving a disabled veteran of World War II.

== Publications ==
- "The Giving Half of the Word" (1922)
- "The Princess with the Tired Shadow" (1927)
- "The Search for a Charm" (1927)
- "According to the Canary" (1935)
- "Monthly Bill" (1935)
- "Baked in a Pie" (1935)
- "Tourists Accommodated" (1936)
- "Billy Calf Runs Away" (1940)
- The Queen Was in the Kitchen (1944)
- "Little Cocktail" (1944)
- "High Heels" (1945)
- "I Weep for You" (1945)
- "Love Is Gorgeous, I Guess" (1946)
- "Don't Rush Me Baby" (1947)

== Personal life ==
Alloway married journalist Vinton E. McVicker in 1916. They had three children, Laurel, James, and Blythe. Her son died in 1970, and she died in 1979, at the age of 84, in New York City. Blythe McVicker Clinchy became a psychology researcher and chair of the psychology department at Wellesley College.
