= Women's Ways of Knowing =

1986 book

Women's Ways of Knowing: The Development of Self, Voice, and Mind (1986) refers to the seminal work of Mary Field Belenky, Blythe McVicker Clinchy, Nancy Rule Goldberger, and Jill Mattuck Tarule on women's development theory. This work describes the process of cognitive development and voice in women as five knowledge positions (or perspectives) through which women view themselves and their relationship to knowledge.

The study and writing of "Women's Ways of Knowing" was a shared process of authorship, which the authors describe in the 1997 10th anniversary addition of the book.

== Women's ways of knowing ==
Belenky, Clinchy, Goldberger, and Tarule examined the epistemology, or "ways of knowing", of a diverse group of women, with a focus on identity and intellectual development across a broad range of contexts including but not limited to the formal educational system. While conceptually grounded originally in the work of William G. Perry in cognitive (or intellectual) development and Carol Gilligan in moral/personal development in women, the Belenky, Clinchy, Goldberger, and Tarule discovered that existing developmental theories at the time did not address some issues and experiences that were common and significant in the lives and cognitive development of women. While the developmental positions described in "Women's Ways of Knowing" overlap to a large degree with Perry's cognitive developmental scheme, the authors describe additional knowledge perspectives not observed in Perry's study and report gender-related influences on cognitive development in women.

The 135 women who participated in Belenky, Clinchy, Goldberger, and Tarule's study ranged from age 16 to over 60, came from rural and urban populations, and varied in socioeconomic class, ethnicity and educational history. As such, they represented a more diverse group than was included in Perry's 1970 study of male students at Harvard. The authors illustrated how the epistemological assumptions of the participating women were intimately linked to their perceptions of themselves and their relationship to their world. Each of the five "ways of knowing", or knowledge perspectives, represents a different point in the women's cognitive development, dependent on conceptions of self (self), relationship with others (voice) and understanding of the origins and identity of authority, truth and knowledge (mind).

== Ways of Knowing ==
=== Silence ===
Silence is the name given to the first epistemological position, and describes women who felt disconnected from knowledge, the sources of knowledge and their relationship to knowledge. This knowledge perspective, while relatively rare in the women studied and not a necessary precursor to other positions, was absent in Perry's scheme (1970) and not represented in other cognitive developmental theories of the time.

Women describing this position were notable for their extreme sense of isolation and fear of authorities, their fragile sense of self, and feelings of being "deaf and dumb", i.e., having no independent voice. Women in this knowledge position were often young, of limited education, and socioeconomically poor, and very often had experienced a history of abuse. These women viewed themselves as being incapable of knowing or thinking, appeared to conduct little or no internal dialogue and generally felt no sense of connection with others. Their "acts of knowing" involved only specific actions and behaviors occurring in the present. Notably, amongst these women, words were viewed as weapons used to inflict harm, to isolate and to diminish others. Authorities of knowledge were viewed as all-powerful and experiences with authority were overwhelmingly negative for these women.

Belenky, Clinchy, Goldberger, and Tarule emphasize that women who are characterized by the position of silence were overwhelmingly raised "in profound isolation under the most demeaning circumstances" and that their feelings of being "deaf and dumb" originate in a profound lack of confidence in their own "meaning-making and meaning-sharing abilities", rather than a lack of intellectual endowment.

=== Received Knowledge: Listening to the voices of others ===
Received knowledge describes the epistemological position in which women in the study perceived knowledge as a set of absolute truths received from infallible authorities. The process of learning, as understood by received knowers, involves receiving and repeating the knowledge and words of authorities. In this sense words are no longer viewed as weapons, and are seen as critical to the learning process, but the origin and meaning of words and knowledge remain external.

Women characterizing this position lacked confidence in their own ability to speak and generally defined themselves externally, usually in relation to social norms, gender roles and expectations of others, i.e., cultural ideals of women as set forth by external authorities. Received knowers tended to find disagreement, paradox or ambiguity intolerable since these violated the black-and-white absolutist nature of knowledge.

The authors note that in their study received knowers generally had little experience with female role models in authority positions and often emphasized selflessness and care of others as their primary role in life. However, Love and Guthrie emphasize Belenky et al.'s finding that the experience of giving birth provided an important stimulus in moving women from a position of silence to a position of received knowledge.

=== Subjective Knowledge: The inner voice ===
Subjective knowledge is characterized by the recognition of the self as an authority. Subjective knowers rely on their own subjective thoughts, feelings and experiences for knowledge and truth - the "infallible gut" as Belenky, Clinchy, Goldberger and Tarule refer to it.

Women with this perspective at some point experienced the development of a "protesting inner voice", which allowed them to make their own claims to truth and knowledge. Along with the nascent discovery of the inner voice, subjective knowers showed a general distrust of analysis and logical reasoning and did not see value in considering the weight of evidence in evaluating knowledge. Instead, they considered knowledge and truth to be inherently personal and subjective, to be experienced rather than intellectualized. Belenky, Clinchy, Goldberger, and Tarule state that subjective knowers often block out conflicting opinions of others, but may seek the support and affirmation of those in agreement. The authors note that half of the women in their study occupied this position, but that they were spread across the full range of ages.

Like women characterizing the first two positions, pervasive sexual harassment and abuse was evident in the personal histories of subjective knowers, but unlike the first two positions, these women generally felt optimism and positivity towards the future. Love and Guthrie emphasize that the transition to subjective knowledge was most often driven by positive changes in the personal lives of women (a shift to equitable, mutually-respectful and supportive relationships and away from abusive relationships in particular), rather than experiences within the educational system.

=== Procedural Knowledge: Separate and connected knowing ===
Procedural knowledge reflects the recognition that multiple sources of knowledge exist, and that procedures are necessary for evaluating the relative merit of these sources. Procedural knowers focus on methods and techniques for evaluating the accuracy of external truth and the relative worth of authority. The transition to procedural knowledge was experienced by many women in the study as a regression or crisis of confidence initially, as the inner voice of subjective knowing became critical both of external authorities and internal subjective knowledge. However, what followed was the recognition that insights and information outside of personal experience could have bearing on knowledge. Procedural knowers sought to understand authorities, focusing on reasoned reflection rather than absolutism and the use of context-specific procedures to evaluate information that could be interpreted in multiple ways.

Belenky, Clinchy, Goldberger and Tarule describe two alternative modes of procedural knowledge: separate knowing and connected knowing. Separate knowers tend to be adversarial and focused on critical analysis that excludes personal feelings and beliefs. Academic environments often favored this form of procedural knowledge. Connected knowers on the other hand seek to understand others' ideas and points of view, emphasizing the relevance of context in the development of knowledge and the fundamental value of experience.

Most procedural knowers in this study were economically privileged, Caucasian, young college students or graduates.

=== Constructed Knowledge: Integrating the voices ===
Constructed knowledge as a position is characterized by a recognition of the interrelatedness of knowledge, knowing and the knower. Women with this perspective considered all knowledge as constructed, and understood that knowledge is inherently mutable, subject to time, experience, and context; they saw knowledge as "a constant process of construction, deconstruction and reconstruction".

Women in this position generally came to it after intense self-reflection. They were able to engage in what Belenky, Clinchy, Goldberger, and Tarule refer to as real talk: the ability to listen, share and cooperate while maintaining one's own voice undiminished. The position of constructed knowledge often involves enormous "empathetic potential": a capacity to feel connected with another person despite potentially enormous differences. Many women in this position nonetheless experience loneliness and discouragement, largely due to difficulty in finding companionable and supportive partners.

== Relationship to Perry's cognitive development theory ==
The position of silence is absent from Perry's scheme.

Received knowledge is comparable to Perry's dualism in that knowledge is viewed as black-and-white absolute truths handed down by infallible authorities. However, Perry's dualistic men aligned themselves with authority, while Belenky, Clinchy, Goldberger, and Tarule's received knowers generally felt disconnected from authority.

Subjective knowledge is similar to Perry's multiplicity, in that both emphasize personal intuition and truth. However, Perry identified the typical age of the transition to multiplicity as early adolescence, while the women in the above study exhibited this transition over the whole spectrum of ages studied. Love and Guthrie also emphasize that, while this transition is relatively smooth for many of Perry's men, rejection of the past, sometimes including geographic relocation, was critical to this transition in many women in the Belenky, Clinchy, Goldberger, and Tarule study.

Procedural knowledge shared similarities with Perry's relativism in its emphasis on context and situation-specific evidence.

Constructed knowledge is similar to Perry's commitment in the sense that both incorporate the role of the knower in knowledge. Perry called this positions., but Belenky, Clinchy, Goldberger, and Tarule moved away from his focus on dualisms.

== Implications of this research for student affairs professionals ==
Patrick Love and Victoria Guthrie (1999) analyze the work of Belenky and colleagues exploring how women’s experiences shape their ways of knowing. They focus on the concept of "connected knowing," where women understand knowledge through relationships and community, in contrast to "separate knowing," which is often detached and associated with traditional forms of understanding.

The authors highlight the following implications for Student Affairs professionals:

1. Recognize the potential need on the part of some women to reject their past - Some women may need to distance themselves from negative past experiences to grow emotionally and cognitively. Student affairs professionals should avoid viewing this as unhealthy, as it can be crucial for development.
2. Recognize the role of sexual harassment, abuse, and violence in many women's lives and its subsequent influence on cognitive development - topics, often taboo, should be addressed carefully to understand their influence on students' challenges.
3. Recognize the potential disconnection from authority experienced by some women - Many women feel disconnected from authority figures, which can worsen academic difficulties. Student affairs professionals should be aware of this to better support female students.
4. Nurture voices of both separate and connected knowing and the integration of the two - Women may emphasize either analytical (separate) or relational (connected) knowledge. Student affairs professionals should encourage both approaches to foster balanced cognitive growth.

== See also ==
- Feminist epistemology
- Student development theories
- Theory of cognitive development
- Jean Piaget
- Nancy Chodorow, especially The Reproduction of Mothering (1978)
