= Education Council of India =

Education Council of India is an organization working with the United Nations in the field of women's development and education. For the last 33 years, the Education Council of India has worked actively to impart education in different parts of India and successfully conducted seminars and conferences regarding educational growth.
