= Epistemic cognition =

Cognition about knowledge and knowing

Epistemic cognition, sometimes known as epistemological beliefs, or personal epistemology, is "cognition about knowledge and knowing", an area of research in the learning sciences and educational psychology. Research into epistemic cognition investigates people's beliefs regarding the characteristics of knowledge and knowing—as distinct from thinking or believing in general—and the impact of this on learning.

== Scope of research ==
Research on epistemic cognition has drawn on research in epistemology, the area of philosophy concerned with the nature of knowledge.

The seminal work in the area is characterised as research on student development and as an area of developmental psychology. More recent work has sought to situate epistemic cognition in a broad non-developmental model of learning. This work has linked epistemic cognition at an individual level to models of (1) metacognition, the construct characterising how people think about thinking, and (2) self-regulated learning, which characterises ability to identify learning needs and plan towards them, monitor, and reflect (including the work of Krista R. Muis).

Much of the research in epistemic cognition has taken place in science education contexts, with a focus on the relationship between scientific thinking, and beliefs regarding the 'nature of science', and epistemic cognition. Some of this research reflects the situated nature of scientific practices. Other work has explored relationships between epistemic cognition and constructs including, critical thinking, historical thinking, processing of sources of varying quality and levels of conflict, and broader academic achievement.

Alongside investigation of learner epistemic cognition, a parallel line of work has investigated teacher epistemic cognition, and the influence of this on teaching practices and classroom assessment.

== Models ==
The research emerged in part from William G. Perry's research on the cognitive intellectual development of male Harvard College students. Developmental theories of epistemic cognition in this model have been developed by Deanna Kuhn and others, with a focus on the sequential phases of development characterising changes in views of knowledge and knowing. Kuhn said that her work built on Jean Piaget's work in the mid–20th century on genetic epistemology. In contrast, dimensional models do not characterise epistemic cognition in terms of sequential development. Instead, they posit multiple factors that make up one's beliefs, which may vary independent of each other.

In recent years, epistemic cognition research has reflected shifts in epistemology, in drawing on naturalized epistemology and virtue epistemology, in situated accounts of epistemic cognition, and a greater focus on the aims and processes of knowing (and beliefs thereof).

== Application to learning ==
As Sandoval, Greene, and Bråten (2016) outline, epistemic cognition research, largely from the learning sciences community, has found that epistemic cognition is related to academic performance, and other learning constructs. However, there are concerns regarding standard psychometric instruments (surveys) used to measure epistemic cognition, and evidence that epistemic cognition may be domain- and perhaps task-specific, rather than general.
