= Arthur Chickering =

Arthur Chickering may refer to:

- Arthur M. Chickering (1887–1974), American arachnologist
- Arthur W. Chickering (1927–2020), educational researcher in the field of student affairs
