= Transformative learning =

Type of learning powerful enough to revise worldview and self-perception

Transformative learning, as a theory, says that the process of "perspective transformation" has three dimensions: psychological (changes in understanding of the self), convictional (revision of belief systems), and behavioral (changes in lifestyle).

Transformative learning is the expansion of consciousness through the transformation of basic worldview and specific capacities of the self; transformative learning is facilitated through consciously directed processes such as appreciatively accessing and receiving the symbolic contents of the unconscious and critically analyzing underlying premises.

Perspective transformation, leading to transformative learning, occurs infrequently. Jack Mezirow believes that it usually results from a "disorienting dilemma" which is triggered by a life crisis or major life transition—although it may also result from an accumulation of transformations in meaning schemes over a period of time. Less dramatic predicaments, such as those created by a teacher for pedagogical effect, also promote transformation.

An important part of transformative learning is for individuals to change their frames of reference by critically reflecting on their assumptions and beliefs and consciously making and implementing plans that bring about new ways of defining their worlds. This process is fundamentally rational and analytical.

== Jack Mezirow ==
Jack Mezirow developed transformative learning theory starting in 1978. Since then, the theory has evolved "into a comprehensive and complex description of how learners construe, validate, and reformulate the meaning of their experience." For learners to change their meaning schemes (specific beliefs, attitudes, and emotional reactions), "they must engage in critical reflection on their experiences, which in turn leads to a perspective transformation." The meaning schemes that make up meaning structures may change as an individual adds to or integrates ideas within an existing scheme and, in fact, this transformation of meaning schemes occurs routinely through learning.

A defining condition of being human is that we have to understand the meaning of our experience. For some, any uncritically assimilated explanation by an authority figure will suffice. But in contemporary societies we must learn to make our own interpretations rather than act on the purposes, beliefs, judgments, and feelings of others. Facilitating such understandings is the cardinal goal of adult education. Transformative learning develops autonomous thinking.

A perspective transformation leading to transformative learning, however, occurs much less frequently. Mezirow believes that this less frequent transformation usually results from a "disorienting dilemma", which is triggered by a life crisis or major life transition, although it may also result from an accumulation of transformations in meaning schemes over a period of time.

The perspective transformation is explained by Mezirow as follows:

1. Disorienting dilemma
2. Self-examination
3. Sense of alienation
4. Relating discontent to others
5. Explaining options of new behavior
6. Building confidence in new ways
7. Planning a course of action
8. Knowledge to implement plans
9. Experimenting with new roles
10. Reintegration.

== Other perspectives ==
A number of critical responses to Mezirow's theory of transformative learning have emerged over the years. One criticism of Mezirow's theory is its emphasis upon rationality. Some studies support Mezirow. Others conclude that Mezirow grants rational critical reflection too much importance.

Edward W. Taylor has since suggested neurobiological research as a promising area that may offer some explanation about the role emotions play, closing the gap between rationality and emotion in the transformative learning process. Taylor implies that, with available modern technology such as magnetic resonance imaging (MRI) and positron emission tomography (PET), these once obscure factors can now be examined by determining which neurological brain systems are at work during disorienting dilemmas and the journey of recovery that follows. This neurobiological research also stresses the role of implicit memory, from which emerge habits, attitudes, and preferences related to unconscious thoughts and actions.

While the learning process is certainly rational on some levels, it is also a profound experience that can be described as a spiritual or emotional transformation. The experience of undoing racist, sexist, and other oppressive attitudes can be painful and emotional, as these attitudes have often been developed as ways to cope with and make sense of the world. This type of learning requires taking risks and being willing to be vulnerable and to have one's attitudes and assumptions challenged.

Other theorists have proposed a view of transformative learning as an intuitive and emotional process. John M. Dirkx, Robert D. Boyd, J. Gordon Myers, and Rosemary R. Ruether link Mezirow's rational, cognitive and analytical approach to a more intuitive, creative and holistic view of transformative learning. This view of transformative learning is based primarily on the work of Robert Boyd, who has developed a theory of transformative education based on analytical (or depth) psychology.

For Boyd, transformation is a "fundamental change in one's personality involving [together] the resolution of a personal dilemma and the expansion of consciousness resulting in greater personality integration". This calls upon extra-rational sources such as symbols, images, and archetypes to assist in creating a personal vision or meaning of what it means to be human.

First, an individual must be receptive or open to receiving "alternative expressions of meaning", and then recognize that the message is authentic. Grieving, considered by Boyd to be the most critical phase of the discernment process, takes place when an individual realizes that old patterns or ways of perceiving are no longer relevant, moves to adopt or establish new ways, and finally integrates old and new patterns. More recent research has specifically explored the process of transformative learning as it occurs in bereaved elders, maintaining that the "disorienting dilemma" deemed necessary by Mezirow is present in the loss of a loved one, with an additional devastating factor being the isolation that the elderly in particular are likely to face. Another study considers transformative learning in the context of suicide bereavement. In these cases the dilemma is compounded by the questioning of conceptions or misconceptions that were held about the relationship with the deceased, and the resolving of the meaning of that relationship during the grieving process.

Unlike Mezirow, who sees the ego as playing a central role in the process of perspective transformation, Boyd and Myers use a framework that moves beyond the ego and the emphasis on reason and logic to a definition of transformative learning that is more psychosocial in nature.

Another definition of transformative learning was put forward by Edmund O'Sullivan:

Transformative learning involves experiencing a deep, structural shift in the basic premises of thought, feelings, and actions. It is a shift of consciousness that dramatically and irreversibly alters our way of being in the world. Such a shift involves our understanding of ourselves and our self-locations; our relationships with other humans and with the natural world; our understanding of relations of power in interlocking structures of class, race and gender; our body awareness, our visions of alternative approaches to living; and our sense of possibilities for social justice and peace and personal joy.

Positing that understanding transformative learning may have been hindered by perspectives of rational thought and Western traditions, Kathleen P. King provides an alternate model grounded in a meta-analysis of research, the "Transformative Learning Opportunities Model".

Recent considerations of these varying perspectives seem to indicate that one perspective does not need to exclude the other. For example, Mezirow and Dirkx discussed their views on transformative learning at a 2005 International Transformative Learning Conference. This dialogue, facilitated by Patricia Cranton, continued via email after the conference and the overview was published in the Journal of Transformative Education. Dirkx focuses on subjectivity, in the power of the inner world in one's shift in view of the outer world. Mezirow emphasizes critical assessment of assumptions. Although their approaches are different, they agree that their perspectives are similar in several aspects. This includes transforming frames of reference that have lost meaning or have become dysfunctional, and fostering enhanced awareness and consciousness of one's being in the world. Both perspectives are required to deepen understanding and to incorporate these ways of learning into transformative education.

One of the difficulties in defining transformative learning is that it bleeds into the boundaries of concepts such as "meaning making" or "critical thinking".

The term "meaning making" (i.e., constructing meaning) is found most frequently in constructivist approaches to education, based on the work of educators such as John Dewey, Maria Montessori, Jean Piaget, Jerome Bruner, and Lev Vygotsky. In the constructivist view, meaning is constructed from knowledge.

John Dirkx views transformational learning as a meaning-making process within adult education, aimed at promoting a democratic vision of society and self-actualization of individuals. Learning is life—not a preparation for it. Therefore, transformational learning requires authenticity, a commitment to focus on the here and now, and awareness of feelings and emotions within the learning setting. The relationship between the individual and the broader world is discussed in terms of the critical role it plays in learning. Dirkx describes our emotions and feelings as a kind of language for helping us learn about ourselves, our relationships with others and how we make sense of all aspects of our experiences, both objective and subjective. Our sense of who we are and what our relationship is to the world must naturally be drawn into the learning process, leading to deeper engagements with ourselves and the world.

Mezirow posits that all learning is change but not all change is transformation. There is a difference between transmissional, transactional and transformational education. In the first, knowledge is transmitted from teacher to student. In transactional education, it is recognized that the student has valuable experiences, and learns best through experience, inquiry, critical thinking and interaction with other learners. It could be argued that some of the research regarding transformative learning has been in the realm of transactional education, and that what is seen as transformative by some authors is in fact still within the realm of transactional learning.

According to Stephen D. Brookfield, learning can only be considered transformative if it involves a fundamental questioning or reordering of how one thinks or acts; a challenge to hegemonic implications. In other words, reflection alone does not result in transformative learning unless the process involves a critical reflection, a recognition and analysis of taken-for-granted assumptions.

== In practice ==
On the surface, the two views of transformative learning presented here are contradictory. One advocates a rational approach that depends primarily on critical reflection whereas the other relies more on intuition and emotion. However, the differences in the two views may best be seen as a matter of emphasis. Both utilize rational processes and incorporate imagination as a part of a creative process. The two different views of transformative learning described here as well as examples of how it occurs in practice suggest that no single model of transformative learning exists.

When transformative learning is the goal of adult education, fostering a learning environment in which it can occur should consider the following:

=== The role of the educator ===
Transformative learning cannot be guaranteed. Teachers can only provide an opportunity to transformatively learn. In order to foster transformative learning, the educator's role is to assist learners in becoming aware and critical of assumptions. This includes their own assumptions that lead to their interpretations, beliefs, habits of mind, or points of view, as well as the assumptions of others. Educators must provide learners practice in recognizing frames of reference. By doing so, educators encourage practice in redefining problems from different perspectives. The goal is to create a community of learners who are "united in a shared experience of trying to make meaning of their life experience".

Educators need to provide learners with opportunities to effectively participate in discourse. Discourse involves assessing beliefs, feelings, and values. This dialogue has the goal of assessing reasons behind competing interpretations through critical examination of evidence, arguments, and alternate points of view. Learners are able to validate how and what they understand, as well as develop well-informed judgments regarding a belief. Educators can encourage critical reflection and experience with discourse through the implementation of methods including metaphor analysis, concept mapping, consciousness raising, life histories, repertory grids, and participation in social action.

The educator must encourage equal participation among students in discourse. One strategy is to encourage procedures that require group members to take on the roles of monitoring the direction of dialogue and ensuring equal participation. Educators can also encourage dialogue from different perspectives through controversial statements or readings from opposing points of view. It is necessary that the educator avoids shaping the discussion.

The role of educators is also to set objectives that include autonomous thinking. By fostering learners' critical reflection and experience in discourse, autonomous thinking is possible. The foundations to thinking autonomously begin in childhood and continue in adulthood. The educator assists adult learners in becoming more critical in assessing assumptions, better at recognizing frames of references and alternate perspectives, as well as effective at collaborating with others to assess and arrive at judgments in regards to beliefs.

It is the role of the educator to promote discovery learning through the implementation of classroom methods such as learning contracts, group projects, role play, case studies, and simulations. These methods facilitate transformative learning by helping learners examine concepts in the context of their lives and analyze the justification of new knowledge.

The educator's role in establishing an environment that builds trust and care and facilitates the development of sensitive relationships among learners is a fundamental principle of fostering transformative learning. The educator also serves as a role model by demonstrating a willingness to learn and change. Teachers should provide the environment to allow students to reflect on their transformative learning experiences, but to also allow them to reflect on their own. As a result, professional development is important to assist educators in becoming authentic and critically reflective.

Mezirow outlines three ways in which experience is interpreted through reflection:

- Content reflection is the investigation of the content. A question that we might ask ourselves is “what did I do that led to the outcome?
- Process reflection includes checking on the problem-solving strategies that are used in the classroom. For example, “do I understand the needs of my students?”
- Premise reflection is the question of the problem itself. A question might be "“why do I feel responsible for this situation”.

=== The role of professional development for the educator ===
Transformative learning about teaching occurs when educators critically examine their practice and develop alternative perspectives of understanding their practice. It is essential that fostering this critical examination become the role of professional development. The role of professional development is to assist educators in gaining awareness of their habits of mind regarding teaching. As this professional development occurs, educators critically examine the assumptions that underlie their practice, the consequences to their assumptions, and develop alternative perspectives on their practice.

Teachers need education and professional development that will help them to question, challenge and experience critical discussions on school improvement. Transforming teachers so they see themselves as agents of social change can be a challenge within education.

==== Strategies for transformative professional development ====
Strategies for transformative professional development include action plans, reflective activities, case studies, curriculum development, and critical-theory discussions. Action plans and reflective activities provide the practice and modelling of critical reflection on the profession of education, and provide guidance for the teaching and learning experience. Through the use of real-life examples, case studies provide the opportunity to analyze assumptions, as well as the consequences of choices and actions. The use of case studies focuses on practice, and on the philosophical and practical aspects of educators' practice. Curriculum development creates the opportunity to connect theory and practice. In addition to introducing new teaching techniques, educators can test and compare new concepts and practices with previous techniques. This testing and comparison moves away from uncritically accepting new teaching methods. Critical-theory discussions can be implemented to guide educators in questioning the meaning and purpose of information, encouraging educators to question the selection of the information they provide to their students.

==== Examples in educator professional development ====
Mentoring is another strategy for transformative professional, personal and organizational development. By creating a supportive culture, mentoring can provide the environment for transformative learning to occur. Through this experience mentoring becomes a transformative relationship in which individuals reconstruct possible selves. As a two-way process, mentoring is a learning tool for both the mentor as well as the person being mentored.

In a recent study, Karen Weller Swanson, applying theories of critical reflection, incorporating a critical incident model, and positing a learning partnership, designed a program for practicing teachers, for the purpose of transformative teacher development. Experiences were created to get teachers to reflect on their assumptions, asking them to consider alternative perspectives and to develop a language for making connections between theory and practice. Over the studies' two-year period, teachers were able to develop ownership of theory and transfer this knowledge into their practice. To be effective, transformative teacher development must value what teachers bring from their personal and professional experience, and acknowledge that learning is both an individual and a social experience. The process involved: achieving transparency through negotiation of curriculum, finding a common language through discussion of individual assumptions, getting continuous feedback through critical-incident questions, and testing by teacher application of the program within their classrooms. Autobiography and journaling were additional techniques used within this learning partnership. Both teachers and faculty participating in the program were transformed as beliefs were challenged and knowledge was co-constructed throughout the experience.

New teachers often find expectations ambiguous, and they lack the self-awareness and understanding to navigate the educational environment. A transformative learning framework was used in a Foundations course, for participants to build on individual and collective analysis of teaching experiences, and to help them re-frame their practice. Giedre Kligyte investigated "transformation narratives" that emerged from written reflection of participants' teaching practice, based on individual reflection and group discussion. By using Mezirow's work, along with Robert Kegan's constructive developmental theory, Kligyte found the following themes: a move from non-reflective habitual action to a more conscious practice; a change in perspective to a more sophisticated view of teaching; an increased sense of agency, including the concept that academic practice is an object which can be controlled and shaped, rather than something externally imposed; increased confidence to take risks and experiment; and a more multifaceted idea of what it means to be an academic. The conducive environment allowed for transformative experiences to occur. Through creation of a safe social context where "disorienting dilemmas" can be examined, questioned, and explored, participants were able to develop a new "frame of reference" and reintegrate learning into practice. Kligyte cautions that there are limitations to the framework, such as the possibility that participants will conform to expectations in their reflections. She notes that the "transformation narratives" examined are not a single, final narrative of the self, but a snapshot for further exploration. Kligyte's findings are similar to S. Fletcher's: that transformative learning helps to make sense of a complex and often ambiguous work environment, which requires multiple selves.

=== The role of the learner ===
The educator becomes a facilitator when the goal of learning is for learners to construct knowledge about themselves, others, and social norms. As a result, learners play an important role in the learning environment and process. Learners must create norms within the classroom that include civility, respect, and responsibility for helping one another learn. Learners must welcome diversity within the learning environment and aim for peer collaboration.

Learners must become critical of their own assumptions in order to transform their unquestioned frame of reference. Through communicative learning, learners must work towards critically reflecting on assumptions that underlie intentions, values, beliefs, and feelings. Learners are involved in objective re-framing of their frames of reference when they critically reflect on the assumptions of others. In contrast, subjective re-framing occurs when learners critically assess their own assumptions.

The role of the learner involves actively participating in discourse. Through discourse, learners are able to validate what is being communicated to them. This dialogue provides the opportunity to critically examine evidence, arguments, and alternate points of view, which fosters collaborative learning.

=== The role of the rational and the affective ===
Transformative learning has two components that at times seem to be in conflict: the cognitive, rational, and objective and the intuitive, imaginative, and subjective. Both the rational and the affective play a role in transformative learning. Although the emphasis has been on transformative learning as a rational process, teachers need to consider how they can help students use feelings and emotions both in critical reflection and as a means of reflection.

There are a number of educational and research institutions that are based on the principles of transformative learning. Some examples include the Transformative Studies Institute and The Transformative Learning Centre at the Ontario Institute for Studies in Education (OISE) of the University of Toronto.

Evidence is emerging on the applicability of transformative theory in new educational programmes, in business and industry education, health professional education, community education such as courses offered by the YMCA, and informal settings such as self-help groups. Phil Bamber and Les Hankin describe how students in a service-learning section experienced perspective transformation and shifts of their world-view when their training was influenced by transformative learning theory.

Susan Imel states that transformative learning may not always be a goal of education, but its importance should not be overlooked. Educators should strive to understand it, even if they choose not to foster it.

== See also ==
- Critical pedagogy
- Transformative Experience
