= Sumantra Ghoshal =

Indian management theorist (1948–2004)

- Born: 26 September 1948; Kolkata, India
- Died: 3 March 2004 (age 55); Hampstead, United Kingdom
- Education: Delhi University; Indian Institute of Social Welfare and Business Management; Harvard Business School; MIT Sloan School of Management
- Spouse: Sushmita Ghoshal
- Children: 2
- Scientific career
- Fields: Strategic and International Management
- Workplaces: London Business School

Sumantra Ghoshal was an Indian scholar and educator. He served as a professor of strategic and international management at the London Business School, and was the founding Dean of the Indian School of Business in Hyderabad. Ghoshal met Christopher Bartlett while he was a PhD student at Harvard. Both of whom have gone on to become frequent contributors at Harvard Business Review and both have collaborated in writing several influential books and articles relating to leadership and organization managements.

His Managing Across Borders: The Transnational Solution, co-authored with Christopher A. Bartlett, has been listed in the Financial Times as one of the 50 most influential management books, and has been translated into nine languages.

== Biography ==
Born in Calcutta, Ghoshal attended the Ballygaunge Government High School, and graduated from Delhi University with Physics major and at the Indian Institute of Social Welfare and Business Management.

Ghoshal started his career in industry. He worked for Indian Oil Corporation, rising through the management ranks before moving to the United States on a Fulbright Fellowship and Humphrey Fellowship in 1981. Ghoshal was awarded an S.M. and a PhD from the MIT Sloan School of Management in 1983 and 1985 respectively, and was also awarded a D.B.A. degree from Harvard Business School in 1986. He worked on these degrees at the same time, writing two distinct dissertations on two different topics.

Ghoshal specialized in Strategic and International Management, often talked about leadership structures and organizational change in large multinational entities. He made a significant contribution to the field of management. He was an influential figure serving on various editorial boards of distinguished journals such as the Academy of Management Review and the European Management Journal. Ghoshal played a significant role in major companies in India and globally, serving as the Chairman Supervisory Board of Duncan-Goenka and held a position on the board of entities like Mahindra-British Telecom.

In 1985, Ghoshal joined INSEAD Business School in France and wrote a stream of influential articles and books. In 1994, he joined the London Business School. Ghoshal was a Fellow of the Advanced Institute of Management Research (AIM) in the United Kingdom and a professor of strategic and international management at the London Business School. He served as a member of The Committee of Overseers of the Harvard Business School.

=== Awards ===
- The Differential Network: Organizing the Multinational Corporation for Value Creation, a book he co-authored with Nitin Nohria, won the George Terry Book Award in 1997.
- The Individualized Corporation:A Fundamentally New Approach to Management, co-authored with Christopher A. Bartlett, won the Igor Ansoff Award in 1997, and has been translated into seven languages.
- His last book Managing Radical Change, won the Management Book of the Year award in India. He was described by The Economist as 'Euroguru'.
- He ranks 40th on the list of Top 50 business intellectuals published by the Accenture consulting company in 2002.
- In 2002, Ghosha and Bartlett were presented with the Award on Leadership and Corporate Governance from the Association of Executive Search and Leadership Consultants (AESC) for their collaborative article "Building Competitive Advantage Through People."

== Work ==
Ghoshal developed most of his theories from his personal interactions with managers worldwide. Ghoshal made a controversial theory that companies should not be involve in corporate social responsibilities describing it as "old, tired, and to my mind, useless". He explains that building infrastructure should be the responsibility of the government. Ghoshal concluded his explanation by saying job creation, innovation, and economic prosperity is itself a significant societal contribution.

Ghoshal's early work focused on the matrix structure in multinational organizations, and the "conflict and confusion" that reporting along both geographical and functional lines created. His later work is more ambitious, and hence perhaps more important – the idea that it is necessary to halt economics from taking over management. This, he theorised, is important since firms do not play on the periphery of human life today, but have taken a central role.

=== Forms of the international enterprise ===
In collaboration with Christopher A. Bartlett, Ghoshal researched successful enterprises on international markets. They found three types of internationalization, differing in structural approach and strategic capabilities. The types were dubbed Multinational, Global and International.

	Multinational Enterprise	Global Enterprise	International Enterprise
Strategic competency	responsiveness	efficiency i.e. output per unit of input	transfer of learning
Structures	loose federations of enterprises; national subsidiaries solve all operative tasks and some strategical.	tightly centralized enterprise; national subsidiaries primarily seen as distribution centres; all strategic and many operative decisions centralized	Somewhere in between multinational and global enterprises; some strategic areas centralized, some decentralized
Samples	Unilever, ITT	Exxon, Toyota	IBM, Ericsson

Due to an ever-faster changing environment, Bartlett and Ghoshal see a further need for adaptation with a drive toward a company, that masters not one, but all three of the strategic capabilities of the named types. The ideal-type thus created, they dubbed the transnational enterprise.

=== The Multinational Corporation as an Interorganizational Network. ===
In 1990, Ghoshal and Bartlett argues in their article with the Academy of Management Review that major multinational entities will be better understood if they portray themselves as interorganizational alliances, instead of considering itself as one big organization. They also suggested that multinational corporation should be viewed as a network of communication between its headquarters and various international branches.

=== The Essence of Megacorporations. ===
in 1995, Ghoshal co-authored an article with Moran, P., Almeida-Costa, L., titled "The Essence of the Megacorporations", arguing that megacorporation internal structures should not be view solely on hierarchy and that hierarchy are not the critical elements of internal governance. They continued with their theory, maintaining that company should create an institutional context that motivates individuals to act in the organization's best interests, rather than relying solely on hierarchical control. The article was published with the Journal of Institutional and Theoretical Economics (JITE).

=== Beyond Strategy to Purpose. ===
Ghoshal and Bartlett co-authored an article titled "Beyond Strategy to Purpose" with the Harvard Business Review where they argued that if a company's values are only self-serving, they lose appeal to both employees and customers. They also insinuated that companies should shift from a purely transactional relationship with their employees to one that fosters mutual respect, commitment, and a sense of belonging. Arguing such an approach will create a mutually beneficial work environment and overall productivity of the organization.

=== Management context and individual behavior model ===
Also with Bartlett in 1997, Ghoshal set up a management context and individual behavior model highlighting a context shaped by stretch, trust, support, and discipline. They identified that kind of context as a cornerstone that elicits behaviours of the individual which contribute to an organisation's self-renewal, allowing the organisation to be vigorous and energetic.

=== Bad Management Theories are Destroying Good Management Practices. ===
In his final article with the Academy of Management Learning and Education published in 2005, Ghoshal attributed the recent downward trend of organization practices are a reflection of how research and studies are carried out in the field of business and managements. Ghoshal explains that by promoting theories driven by a particular ideology that lacks moral grounding, business schools have inadvertently absolved their students from ethical accountability. Ghoshal is in the school of thoughts that management theorists should not treat the study of business as physical science because field of business management and physical science are fundamentally different.

== Death ==
Ghoshal died March 3, 2004, at a London hospital after a 11-day battle with double brain hemorrhage. Julian Birkinshaw, a fellow professor at the London Business School, remembered Ghoshal's warning that large organizations could lose their legitimacy unless they actively contribute positively to the world. While paying tribute to Ghoshal, Birkinshaw highlighted Ghoshal's revolutionary approach to traditional management principles. Ghoshal advocated for a compassionate corporate culture that empowered individual workers, viewing them as entrepreneurs, fundamental to any organization. Many of his colleagues saw him as a pleasant unorthodox thinker, consistently challenging prevailing theories and emphasizing the significance of the individual entrepreneur in corporate life. Ghoshal was married to his wife Sushmita, with whom they had two sons Anand and Siddharth. After his death in 2004, The Economist published an article where they described him as a man of boundless energy and inventfullness.

=== Legacy ===
Ghoshal's treatment of management issues at the level of the individual led him to conclude that management theory that focuses on the economic aspects of man to the exclusion of all others is incorrect at best. According to him, "A theory that assumes that managers cannot be relied upon by shareholders can make managers less reliable."

Such theory, Ghoshal warned, would become a self-fulfilling prophecy, a particularly stinging critique of the output of a majority of his colleagues in business schools that made him controversial. To his death, his fight was against the "narrow idea" that led to today's management theory being "undersocialized and one-dimensional, a parody of the human condition more appropriate to a prison or a madhouse than an institution which should be a force for good."

== Publications ==
Ghoshal published 10 books, over 70 articles, and several award-winning case studies. Books, a selection:

- Bartlett, Christopher A.; Ghoshal, Sumantra (1999). Managing across borders: The transnational solution. Vol. 2. Harvard Business School Press.
- Bartlett, Christopher A., and Sumantra Ghoshal. Transnational management. Vol. 4. McGraw Hill, 2000.

Articles, a selection:

- Ghoshal, Sumantra. "Global strategy: An organizing framework." Strategic management journal 8.5 (1987): 425–440.
- Ghoshal, Sumantra, and Christopher A. Bartlett. "The multinational corporation as an inter-organizational network." Academy of management review 15.4 (1990): 603–626.
- Ghoshal, Sumantra, and Peter Moran. "Bad for practice: A critique of the transaction cost theory." Academy of management Review 21.1 (1996): 13–47.
- Tsai, Wenpin, and Sumantra Ghoshal. "Social capital and value creation: The role of intrafirm networks." Academy of management Journal 41.4 (1998): 464–476.
- Nahapiet, Janine, and Sumantra Ghoshal. "Social capital, intellectual capital, and the organizational advantage." Academy of management review 23.2 (1998): 242–266.
- Ghoshal, Sumantra. "Bad management theories are destroying good management practices." Academy of Management Learning & Education 4.1 (2005): 75–91.
- Rocha, Hector and Ghoshal, Sumantra. "Beyond Self-Interest Revisited." Journal of Management Studies 43(3) (2006): 585–619.
- Bartlett, C. A., & Ghoshal, S. (1994). Changing the role of top management: Beyond strategy to purpose. Harvard business review, 72(6), 79–88.
- Bartlett, C. A., & Ghoshal, S. (1987). Managing across borders: new strategic requirements. Sloan management review, 28(4), 7–17.
- Bartlett, C. A., & Ghoshal, S. (2002). Building competitive advantage through people. MIT Sloan management review.
- Bartlett, C. A., & Ghoshal, S. (1993). Beyond the M‐form: Toward a managerial theory of the firm. Strategic Management Journal, 14(S2), 23–46.
- Lovas, B., & Ghoshal, S. (2000). Strategy as guided evolution. Strategic management journal, 21(9), 875–896.
- Ghoshal, S. (1987). Global strategy: An organizing framework. Strategic management journal, 8(5), 425–440.
- Bartlett, C. A., & Ghoshal, S. (2000). Going global: lessons from late movers. Reading, 1(3), 75–84.
- Bartlett, C. A., & Ghoshal, S. (1988). Organizing for worldwide effectiveness: The transnational solution. California management review, 31(1), 54–74.
- Ghoshal, S., & Bartlett, C. A. (1995). Changing the role of management. Harvard Business Review, 73(1), 86–96.
- Ghoshal featured on the list of The Case Centre's all-time top authors list (covering 40 years) released in 2014.
