= Thelma Babbitt =

American activist

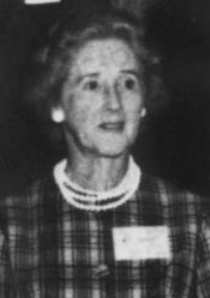
- Thelma Babbitt, from a 1966 publication of the US Department of State
- Born: Thelma Wright; October 9, 1906; Natick, Massachusetts
- Died: February 18, 2004; Hancock, New Hampshire
- Other names: Thelma W. Chickering (during first marriage)
- Occupation(s): Civil rights activist, environmentalist, clubwoman
- Children: 1, Arthur W. Chickering

Thelma Wright Babbitt (October 9, 1906 – February 18, 2004) was an American civil rights and environmental activist, best known for her work with the League of Women Voters and the American Friends Service Committee in the 1950s and 1960s, and with the Sierra Club and the Harris Center in the 1970s and later.

== Early life ==
Thelma Wright was born in Natick, Massachusetts, the daughter of George R. Wright and Bertha Wright. Her father was an electrical contractor. She graduated from Chandler Secretarial School in Boston in 1928.

== Career ==
Babbitt was a delegate to the Congress of the International Alliance of Women, held in Amsterdam in 1949. She was active as vice president of the Cambridge, Massachusetts chapter of the League of Women Voters, and co-chair of the League's School of International Relations. "The success of a democracy depends on the individual being active and understanding and assuming his responsibility," she noted in a 1951 interview.

Babbitt was raised as a Methodist, but was a member of the Germantown Quaker Meeting in Pennsylvania from 1956 to 1964, and of the Monadnock Quaker Meeting in New Hampshire, beginning in 1964. With the American Friends Service Committee, Babbitt worked especially on fair housing in Philadelphia, employment issues in Mexico, and a stint as an organizer with the Arkansas Council on Human Relations in Little Rock, Arkansas from 1957 to 1960. "This is a problem for the entire country," she said of ongoing clashes over school desegregation in 1960. "People who see immorality in the South must challenge it. When national laws are flaunted, that is everyone's concern." She also worked in the Quaker office at the United Nations, and served on a Foreign Service Officer Selection Board for the US State Department in 1966. In 1973, she toured South America in a group of twenty American women activists, and met Isabel Peron.

Babbitt founded a chapter of the Sierra Club for Southern New Hampshire, and served on its board of trustees. In 1977, she chaired the Sierra Club's North East Regional Conservation Committee task force, to oppose construction of a new highway across New Hampshire and Vermont. She was an avid birder and hiker, and a successful fundraiser. She was a founder and trustee of the Harris Center for Conservation Education in New Hampshire. A room at the Harris Center was named for Babbitt in 2003.

== Personal life ==
Thelma Wright married Rowell Chickering; they had a son, educational researcher Arthur W. Chickering, before they divorced in 1937. She married her second husband, businessman George King Babbitt, in 1945; he died in 1951. She died in 2004 after a fall, aged 97 years, at her home in Hancock, New Hampshire.
