= Thinking environment =

Philosophy of communication

The thinking environment is a philosophy of communication, based on the work of Nancy Kline. It is a practical series of values-based applications which are useful in family, campaigning, community and organisational life, as well as forming the basis of a teaching pedagogy and coaching approach.

A thinking environment exists when the "ten components", or "principles", are held in place by a facilitator. The components are attention, appreciation, ease, encouragement, difference, information, feelings, equality, place and incisive questions.

With the components in place, the facilitator then chooses an "application" of the thinking environment, with the agreement of participants. These include a form of coaching (known as the “Thinking Partnership"), “Thinking Rounds", “Thinking Pairs", “Transforming Meetings", “Mentoring", “Time to Think Council", “Chairing”, "Dialogue", “Presenting” and “Open discussion".
