= Student development theories =

Topic in educational psychology

Student development theory refers to a body of scholarship that seeks to understand and explain the developmental processes of how students learn, grow, and develop in post-secondary education. Student development theory has been defined as a “collection of theories related to college students that explain how they grow and develop holistically, with increased complexity, while enrolled in a postsecondary educational environment”.

Early ideas about student development were informed by the larger disciplines of psychology and sociology. Some student development theories are informed by educational psychology that theorizes how students gain knowledge in post-secondary educational environments.

There are many theorists that make up early student development theories, such as Arthur Chickering's 7 vectors of identity development, William Perry's theory of intellectual development, Lawrence Kohlberg's theory of moral development, David A. Kolb's theory of experiential learning, and Nevitt Sanford's theory of challenge and support.

Student developmental theories are typically understood within theoretical categories of psychosocial, cognitive-structural, person-environment, typology, maturity, social identity, integrative theories, and critical theory frameworks.

Student development theories can be understood as evolving across 3 generational waves. First wave developmental theories, often cited as foundational, tended to view student development as universal for all students. First wave theories primarily focus on students’ psychosocial and cognitive-structural development, as well as examining the impact of the campus environment. Second wave theories advanced the developmental focus of the first wave to examine more closely the diversity of student populations and students experiences of social identities across gender, sexuality, race, and ethnicity. Second wave theories brought attention to the socially constructed nature of social identities as well as to the historical exclusion of diverse groups of students from student development theories. Second wave theories may include, Marcia Baxter Magolda's theory of self-authorship, Carol Gilligan's theory of women's moral development, in addition to other social identity and multidimensional identity theories.

Third wave theories re-examine student development theory through critical theory and post-structural perspectives. Critical frameworks are used to analyze structures of power, privilege, and oppression in order to call attention to systemic inequality, transformative practices, and social justice. Critical theoretical perspectives that have been used to re-examine student development theory have included, intersectionality, critical race theory, black feminist thought, feminist theory, queer theory, postcolonialism, and poststructuralism. Critical perspectives in the third wave also contribute to the ongoing growth and expansion of the body of student development theories themselves.

Student development theories may be used by post-secondary educators and student affairs professionals to better understand and address student needs as well as to guide student affairs practices and policies that impact student development.

== History ==
The earliest manifestation of student development theory—or tradition—in Europe was in loco parentis. Loosely translated, this concept refers to the manner in which children's schools acted on behalf of and in partnership with parents for the moral and ethical development and improvement of students' character development. Ostensibly this instruction emphasized traditional Christian values through strict rules, enforced by rigid discipline. As such, the primary objective of in loco parentis was on the conditioning of social and individual behavior, rather than intellectual cultivation.

The second distinct shift toward a unified student development theory emerged in the late nineteenth century, through the first quarter of the twentieth century, marked by the growth of colleges and universities throughout Europe and the United States, simultaneous with the development of social science disciplines like psychology. By mid-twentieth century, behavioral psychologists such as B.F. Skinner and Carl Rogers influenced educational theory and policy, and a new paradigm emerged known as the Student Services paradigm. As the name indicates, the "student services" perspective said that students ought to be provided with the services that benefit knowledge acquisition.

By the mid-twentieth century, the service paradigm started to be replaced with the student development paradigm. This paradigm was influenced by the growing body of psychological and sociological theories, reflecting the idea that students learn both in-class and out-of-class, and are influenced both by their genetics and social environment (see nature and nurture).

Basic assumptions guiding the student development movement:

1. Each student is a different individual with unique needs.
2. The entire environment of the student should be taken into account and used for education.
3. Student has a personal responsibility for getting educated.

== Student Development Theories ==
=== Categories ===
Student development theories generally can be divided into five categories:

1. Psychosocial. Psychosocial theories focus on long-term issues that tend to occur in sequence and are correlated with chronological age, concentrating on individuals progress through various 'life stages' by accomplishing certain deeds.
2. Cognitive-structural. Cognitive-structural theories address how students perceive and rationalize their experiences.
3. Person–environment. Person–environment theories address interaction between conceptualizations of the college student and the college environment, looking at behavior as a social function of the person and the environment. Those theories are particularly common in career planning.
4. Humanistic existential. Humanistic existential theories concentrate on certain philosophical concepts about human nature: freedom, responsibility, self-actualization and that education and personal growth are encouraged by self-disclosure, self-acceptance and self-awareness. These theories are used extensively in counseling.
5. Student development process models. Student development process models can be divided into abstract and practical.

There are dozens of theories falling into these five families. Among the most known are:

- Arthur W. Chickering's theory of identity development
- William G. Perry's cognitive theory of student development

=== Schlossberg's transition theory ===
Schlossberg's transition theory has been worked on over time and has changed some of it original context. This theory is mostly based on the individual and what they consider to be a transition in their life. This theory is used as a guideline from what steps should be taken during the transition to help the young adult to continue to work on and transition into what they need. We use different questionnaires to determine and assess the ability of a certain person to cope with the transition. Here is a quick review of the steps and ideas behind Schlossberg's theory:

Transitions

- Events or nonevents resulting in changed relationships, routines, assumptions, or even roles
- Meaning for the individual based on
  - Type: anticipated, unanticipated, nonevent
  - Context: relationship to transition and the setting
  - Impact: alterations in daily life

The transition process

- Reactions over time
- Moving in, moving through, and moving out

Coping with transitions

- Influenced by ration or assets and liabilities in regard to four sets of factors:
  - Situation: trigger, timing, control, role change, duration, previous experience, concurrent stress, assessment
  - Self: personal and demographic characteristics, psychological resources
  - Support: types, functions, measurement
  - Strategies: categories, coping modes

=== Kohlberg's theory of moral development ===
Using ideas of Piaget and cognitive development Kohlberg looks into the judgments of people and what they consider justifiable to determine about their ideas of Morality come into play. Using only these ideas, not culture, we see how people develop their own moral code and how it changes or stays the same over time.

Stages of Kohlberg's moral development theory

- Level I: Preconventional
  - Stage One: Heteronomous morality: Obeying rules so not to be punished (focus more on self than the other)
  - Stage Two: Individualistic, instrumental morality: Focusing on only following the rules that benefit themselves.
- Level II: Conventional
  - Stage Three: Interpersonally normative morality: The person begins to start living up to the expectations of the important people around them. (i.e.: friends, parents, teachers)
  - Stage Four: Social system morality: We begin to realize that everyone has morals and we live in the society's morals established by the people in it.
- Level III: Postconventional or Principled
  - Stage Five: Human rights and social welfare morality: Being able to depend on everyone around to carry out the social justices and entering groups to maintain these ideas that the individual holds as well.
  - Stage Six: Morality of universalizable, reversible, and prescriptive general ethical principles: Coming up with generalized morals that can apply to everyone and everything that the individual does.

=== Kolb's theory of experiential learning ===
Looking at how individuals learn is a huge part in the development of self according to Kolb and his model. By knowing what the individual needs to do to learn makes it easier for the individual to grow as a person. Using the different personality types and ways to learn, we become more self-aware and willing to learn from new ways.

Kolb's cycle of learning

- Concrete Experience (CE): Full and unbiased involvement in learning experience
- Reflective Observation (RO): Contemplation of one's experiences from various perspectives
- Abstract Conceptualization (AC): Idea formulation and integration
- Active Experiment (AE): Incorporation of new ideas into action

Kolb's learning style model

- Accommodator (CE + RO):
  - Is action oriented and at ease with people, prefers trial-and-error problem solving
  - Is good at carrying out plans, is open to new experiences, adapts easily to change
- Diverger (RO + AC):
  - Is people- and feeling-oriented
  - Has imagination and is aware of meaning and values, is good at generating and analyzing alternatives
- Converger (AC + AE):
  - Prefers technical tasks over social or interpersonal settings
  - Excels at problem solving, decision making, and practical applications
- Assimilator (AC + RO):
  - Emphasizes ideas rather than people
  - Is good at inductive reasoning, creating theoretical models, and integrating observations

=== Sanford's theory of challenge and support ===
Sanford's theory of challenge and support states that for optimal student developmental growth in a college environment, challenges they experience must be met with supports that can sufficiently tolerate the stress of the challenge itself. Nevitt Sanford, a psychologist, was a scholar who theorized about the process college students would encounter throughout their college development. He addressed the relationship between the student and their college environment. Sanford proposed three developmental conditions: readiness, challenge, and support.

1. Readiness refers to internal processes associated with maturation or beneficial environmental factors. This condition of readiness can aid a student's developmental growth if he or she is physically or psychologically ready. If not, it could limit their developmental growth.
2. Challenge refers to situations in which an individual does not have the skills, knowledge, or attitude to cope.
3. Support refers to buffers in the environment that help the individual to successfully meet challenges. Sanford speculated that if students are met with too much challenge, they could regress in their developmental growth and give up on the challenge at hand.

For example, in a review by the University of California, Los Angeles, Chaves discussed the juggling of multiple challenges that adult student learners encounter such as integration into an institution, commuting to campus, social integration, and absence from school for a number of years that cause adult student learners to regress in their time to graduation or not graduate at all.

If students are met with excessive support, they may not understand what they need and their development would be limited. For example, in a qualitative study grounded in constructivist theory methodology, Marx concluded that college campuses provided too much support, limiting students' forward movement in their ability to internally define their own beliefs, identity, and relationships during college. In both studies, the research indicated that students were unable to reach optimal developmental growth without the appropriate amount of challenge or support.

It is likely that most students will face an academic, social, or personal challenge during their postsecondary college or university journey. Research shows that challenges are different for traditional age students and adult student learners, various marginalized and majority identity groups, international students, students in specific learning communities, and numerous other characteristics. Research indicates that support for students can be in the form of mentoring and involvement from faculty, staff, family, and peers, ability to be involved in meaningful college activity, believing they matter, and designing their own curriculum or programs, among other support options. When challenges are met with appropriate support, students' developmental growth in a college environment is optimal. For example, a longitudinal study conducted by Ong, Phinney, and Dennis examined 123 Latino college students attending an ethnically diverse urban university in southern California. These Latino students faced challenges of being low socioeconomic status (SES), psychological stress, feelings of alienation, and low rates of college retention. However, these students were met with consistent parental support, family interdependence, and an affirmation of their membership in their ethnic group. The support correlated positively to an increased grade point average and greater academic achievement, resilience, and positive adaptation.

Disability Identity Development In College Students

The importance of accommodation for students with disabilities as grown substantially since the turn of the millennium. Disability was once viewed as resulting from a moral lapse, such as poor actions of parents, resulting in having a child with disabilities. Post Secondary institutions historically viewed disability from the lens of the medical model, whether it is curable or incurable by medicine. More recently institutions are beginning to view disability as a limitation of the social and physical environments and not a limitation of the individual. For example, stairs are a limitation for individuals who have mobility issues, but ramps are accessible to individuals with and without a mobility limitation. Refitting institutional design to this view is a result of a change in adopted model of disability.

Stage Models of Disability Identity

Gibson (2006) identified a three staged model to describe the trajectories of disabled students and how they come to understand themselves inclusive of their disability.

Stage 1: Passive Awareness (childhood)

· Individual's medical needs are met however they avoid attention and avoids associating with other disabled individuals.

Stage 2: Realization (Adolescence/ Early Adulthood)

· Begins to view themselves as having a disability and may experience self-hate, and become more socially aware of how their disability impacts the perceptions that others have of them.

Stage 3: Acceptance (Adulthood)

· Begins to understand their differences in a positive way and integrate themselves into the able-bodied world. Will also incorporate other individuals with disabilities into their lives.

These stages can be fluid, meaning movement from one stage to another does not mean it is a permanent move. For students in stage three an event such as moving to on campus residence and have to share a bedroom or bathroom may move them back to stage 2.

Building off of this model proposed by Gibson (2006), Forber-Pratt and Aragon (2013) proposed a four staged model:

Stage 1: Acceptance

· Student undergoes a process of accepting their disability which includes denial, anger, bargaining, depression and eventually acceptance. This includes acceptance of the disability from friends, family, and educators.

Stage 2: Relationship Phase

· Begins to interact with students with disabilities and learn the norms and activities of the group. Creating connection to others with disabilities is the key component of this stage.

Stage 3: Adoption

· Begins to internalize the core values of the disability culture. Being independent by navigating the world and managing personal hygiene and participating in social justice whether this be self advocacy or collective activism.

Stage 4: Giving Back to Community Phase

· Become leaders in disability culture and demonstrate role modelling behaviour for other students with disabilities.

=== Combining theories ===
Student development theories, such as Sanford's theory of challenge and support, are not meant to be used alone in practice. It is important to acknowledge that multiple theories, such as Astin's involvement theory, Chickering's theory of identity development, Kohlberg's theory of moral development, Rendon's theory of validation, Schlossberg's theory of mattering and marginality, Schlossberg's transition theory, among others, can be cross pollinated in an individual student's situation. Often the intersection of many student development theories is what is most effective in working with postsecondary college or university student environments.
