= Chickering's theory of identity development =

Theory in developmental psychology

Chickering's Theory of Identity Development, as articulated by Arthur W. Chickering explains the process of identity development. The theory was created specifically to examine the identity development process of students in higher education, but it has been used in other areas as well.

== History ==
During his employment at Goddard College, Chickering started in on the research for his theory. The research, which he began in 1959 and finished in 1969, involved surveying college students. The students were traditional in age, and were enrolled as sophomores through senior. Chickering was involved with the Project on Student Development in Small Colleges, which allowed him to collect additional data from other schools and compile it with the data from his own. In 1969, he published Education and Identity which explained his new theory of student development. His work was revisited and updated in 1972 and again in 1993 in cooperation with Linda Reisser.

== Overview ==
Chickering's theory focuses primarily on identity development. It examines this by means of seven vectors of development which contribute to the development of identity:

- Developing competence
- Managing emotions
- Moving through autonomy toward interdependence
- Developing mature interpersonal relationships
- Establishing identity
- Developing purpose
- Developing integrity

These vectors can be thought of as a series of stages or tasks that deal with feeling, thinking, believing, and relating to others. Individuals may progress through the vectors at different rates. The vectors have a tendency to interact with each other, and this can cause reevaluation of issues associated with vectors that had already been worked through. Although the vectors do build on one another, the vectors do not follow a strict sequential order. Developing in multiple vectors allows individuals to function with greater stability and intellectual complexity.

=== Developing competence ===
In Education and Identity, Chickering and Reisser use the analogy of the three-tined pitchfork to describe competence. The tines are intellectual competence, physical competence, and interpersonal competence. The handle of the pitchfork represents the sense of competence that comes from the knowledge that the individual is able to achieve goals and cope with adverse circumstances.

=== Managing emotions ===
This vector consists of learning to understand, accept, and express emotions. Individuals learn how to appropriately act on feelings that they are experiencing. In his more recent work, Chickering's theory was broad and covered emotions including anxiety, depression, guilt, anger, shame along with positive emotions such as inspiration and optimism. In his original work, he focused primarily on aggression and sexual desires.

=== Moving through autonomy toward interdependence ===
The successful achievement of this vector involves learning how to be emotionally independent. This includes becoming free from the consistent need for comfort, affirmation, and approval from others. Individuals also see growth in problem solving abilities, initiative, and self-direction. They begin to understand that they are part of a whole. They are autonomous, but interdependent on others in society.

In Chickering's updated theory, much more emphasis is placed on interdependence.

=== Developing mature interpersonal relationships ===
In this vector, individuals learn to appreciate and understand others. Some of the related tasks include cross-cultural tolerance and appreciation for the differences of others. An individual also becomes competent in developing and maintaining long-term intimate relationships. Chickering moved this up to list of vectors in his revised edition in order show the importance of developing relationships.

=== Establishing identity ===
This vector builds on each of the ones which comes before it. It involves becoming comfortable with oneself. This includes physical appearance, gender and sexual identity, ethnicity, and social roles. It also includes becoming stable and gaining self-esteem. A person who has a well-developed identity can handle feedback and criticism from others.

=== Developing purpose ===
In this vector, an individual develops commitment to the future and becomes more competent at making and following through on decisions, even when they may be contested. It involves developing a sense of life vocation. It may involve the creation of goals, and is influenced by the family and lifestyle of the individual.

=== Developing integrity ===
This vector consists of three stages which flow in chronological order, but are able to overlap. These stages are humanizing values, personalizing value, and developing congruence. The process of humanizing values encompasses the shift from a cold, stiff value system to one which is more balanced with the interests of others matched with the interests of the self. After this is established, the individual begins to assemble a core group of personal values which are firmly held, but the beliefs of others are considered and respected. Developing congruence involves bringing actions in line with beliefs.
