= Chris Bartlett (musician) =

American singer-songwriter

Christopher Everette Bartlett (born October 28, 1981) is an American guitarist, music teacher, author and singer-songwriter. Originally from Macon, Georgia, he briefly attended Georgia College and State University where he refined his skills and gained a following. As a performer he tours the Southeastern United States. At Young America Music Schools in Macon he is a respected teacher of voice, guitar and bass guitar methods.

In the fall of 2005, Bartlett began taking students for guitar and voice at Young America Music Schools, where he still teaches music today along with bandmate and colleague Matt Moncrief. The number of his students varies with the change of the academic and touring season. As a teacher, Bartlett has made many innovations in modern guitar and voice method and is currently authoring a series of method books based on his findings.

In March 2006 Bartlett signed a recording contract with Explo-Sound Records based in Atlanta, Georgia. The production on Bartlett's self-titled debut album was completed in December 2006 and released to the public on January 12, 2007. Following the success of its international release, Explo-Sound Records and producer Habersham Hall invited Bartlett to record several other projects. Both solo and collaborations with other Explo-Sound Artists are being considered for production.
