= Julian Birkinshaw =

British academic

- Education: Durham University; University of Western Ontario
- Occupation: Academic

Julian Birkinshaw FBA, FAcSS (born 16 October 1964) is a British academic. He is Professor of Strategy and Entrepreneurship at the London Business School, where he is the Academic Director of the Deloitte Institute of Innovation and Entrepreneurship. He is the author of four books on management. In February 2024 he was appointed the Dean of Ivey Business School at Western University. He assumed the position on 1 August 2024.

== Early life ==
Julian Birkinshaw earned a BSc in Geology from Durham University, followed by a Master of Business Administration and PhD from the Ivey Business School at the University of Western Ontario.

== Career ==
Birkinshaw is Professor of Strategy and Entrepreneurship at the London Business School, where he is the Academic Director of the Deloitte Institute of Innovation and Entrepreneurship.

Birkinshaw is the author of four books on management. His first book, Entrepreneurship in the Global Firm, published in 2000, was reviewed by William G. Egelhoff of Fordham University in the Journal of International Business Studies. His fourth book, Becoming a Better Boss: Why Good Management is So Difficult, published in 2013, was reviewed in the Financial Times and the MIT Sloan Management Review.

Birkinshaw was named the Dean of Ivey Business School at the University of Western Ontario in February 2024. He will officially take on the position by August 2024.

== Honours ==
In 2012, Birkinshaw was elected a Fellow of the British Academy (FBA). In 2015, he was elected a Fellow of the Academy of Social Sciences (FAcSS). He is also a Fellow the Academy of International Business, and of the Advanced Institute of Management Research.

== Works ==
=== As an author ===
- Birkinshaw, Julian (2000). Entrepreneurship in the Global Firm. Thousand Oaks, California: SAGE Publications. ISBN 9780761958093. OCLC 43419533.
- Birkinshaw, Julian (2004). Strategic Management. Cheltenham, UK: Edward Elgar Publishing. ISBN 9781843762782. OCLC 57002489.
- Birkinshaw, Julian (2010). Reinventing Management: Smarter Choices for Getting Work Done. San Francisco, California: Jossey-Bass. ISBN 9780470750117. OCLC 522429311.
- Birkinshaw, Julian (2013). Becoming a Better Boss: Why Good Management Is So Difficult. San Francisco, California: Jossey-Bass. ISBN 9781118645468. OCLC 829739779.

=== As a co-author ===
- Birkinshaw, Julian; Crainer, Stuart (2002). Leadership the Sven-Göran Eriksson Way: How to Turn Your Team into Winners. Oxford, UK: Capstone. ISBN 9781841124193. OCLC 50717150.
- Bartlett, Christopher A.; Birkinshaw, Julian; Ghoshal, Sumantra (2004). Transnational Management: Text, Cases, and Readings in Cross-Border Management. Boston, Massachusetts: McGraw-Hill Education. ISBN 9780072482768. OCLC 52178385.
- Birkinshaw, Julian; Mol, Michael (2008). Giant Steps in Management: Creating Innovations That Change the Way We Work. Harlow, UK: Prentice Hall. ISBN 9780273712923. OCLC 165478923.
- Birkinshaw, Julian; Mark, Ken (2015). Key MBA Models: The 60+ Models Every Manager and Business Student Needs to Know. Harlow, UK: Pearson Education. ISBN 9781292016856. OCLC 902986814.

=== As a co-editor ===
- Birkinshaw, Julian; Hood, Neil, eds. (1998). Multinational Corporate Evolution and Subsidiary Development. New York City: St. Martin's Press. ISBN 9780333722893. OCLC 38409935.
- Birkinshaw, Julian; Hagström, Peter, eds. (2000). The Flexible Firm: Capability Management in Network Organizations. Oxford, UK: Oxford University Press. ISBN 9780198296515. OCLC 42833796.
- Birkinshaw, Julian; Ghoshal, Sumantra; Markides, Constantinos C.; Stopford, John M.; Yip, George, eds. (2003). The Future of the Multinational Company. Chichester, UK: John Wiley & Sons. ISBN 9780470850657. OCLC 51966311.
- Birkinshaw, Julian; Piramal, Gita, eds. (2005). Sumantra Ghosal on Management: A Force for Good. Harlow, UK: Prentice Hall. ISBN 9780273701835. OCLC 611576751.
- Birkinshaw, Julian; Gassmann, Oliver; von Zedtwitz, Maximilian, eds. (2008). International management of research and development. Cheltenham, UK: Edward Elgar Publishing. ISBN 9781845424282. OCLC 220003893.
