= Kathleen P. King =

American academic

Kathleen P. King (born in Providence, Rhode Island) is an American author and educator. As of 2006, she was a professor and director of Fordham University's Regional Educational Technology Center (RETC), Center for Professional Development and Program Director of the graduate program in Adult Education and Human Resource Development at the Graduate School of Education.

King's background includes work as a private computer consultant in troubleshooting and training, combining her knowledge of adult education with computer technology in faculty and staff development.

In August 2005, King and Mark Gura created, developed and produced Podcast for Teachers, Techpod (SM), a weekly educational technology professional development podcast for educators. King has developed 5 additional podcasts and collaborated with BXRadio Network to create iLearn Radio, an internet radio station which streams educational podcast content.

Before arriving at Fordham in 1997, King also taught at Widener University, Holy Family College, and the Pennsylvania Institute of Technology. King received her Ed.D. from Widener University.

King has received professional and academic awards, including the Frandson Book Award, (2007); University Continuing Education Association; North American Adult Educators: Phyllis M. Cunningham Archive of Quintessential Autobiographies for the 21st Century. (2007 Recognition); Lawrence S. Levin Achievement Award (2006) from the NYACCE; the POD Network Innovation Award (2005), and Robert J. Menges Honored Research Award from POD Network (2003).
