= Journal of Transformative Education =

- Discipline: Education
- Language: English
- Edited by: Chad Hoggan, Fergal Finnegan, Kaisu Mälkki

Publication details
- History: 2003-present
- Publisher: SAGE Publications
- Frequency: Quarterly

Standard abbreviations
- ISO 4: J. Transform. Educ.

Indexing
- ISSN: 1541-3446 (print); 1552-7840 (web)
- LCCN: 2002214596
- OCLC no.: 300291328

Links
- Journal homepage; Online access; Online archive

The Journal of Transformative Education is a peer-reviewed academic journal that publishes papers four times a year in the field of Education. The journal's editors are Chad Hoggan (North Carolina State University), Fergal Finnegan (National University of Ireland, Maynooth), and Kaisu Mälkki (University of Tampere). It has been in publication since 2003 and is currently published by SAGE Publications.

== Scope ==
The Journal of Transformative Education focuses on advancing the understanding, practice and experience of transformative education. The journal publishes articles that may test, build on and elaborate existing theoretical perspectives. The Journal of Transformative Education aims to explore the international and cross-cultural issues of the theory and practice of transformative learning.

== Abstracting and indexing ==
The Journal of Transformative Education is abstracted and indexed in the following databases:

- Business Source Complete
- Business Source Premier
- SCOPUS
- ZETOC
