= Christopher A. Bartlett =

Australian business theorist

Christopher A. Bartlett (born 1943) is an Australian organizational theorist, and Emeritus Professor of Business Administration at the Harvard Business School, known for his work on multinational corporation and transnational management with Sumantra Ghoshal.

== Life and work ==
Born in Australia, Bartlett obtained his BA in economics at the University of Queensland in 1964, and moved to the United States, where he obtained his MA in business administration from Harvard University, where in 1979 he also obtained his PhD in business administration.

Bartlett started his career in industry in Australia as marketing manager at Alcoa; in England as management consultant for McKinsey & Company; and in France as general manager for Baxter International. After his graduation in 1979 he continued to work for the Harvard Business School, where he eventually was appointed Professor of Business Administration.

Bartlett is elected Fellow of the Academy of Management, the Academy of International Business, and the Strategic Management Society. He was awarded the Distinguished Scholar Award by the Academy of Management in 2001.

In 2002, Bartlett and Ghosal won the Award on Leadership and Corporate Governance from the Association of Executive Search Consultants (AESC) for their article “Building Competitive Advantage Through People.”

In 2012, Bartlett won the European Case Clearing House (ecch) Award in the Economics, Politics and Business Environment category for his case with Carole Carlson, "United Cereal: Lora Brill's Eurobrand Challenge." In 2013, he won again in the same category for "Levendary Café: The China Challenge" (coauthored with Arar Han).

Bartlett's research interests are in the fields of "strategic and organizational challenges confronting managers in large, complex corporations, and on the organizational and managerial impact of transformational change."

Bartlett is a prolific writer of case studies, and Harvard's all-time bestselling case author. He has featured among the top 40 case authors consistently, since the list was first published in 2016 by The Case Centre. Bartlett ranked fourth in 2019/20, fifth In 2018/19, sixth in 2017/18, third in 2016/17 and second In 2015/16. He also featured on the list of The Case Centre's all-time top authors list (covering 40 years) released in 2014.

== Selected publications ==
- Bartlett, Christopher A., and Sumantra Ghoshal. Managing across borders: new strategic requirements. 1987.
- Bartlett, Christopher A., and Sumantra Ghoshal. What is a global manager?. Harvard Business School, 1992.
- Ghoshal, Sumantra, and Christopher A. Bartlett. The individualized corporation. (1997).
- Bartlett, Christopher A., and Sumantra Ghoshal. Managing across borders: The transnational solution. Vol. 2. Harvard Business School Press, 1999.
- Bartlett, Christopher A., and Sumantra Ghoshal. Transnational management. Vol. 4. McGraw Hill, 2000.

Articles selection

- Bartlett, Christopher A. "Building and managing the transnational: The new organizational challenge." Competition in global industries (1986): 367–401.
- Ghoshal, Sumantra, and Christopher A. Bartlett. "Creation, adoption, and diffusion of innovations by subsidiaries of multinational corporations." Journal of International Business Studies (1988): 365–388.
- Ghoshal, Sumantra, and Christopher A. Bartlett. "The multinational corporation as an interorganizational network." Academy of management review 15.4 (1990): 603–626.
- Bartlett, Christopher A., and Sumantra Ghoshal. "Beyond the M-form: Toward a managerial theory of the firm." Strategic Management Journal 14.S2 (1993): 23–46.
- Bartlett, Christopher A., and Sumantra Ghoshal. "Beyond strategy to purpose." Harvard Business Review (1994): 79–88.
- Bartlett, Christopher A., and Sumantra Ghoshal. "Building Competitive Advantage Through People." MIT Sloan Management Review 43, no. 2 (winter 2002): 34–41.
