= Jack Mezirow =

American sociologist and educator (1923–2014)

Jack Mezirow (1923 - September 24, 2014) was an American sociologist and Emeritus Professor of Adult and Continuing Education at Teachers College, Columbia University.

Mezirow received his B.A. and M.A. Degree in Social Sciences and Education from the University of Minnesota, and his Ed.D. Degree in Adult Education from the University of California, Los Angeles. He was an Emeritus Professor of Adult and Continuing Education at Teachers College, Columbia University, New York, and the founder of the Adult Education Guided Intensive Study (AEGIS) doctoral program at Teachers College, Columbia University.

== Work ==
Mezirow was influenced by Paulo Freire and Jürgen Habermas. He was widely acknowledged as the founder of the concept of transformative learning.

== Perspective transformation ==
Mezirow began his theory of perspective transformation when he studied adult women who chose to re-enter higher education. Mezirow's initial research and further study led him to surmise that adults do not simply make application of old ways of learning to new situations - instead they "discover a need to acquire new perspectives in order to gain a more complete understanding of changing events". Mezirow then coined this "reflective-change-action" process as Perspective Transformation. Mezirow continued to find consistencies in the adult learners he studied. He then identified 10 stages that adult learners encounter as they experience perspective transformations.

== Works ==
- 1990. Fostering Critical reflection in adulthood, Jossey-Bass Inc
- 1991. Transformative Dimensions of Adult Learning, Jossey-Bass Inc
- 2000. Learning as transformation: Critical Perspectives on a theory in Progress, Jossey-Bass Inc
- 2009. Transformative Learning in Practice: Insights from Community, Workplace and Education, Jossey-Bass Inc
