= Arthur W. Chickering =

American educational researcher

- Born: April 27, 1927; Natick, Massachusetts
- Died: August 15, 2020 (aged 93); East Montpelier, Vermont
- Education: B.A. Modern Comparative Literature - Wesleyan University (1950) M.A. degree English Education - Graduate School of Education, Harvard University (1951) Ph.D. degree School Psychology - Teachers College, Columbia University. (1959) M.F.A degree in creative writing - Goddard College, 2012.
- Occupations: Special Assistant to the President, Professor of Educational Leadership and Human Development, Author, Researcher
- Relatives: Thelma Babbitt (mother)
- Writing career
- Subject: Student Affairs
- Notable works: Education and Identity

Arthur Wright Chickering (April 27, 1927 – August 15, 2020) was an American educational researcher in the field of student affairs. He was known for his contribution to student development theories. In 1990 he was appointed Dean of the Graduate School of Education at George Mason University. He was succeeded in 1992 by Dr. Gustavo A. Mellander. Chickering also taught at George Mason University and Goddard College. He worked at Goddard College as a Special Assistant to Presidents Schulman and Vacarr from 2002 to 2012. Chickering died on August 15, 2020, in East Montpelier, VT.

== Awards ==
Chickering has received numerous awards for his service to the development of the fields of student affairs and college student development theories. These include:

- the E.F. Lindquist Award from the American Educational Research Association for his studies of college impacts on student development
- the Outstanding Service Award from the National Association of Student Personnel Administrators
- the Distinguished Contribution to Knowledge Award from the American College Personnel Association
- the Distinguished Service Award from the Council for Independent Colleges
- the Howard R. Bowen Distinguished Career Award for the Association for the Study of Higher Education, for extraordinary contributions to research, leadership and service.

== Education and identity ==
While employed at Goddard College Chickering began the research that led to his most notable publication, Education and Identity. Between 1959 and 1969 he did testing on college students between their sophomore and senior years. Compiling this with data from several other dissimilar colleges he gathered through being the director of the Project on Student Development in Small Colleges, he created his theories of what influences and affects college students in their development. He published in 1969 which explained his seven-vector theory of student development. With the help of Linda Reisser, he updated and republished his theories in 1993.

== List of works ==
Arthur Chickering is the author of many publications relating to student affairs and college student development theories. These include:

- Education and Identity (1969, 1993)
- Commuting Versus Resident Students: Overcoming Educational Inequities of Living Off Campus (1974)
- The Modern American College: Responding to the New Realities of Diverse Students and a Changing Society (1981)
- Improving Higher Education Environments for Adults: Responsive Programs and Services from Entry to Departure (1989, with N.K. Schlossberg and A.Q. Lynch)
- Getting the Most Out of College, (1995, 2001, with Nancy Schlossberg)
- Cool Passion: Challenging Higher Education (2014, with Associates) published by the NASPA Foundation. http://www.naspa.org/publications/books/cool-passion-challenging-higher-education
