= William G. Perry (psychologist) =

William G. Perry Jr. (1913 – January 12, 1998) was an educational psychologist who studied the cognitive development of students during their college years.

== Life and career ==
William Graves Perry Jr. was born in Paris and graduated from Harvard University. He was the son of architect William G. Perry and Eleanor Gray (Bodine) Perry.

He was a professor of education at the Harvard Graduate School of Education and founder and longtime director of the Bureau of Study Counsel. While at Harvard, he developed his theory of the intellectual and cognitive development of college-age students through a 15-year study during the 1950s and 1960s. He published his work in 1970 as Forms of Intellectual and Ethical Development in the College Years. His work was very influential in the field of student development. Perry also translated, with Alsten Hurd Chase, Homer's Iliad.

== Perry's scheme ==
The Perry scheme is a model for understanding how college students come to understand knowledge, the ideas they hold about "knowing", and the ways in which knowing is a part of the cognitive processes of thinking and reasoning. Perry (1970) proposed that college students pass through a predictable sequence of positions of epistemological growth. Fundamental to the Perry scheme is a student's nine-position progression from dualist to relativist epistemologies. Learners move from viewing truth in absolute terms of Right and Wrong (obtained from “Good” or “Bad” Authorities) to recognizing multiple, conflicting versions of “truth” representing legitimate alternatives. Significantly, the intent of the original research was “a purely descriptive formulation of students’ experience,” rather than a “prescriptive program intended to ‘get’ students to develop” (Perry, 1981, p. 107). The Perry scheme of epistemic development becomes prescriptive when teaching and curriculum are “optimally designed to invite, encourage, challenge, and support students in such development” (Perry, 1981, p. 107). The nine positions of the Perry scheme can be grouped into three broader categories, which Perry (1981) identified as: 1) dualism modified (or dualism + multiplicity), 2) relativism discovered, and 3) commitments in relativism developed. The Perry scheme addresses issues distinct from those commonly discussed under the rubric of “critical thinking.” Critical thinking can be understood as the ability to weigh evidence, examine arguments, and construct rational bases for beliefs, but it also includes self-examination of reasoning processes (i.e., metacognition) to evaluate their appropriateness and effectiveness. However, Perry's scheme speaks to epistemic issues underlying critical thinking: students’ assumptions concerning the nature and acquisition of knowledge (or truth).

Since his work, further research on epistemological beliefs and reasoning has refined, extended and adapted Perry's developmental sequence. Perry's Epistemology has also been extended by Baxter Magolda and co-workers who were looking at students' intellectual development and in particular the exposure to the research environment. Knefelkamp and Slepitza (1978) saw the Perry Scheme as a general process model providing a descriptive framework for viewing the development of an individual's reasoning about many aspects of the world. They applied the scheme (with apparent success) to the development of an individual's thinking about career planning. The assumption “that personal epistemology is unidimensional and develops in a fixed progression of stages” has been challenged (Schommer, 1990, p. 498). Nevertheless, Perry's seminal work continues to function as the primary reference point for the discussion on epistemological growth in the adult learner.

In addition, "Bill" Perry was a beloved counselor to undergraduates at Harvard. He was able to deeply empathize in a way that touched the hearts and lives of many students, including some of the minority students who came from first-generation college families in the 1970s.

== Summary of Perry's research ==
Perry's scheme outlines a student's nine-position progression from dualist thinking to relativist thinking and then to commitment.

Summary of Position	Basic Example
The authorities know	e.g. "the tutor knows what is right and wrong"
The true authorities are right, the others are frauds	e.g. "my tutor doesn't know what is right and wrong but others do"
There are some uncertainties and the authorities are working on them to find the truth	e.g. "my tutors don't know, but somebody out there is trying to find out"
(a) Everyone has right to their own opinion (b) The authorities don't want the right answers. They want us to think in a certain way	e.g. "different tutors think different things" e.g. "there is an answer that the tutors want and we have to find it"
Everything is relative but not equally valid	e.g. "there are no right and wrong answers, it depends on the situation, but some answers might be better than others"
You have to make your own decisions	e.g. "what is important is not what the tutor thinks but what I think"
First commitment	e.g. "for this particular topic I think that...."
Several Commitments	e.g. "for these topics I think that...."
Believe own values, respect others, be ready to learn	e.g. "I know what I believe in and what I think is valid, others may think differently and I'm prepared to reconsider my views"

== Bibliography ==
- Perry, William G. (1948). Of counselors and college. Harvard Educational Review. 18, pp. 8–34
- Perry, William G., Estes, Stanley G., & Mowrer, O. Hobart. (1953). "The collaboration of client and counselor", in Mowrer, O. Hobart Psychotherapy: theory and research, (pp. 95–119). Oxford: Ronald Press Co.
- Perry, William G. & Whitlock, Charles P. (1954). A clinical rationale for a reading film. Harvard Educational Review. 24, pp. 6–27.
- Perry, William G. (1955). The findings of the Commission in Counseling and Guidance. Annals of the New York Academy of Sciences. 63, 396-407
- Perry, William G. (1959). Students' uses and misuses of reading skills: A report to the faculty. Harvard Educational Review. 29, 193-200
- Perry, William G., Jr. et al.(1968). Patterns of Development in Thought and Values of Students in a Liberal Arts College: A Validation of a Scheme. Final Report.
- Perry, William G., Jr. (1970). Forms of Intellectual and Ethical Development in the College Years: A Scheme. (New York: Holt, Rinehart, and Winston.)
- Perry, William G., Jr. (1976). Give Shorthand Homework a Skillbuilding Facelift! Journal of Business Education, 52, 2, 85-87
- Perry, William G., Jr. (1981). "Cognitive and Ethical Growth: The Making of Meaning", in Arthur W. Chickering and Associates, The Modern American College (San Francisco: Jossey-Bass): 76-116.

== Sources ==
- Basseches, M. (1978). Beyond closed-system problem-solving: A study of metasystematic aspects of mature thought. Doctoral dissertation, Harvard University.
- Bendixen, L. D. (1998). A phenomenological study of epistemic doubt. Doctoral dissertation, University of Nebraska.
- Broughton, J. (1975). The development of natural epistemology in adolescence and adulthood. Doctoral dissertation, Harvard University.
- Hofer, B. K. and Pintrich, P. R. (1997, Spring). The development of epistemological theories: Beliefs about knowledge and knowing and their relation to learning. Review of Educational Research, 67 (1), 88-140.
- King, P. M. and Kitchener, K. S. (1994). Developing reflective judgment: Understanding and promoting intellectual growth and critical thinking in adolescents and adults. San Francisco: Jossey-Bass Publishers.
- Knefelkamp, L. L. and Slepitza, R. (1978). A cognitive-development model of career development: An adaptation of the Perry scheme. In C. A. Parker (Ed.), Encouraging Development in college students. Minneapolis, University of Minnesota Press.
- Kuhn, D. (1991). The skills of argument. New York: Cambridge University Press.
- Labouvie-Vief, G. (1984). Logic and self-regulation from youth to maturity: A model. In M. L. Commons, F. A. Richards, & C. Armon (Eds.), Beyond formal operations: Late adolescent and adult cognitive development (pp. 158–179). New York: Praeger.
- Moore, W. S. (1989). The learning environment preferences: Exploring the construct validity of an objective measure of the Perry scheme of intellectual development. Journal of College Student Development, 30, 504-514.
- Moore, W. S. (1994). The Perry schema. In K. W. Prichard & R. M. Sawyer (Eds.), Handbook of college teaching. Westport, Connecticut: Greenwood Press.
- Perry, W. G. (1981). Cognitive and ethical growth: The making of meaning. In A. W. Chickering & Assoc. (Eds.), The modern American college (pp. 76–116). San Francisco: Jossey-Bass.
- Ryan, M. P. (1984). Monitoring text comprehension: Individual differences in epistemological standards. Journal of Educational Psychology, 76, 248-258.
- Schommer, M. (1990). Effects of beliefs about the nature of knowledge on comprehension. Journal of Educational Psychology, 82(3), 498-504.
