= Getting It Wrong from the Beginning =

2002 book by Kieran Egan

Getting it Wrong from the Beginning
- Hardcover edition
- Author: Kieran Egan
- Language: English
- Subject: Philosophy
- Genre: Non-fiction
- Publisher: Yale University Press
- Publication date: 2002
- Publication place: United States
- Media type: Print, e-book
- ISBN: 0-300-09433-7

Getting it Wrong from the Beginning: Our Progressivist Inheritance from Herbert Spencer, John Dewey, and Jean Piaget is a 2002 book by Kieran Egan that criticizes the traditional progressivist foundations of modern education in the Western world, especially in North America. Egan primarily focuses on the ideas of Herbert Spencer, John Dewey, and Jean Piaget, which he calls the most influential sources of contemporary progressivist educational philosophy. Egan identifies this book in its introduction as being a companion to his previous work The Educated Mind.

== Main arguments ==
Kieran Egan states in his introduction: "I want to make the case here that most of the beliefs most of the people hold about education today are wrong in fairly fundamental ways." According to Egan, Herbert Spencer was one of the key figures in proliferating the progressive foundations of education. These ideas were further championed by John Dewey and supported with research and writing by Jean Piaget. Egan asserts that these foundations are fundamentally flawed.

The core tenets of progressivism that Egan posits and then questions are: the idea that things (especially learning) always go from simple to complex, the notion that the matters of the mind can be treated like those of the biological body, and that all child-learning should occur as a child learns during play. He also questions the call for utilitarianism in education and the value of educational research. In this book, Egan provides examples and arguments which counter these ideas.

== Criticism ==
The book has been criticized for not providing adequate solutions to the problems it identifies in education. Egan's proposed solutions are developed further in his other publications, notably The Educated Mind: How Cognitive Tools Shape Our Understanding.

In separate articles, Susan Jean Mayer and Robin Zebrowski refute Egan's association of Spencer with Dewey and Piaget while pointing out the profound differences between Spencer and the latter two thinkers. Mayer says that "Egan raises a useful historical question regarding lingering influences of Herbert Spencer's largely discredited scholarship within the world of educational theory", but she argues that Egan's mistaken association of Spencer with Dewey and Piaget is part of Egan's "inadequate characterization of what progressivism has meant in the context of North American education". John Lewis considers Egan's claim of an almost universal influence of Spencer among educators, including Dewey, to be a "straw man" and "somewhat specious".

== Selected reviews ==
- Aeschliman, Michael D. (5 May 2003). "Cults of ignorance". National Review. Vol. 55, no. 8. pp. 48–50.
- Cheney, Lynne V. (Fall 2003). "Progressively worse". Education Next. Vol. 3, no. 4. pp. 83–84.
- Conroy, James C. (November 2005). "Book review: Getting it wrong from the beginning: our progressive inheritance from Herbert Spencer, John Dewey, and Jean Piaget". Theory and Research in Education. 3 (3): 371–374. doi:10.1177/1477878505057439. S2CID 144022182.
- Geary, David C. (February 2006). "Book review: Getting it wrong from the beginning: our progressive inheritance from Herbert Spencer, John Dewey, and Jean Piaget". American Journal of Education. 112 (2): 311–314. doi:10.1086/499000. JSTOR 10.1086/499000.
- Hyslop-Margison, Emery J. (2001). "Book review: Getting it wrong from the beginning: our progressivist inheritance from Herbert Spencer, John Dewey, and Jean Piaget". Canadian Journal of Education. 26 (3): 515–517. doi:10.2307/1602181. JSTOR 1602181.
- Lee, Megan (2002). "Book review: Getting it wrong from the beginning: our progressivist inheritance from Herbert Spencer, John Dewey, and Jean Piaget". Canadian Journal of Education. 27 (2/3): 327–330. doi:10.2307/1602232. JSTOR 1602232.
- Lewis, John (Winter 2003). "Book review: Getting it wrong from the beginning: our progressivist inheritance from Herbert Spencer, John Dewey, and Jean Piaget". University of Toronto Quarterly. 73 (1): 224–225.
- Limond, David (February 2005). "Book review: Getting it wrong from the beginning: our progressive inheritance from Herbert Spencer, John Dewey, and Jean Piaget". Educational Review. 57 (1): 113–114. doi:10.1080/0013191042000274213. S2CID 218511287.
- Mayer, Susan Jean (February 2006). "Getting it right: keeping it complicated". Journal of the American Association for the Advancement of Curriculum Studies. 2. doi:10.14288/jaaacs.v2i0.187642. Archived from the original on 8 January 2007.
- Simpson, Steven (November 2009). "Riding the Dewey merry-go-round: a comparative review of four books". Journal of Experiential Education. 32 (2): 177–181. doi:10.1177/105382590903200206. S2CID 143512309.
- Turner, David (November 2006). "Book review: Getting it wrong from the beginning: our progressive inheritance from Herbert Spencer, John Dewey, and Jean Piaget". Educational Review. 58 (4): 489–516. doi:10.1080/00131910600971966. S2CID 218508562.
- Weible, Davide (2015). "Getting it right from the beginning: imagination and education in John Dewey and Kieran Egan". Education and Culture. 31 (2): 81–112. doi:10.5703/educationculture.31.2.81.
