= Bärbel Inhelder =

Swiss psychologist (1913–1997)

- Born: Bärbel Elisabeth Inhelder; 15 April 1913; St. Gallen, Switzerland
- Died: 17 February 1997 (aged 83)
- Education: University of Geneva
- Scientific career
- Fields: Psychology
- Academic advisors: Jean Piaget

Bärbel Elisabeth Inhelder (15 April 1913 – 17 February 1997) was a Swiss psychologist most known for her work under psychologist and epistemologist Jean Piaget and their contributions toward child development.

Born in St. Gallen, Switzerland, Inhelder initially showed interest in education. While attending high school she became interested in Sigmund Freud's writing and information on adolescents. She then moved to Geneva where she studied at the University of Geneva Institut Jean-Jacques Rousseau earning her bachelor's and doctoral degrees both in psychology. Inhelder continued her work at the University of Geneva up until her retirement. During her time at Geneva, she worked alongside Jean Piaget collaborating on experimental work targeted toward child development. Their collaboration began with her dissertation on children's conservation and continued for 50 years. Inhelder's work was significant in the discovery of the formal operational stage of child development occurring during the transition between childhood and adolescence. Inhelder and Piaget were joint on many publications of their research. Inhelder's contributions to developmental psychology resulted in her being elected as a Foreign Honorary Member of the American Academy of Arts and Sciences. Bärbel Inhelder died in 1997 of natural causes and her work is still used in developmental psychology today.

== Early years and education ==
Bärbel Inhelder grew up as an only child in Switzerland. Her Swedish-born father was a zoologist and her German-born mother was a writer. At a young age Inhelder was moved around in different private and public schools; her father spent time teaching her history, philosophy, nature, and geography. While attending primary school, Inhelder was exposed to the possibility of becoming a teacher. During middle and high school, Inhelder attended classes devoted to Latin, science, mathematics, and art. When Inhelder was accepted into the University of Geneva, she began studying the history of science, neurology, evolutionary theory, as well as Gestalt psychology. Inhelder also began studying under Jean Piaget and by 1943 while at the University of Geneva where she was later awarded her doctorate degree.

== Contributions ==
While working with Piaget, Inhelder carried out an experiment on children’s perceptions of quantity conservation which led to her first publication. This started her career as a female psychologist under Piaget where she was able to publish her work done thus far. During Inhelder's work with Piaget, collaboratively they published many joint publications including: The Growth of Logical Thinking from Childhood to Adolescence (1958), The Psychology of the Child (1966), and the Child's Conception of Space (1967). Their work together influenced Inhelder's discovery of the "formal operations" stage of development occurring during the transition between childhood and adolescence. Her discovery of this stage as well as her deductive reasoning and ability to think hypothetically resulted her in being elected for a Foreign Honorary Member of the American Academy of Arts and Sciences in 1976. Much of her work was foreshadowed due to her work with Piaget. As her career advanced during a visiting appointment at Harvard University in (1961-1962), Inhelder was able to break away from the logical-structural approach of Piaget and focus on applying the functional approach to genetic epistemology.

== Later life and death ==
As a well-known scientist working under Piaget, Inhelder kept her personal life out of the public eye. According to recent biography about Inhelder's life, there is no information stating she was ever married or had children. Inhelder died in 1997 at the age of 83 due to natural causes. In her legacy, she left behind fourteen published books, multiple articles and book chapters, as well as numerous generations of students that she influenced through teaching during her lifespan.
