= An Imaginative Approach to Teaching =

Book by Kieran Egan

- Author: Kieran Egan
- Publication date: 2005
- ISBN: 0-7879-7157-X

An Imaginative Approach to Teaching is a 2005 non-fiction book by Kieran Egan that explains his ideas about how students’ imaginations work in learning. It focuses on the applications of this philosophy in the everyday classroom setting utilizing a set of prescribed cognitive tools. This book is an elaboration of some of Egan’s ideas about how the acquisition of cognitive tools can work effectively in education. He expounded these ideas in his 1997 book The Educated Mind.

== Summary ==
This book contains three main chapters. Each of these chapters focuses on a particular stage of cognitive development and the set of cognitive tools that people use at these stages. The stages are linked to the development of oral language, literacy and theoretical thinking.

The first chapter describes the cognitive tools linked with oral language use. These include story form, metaphor, binary opposites, rhyme, rhythm and pattern, humor, and mental imagery among others. These tools first become present in preliterate people, which generally happen to be children before the age of seven.

The second chapter describes the cognitive tools that are added with the onset of literacy. These include a sense of reality, interest in extremes of experience, association with heroes, connecting knowledge with human meaning, narrative understanding among others. Egan states that these tools do not replace the previous toolkit, but are additions.

The third chapter describes the cognitive tools that are added when students are nurtured toward theoretical thinking. The two previous toolkits are prerequisites to developing this toolkit. Some of the tools indicated here are a sense of abstract reality, a sense of agency, a grasp of general ideas and their anomalies, a search for authority and truth, and meta-narrative understanding.

After each of these three chapters, a section referred to as a “half chapter” is included. These half chapters include suggested planning frameworks for the preceding cognitive toolkit and a series of example lessons or units.

== Reception ==
An Imaginative Approach to Teaching received positive reviews in the Teachers College Record and the Eurasia Journal of Mathematics, Science & Technology Education. The Teachers College Record stated that “[t]his book is filled with creative and practical advice that encourages teachers to use stories engage students' imaginations.” The Eurasia Journal of Mathematics, Science & Technology Education stated that “An Imaginative Approach to Teaching can be useful for teachers, teacher educators, staff development professionals in a great exten[t].”

== Reviews ==
- Roedenbeck, M. (2006). AN IMAGINATIVE APPROACH TO TEACHING. Childhood Education, 82(3), 182-183.
- Sawyer, K. R. (2006). An imaginative approach to teaching. Teachers College Record, 108(1), 179-82.
- TAŞAR, M. F. (2007). An imaginative approach to teaching. Eurasia Journal of Mathematics, Science & Technology Education, 3(3), 247-48

== See also ==
- Imaginative Education Research Group (IERG) home page
- An Imaginative Approach to Teaching on Kieran Egan’s personal page
