= Pierre Oléron =

French psychologist (1915–1995)

- Born: 4 October 1915; Belfort, France
- Died: 22 April 1995 (aged 79); Meudon, France
- Citizenship: French
- Education: University of Paris
- Known for: Research on intelligence, language development and deafness
- Awards: CNRS bronze medal (1957)
- Scientific career
- Fields: Psychology, Developmental psychology
- Workplaces: University of Paris; Paris Descartes University

Pierre Oléron (4 October 1915 – 22 April 1995) was a French psychologist known for his research on intelligence, the role of language in cognitive development, and the psychology of deaf children. He was a professor at the Faculty of Letters and Human Sciences of the University of Paris (Sorbonne) and later at Paris Descartes University (Paris V), and served as president of the Société française de psychologie in 1963–1964.

== Early life and education ==
Oléron was born in Belfort, the son of an army officer. Poor health during his childhood meant he was largely schooled at home with his father's help. He obtained his baccalauréat at 17 and went on to study philosophy at the Sorbonne, where his teachers included Émile Bréhier and Léon Brunschvicg. He passed the agrégation in philosophy in 1939 and first taught at secondary level.

== Career and research ==
Oléron later moved into academic psychology, teaching child psychology and then becoming a professor at the Sorbonne and at Paris V. Coslin describes him as one of the figures who established psychology as a science in France, bridging genetic psychology and modern developmental psychology over half a century of research on children.

His work covered the factorial study of intelligence, reasoning and argumentation, and the cognitive development of deaf children, including the syntax of sign language. His 1957 monograph on the components of intelligence earned him the CNRS bronze medal. He edited the volume on intelligence in the Traité de psychologie expérimentale directed by Paul Fraisse and Jean Piaget, which appeared in English in 1969.

His book Language and Mental Development, published in English in 1977, examined Soviet and behaviourist theories of verbal mediation, compared them with Piaget's views, and discussed the differences between oral and signed languages. It was reissued by Routledge in 2021.

== Selected works ==
=== In French ===
- Les sourds-muets [Deaf-mutes]. Que sais-je ? (in French). Paris: PUF. 1950.
- Les composantes de l'intelligence d'après les recherches factorielles [The components of intelligence according to factorial research] (in French). Paris: PUF. 1957.
- L'éducation des enfants physiquement handicapés [The education of physically disabled children] (in French). Paris: PUF. 1961.
- Les activités intellectuelles [Intellectual activities] (in French). Paris: PUF. 1964.
- L'intelligence [Intelligence]. Que sais-je ? (in French). Paris: PUF. 1974.
- Le raisonnement [Reasoning]. Que sais-je ? (in French). Paris: PUF. 1977.
- Langage et développement mental [Language and mental development] (in French). Brussels: Mardaga. 1978.
- Le langage gestuel des sourds : syntaxe et communication [The sign language of the deaf: syntax and communication]. Monographies françaises de psychologie (in French). Paris: Éditions du CNRS. 1978. ISBN 2-222-02274-6.
- L'argumentation [Argumentation]. Que sais-je ? (in French). Paris: PUF. 1983.
- L'intelligence de l'homme [Human intelligence] (in French). Paris: Armand Colin. 1989.

=== In English translation ===
- Oléron, Pierre; et al. (1969). Intelligence. Experimental Psychology: Its Scope and Method. Vol. 7. Translated by Thérèse Surridge. London: Routledge & Kegan Paul.
- Oléron, Pierre (1977). Language and Mental Development. Translated by Raymond P. Lorion. Hillsdale, NJ: Lawrence Erlbaum Associates. ISBN 0-470-99027-9. Reissued by Routledge, Psychology Revivals, 2021, ISBN 978-1-03-201350-3.
