= Religious development =

"Religious development" refers to the formation of religious beliefs and values in individuals. Processes of religious development may be studied within the scope of social sciences such as psychology, anthropology, ethnography, and sociology, among others.

== Phases of religious development ==
=== Childhood ===
According to the psychologist Jean Piaget, children and adolescents go through three stages of religious development. From one study, in which children were asked about what they thought of religious pictures and Bible stories, Piaget's theories were supported by the children's responses.

==== Pre-operational intuitive religious thought ====
Intuitive religious thought processes can occur in children up to seven or eight years of age. This type of thought is marked by unsystematic and fragmented thoughts. Children do not understand or comprehend the stories and the evidence of religions.

==== Concrete operational thought ====
Concrete operational thought occurs between the ages of seven or eight until 13 or 14 years of age. At this point, Piaget states that children start to focus on particular details of pictures and stories.

==== Formal operational thought ====
From the age of 14 and through the rest of adolescence, abstract religious thoughts start to occur.

=== Early Adulthood ===
At this age, people go through identity development which may lead them to start thinking deeper about religious beliefs.

The importance of religion in the lives of people in early adulthood has been declining in the 21st century. Religious importance in early adulthood is higher in less developed countries compared to developed countries. Recent findings illustrate that a revival of Christianity in Western countries, particularly among young people is currently occurring.

=== Adulthood ===
According to some studies, religion increases in importance later in adulthood. A survey in the United States showed that 72 percent of surveyed said they are religious and consider spirituality a major part of their lives. However, studies also indicate that individuals in the US are becoming less involved in organized religion and instead shifting towards individualized spirituality.

== Factors affecting religious development ==
=== Parenting ===
Some research indicates that parents can have a strong effect on religious development in children and adolescents, as they tend to adopt the religion that is practiced during their upbringing. The relationship between parents and their children however can change this. If there is a positive relationship between the parents and child, the child will be more likely to adopt their religious beliefs. In the case where there is a negative relationship between the parents and child, the child will be more likely to disaffiliate themselves with their parents' religious ideas.

Race and Gender

Research also suggests that race and gender play a major role in religious development as well. Females tend to believe there is a higher power more than males. They also participate more in organized and personal forms of religion. Females also are more likely to feel like religion is a major factor in their lives. In regards to race, Latinos and African Americans show higher rates of participation in religion than White Americans. Religious importance also varies from country to country. In a study of emerging adults, Japanese said that religion had a 0 percent importance in their lives compared to a high of 93 percent saying it has a very high importance in their lives in Nigeria. 40 percent of emerging adults in Sweden believe in God compared to a high of 100 percent belief in God in Pakistan.
