= Jean Piaget =

Swiss psychologist (1896–1980)

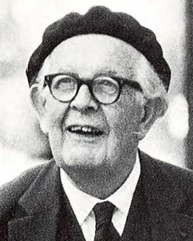
- Piaget at the University of Michigan, c. 1968
- Born: Jean William Fritz Piaget; 9 August 1896; Neuchâtel, Switzerland
- Died: 16 September 1980 (aged 84); Geneva, Switzerland
- Education: University of Neuchâtel; University of Zürich
- Known for: Constructivism, Genevan School, genetic epistemology, theory of cognitive development, object permanence, egocentrism
- Scientific career
- Fields: Developmental psychology, epistemology
- Workplaces: University of Neuchâtel; University of Geneva; University of Lausanne; University of Paris
- Academic advisors: Théodore Simon
- Doctoral students: Hans Aebli
- Other notable students: Bärbel Inhelder

Jean William Fritz Piaget (Note: UK: /piˈæʒeɪ/, US: /ˌpiːəˈʒeɪ, pjɑːˈʒeɪ/; French: [ʒɑ̃ pjaʒɛ]) (9 August 1896 – 16 September 1980) was a Swiss psychologist known for his work on child development. Piaget's theory of cognitive development and epistemological view are together called genetic epistemology.

Piaget placed great importance on the education of children. As the Director of the International Bureau of Education, he declared in 1934 that "only education is capable of saving our societies from possible collapse, whether violent, or gradual". His theory of child development has been studied in pre-service education programs. Nowadays, educators and theorists working in the area of early childhood education persist in incorporating constructivist-based strategies.

Piaget created the International Center for Genetic Epistemology in Geneva in 1955 while on the faculty of the University of Geneva, and directed the center until his death in 1980. The number of collaborations that its founding made possible, and their impact, ultimately led to the Center being referred to in the scholarly literature as "Piaget's factory".

According to Ernst von Glasersfeld, Piaget was "the great pioneer of the constructivist theory of knowing". His ideas were widely popularized in the 1960s. This then led to the emergence of the study of development as a major sub-discipline in psychology. By the end of the 20th century, he was second only to B. F. Skinner as the most-cited psychologist.

== Biography ==
=== Early life and education ===
Piaget was born in 1896 in Neuchâtel, in the Francophone region of Switzerland. He was the oldest son of Arthur Piaget (Swiss), a professor of medieval literature at the University of Neuchâtel, and Rebecca Jackson (French). Rebecca Jackson came from a prominent family of French steel foundry owners. Piaget was a precocious child who developed an interest in biology and the natural world. His early interest in zoology earned him a reputation among those in the field after he had published several articles on mollusks by the age of 15.

When he was 15, his former nanny wrote to his parents to apologize for having once lied to them about fighting off a would-be kidnapper from baby Jean's pram. There never was a kidnapper. Piaget became fascinated that he had somehow formed a memory of this kidnapping incident, a memory that endured even after he understood it to be false.

He developed an interest in epistemology due to his godfather's urgings to study the fields of philosophy and logic. He was educated at the University of Neuchâtel, and studied briefly at the University of Zürich. During this time, he published two philosophical papers that showed the direction of his thinking at the time, but which he later dismissed as adolescent thought. His interest in psychoanalysis, at the time a burgeoning strain of psychology, can also be dated to this period.

=== Career ===
Piaget moved from Switzerland to Paris after his graduation and he taught at the Grange-Aux-Belles Street School for Boys. The school was run by Alfred Binet, the developer of the Binet-Simon test (later revised by Lewis Terman to become the Stanford–Binet Intelligence Scales). Piaget assisted in the marking of Binet's intelligence tests. It was while he was helping to mark some of these tests that Piaget noticed that young children consistently gave wrong answers to certain questions. Piaget did not focus so much on the fact of the children's answers being wrong, but that young children consistently made types of mistakes that older children and adults managed to avoid. This led him to the theory that young children's cognitive processes are inherently different from those of adults. Ultimately, he was to propose a global theory of cognitive developmental stages in which individuals exhibit certain common patterns of cognition in each period of development.

In 1921, Piaget returned to Switzerland as director of the Rousseau Institute in Geneva. At this time, the institute was directed by Édouard Claparède. Piaget was familiar with many of Claparède's ideas, including that of the psychological concept of groping which was closely associated with "trials and errors" observed in human mental patterns.

In 1923, he married Valentine Châtenay (7 January 1899 – 3 July 1983); the couple had three children, whom Piaget studied from infancy. From 1925 to 1929, Piaget worked as a professor of psychology, sociology, and the philosophy of science at the University of Neuchatel. In 1929, Piaget accepted the post of Director of the International Bureau of Education and remained the head of this international organization until 1968. Every year, he drafted his "Director's Speeches" for the IBE Council and for the International Conference on Public Education in which he explicitly addressed his educational credo.

Having taught at the University of Geneva, and at the University of Paris in 1964, Piaget was invited to serve as chief consultant at two conferences at Cornell University (11–13 March) and the University of California, Berkeley (16–18 March). The conferences addressed the relationship of cognitive studies and curriculum development, and strived to conceive implications of recent investigations of children's cognitive development for curricula.

=== Death ===
Piaget died on 16 September 1980, and, as he had requested, was buried with his family in an unmarked grave in the Cimetière des Rois (Cemetery of Kings) in Plainpalais district of Geneva.

== Psychology ==
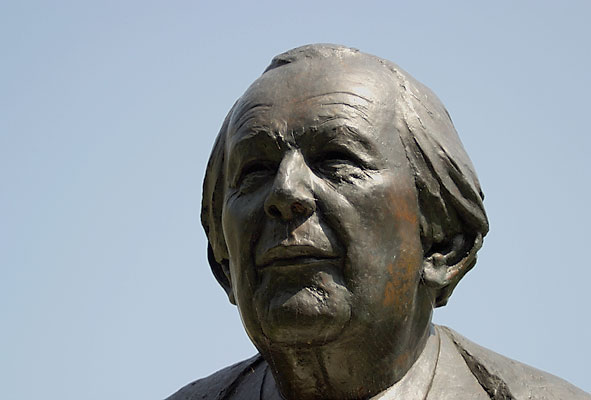
Bust of Piaget in the Parc des Bastions, Geneva

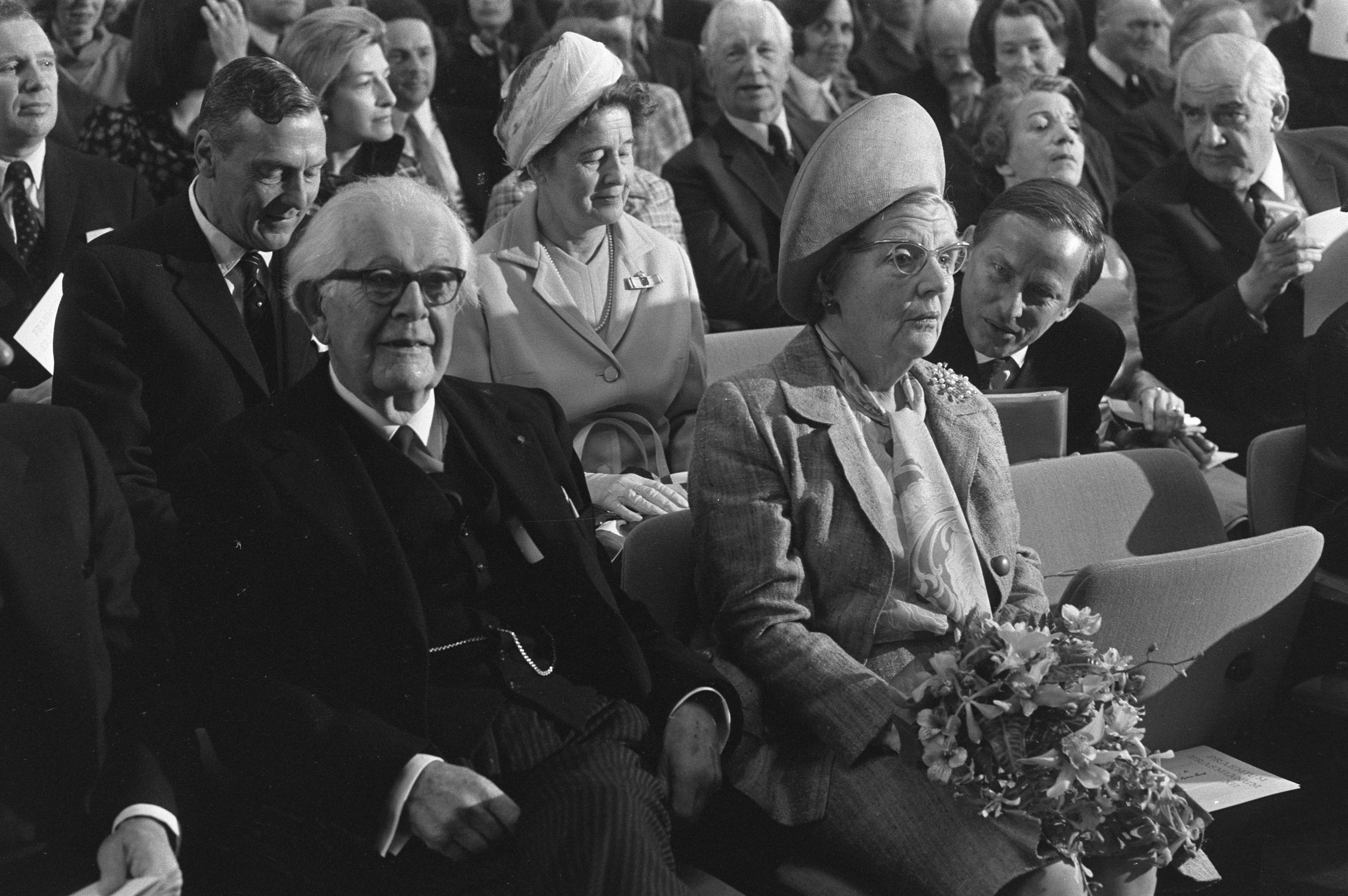
Piaget at Award ceremony of the Erasmus Prize, 1972, Amsterdam

Harry Beilin described Piaget's theoretical research program as consisting of four phases:

1. the sociological model of development,
2. the biological model of intellectual development,
3. the elaboration of the logical model of intellectual development,
4. the study of figurative thought.

The resulting theoretical frameworks are sufficiently different from each other that they have been characterized as representing different "Piagets". More recently, Jeremy Burman responded to Beilin and called for the addition of a phase before his turn to psychology: "the zeroth Piaget".

=== Sociological model of development ===
Piaget first developed as a psychologist in the 1920s. He investigated the hidden side of children's minds. Piaget proposed that children moved from a position of egocentrism to sociocentrism. For this explanation he combined the use of psychological and clinical methods to create what he called a semiclinical interview. He began the interview by asking children standardized questions and depending on how they answered, he would ask them a series of standard questions. Piaget was looking for what he called "spontaneous conviction" so he often asked questions the children neither expected nor anticipated. In his studies, he noticed there was a gradual progression from intuitive to scientific and socially acceptable responses. Piaget theorized children did this because of the social interaction and the challenge to younger children's ideas by the ideas of those children who were more advanced.

This work was used by Elton Mayo as the basis for the famous Hawthorne Experiments. For Piaget, it also led to an honorary doctorate from Harvard in 1936.

=== Biological model of intellectual development ===
In this stage, Piaget believed that the process of thinking and intellectual development could be regarded as an extension of the biological process of the (adaptation) of the species, which has also two ongoing processes: assimilation and accommodation. There is assimilation when a child responds to a new event in a way that is consistent with an existing schema. There is accommodation when a child either modifies an existing schema or forms an entirely new schema to deal with a new object or event.

He argued infants were engaging in the act of assimilation when they sucked on everything in their reach. He claimed infants transform all objects into an object to be sucked. The children were assimilating the objects to conform to their own mental structures. Piaget then made the assumption that whenever one transforms the world to meet individual needs or conceptions, one is, in a way, assimilating it. Piaget also observed his children not only assimilating objects to fit their needs, but also modifying some of their mental structures to meet the demands of the environment. This is the second division of adaptation known as accommodation. To start, the infants only engaged in primarily reflex actions such as sucking, but not long after, they would pick up objects and put them in their mouths. When they do this, they modify their reflex response to accommodate the external objects into reflex actions. Because the two are often in conflict, they provide the impetus for intellectual development—the constant need to balance the two triggers intellectual growth.

To test his theory, Piaget observed the habits in his own children.

=== Elaboration of the logical model of intellectual development ===
In the model Piaget developed in stage three, he argued that intelligence develops in a series of stages that are related to age and are progressive because one stage must be accomplished before the next can occur. For each stage of development the child forms a view of reality for that age period. At the next stage, the child must keep up with earlier level of mental abilities to reconstruct concepts. Piaget conceived intellectual development as an upward expanding spiral in which children must constantly reconstruct the ideas formed at earlier levels with new, higher order concepts acquired at the next level.

It is primarily the "Third Piaget" (the logical model of intellectual development) that was debated by American psychologists when Piaget's ideas were "rediscovered" in the 1960s.

=== Study of figurative thought ===
Piaget studied areas of intelligence like perception and memory that are not entirely logical. Logical concepts are described as being completely reversible because they can always get back to the starting point, meaning that if one starts with a given premise and follows logical steps to reach a conclusion, the same steps may be done in the opposite order, starting from the conclusion to arrive at the premise. The perceptual concepts Piaget studied could not be manipulated. To describe the figurative process, Piaget uses pictures as examples. Pictures cannot be separated because contours cannot be separated from the forms they outline. Memory is the same way: it is never completely reversible; people cannot necessarily recall all the intervening events between two points. During this last period of work, Piaget and his colleague Bärbel Inhelder also published books on perception, memory, and other figurative processes such as learning.

Because Piaget's theory is based upon biological maturation and stages, the notion of readiness is important. Readiness concerns when certain information or concepts should be taught. According to Piaget's theory, children should not be taught certain concepts until they reached the appropriate stage of cognitive development. For example, young children in the preoperational stage engage in "irreversible" thought and cannot comprehend that an item that has been transformed in some way may be returned to its original state.

=== Theory ===
Piaget defined himself as a 'genetic' epistemologist, interested in the process of the qualitative development of knowledge. He considered cognitive structures' development as a differentiation of biological regulations. When his entire theory first became known – the theory in itself being based on a structuralist and a cognitivitist approach – it was an outstanding and exciting development in regards to the psychological community at that time.

There are a total of four phases in Piaget's research program that included books on certain topics of developmental psychology. In particular, during one period of research, he described himself studying his own three children, and carefully observing and interpreting their cognitive development. In one of his last books, Equilibration of Cognitive Structures: The Central Problem of Intellectual Development, he intends to explain knowledge development as a process of equilibration using two main concepts in his theory, assimilation and accommodation, as belonging not only to biological interactions but also to cognitive ones.

He stated that children are born with limited capabilities and their cognition ability develops with age.

Piaget believed answers for the epistemological questions at his time could be answered, or better proposed, if one looked to the genetic aspect of it, hence his experimentations with children and adolescents. As he says in the introduction of his book Genetic Epistemology: "What the genetic epistemology proposes is discovering the roots of the different varieties of knowledge, since its elementary forms, following to the next levels, including also the scientific knowledge."

==== Stages ====
The four development stages are described in Piaget's theory as:

1. Sensorimotor stage: from birth to age two. The children experience the world through movement and their senses. During the sensorimotor stage children are extremely egocentric, meaning they cannot perceive the world from others' viewpoints. The sensorimotor stage is divided into six substages:
  1. Simple reflexes: From birth to one month old. At this time infants use reflexes such as rooting and sucking.
  2. First habits and primary circular reactions: From one month to four months old. During this time infants learn to coordinate sensation and two types of schema (habit and circular reactions). A primary circular reaction is when the infant tries to reproduce an event that happened by accident (ex.: sucking thumb).
  3. Secondary circular reactions: From four to eight months old. At this time they become aware of things beyond their own body; they are more object-oriented. At this time they might accidentally shake a rattle and continue to do it for sake of satisfaction.
  4. Coordination of secondary circular reactions: From eight months to twelve months old. During this stage they can do things intentionally. They can now combine and recombine schemata and try to reach a goal (ex.: use a stick to reach something). They also begin to understand object permanence in the later months and early into the next stage. That is, they understand that objects continue to exist even when they can't see them.
  5. Tertiary circular reactions, novelty, and curiosity: From twelve months old to eighteen months old. During this stage infants explore new possibilities of objects; they try different things to get different results.
  6. Internalization of schemata.
  Some followers of Piaget's studies of infancy, such as Kenneth Kaye argue that his contribution was as an observer of countless phenomena not previously described, but that he didn't offer explanation of the processes in real time that cause those developments, beyond analogizing them to broad concepts about biological adaptation generally. Kaye's "apprenticeship theory" of cognitive and social development refuted Piaget's assumption that mind developed endogenously in infants until the capacity for symbolic reasoning allowed them to learn language.
2. Preoperational stage: Piaget's second stage, the preoperational stage, starts when the child begins to learn to speak at age two and lasts up until the age of seven. During the preoperational stage of cognitive development, Piaget noted that children do not yet understand concrete logic and cannot mentally manipulate information. Children's increase in playing and pretending takes place in this stage. The child still has trouble seeing things from different points of view. The children's play is mainly categorized by symbolic play and manipulating symbols. Such play is demonstrated by the idea of checkers being snacks, pieces of paper being plates, and a box being a table. Their observations of symbols exemplifies the idea of play with the absence of the actual objects involved. By observing sequences of play, Piaget was able to demonstrate that, toward the end of the second year, a qualitatively new kind of psychological functioning occurs, known as the preoperational stage.
  The preoperational stage is sparse and logically inadequate in regard to mental operations. The child is able to form stable concepts as well as magical beliefs, but not perform operations, which are mental tasks, rather than physical. Thinking in this stage is still egocentric, meaning the child has difficulty seeing the viewpoint of others. The preoperational stage is split into two substages: the symbolic function substage, and the intuitive thought substage. The symbolic function substage is when children are able to understand, represent, remember, and picture objects in their mind without having the object in front of them. The intuitive thought substage is when children tend to propose the questions of "why?" and "how come?" This stage is when children want the knowledge of knowing everything.
  The Preoperational Stage is divided into two substages:
  1. Symbolic Function Substage. From two to four years of age children find themselves using symbols to represent physical models of the world around them. This is demonstrated through a child's drawing of their family in which people are not drawn to scale or accurate physical traits are given. The child knows they are not accurate but it does not seem to be an issue to them.
  2. Intuitive Thought Substage. At between about the ages of four and seven, children tend to become very curious and ask many questions, beginning the use of primitive reasoning. There is an emergence in the interest of reasoning and wanting to know why things are the way they are. Piaget called it the "intuitive substage" because children realize they have a vast amount of knowledge, but they are unaware of how they acquired it. Centration, conservation, irreversibility, class inclusion, and transitive inference are all characteristics of preoperative thought.
3. Concrete operational stage: from ages seven to eleven. Children can now converse and think logically (they understand reversibility) but are limited to what they can physically manipulate. They are no longer egocentric. During this stage, children become more aware of logic and conservation, topics previously foreign to them. Children also improve drastically with their classification skills.
4. Formal operational stage: from age eleven and onward (development of abstract reasoning). Children develop abstract thought and can easily conserve and think logically in their mind. Abstract thought is newly present during this stage of development. Children are now able to think abstractly and use metacognition. Along with this, the children in the formal operational stage display more skills oriented toward problem solving, often in multiple steps.

==== Psychology of functions and correspondences ====
Piaget had sometimes been criticized for characterizing preoperational children in terms of the cognitive capacities they lacked, rather than their cognitive accomplishments. A late turn in the development of Piaget's theory saw the emergence of work on the accomplishments of those children within the framework of his psychology of functions and correspondences. This new phase in Piaget's work was less stage-dependent and reflected greater continuity in human development than would be expected in a stage-bound theory. This advance in his work took place toward the end of his very productive life and is sometimes absent from developmental psychology textbooks.

An example of a function can involve sets X and Y and ordered pairs of elements (x,y), in which x is an element of X and y, Y. In a function, an element of X is mapped onto exactly one element of Y (the reverse need not be true). A function therefore involves a unique mapping in one direction, or, as Piaget and his colleagues have written, functions are "univocal to the right" (Piaget et al., 1977, p. 14). When each element of X maps onto exactly one element of Y and each element of Y maps onto exactly one element of X, Piaget and colleagues indicated that the uniqueness condition holds in either direction and called the relationship between the elements of X and Y "biunivocal" or "one-to-one". They advanced the idea that the preoperational child manifests some understanding of one-way order functions.

According to Piaget's Genevan colleagues, the "semilogic" of these order functions sustains the preoperational child's ability to use of spatial extent to index and compare quantities. The child, for example, could use the length of an array to index the number of objects in the array. Thus, the child would judge the longer of two arrays as having the greater number of objects. Although imperfect, such comparisons are often fair ("semilogical") substitutes for exact quantification. Furthermore, these order functions underlie the child's rudimentary knowledge of environmental regularities. Young children are capable of constructing—this reflects the constructivist bent of Piaget's work—sequences of objects of alternating color. They also have an understanding of the pairwise exchanges of cards having pictures of different flowers.

Piaget and colleagues have examined morphisms, which to them differ from the operative transformations observed on concrete operational children. Piaget (1977) wrote that "correspondences and morphisms are essentially comparisons that do not transform objects to be compared but that extract common forms from them or analogies between them" (p. 351). He advanced the idea that this type of knowledge emerges from "primitive applications" of action schemes to objects in the environment. In one study of morphisms, Piaget and colleagues asked children to identify items in a series of movable red cutouts that could cover a pre-specified section of each of four base cards—each card had a red area and a white area. The task, in effect, asked the child to superimpose the cut-outs on a base card to make the entire card appear to be red. Although there were 12 cutouts in all, only three, which differed slightly from each other, could make an entire base card look red. The youngest children studied—they were age 5—could match, using trial and error, one cut-out to one base card. Piaget et al. called this type of morphism bijection, a term-by-term correspondence. Older children were able to do more by figuring out how to make entire card appear to be red by using three cutouts. In other words, they could perform three to one matching. Piaget et al. (1977) called a many-to-one match surjection.

==== Developmental process ====
Piaget provided no concise description of the development process as a whole. Broadly speaking it consisted of a cycle:

- The child performs an action which has an effect on or organizes objects, and the child is able to note the characteristics of the action and its effects.
- Through repeated actions, perhaps with variations or in different contexts or on different kinds of objects, the child is able to differentiate and integrate its elements and effects. This is the process of "reflecting abstraction" (described in detail in Piaget 2001).
- At the same time, the child is able to identify the properties of objects by the way different kinds of actions affect them. This is the process of "empirical abstraction".
- By repeating this process across a wide range of objects and actions, the child establishes a new level of knowledge and insight. This is the process of forming a new "cognitive stage". This dual process allows the child to construct new ways of dealing with objects and new knowledge about objects themselves.
- Once the child has constructed these new kinds of knowledge, he or she starts to use them to create still more complex objects and to carry out still more complex actions. As a result, the child starts to recognize still more complex patterns and to construct still more complex objects. Thus a new stage begins, which will only be completed when all the child's activity and experience have been re-organized on this still higher level.

This process may not be wholly gradual, but new evidence shows that the passage into new stages is more gradual than once thought. Once a new level of organization, knowledge and insight proves to be effective, it will quickly be generalized to other areas if they exist. As a result, transitions between stages can seem to be rapid and radical, but oftentimes the child has grasped one aspect of the new stage of cognitive functioning but not addressed others. The bulk of the time spent in a new stage consists of refining this new cognitive level; it does not always happen quickly. For example, a child may see that two different colors of Play-Doh have been fused together to make one ball, based on the color. If sugar is mixed into water or iced tea, then the sugar "disappeared" and therefore does not exist to the child at that stage. These levels of one concept of cognitive development are not realized all at once, giving us a gradual realization of the world around us.

It is because this process takes this dialectical form, in which each new stage is created through the further differentiation, integration, and synthesis of new structures out of the old, that the sequence of cognitive stages are logically necessary rather than simply empirically correct. Each new stage emerges only because the child can take for granted the achievements of its predecessors, and yet there are still more sophisticated forms of knowledge and action that are capable of being developed.

Because it covers both how we gain knowledge about objects and our reflections on our own actions, Piaget's model of development explains a number of features of human knowledge that had never previously been accounted for. For example, by showing how children progressively enrich their understanding of things by acting on and reflecting on the effects of their own previous knowledge, they are able to organize their knowledge in increasingly complex structures. Thus, once a young child can consistently and accurately recognize different kinds of animals, he or she then acquires the ability to organize the different kinds into higher groupings such as "birds", "fish", and so on. This is significant because they are now able to know things about a new animal simply on the basis of the fact that it is a bird – for example, that it will lay eggs.

At the same time, by reflecting on their own actions, children develop an increasingly sophisticated awareness of the "rules" that govern them in various ways. For example, it is by this route that Piaget explains this child's growing awareness of notions such as "right", "valid", "necessary", "proper", and so on. In other words, it is through the process of objectification, reflection and abstraction that the child constructs the principles on which action is not only effective or correct but also justified.

One of Piaget's most famous studies focused purely on the discriminative abilities of children between the ages of two and a half years old, and four and a half years old. He began the study by taking children of different ages and placing two lines of sweets, one with the sweets in a line spread further apart, and one with the same number of sweets in a line placed more closely together. He found that, "Children between 2 years, 6 months old and 3 years, 2 months old correctly discriminate the relative number of objects in two rows; between 3 years, 2 months and 4 years, 6 months they indicate a longer row with fewer objects to have "more"; after 4 years, 6 months they again discriminate correctly" (Cognitive Capacity of Very Young Children, p. 141). Initially younger children were not studied, because if at four years old a child could not conserve quantity, then a younger child presumably could not either. The results show that children that are younger than three years and two months have quantity conservation, but as they get older they lose this quality, and do not recover it until four and a half years old. This attribute may be lost due to a temporary inability to solve because of an overdependence on perceptual strategies, which correlates more candy with a longer line of candy, or due to the inability for a four-year-old to reverse situations.

By the end of this experiment several results were found. First, younger children have a discriminative ability that shows the logical capacity for cognitive operations exists earlier than acknowledged. This study also reveals that young children can be equipped with certain qualities for cognitive operations, depending on how logical the structure of the task is. Research also shows that children develop explicit understanding at age 5 and as a result, the child will count the sweets to decide which has more. Finally the study found that overall quantity conservation is not a basic characteristic of humans' native inheritance.

==== Genetic epistemology ====
According to Piaget, genetic epistemology attempts to "explain knowledge, and in particular scientific knowledge, on the basis of its history, its sociogenesis, and especially the psychological origins of the notions and operations upon which it is based". Piaget believed he could test epistemological questions by studying the development of thought and action in children. As a result, Piaget created a field known as genetic epistemology with its own methods and problems. He defined this field as the study of child development as a means of answering epistemological questions.

==== Schema ====
A schema (plural form: schemata) is a structured cluster of concepts, it can be used to represent objects, scenarios or sequences of events or relations. The philosopher Immanuel Kant first proposed the concept of schemata as innate structures used to help us perceive the world.

A schema is a mental framework that is created as children interact with their physical and social environments. For example, many 3-year-olds insist that the sun is alive because it comes up in the morning and goes down at night. According to Piaget, these children are operating based on a simple cognitive schema that things that move are alive. At any age, children rely on their current cognitive structures to understand the world around them. Moreover, younger and older children may often interpret and respond to the same objects and events in very different ways because cognitive structures take different forms at different ages.

Piaget (1953) described three kinds of intellectual structures: behavioural (or sensorimotor) schemata, symbolic schemata, and operational schemata.

- Behavioural schemata: organized patterns of behaviour that are used to represent and respond to objects and experiences.
- Symbolic schemata: internal mental symbols (such as images or verbal codes) that one uses to represent aspects of experience.
- Operational schemata: internal mental activity that one performs on objects of thought.

According to Piaget, children use the process of assimilation and accommodation to create a schema or mental framework for how they perceive and/or interpret what they are experiencing. As a result, the early concepts of young children tend to be more global or general in nature.

Similarly, Gallagher and Reid (1981) maintained that adults view children's concepts as highly generalized and even inaccurate. With added experience, interactions, and maturity, these concepts become refined and more detailed. Overall, making sense of the world from a child's perspective is a very complex and time-consuming process.

A schema is:

- A critically important building block of conceptual development
- Constantly in the process of being modified or changed
- Modified by on-going experiences
- A generalized idea, usually based on experience or prior knowledge.

These schemata are constantly being revised and elaborated upon each time the child encounters new experiences. In doing this children create their own unique understanding of the world, interpret their own experiences and knowledge, and subsequently use this knowledge to solve more complex problems. In a neurological sense, the brain/mind is constantly working to build and rebuild itself as it takes in, adapts/modifies new information, and enhances understanding.

=== Research methods ===
Piaget wanted to revolutionize the way research was conducted. Although he started researching with his colleagues using a traditional method of data collection, he was not fully satisfied with the results and wanted to keep trying to find new ways of researching using a combination of data, which included naturalistic observation, psychometrics, and the psychiatric clinical examination, in order to have a less guided form of research that would produce more empirically valid results. As Piaget developed new research methods, he wrote a book called The Language and Thought of the Child, which aimed to synthesize the methods he was using in order to study the conclusions children drew from situations and how they arrived at such conclusions. The main idea was to observe how children responded and articulated certain situations with their own reasoning, in order to examine their thought processes (Mayer, 2005).

Piaget administered a test in 15 boys with ages ranging from 10 to 14 years in which he asked participants to describe the relationship between a mixed bouquet of flowers and a bouquet with flowers of the same color. The purpose of this study was to analyze the thinking process the boys had and to draw conclusions about the logic processes they had used, which was a psychometric technique of research. Piaget also used the psychoanalytic method initially developed by Sigmund Freud. The purpose of using such method was to examine the unconscious mind, as well as to continue parallel studies using different research methods. Psychoanalysis was later rejected by Piaget, as he thought it was insufficiently empirical (Mayer, 2005).

Piaget argued that children and adults used speech for different purposes. In order to confirm his argument, he experimented analyzing a child's interpretation of a story. In the experiment, the child listened to a story and then told a friend that same story in his/her/their own words. The purpose of this study was to examine how children verbalize and understand each other without adult intervention. Piaget wanted to examine the limits of naturalistic observation, in order to understand a child's reasoning. He realized the difficulty of studying children's thoughts, as it is hard to know if a child is pretending to believe their thoughts or not. Piaget was the pioneer researcher to examine children's conversations in a social context – starting from examining their speech and actions – where children were comfortable and spontaneous (Kose, 1987).

==== Issues and possible solutions ====
After conducting many studies, Piaget found significant differences in the way adults and children reason. He could not find the path of logic reasoning and the unspoken thoughts children had, which would allow him to study a child's intellectual development over time (Mayer, 2005). In his third book, The Child's Conception of the World, Piaget recognized the difficulties of his prior techniques and the importance of psychiatric clinical examination. The researcher believed that the way clinical examinations were conducted influenced how a child's inner realities surfaced. Children would likely respond according to the way the research is conducted, the questions asked, or the familiarity they have with the environment. The clinical examination conducted for his third book provides a thorough investigation into a child's thinking process. An example of a question used to research such process was: "Can you see a thought?" (Mayer, 2005, p. 372).

==== Piaget replaces psychometric tests with the clinical method approach ====
Piaget recognized that psychometric tests had its limitations, as children were not able to provide the researcher with their deepest thoughts and inner intellect. It was also difficult to know if the results of child examination reflected what children believed or if it is just a pretend situation. For example, it is very difficult to know with certainty if a child who has a conversation with a toy believes the toy is alive or if the child is just pretending. Soon after drawing conclusions about psychometric studies, Piaget started developing the clinical method of examination. The clinical method included questioning a child and carefully examining their responses – in order to observe how the child reasoned according to the questions asked – and then examining the child's perception of the world through their responses. Piaget recognized the difficulties of interviewing a child and the importance of recognizing the difference between "liberated" versus "spontaneous" responses (Mayer, 2005, p. 372).

Piaget wanted to research in environments that would allow children to connect with some existing aspects of the world. The idea was to change the approach described in his book The Child's Conception of the World and move away from the vague questioning interviews. This new approach was described in his book The Child's Conception of Physical Causality, where children were presented with dilemmas and had to think of possible solutions on their own. Later, after carefully analyzing previous methods, Piaget developed a combination of naturalistic observation with clinical interviewing in his book Judgment and Reasoning in the Child, where a child's intellect was tested with questions and close monitoring. Piaget was convinced he had found a way to analyze and access a child's thoughts about the world in a very effective way (Mayer, 2005). Piaget's research provided a combination of theoretical and practical research methods and it has offered a crucial contribution to the field of developmental psychology (Beilin, 1992). "Piaget is often criticized because his method of investigation, though somewhat modified in recent years, is still largely clinical". He observes a child's surroundings and behavior. He then comes up with a hypothesis testing it and focusing on both the surroundings and behavior after changing a little of the surrounding.

== Influence ==
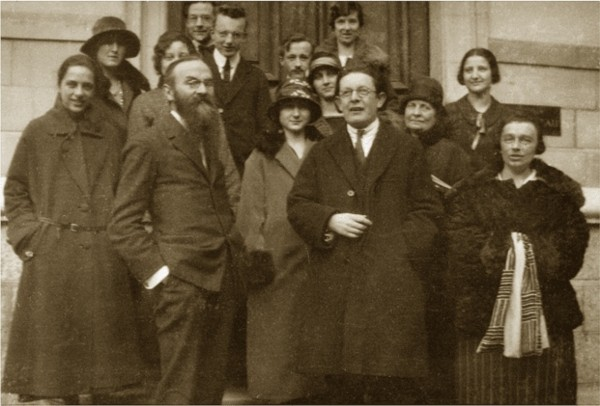
Photo of the Jean Piaget Foundation with Pierre Bovet (1878–1965) first row (with large beard) and Jean Piaget (1896–1980) first row (on the right, with glasses) in front of the Rousseau Institute (Geneva), 1925

Despite his ceasing to be a fashionable psychologist, the magnitude of Piaget's continuing influence can be measured by the global scale and activity of the Jean Piaget Society, which holds annual conferences and attracts around 700 participants. His theory of cognitive development has proved influential in many different areas:

- Developmental psychology
- Education and Morality
- Historical studies of thought and cognition
- Evolution
- Philosophy
- Primatology
- Artificial intelligence (AI)

=== Developmental psychology ===
Piaget is considered the most influential figure in developmental psychology, though many aspects of his theories are no longer accepted by mainstream psychologists. Developmental psychologists today do not view development as taking place in stages and many of Piaget's empirical findings have been overturned by subsequent research. For example, psychologists no longer view young children as being incapable of understanding abstract concepts, and no longer believe that babies do not understand object permanence. Despite this, developmental psychologists do acknowledge the importance of Piaget's legacy as the founder of their field. They recognize his innovative empirical work, his attempts to integrate his results into a unified theoretical model and the way he created a path for subsequent researchers to follow. Indeed, many developmental psychology researchers today work in a post-Piagetian or neo-Piagetian framework.

=== Education ===
By using Piaget's theory, educators focus on their students as learners. As a result of this focus, education is learner-centered and constructivist-based to an extent. It allows teachers to view students as individual learners who add new concepts to prior knowledge to construct, or build, understanding for themselves. Teachers who use a learner-centered approach as a basis for their professional practices incorporate the several dispositions. They provide experience-based educational opportunities. These teachers also contemplate the learners' individual qualities and attitudes during curriculum planning. Educators allow learners' insights to alter the curriculum. They nourish and support learners' curiosity. They also involve learners' emotions and create a learning environment in which students feel safe.

There are two differences between the preoperational and concrete operational stages that apply to education. These differences are reversibility and decentration. At times, reversibility and decentration occur at the same time. When students think about the steps to complete a task without using a particular logical, sequential order, they are using reversibility. Decentration allows them to concentrate on multiple components of a problematic task at a time. Students use both reversibility and decentration to function throughout the school day, follow directions, and complete assignments.

An example of a student using reversibility is when learning new vocabulary. The student creates a list of unfamiliar words from a literary text. Then, he researches the definition of those words before asking classmate to test him. His teacher has given a set of particular instructions that he must follow in a particular order: he must write the word before defining it, and complete these two steps repeatedly. A child in the preoperational stage gets confused during this process and needs assistance from the teacher to stay on task. The teacher refers him back to his text in order to notate the next word before he can define it. A child in the preoperational stage does not understand the organization required to complete this assignment. One in the concrete operational stage understands the organization, and can recall the steps in any order while being able to follow the order given. Using decentration, the child has the two activities on his mind: identify words and find them in the dictionary.

A sample of decentration is a preschooler may use a toy banana as a pretend telephone. The child knows the difference between the fruit and a phone. In this form of play, he is operating on two levels at once. In an older child at the concrete operational level, decentration allows him to complete subtraction of two-digit numbers and indicate which of the problems also involved borrowing from the other column. The student simultaneously does both. Using reversibility, the student has to move mentally between two subtasks.

Regarding the giving of praise by teachers, praise is a reinforcer for students. Adolescents undergo social-emotional development such that they seek rapport with peers. Thus, teacher praise is not as powerful for students who see teachers as authority figures. They give no value to praise provided by adults, or they have no respect for the individual who is giving praise.

During the 1970s and 1980s, Piaget's works also inspired the transformation of European and American education, including theory and practice, leading to a more 'child-centered' approach. In Conversations with Jean Piaget, Bringuier says: "Education, for most people, means trying to lead the child to resemble the typical adult of his society ... but for me and no one else, education means making creators... You have to make inventors, innovators—not conformists" (Bringuier, 1980, p. 132).

His theory of cognitive development can be used as a tool in the early childhood classroom. According to Piaget, children developed best in a classroom with interaction.

Piaget defined knowledge as the ability to modify, transform, and "operate on" an object or idea, such that it is understood by the operator through the process of transformation. Learning, then, occurs as a result of experience, both physical and logical, with the objects themselves and how they are acted upon. Thus, knowledge must be assimilated in an active process by a learner with matured mental capacity, so that knowledge can build in complexity by scaffolded understanding. Understanding is scaffolded by the learner through the process of equilibration, whereby the learner balances new knowledge with previous understanding, thereby compensating for "transformation" of knowledge.

Learning, then, can also be supported by instructors in an educational setting. Piaget specified that knowledge cannot truly be formed until the learner has matured the mental structures to which that learning is specific, and thereby development constrains learning. Nevertheless, knowledge can also be "built" by building on simpler operations and structures that have already been formed. Basing operations of an advanced structure on those of simpler structures thus scaffolds learning to build on operational abilities as they develop. Good teaching, then, is built around the operational abilities of the students such that they can excel in their operational stage and build on preexisting structures and abilities and thereby "build" learning.

Evidence of the effectiveness of a contemporary curricular design building on Piaget's theories of developmental progression and the support of maturing mental structures can be seen in Griffin and Case's "Number Worlds" curriculum. The curriculum works toward building a "central conceptual structure" of number sense in young children by building on five instructional processes, including aligning curriculum to the developmental sequencing of acquisition of specific skills. By outlining the developmental sequence of number sense, a conceptual structure is built and aligned to individual children as they develop.

The cognitive scientist Karen Fuson has argued that the impact of Piagetian theories in education has not been entirely positive because his work has frequently been misinterpreted. In particular, Piaget's focus on children's interactions with objects in the concrete operational stage has led to an approach to education in which young children are encouraged to learn mathematics by manipulating real objects, but without the necessary direct instruction from teachers that they need to understand what they are doing and to link their activities to symbolic mathematics. This has had a particularly negative impact on low-attaining children who need more support from a more knowledgeable other to make meaning and progress with their learning.

Psychologist Mark Seidenberg has criticised the field of education studies for placing too much emphasis on the works of Piaget, Lev Vygotsky and other historical psychologists while failing to keep up with the major advances in cognitive science in the decades since they were active. Meanwhile, a 2016 systematic review of education research showed that constructivist approaches to early childhood education inspired by Piaget and Vygotsky are less effective than comprehensive approaches that incorporate direct skills teaching.

=== Morality ===
Piaget believed in two basic principles relating to character education: that children develop moral ideas in stages and that children create their conceptions of the world. According to Piaget, "the child is someone who constructs his own moral world view, who forms ideas about right and wrong, and fair and unfair, that are not the direct product of adult teaching and that are often maintained in the face of adult wishes to the contrary" (Gallagher, 1978, p. 26). Piaget believed that children made moral judgments based on their own observations of the world.

Piaget's theory of morality was radical when his book The Moral Judgment of the Child was published in 1932 for two reasons: his use of philosophical criteria to define morality (as universalizable, generalizable, and obligatory) and his rejection of equating cultural norms with moral norms. Piaget, drawing on Kantian theory, proposed that morality developed out of peer interaction and that it was autonomous from authority mandates. Peers, not parents, were a key source of moral concepts such as equality, reciprocity, and justice.

Piaget attributed different types of psychosocial processes to different forms of social relationships, introducing a fundamental distinction between different types of said relationships. Where there is constraint because one participant holds more power than the other the relationship is asymmetrical, and, importantly, the knowledge that can be acquired by the dominated participant takes on a fixed and inflexible form. Piaget refers to this process as one of social transmission, illustrating it through reference to the way in which the elders of a tribe initiate younger members into the patterns of beliefs and practices of the group. Similarly, where adults exercise a dominating influence over the growing child, it is through social transmission that children can acquire knowledge. By contrast, in cooperative relations, power is more evenly distributed between participants so that a more symmetrical relationship emerges. Under these conditions, authentic forms of intellectual exchange become possible; each partner has the freedom to project his or her own thoughts, consider the positions of others, and defend his or her own point of view. In such circumstances, where children's thinking is not limited by a dominant influence, Piaget believed "the reconstruction of knowledge", or favorable conditions for the emergence of constructive solutions to problems, exists. Here the knowledge that emerges is open, flexible and regulated by the logic of argument rather than being determined by an external authority.

In short, cooperative relations provide the arena for the emergence of operations, which for Piaget requires the absence of any constraining influence, and is most often illustrated by the relations that form between peers (for more on the importance of this distinction see Duveen & Psaltis, 2008; Psaltis & Duveen, 2006, 2007). This is thus how, according to Piaget, children learn moral judgement as opposed to cultural norms (or maybe ideological norms).

Piaget's research on morality was highly influential in subsequent work on moral development, particularly in the case of Lawrence Kohlberg's highly influential stage theory of moral development which dominated moral psychology research until the end of the twentieth century.

=== Historical studies of thought and cognition ===
Historical changes of thought have been modeled in Piagetian terms. Broadly speaking these models have mapped changes in morality, intellectual life and cognitive levels against historical changes (typically in the complexity of social systems).

Notable examples include:

- Michael Horace Barnes' study of the co-evolution of religious and scientific thinking
- Peter Damerow's theory of prehistoric and archaic thought
- Kieran Egan's stages of understanding
- James W. Fowler's stages of faith development
- Suzi Gablik's stages of art history
- Christopher Hallpike's studies of changes in cognition and moral judgment in pre-historical, archaic and classical periods ... (Hallpike 1979, 2004)
- Lawrence Kohlberg's stages of moral development
- Don Lepan's theory of the origins of modern thought and drama
- Charles Radding's theory of the medieval intellectual development
- Jürgen Habermas's reworking of historical materialism.

=== Non-human development ===
Neo-Piagetian stages have been applied to the maximum stage attained by various animals. For example, spiders attain the circular sensory motor stage, coordinating actions and perceptions. Pigeons attain the sensory motor stage, forming concepts.

=== Origins ===
The origins of human intelligence have also been studied in Piagetian terms. Wynn (1979, 1981) analysed Acheulian and Oldowan tools in terms of the insight into spatial relationships required to create each kind. On a more general level, Robinson's Birth of Reason (2005) suggests a large-scale model for the emergence of a Piagetian intelligence.

=== Primatology ===
Piaget's models of cognition have also been applied outside the human sphere, and some primatologists assess the development and abilities of primates in terms of Piaget's model.

=== Philosophy ===
Philosophers have used Piaget's work. For example, the philosopher and social theorist Jürgen Habermas has incorporated Piaget into his work, most notably in The Theory of Communicative Action. The philosopher Thomas Kuhn credited Piaget's work with helping him to understand the transition between modes of thought which characterized his theory of paradigm shifts. Yet, that said, it is also noted that the implications of his later work do indeed remain largely unexamined. Shortly before his death (September 1980), Piaget was involved in a debate about the relationships between innate and acquired features of language, at the Centre Royaumont pour une Science de l'Homme, where he discussed his point of view with the linguist Noam Chomsky as well as Hilary Putnam and Stephen Toulmin.

=== Artificial intelligence ===
Piaget also had a considerable effect in the field of computer science and artificial intelligence. Seymour Papert used Piaget's work while developing the Logo programming language. Alan Kay used Piaget's theories as the basis for the Dynabook programming system concept, which was first discussed within the confines of the Xerox Palo Alto Research Center (Xerox PARC). These discussions led to the development of the Alto prototype, which explored for the first time all the elements of the graphical user interface (GUI), and influenced the creation of user interfaces in the 1980s and beyond.

== Criticisms ==
=== Criticisms of Piaget's methods ===
Judged by today's standards of psychological research, Piaget's research methods can be considered problematic. One modern reviewer said many of his "pioneering investigations would probably be rejected from most modern journals on methodological grounds of sample size, non-standard measurement, and lack of inter-rater reliability".

Piaget's research relied on very small samples that were not randomly selected. His book The Origins of Intelligence in Children was based on the study of just his own three children. This means that it is difficult to generalize his findings to the broader population. He interacted closely with his research subjects and did not follow a set script, meaning that experimental conditions were not the same from participant to participant.

As Piaget worked in the era before widespread use of voice recording equipment, his data collection method was simply to make handwritten notes in the field, which he would analyse himself. This differs from the modern practice of using multiple coders to ensure test validity. Critics such as Linda Siegel have argued that his experiments did not adequately control for social context and the child's understanding (or lack of understanding) of the language used in the test task, leading to mistaken conclusions about children's lack of reasoning skills.

These methodological issues mean scientists trying to replicate Piaget's experiments have found that small changes to his procedures lead to different results. For example, in his tests of object-permanence and conservation of number, the ages at which children pass the tests varies greatly based on small variations in the test procedure, challenging his theoretical interpretations of his test results.

=== Criticisms of Piaget's theoretical ideas ===
Piaget's theories have not gone without scrutiny. A figure whose ideas contradicted Piaget's ideas was the Russian psychologist Lev Vygotsky. Vygotsky stressed the importance of a child's cultural background as an effect on the stages of development. Because different cultures stress different social interactions, this challenged Piaget's theory that the hierarchy of learning development had to develop in succession. Vygotsky introduced the term Zone of proximal development as an overall task a child would have to develop that would be too difficult to develop alone.

Also, the so-called neo-Piagetian theories of cognitive development maintained that Piaget's theory does not do justice either to the underlying mechanisms of information processing that explain transition from stage to stage or individual differences in cognitive development. According to these theories, changes in information processing mechanisms, such as speed of processing and working memory, are responsible for ascension from stage to stage. Moreover, differences between individuals in these processes explain why some individuals develop faster than other individuals (Demetriou, 1998).

Over time, alternative theories of child development have been put forward, and empirical findings have done a lot to undermine Piaget's theories. For example, Esther Thelen and colleagues found that babies would not make the A-not-B error if they had small weights added to their arms during the first phase of the experiment that were then removed before the second phase of the experiment. This minor change should not impact babies' understanding of object permanence, so the difference that this makes to babies' performance on the A-not-B task cannot be explained by Piagetian theory. Thelen and colleagues also found that various other factors also influenced performance on the A-not-B task (including strength of memory trace, salience of targets, waiting time and stance), and proposed that this could be better explained using a dynamic systems theory approach than using Piagetian theory. Alison Gopnik and Betty Repacholi found that babies as young as 18 months old can understand that other people have desires, and that these desires could be very different from their own desires. This contradicts Piaget's view that children are very egocentric at this age.

Modern cognitive science had undermined Piaget's view that young children are unable to comprehend numbers as they are not able to work with abstract concepts in the sensorimotor stage. This Piagetian view has led many educators to believe that it is not appropriate to teach simple arithmetic to young children as it will not lead to real understanding. Experiments by Starkey et al. have shown that children have an understanding of abstract numbers from as young as 6 months old while more recent studies by Izard et al. have shown that even newborns can perceive abstract numbers. For a full discussion of this, see Stanislas Dehaene's The Number Sense: How the Mind Creates Mathematics.

Some supporters of Piaget counter that his critics' arguments depend on misreadings of Piaget's theory. See also Brian Rotman's Jean Piaget: Psychologist of the Real, an exposition and critique of Piaget's ideas, and Jonathan Tudge and Barbara Rogoff's "Peer influences on cognitive development: Piagetian and Vygotskian perspectives".

== Awards and honors ==
In 1972 Piaget was awarded the Erasmus Prize and in 1979 the Balzan Prize for Social and Political Sciences.

=== Appointments ===
- 1921–25 Research Director (Chef des travaux), Institut Jean-Jacques Rousseau, Geneva
- 1925–29 Professor of Psychology, Sociology and the Philosophy of Science, University of Neuchâtel
- 1929–39 Professeur extraordinaire of the History of Scientific Thought, University of Geneva
- 1929–67 Director, International Bureau of Education, Geneva
- 1932–71 Director, Institute of Educational Sciences, University of Geneva
- 1938–51 Professor of Experimental Psychology and Sociology, University of Lausanne
- 1939–51 Professor of Sociology, University of Geneva
- 1940–71 Professeur ordinaire of Experimental Psychology, University of Geneva
- 1952–64 Professor of Genetic Psychology, Sorbonne, Paris
- 1954–57 President, International Union of Scientific Psychology
- 1955–80 Director, International Centre for Genetic Epistemology, Geneva
- 1971–80 Emeritus Professor, University of Geneva

=== Honorary doctorates ===
- 1936 Harvard
- 1946 Sorbonne
- 1949 University of Brazil
- 1949 Bruxelles
- 1953 Chicago
- 1954 McGill
- 1958 Warsaw
- 1959 Manchester
- 1960 Oslo
- 1960 Cambridge
- 1962 Brandeis
- 1964 Montreal
- 1964 Aix-Marseille
- 1966 Pennsylvania
- 1966? Barcelona
- 1970 Yale
- 1971 Temple

== List of major works ==
The following groupings are based on the number of citations in Google Scholar.

=== The most-cited publications in English ===
- The Language and Thought of the Child (London: Routledge & Kegan Paul, 1926) [Le Langage et la pensée chez l'enfant (1923)]
- The Child's Conception of the World. Translated by Joan and Andrew Tomlinson. London: Routledge and Kegan Paul. 1928 – via Internet Archive. [La Représentation du monde chez l'enfant (1926, orig. pub. as an article, 1925)]
- Judgment and Reasoning in the Child (Harcourt, Brace and Company 1928).
- The Moral Judgment of the Child (London: Kegan Paul, Trench, Trubner and Co., 1932) [Le jugement moral chez l'enfant (1932)]
- The Origins of Intelligence in Children (New York: International University Press, 1952) [La naissance de l'intelligence chez l'enfant (1936), also translated as The Origin of Intelligence in the Child (London: Routledge and Kegan Paul, 1953)].
- Play, Dreams and Imitation in Childhood (New York: Norton, 1962) [La formation du symbole chez l'enfant; imitation, jeu et reve, image et représentation (1945)].
- The Psychology of Intelligence (London: Routledge and Kegan Paul, 1950) [La psychologie de l'intelligence (1947)].
- The construction of reality in the child (New York: Basic Books, 1954) [La construction du réel chez l'enfant (1950), also translated as The Child's Construction of Reality (London: Routledge and Kegan Paul, 1955)].
- With Inhelder, B., The Growth of Logical Thinking from Childhood to Adolescence (New York: Basic Books, 1958) [De la logique de l'enfant à la logique de l'adolescent (1955)].
- With Inhelder, B., The Psychology of the Child (New York: Basic Books, 1962) [La psychologie de l'enfant (1966, orig. pub. as an article, 1950)].
- The early growth of logic in the child (London: Routledge and Kegan Paul, 1964) [La genèse des structures logiques elementaires (1959)].
- With Inhelder, B., The Child's Conception of Space (New York: W.W. Norton, 1967).
- "Piaget's theory" in P. Mussen (ed.), Handbook of Child Psychology, Vol. 1. (4th ed., New York: Wiley, 1983).
- The Child's Conception of Number (London: Routledge and Kegan Paul, 1952) [La genèse du nombre chez l'enfant (1941)].
- Structuralism (New York: Harper & Row, 1970) [Le Structuralisme (1968)].
- Genetic epistemology (New York: W.W. Norton, 1971, ISBN 978-0-393-00596-7).

=== Less-cited ===
- The Child's Conception of Physical Causality (London: Kegan Paul, 1930) [La causalite physique chez l'enfant (1927)]
- Child's Conception of Geometry (New York, Basic Books, 1960) [La Géométrie spontanée de l'enfant (1948)].
- The Principles of Genetic Epistemology (New York: Basic Books, 1972, ISBN 978-0-393-00596-7) [L'épistémologie génétique (1950)].
- To understand is to invent: The future of education (New York: Grossman Publishers, 1973) [tr. of Ou va l'education (1971) and Le droit a l'education dans le monde actuel (1948)].
- Six psychological studies (New York: Random House, 1967) [Six études de psychologie (1964)].
- Biology and Knowledge (Chicago: University of Chicago Press, 1971) [Biologie et connaissance; essai sur les relations entre les régulations organiques et les processus cognitifs (1967)]
- Science of education and the psychology of the child (New York: Orion Press, 1970) [Psychologie et pédagogie (1969)].
- Intellectual evolution from adolescence to adulthood (Cambridge: Cambridge Univ. Press, 1977) [L'evolution intellectuelle entre l'adolescence et l'age adulte (1970)].
- The Equilibration of Cognitive Structures: The Central Problem of Intellectual Development (Chicago: University of Chicago Press, 1985) [L'equilibration des structures cognitives (1975), previously translated as The development of thought: Equilibration of cognitive structures (1977)].
- Massimo Piattelli-Palmarini (ed.), Language and learning: the debate between Jean Piaget and Noam Chomsky (Cambridge, Mass.: Harvard University Press, 1980) [Theories du language, theories de l'apprentissage (1979)].
- Development and learning.
- The Grasp of Consciousness: Action and concept in the young child (London: Routledge and Kegan Paul, 1977) [La prise de conscience (1974)].
- The Mechanisms of Perception (New York: Basic Books, 1969) [Les mécanismes perceptifs: modèles probabilistes, analyse génétique, relations avec l'intelligence (1961)].
- Psychology and Epistemology: Towards a Theory of Knowledge (Harmondsworth: Penguin, 1972) [Psychologie et epistémologie (1970).
- The Child's Conception of Time (London: Routledge and Kegan Paul, 1969) [Le développement de la notion de temps chez l'enfant (1946)]
- Logic and Psychology (Manchester: Manchester University Press, 1953).
- Memory and intelligence (New York: Basic Books, 1973) [Memoire et intelligence (1968)]
- The Origin of the Idea of Chance in Children (London: Routledge and Kegan Paul, 1975) [La genèse de l'idée de hasard chez l'enfant (1951)].
- with Inhelder, B., Mental Imagery in the Child: A Study of the Development of Imaginal Representation (London: Routledge and Kegan Paul, 1971) [L'image mentale chez l'enfant : études sur le développement des représentations imaginées (1966)].
- Intelligence and Affectivity. Their Relationship during Child Development (Palo Alto: Annual Reviews, 1981) [Les relations entre l'intelligence et l'affectivité dans le développement de l'enfant (1954)].
- with Beth, E.W., Mathematical Epistemology and Psychology (Dordrecht: D. Reidel, 1966) [Épistémologie mathématique et psychologie: Essai sur les relations entre la logique formelle et la pensée réelle] (1961).
- With Brown, Terrance. Eames, Stewart (Translator). Adaptation and Intelligence: Organic Selection and Phenocopy (University of Chicago Press, 1980).
- With Garcia, R. Psychogenesis and the History of Science (New York: Columbia University Press, 1989) Psychogenèse et histoire des sciences (1983).

=== New translations ===
- Piaget, J. (1995). Sociological Studies. London: Routledge.
- Piaget, J. (2000). "Commentary on Vygotsky". New Ideas in Psychology. 18 (2–3): 241–59. doi:10.1016/S0732-118X(00)00012-X.
- Piaget, J. (2001). Studies in Reflecting Abstraction. Hove, UK: Psychology Press.

== See also ==
- Active learning
- Cognitive acceleration
- Cognitivism (learning theory)
- Constructivist epistemology
- Developmental psychology
- Fluid and crystallized intelligence
- Guðmundur Finnbogason
- Horizontal and vertical décalage
- Inquiry-based learning
- Kohlberg's stages of moral development
- Psychosocial development
- Religious development
- Water-level task

=== Collaborators ===
- Edith Ackermann
- Leo Apostel
- Edgar Ascher
- Evert Beth
- Magali Bovet
- Guy Cellérier
- Paul Fraisse
- Rolando García
- Pierre Gréco
- Jean-Blaise Grize
- Gil Henriques
- Bärbel Inhelder
- Benoit Mandelbrot
- Albert Morf
- Pierre Oléron
- Seymour Papert
- Maurice Reuchlin
- Hermina Sinclair de-Zwart
- Alina Szemińska
- Huê Vinh-Bang

=== Translators ===
- Eleanor Duckworth
- Wolfe Mays
