= Kieran Egan (philosopher) =

Irish educational philosopher (1942–2022)

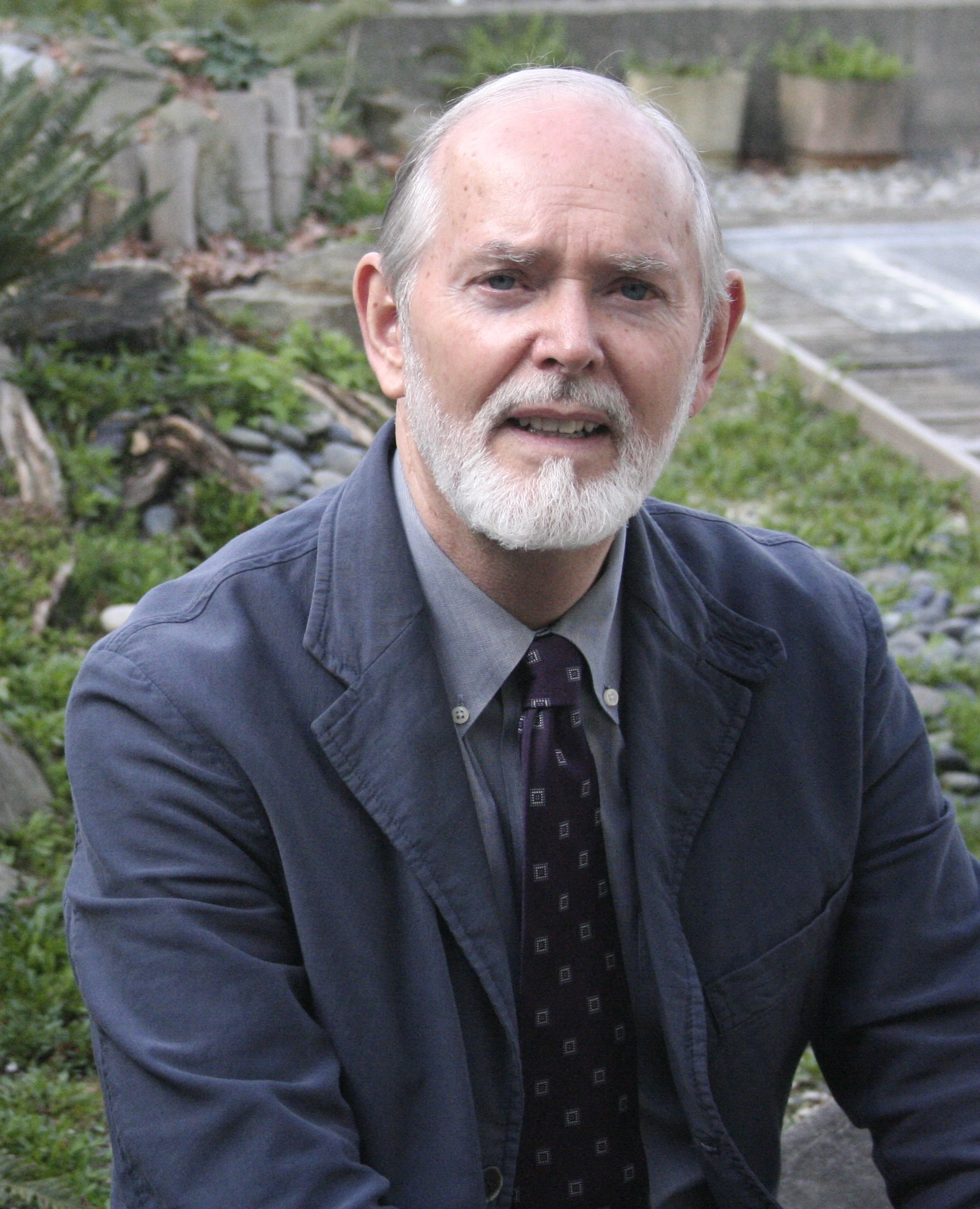
- Egan in 2004
- Born: 1942 Ireland
- Died: 12 May 2022 (aged 79–80)
- Occupation: Author, Professor of Education, Canada Research Chair in Education

Kieran Egan (1942 – 12 May 2022) was an Irish educational philosopher and a student of the classics, anthropology, cognitive psychology, and cultural history. He has written on issues in education and child development, with an emphasis on the uses of imagination and the stages (Egan called them "understandings") that occur during a person's intellectual development. He has questioned the work of Jean Piaget and progressive educators, notably Herbert Spencer and John Dewey.

He taught at Simon Fraser University. His major work is the 1997 book The Educated Mind.

== Early life ==
Egan was born in 1942 in Clonmel, Ireland, and was raised and educated in England. After a brief period as a novice in a Franciscan monastery, he graduated from the University of London with a Bachelor of Arts degree in history in 1966. He subsequently worked as a research fellow at the Institute for Comparative Studies in Kingston upon Thames. He then moved to the United States and began a PhD in the philosophy of education at the Stanford Graduate School of Education. Egan completed his PhD at Cornell University in 1972.

== Career ==
Kieran Egan was the director of the Imaginative Education Research Group, which was founded by the Faculty of Education at Simon Fraser University. The goal of this group is to improve education on a global scale by developing and proliferating the ideas of Imaginative Education.

== Educated Mind ==
=== Criticism of previous education theories ===
Egan argued that beneath many of the debates around schools was a more fundamental disagreement: what should the goal of education be? He pointed to three major options:

1. to give students the same understandings and habits to help them succeed in society. (Egan called this the "socialization" goal, and suggested it may have been the original purpose of schools.)
2. to give students an understanding of truth, allowing them to change society. (Egan called this the "academic" goal, and suggested that this goal was introduced by Plato.)
3. to give students the chance to develop their own understandings and skills through a process of self-discovery, allowing them to create themselves as individuals. (Egan called this the "psychological" goal, and suggested it came from Rousseau.)

Egan argued that, when facing these three appealing goals, educational leaders often seek a compromise by combining them together. This, he wrote, was a mistake, the fundamental cause of why schools struggle to educate students well: "these three ideas are mutually incompatible, and this is the primary cause of our long-continuing educational crisis"; the present educational program in much of the West attempts to integrate all three of these incompatible ideas, resulting in a failure to effectively achieve any of the three. Throughout his career, he attempted to develop a new theoretical grounding for education.

=== "Cultural toolkits" theory ===
Egan suggested that people learn through specific cognitive tools. These tools can be helpfully grouped into five "cultural toolkits", which (excepting the first) don't develop "naturally". Each was the centuries-long creation of a culture; a student can adopt them as they struggle to understand the world.

1. Somatic toolkit: the innate ways of understanding the world that come even before a child acquires language, including bodily senses, emotions, imitation, and humor.
2. Mythic toolkit: the ways of understanding the world that come when a person first learns to speak, including stories, metaphors, binary opposites, mental imagery, jokes, and riddles.
3. Romantic toolkit: the ways of understanding the world that come when a person masters the skills of reading and writing, including wonder and mystery, a sense of the heroic, and a thirst for the limits of reality.
4. Philosophic toolkit: the ways of understanding the world that come when a person has already learned so much about a topic that they can think about it theoretically. These include the search for authority & truth, general schemes & anomalies, hypotheses & experiments, and metanarratives.
5. Ironic toolkit: the ways of understanding the world that come when a person has mastered all the previous toolkits, and finds them insufficient to describe the world. These tools include ambiguity, an appreciation for the limits of understanding, and a flexible, Socratic stance toward ideas.

Education, Egan argued, is the process of helping a student gain and wield these tools. Egan suggested that this approach provides an alternative to the traditional three contradictory goals of education.

Egan's lifelong work was to understand how these tools first developed in history, how they developed in the lives of individual learners, and how teachers could help students develop them to enrich their understanding of reality.

To do this, he drew from fields as diverse as evolutionary history, anthropology, cultural history, and cognitive psychology, and worked with students and teachers around the world.

Students, Egan observed, tend to add on these toolkits in the order they first developed. In sharp distinction from Recapitulation theory (common in the late 19th and early 20th century), Egan suggested that these types of understanding are not "stages" that are moved through, but toolkits to be added on: the mythic toolkit modifies the somatic, the romantic modifies the mythic and somatic, and so on. Also, there is no guarantee a person will gain all the toolkits — many people do not.

== Personal life ==
Egan was an atheist, but described himself as a "Catholic atheist". He died on 12 May 2022.

== Main works ==
- 1976 Structural Communication. Fearon Publishers, Belmont, Calif. ISBN 0-8224-6550-7
- 1979 Educational Development. Oxford University Press, New York. ISBN 0-19-502458-3
- 1983 Education and Psychology: Plato, Piaget, and Scientific Psychology. Teachers College Press, Columbia University, New York; London. ISBN 0-8077-2717-2
- 1988 Primary Understanding: Education in Early Childhood. Routledge, New York. ISBN 0-415-90003-4
- 1988 Imagination and Education. Teachers College Press, New York. ISBN 0-8077-2878-0
- 1989 Teaching as Story Telling: An Alternative Approach to Teaching and Curriculum in the Elementary School. University of Chicago Press, Chicago. ISBN 0-226-19031-5
- 1990 Romantic Understanding: The Development of Rationality and Imagination, Ages 8-15. Routledge, New York. ISBN 0-415-90050-6
- 1992 Imagination in Teaching and Learning: The Middle School Years. University of Chicago Press, Chicago. ISBN 0-226-19033-1
- 1997 The Educated Mind: How Cognitive Tools Shape Our Understanding. University of Chicago Press, Chicago. ISBN 0-226-19036-6
- 1999 Children's Minds, Talking Rabbits & Clockwork Oranges: Essays on Education. Teachers College Press, New York. ISBN 0-8077-3808-5
- 2002 Getting it Wrong from the Beginning: Our Progressivist Inheritance from Herbert Spencer, John Dewey, and Jean Piaget. Yale University Press, New Haven. ISBN 0-300-09433-7
- 2005 An Imaginative Approach to Teaching. Jossey-Bass, San Francisco, CA. ISBN 0-7879-7157-X
- 2006 Teaching Literacy: Engaging the Imagination of New Readers and Writers. Corwin Press, Thousand Oaks, Calif. ISBN 1-4129-2788-9
- 2008 The Future of Education: Reimaging Our Schools from the Ground Up. Yale University Press, New Haven, CT. ISBN 978-0-300-11046-3
- 2010 Learning in Depth: A Simple Innovation that Can Transform Schooling. University of Chicago Press, Chicago, IL. ISBN 978-0-226-19043-3
- 2014 Whole School Projects: Engaging Imaginations Through Interdisciplinary Inquiry. Teachers College Press, New York. ISBN 978-0-807-75583-9
- 2015 Imagination and the Engaged Learner: Cognitive Tools for the Classroom. Teachers College Press, New York. ISBN 978-0-807-75714-7

== Awards and honors ==
- 1991: University of Louisville Grawemeyer Award in Education
- 1993: Elected to the Royal Society of Canada
- 2000: Elected as Foreign Associate member of the National Academy of Education (U.S.)
- 2001: Killam Research Fellowship
- 2001: Appointed to a Canada Research Chair in Education
- 2010: Utne Reader magazine listed Egan as one of the "25 Visionaries Who Are Changing Your World."
