= Genetic epistemology =

Study of the origins of knowledge

Genetic epistemology or 'developmental theory of knowledge' is a study of the origins (genesis) of knowledge (epistemology) established by Swiss psychologist Jean Piaget. This theory opposes traditional epistemology and unites constructivism and structuralism. Piaget took epistemology as the starting point and adopted the method of genetics, arguing that all knowledge of the child is generated through interaction with the environment.

== Aims ==
The goal of genetic epistemology is to link the knowledge to the model of its construction – i.e., the context in which knowledge is gained affects its perception, quality, and degree of retention. Further, genetic epistemology seeks to explain the process of cognitive development (from birth) in four primary stages: sensorimotor (birth to age 2), pre-operational (2–7), concrete operational (7–11), and formal operational (11 years onward).

As an example, consider that for children in the sensorimotor stage, teachers should try to provide a rich and stimulating environment with ample objects to play with. Then with children in the concrete operational stage, learning activities should involve problems of classification, ordering, location, conservation using concrete objects. The main focus is on the younger years of development. Assimilation occurs when the perception of a new event or object occurs to the learner in an existing schema and is usually used in the context of self-motivation. In Accommodation, one accommodates the experiences according to the outcome of the tasks. The highest form of development is equilibration. Equilibration encompasses both assimilation and accommodation as the learner changes how they think to get a better answer.

Piaget believed that knowledge is a biological function that results from the actions of an individual through change. He also stated that knowledge consists of structures, and comes about by the adaptation of these structures with the environment.

== Types of knowledge ==
Piaget proposes three types of knowledge: physical, logical mathematical, and social knowledge.

Physical knowledge: It refers to knowledge related to objects in the world, which can be acquired through perceptual properties. The acquisition of physical knowledge has been equated with learning in Piaget's theory (Gruber and Voneche, 1995). In other words, thought is fit directly to experience.

Piaget also called his view constructivism, because he firmly believed that knowledge acquisition is a process of continuous self-construction. That is, Knowledge is not out there, external to the child and waiting to be discovered. But neither is it wholly performed within the child, ready to emerge as the child develops with the world surrounding her ... Piaget believed that children actively approach their environments and acquire knowledge through their actions.

== See also ==
- Constructivist epistemology
- Cognitive psychology
- Educational psychology
- Evolutionary epistemology
- General semantics
- Genetic structuralism
- Learning styles
- Learning theory
- Ontogeny recapitulates phylogeny
- Theory of cognitive development
