= The Educated Mind =

Book by Kieran Egan

- Author: Kieran Egan
- Publication date: 1997
- ISBN: 0-226-19036-6

The Educated Mind: How Cognitive Tools Shape Our Understanding is a 1997 book on educational theory by Kieran Egan.

== Main arguments ==
=== Criticism of previous education theories ===
Egan argues that much educational theorizing pivots around three basic ideas about the aim of education:

1. to educate people in content that would give them a "privileged and rational view of reality" (Plato). Here we find the following ideas: reason and knowledge can provide privileged access to the world; knowledge drives the student's mental development; education is an epistemological process.
2. to realize the right of every individual to pursue his own educational curriculum through self-discovery (Rousseau). Student development drives knowledge, and education is a psychological process.
3. to Socialize the child - to homogenize children and ensure that they can fulfill a useful role in society, according to its values and beliefs.

Egan argues in Chapter One that "these three ideas are mutually incompatible, and this is the primary cause of our long-continuing educational crisis"; the present educational program in much of the West attempts to integrate all three of these incompatible ideas, resulting in a failure to effectively achieve any of the three.

=== "Cultural recapitulation" theory ===
Egan argues that knowledge and understanding arise through five kinds of understanding. This development can be explained by "logical and psychological pressures." Egan differentiates his theory from the conceptions of recapitulation common in the late 19th century and early 20th century.

People can learn cognitive tools that are grouped and classified into five kinds of understanding:

1. Somatic - somatic understanding is the innate understanding of one's physical functions as well as emotions. This understanding persists in the way children "model their overall social structure in play". This understanding comes before language acquisition and the development of language
2. Mythic - mythic understanding is understanding of "binary opposites" such as Tall/Short or Good/Evil. Tools or methods such as images, metaphor, and story-structure are used in pre-literate sense-making.
3. Romantic - romantic understanding occurs when the "limits of reality" are discovered. At this stage, there is a desire to explore the limits of reality, an interest in the transcendent qualities of things, and "engagement with knowledge represented as a product of human emotions and intentions" (p. 254)
4. Philosophic - philosophic understanding is the creation of principles which underlie patterns and limits found in data, and the ordering of knowledge into coherent general schemes.
5. Ironic - ironic understanding is the "mental flexibility to recognize how inadequately flexible are our minds, and the languages we use, to the world we try to represent in them". This includes the ability to consider alternative philosophic explanations, and is characterized by a Socratic stance in the world.

"Drawing from an extensive study of cultural history and evolutionary history and the field of cognitive psychology and anthropology, Egan gives a detailed account of how these various forms of understanding have been created and distinguished in our cultural history".

Each stage includes a set of "cognitive tools", as Egan calls them, that enrich our understanding of reality. Egan suggests that recapitulating these stages is an alternative to the contradictions between the Platonic, Rousseauian and socialising goals of education.

Egan resists the suggestion that religious understanding could be a further last stage, arguing instead that religious explanations are examples of ironic understanding preserving a richly developed somatic understanding.

== Connections with other authors ==
Egan's main influence comes from the Russian psychologist Lev Vygotsky. The idea of applying theory of recapitulation to education came from 19th century philosopher Herbert Spencer, although Egan uses it in a very different way. Egan also uses educational ideas from William Wordsworth and expresses regret that Wordsworth's ideas, because they were expressed in poetry, are rarely considered today.

== In popular culture ==
The same year the essay was published (1997), Italian comedian-satirist Daniele Luttazzi used Egan's ideas for his character Prof. Fontecedro in the popular TV show Mai dire Gol, aired on Italia 1. Fontecedro was satirizing the inadequacies of the Italian school system, and the reforms proposed by Luigi Berlinguer, 1996-2000 Ministry of Education of Italy. Fontecedro's sketches brought Egan's theory to extreme levels with surreal humor. The jokes were later published in the book Cosmico! (1998, Mondadori, ISBN 88-04-46479-8), where the five stages of mind development are also cited at pp. 45–47. In 2023, a review of the book won the blog Astral Codex Ten's annual book review contest.

== See also ==
- Merlin Donald
- Northrop Frye's The Educated Imagination (1964)

== Editions ==
- Kieran Egan (1997). The educated mind: How Cognitive Tools Shape Our Understanding. Chicago: University of Chicago Press. ISBN 0-226-19036-6.
