= Constructive developmental framework =

Concept in developmental psychology

The constructive developmental framework (CDF) is a theoretical framework for epistemological and psychological assessment of adults. The framework is based on empirical developmental research showing that an individual's perception of reality is an actively constructed "world of their own", unique to them and which they continue to develop over their lifespan.

CDF was developed by Otto Laske based on the work of Robert Kegan and Michael Basseches, Laske's teachers at Harvard University. The CDF methodology involves three separate instruments that respectively measure a person's social–emotional stage, cognitive level of development, and psychological profile. It provides three epistemological perspectives on individual clients as well as teams. These constructs are designed to probe how an individual and/or group constructs the real world conceptually, and how close an individual's present thinking approaches the complexity of the real world.

== Overview ==
The methodology of CDF is grounded in empirical research on positive adult development which began under Lawrence Kohlberg in the 1960s, continued by Robert Kegan (1982, 1994), Michael Basseches 1984, and Otto Laske (1998, 2006, 2009, 2015, 2018). Laske (1998, 2009) introduced concepts from Georg Wilhelm Friedrich Hegel's philosophy and the Frankfurt School into the framework, making a strict differentiation between social–emotional and cognitive development.

Kegan (1982) described five stages of development, of which the latter four are progressively attained only in adulthood. Basseches (1984) showed that adults potentially transcend formal logical thinking by way of dialectical thinking, in four phases, measurable by a fluidity index. Both Kegan's and Basseches' findings were updated and refined by Laske in 2005 and 2008 respectively. In 2008 and 2015, Laske proposed that dialectical thought forms are an instantiation of Roy Bhaskar's four moments of dialectic (MELD; Bhaskar 1993), and that these ontological moments form a sequence M→E→L→D that underlies individual cognitive development (Laske 2015), providing a basis for a dialectical cognitive science as well as a cognitively oriented management science. Based on the concept of 'dialogical dialectic', Laske stressed the need for a dialogical, in contrast to a monological, social science. The CDF methodology involves three separate instruments that respectively measure a person's social–emotional stage ('what should I do and for whom?'), cognitive level of development ('what can I know and what therefore are my options?'), and psychological profile ('how am I doing right now?'). The first two tools (ED, CD) provide an epistemological, the third (NP) a psychological, perspective on a person or team. See the list of references below.

In CDF, social-emotional, cognitive, and psychological assessment are arrived at separately, as follows:

1. A person's social-emotional profile addresses the question "What should I do and for whom?"; it is evaluated based on a semi-structured 1-hour interview in terms of "stages" (created by Kegan-Lahey in 1988, refined by Laske 2005).
2. A person's cognitive profile addresses the question "What can I know and what consequently are my options?"; it is evaluated based on a semi-structured 1-hour interview in terms of "dialectical thought forms" and the fluidity of their use during the interview or in a written text (Basseches 1984; refined by Laske 2008).
3. A person's psychological profile addresses the question "How am I presently doing?"; it is evaluated based on Morris Aderman's Need-Press Questionnaire (NP) grounded in Henry Murray's theory of personality (Aderman 1970).

In CDF, each of these profiles by itself is considered a pure abstraction since it is only in their togetherness that the "hidden dimensions of a person's consciousness" can be empirically understood and made the basis of an intervention. Importantly, a CDF intervention requires dialectical thinking, in contrast to purely logical thinking as used in positivistic research. For this reason, CDF is a model of dialogical, not monological, research.

== Social–emotional development ==
=== Stages of adult development ===
According to the developmental psychologist Robert Kegan, a person's self-concept evolves in a series of stages through their lifetime. Such evolution is driven alternately by two main motivations: that of being autonomous and that of belonging to a group. Human beings are "controlled" by these motivations in the sense that they do not have influence on them but are rather defined by them. Additionally, these motivations are in conflict and their relationship develops over a lifespan.

Kegan describes 5 stages of development, of which the latter 4 are progressively attained in adulthood, although only a small proportion of adults reach the fourth stage and beyond:

- Stage 1: Purely impulse or reflex-driven (infancy and early childhood).
- Stage 2: The person's sense of self is ruled by their needs and wishes. The needs and wishes of others are relevant only to the extent that they support those of the person. Effectively the person and others inhabit two "separate worlds" (childhood and adolescence).
- Stage 3: The person's sense of self is socially determined, based on the real or imagined expectations of others (post-adolescence).
- Stage 4: The person's sense of self is determined by a set of values that they have authored for themselves (rarely achieved, only in adulthood).
- Stage 5: The person's sense of self is no longer bound to any particular aspect of themselves or their history, and they are free to allow themselves to focus on the flow of their lives.

CDF refers to such stages as "social–emotional" in that they relate to the way a person makes meaning of their experience in the social world. CDF holds that people are rarely precisely at a single stage but more accurately are distributed over a range where they are subject to the conflicting influences of a higher and a lower stage.

=== Assessing the social–emotional profile of a person ===
The social–emotional profile of person is assessed by means of an interview, referred to as the "subject–object" interview. In the interview, the interviewer offers prompts such as "success", "change", "control", "limits", "frustration", and "risk" and invites the interviewee to describe meaningful experiences under those headings. The interviewer serves as a listener, whose role is to focus the attention of the interviewee onto their own thoughts and feelings.

The interview is scored by identifying excerpts of speech that indicate a particular stage or sub-stage. Relevant sections are chosen from the transcript of the interview and analyzed for indications of the stage of development. The most frequent sub-stage revealed by the scoring is described as the interviewee's "centre of gravity". Stages scored at below the center of gravity are described as "risk" (of regression) while stages scored above the center of gravity are described as "potential" (for development). The distribution of scores is summarized by a "risk–clarity–potential" index (RCP) that can be used to characterize the nature of the developmental challenges facing a person.

== Cognitive development ==
=== Eras of adult cognitive development ===
According to Jean Piaget, thinking develops in 4 stages from childhood to young adulthood. Piaget named these stages sensory-motor, pre-operational, concrete-operational, and formal-operational. Development of formal-operational thinking is considered to continue until approximately the 25th year of life. Subsequent researchers have concentrated on the now famous question of Kohlberg: "Is there a life after 25?" In CDF, the development of post formal-operational thinking in an adult is indicated primarily by the strength of dialectical thinking measured in thought form use fluidity.

Following Bhaskar (1993), in CDF, human thinking is seen as developing in four sequential phases or 'eras', termed 'common sense', 'understanding', 'reason' and finally 'practical wisdom'. The first three phases of thinking development can be related to the different thinking systems put forward by the philosophers Locke, Kant and Hegel. Each phase includes and transcends the thinking system of the previous phase. The final phase of 'practical wisdom' loops back to a higher form of 'common sense' in that it constitutes sophisticated thinking that has become second nature and is therefore effortless. In contrast to other adult development researchers such as Fischer and Commons, Laske describes post-formal cognitive development in terms of the use and co-ordination of dialectical thought forms and thought form constellations which were described by Basseches as mental schemata.

=== Four classes of dialectical thought forms ===
Dialectical thinking has its roots in Greek classical philosophy but is also found in ancient Hindu and Buddhist philosophy, and relates to the search for truth through reasoned argument. It finds its foremost expression in the work of the German philosopher Georg Hegel. Essentially, dialectics is viewed as the system by which human thought attempts to capture the nature of reality. Building on Bhaskar and Basseches, CDF uses a framework for dialectical thinking based on the idea that everything in reality is transient and composed of contradictions, part of a larger whole, related in some way to everything else, and subject to sudden transformation. This framework therefore distinguishes dialectical thinking in terms of four classes of dialectical thought forms that can be said to define reality:

- Process (P) – constant change; emergence from absence: this class of thought forms describes how things or systems emerge, evolve and disappear;
- Context (C) – stable structures: this class of thought forms describes how things are part of the structure of a larger, stable, organized whole. The contextualization of parts within a whole gives rise to different perspectives or points of view;
- Relationship (R) – unity in diversity; totality: this class of thought forms describes how things (which are all part of a larger whole) are related and the nature of their common ground;
- Transformation (T) – balance and evolution including breakdown: this class of thought forms describes how living systems are in constant development and transformation, potentially via a collapse of the previous form of organization, and subject to the influence of human agency.

In addition, CDF distinguishes seven individual thought forms for every class, making a total of 28 thought forms, representing a re-formulation of Basseches' 24 schematas.

=== The cognitive profile of a person ===
The cognitive profile describes the thinking tools at a person's disposal and shows the degree to which a person's thinking has developed as indicated by their use of dialectical thought forms in the four classes. The profile is derived by means of a semi-structured interview where the interviewer has the task of eliciting the interviewee's use of thought forms in a conversation about the interviewee's work and workplace. The text of the interview is subsequently analyzed and scored to give a series of mathematical indicators.

According to CDF, thinking that is highly developed is represented by the following features:

- a balanced use of all four classes of dialectical thought forms (P, C, R, T)
- a high index of systemic thinking—meaning the use of transformative thought forms (T) and
- balanced use of critical and constructive thought forms (P+R) vs. (C+T)

== Link between social–emotional development and cognitive development ==
Social–emotional and cognitive development are often seen as separate lines of development but Laske (2008) proposed that they are linked by "stages of reflective judgment" or "epistemic position", described as the view taken by a person on what constitutes "knowledge" and "truth". Epistemic position defines a person's ability to deal with uncertainty and insecurity in their knowledge of the world and, together with the stage of social–emotional development, reflects the "stance" that a person takes towards the world. Whilst cognitive development provides a person with "tools" for thinking consisting of thought forms derived from both logic and dialectics, the "stance" that a person takes determines whether they apply the thinking tools at their disposal.

== Personality ==
=== Psychogenic needs and press ===
CDF employs the theory put forward by psychologist Henry Murray that much of human behavior is determined by the effort to satisfy certain psychological (or "psychogenic") needs, most of which are unconscious. Personality is thus seen as characteristic behavior emerging from the dynamic between a person's pattern of psychogenic needs and the environmental forces acting on that person—termed "press".

The need–press analysis draws on Sigmund Freud's model of the human psyche divided into the components of Id, Ego and Super-ego. In living, a person is subject to the unconscious yearnings of the Id, whilst consciously aspiring to certain ideals imposed by the Super-ego, which itself is influenced by the social context. It is the dynamic balance between the forces of Id and Super-ego and the work environment that determines a person's capacity for work. Imbalances between the social reality of work and a person's ideals lead to frustration, and imbalances between a person's unconscious needs and their ideals lead to a waste of energy or "energy sink."

=== The personality profile of a person ===
CDF assessment methodology uses a self-report psychometric questionnaire originated by Henry Murray's student Morris Aderman, called the need–press (NP) inventory.

The questionnaire assesses psychological characteristics in terms of three categories: self-conduct, task focus, and interpersonal perspective,, each of them defined by 6 variables assessed independently. The questionnaire compares a person's current needs with 1) what they would be like in an ideal (moral) world and 2) what they perceive they are offered in actuality (such as a specific cultural environment they are in tune or at odds with). Each category is composed of several categories (scales) such as: need for control, drive to achieve, affiliation etc. Comparisons and interpretation can be made between a person's scores for "Need", and their scores for ideal and actual "Press". Comparisons can also be made between a person's scores and those of the group of people with whom they are working. Finally, NP scores can be linked to developmental scores (ED & CD), whether of an individual or team.

== Applications ==
=== Assessment of work capability ===
The assessment methodology employed by CDF was created to measure peoples' capability and capacity for work. The theory of work used by CDF is derived from the work of Elliott Jaques. According to Jaques, work is defined as the application of reflective judgment in order to pursue certain goals within certain time limits. This definition stresses the importance of how decisions are made in a complex world and the time-span within which decisions are carried out. While Jaques offers a strictly cognitive definition of work, CDF views the social–emotional aspects of work as equally important, also including the person's (manager's, CEO's) NP profile.

CDF distinguishes between two kinds of work capability, applied and potential. Applied capability refers to the resources that an individual can already apply in order to carry out work. Potential capability refers to the resources that an individual may be capable of applying in the future. An individual can decide at any time not to apply their potential work capability. Equally circumstances may impede a person from applying their potential capability. Work capability is therefore not the same as the capacity to deliver work but rather defines and limits it.

In CDF work capacity is measured in terms of the need–press personality profile, whilst applied capability is measured in terms of the 'cognitive score', i.e., the proportional use of thinking tools provided by the four classes of thought forms) shown up by the cognitive profile, and potential capability is measured in terms of the relationship (epistemological balance) of the cognitive systems thinking index (STI) relative to the social-emotional risk–clarity–potential index (RCP).

=== Organizational talent management ===
For Elliot Jaques, human organizations are structured managerially according to levels of accountability. Each level of accountability entails a higher level of complexity in the work required of the role-holder, termed "size of role". Jaques defined the notion of requisite organization, where roles in an organization are hierarchically organized at specific levels of increasing complexity.

The application of CDF as an assessment methodology to measure the "size of person" in terms of their work capability and capacity provides a way forward for talent management systems to match the "size of person" to the "size of role". Progressively more complex roles require progressively higher levels of social–emotional development and cognitive development in the role-holder. In this way requisite organizations can align their human capability architecture with their managerial accountability architecture and design "growth assignments" that facilitate the development of capability for more complex roles.

=== Coaching ===
CDF provides a platform for professional coaching such as in leadership development and management development in a variety of ways. Firstly it provides assessment tools from which the coach can construct an integrated model of the coachee complete with the developmental challenges of the client who is to be helped. Secondly, and in the sense used by Edgar Schein the use of the assessment tools and the feedback of results by the coach is an act of "process consultation" by which the client may come to understand better the assumptions, values, attitudes and behaviors that are helping or hindering their success. Thirdly, CDF provides tools for deeper and more sophisticated thinking, thereby enabling the client to explore and expand their conceptual landscape of a problem.

CDF distinguishes between behavioral and developmental coaching. The goal of behavioral coaching is to improve the client's actual performance at work, described in CDF terms as their applied capability. In contrast, the goal of developmental coaching is to illuminate and develop the client's current and emergent capabilities for work in the context of their cognitive and social–emotional development.

=== Self-organization in teams ===
As shown in the book Dynamic Collaboration: Strengthening Self Organization and Collaborative Intelligence in Teams, by Jan De Visch and Otto Laske (2018), CDF can be a tool for building in organizations a dialogical culture by which distributed leadership in organizations can be realized.

== See also ==
- Model of hierarchical complexity
- Neo-Piagetian theories of cognitive development
- Positive adult development

== Literature ==
- Basseches, Michael: Dialectical thinking and adult development. Ablex Publishing, Norwood, NJ 1984, ISBN 0-89391-017-1.
- Bhaskar, Roy: Dialectic. The pulse of freedom. Verso, London & New York 1993, ISBN 0-86091-368-6.
- De Visch, Jan: The vertical dimension. 2010, ISBN 978-94-9069-538-5
- De Visch, Jan & Otto Laske (2018): Dynamic collaboration: Strengthening self-organization and collaborative intelligence in teams,(ISBN 97890-5325-443-1).
- Hager, August: Persönlichkeitsentwicklung wird messbar: verborgene Dimensionen menschlicher Arbeit entdecken und messen. In: Wirtschaftspsychologie, Nr. 1/2010, ISSN 1615-7729, pp17–23.
- Jaques, Elliott: Requisite organization: the CEO's guide to creative structure and leadership. Cason Hall, Arlington, VA 1989, ISBN 0-9621070-0-X.
- Jaques, Elliott: The life and behaviour of living organisms. A general theory. Praeger, London 2002, ISBN 0-275-97501-0.
- Kegan, Robert: In over our heads: the mental demands of modern life. Harvard University Press, Cambridge, MA 1994, ISBN 0-674-44588-0.
- Kegan, Robert: The evolving self: problem and process in human development. Harvard University Press, Cambridge, MA 1982, ISBN 0-674-27231-5.
- King, Patricia M. & Kitchener, Karen S.: Developing reflective judgment. Jossey-Bass, San Francisco, CA 1994, ISBN 978-1-555-42629-3.
- Lahey L, Souvaine E, Kegan R, Goodman R, Felix S: A guide to the subject-object interview: Its administration and interpretation. Minds at Work, Cambridge, MA 2011 ISBN 978-1461128809.
- Laske, Otto E. (2018), Interdevelopmental Institute Blogs, https://www.interdevelopmentals.org/?page_id=4831.
- Laske, Otto E: Dialectic as core discipline of integral epistemology: Establishing Bhaskar's MELD as the corner stone of professional thinking about human flourishing. Integral Journal of Theory and Practice, vol. 10 no. 2 (2016).
- Laske, Otto E.: How Roy Bhaskar extended and deepened the notion of cognitive adult development, Integral Leadership Review, Summer (2016).
- Laske, Otto E: Dialectical thinking for integral leaders: a primer. Integral Publishers, Tucson, AZ (2015), ISBN 978-0-9904419-9-1.
- Laske, Otto E. (Hrsg.): The Constructive Developmental Framework – Arbeitsfähigkeit und Erwachsenenentwicklung. Wirtschaftspsychologie, Nr. 1/2010, ISSN 1615-7729.
- Laske, Otto E.: À la découverte du potentiel humain: Les processus de développement naturel de l'adulte. Gloucester, MA: Interdevelopmental Institute Press 2012.
- Laske, Otto E.: Humanpotenziale erkennen, wecken und messen. Handbuch der entwicklungsorientierten Beratung. Bd. 1. Interdevelopmental Institute Press, Medford, MA 2010, ISBN 978-0-9826238-0-0.
- Laske, Otto E.: Measuring hidden dimensions. Foundations of requisite organization. Volume 2. Interdevelopmental Institute Press, Medford, MA 2009, ISBN 978-09776800-6-1.
- Laske, Otto E.: Measuring hidden dimensions. The art and science of fully engaging adults. Volume 1. Interdevelopmental Institute Press, Medford, MA 2006, ISBN 0-9776800-0-2.
- Laske, Otto E: Transformative effects of coaching on executives' professional agenda. PsyD dissertation. Bell & Howell Company, Boston, MI 1999.
- Ogilvie, Jean: Cognitive development: a new focus in working with leaders. In: Wirtschaftspsychologie, Nr. 1/2010, ISSN 1615-7729, pp70–75.
- Schweikert, Simone: CDF als Bildungswerkzeug für Menschen im Zeitalter der Wissensökonomie. In: Wirtschaftspsychologie, Nr. 1/2010, ISSN 1615-7729, pp90–95.
- Shannon, Nick: CDF: towards a decision science for organisational human resources? A practitioner's view. In: Wirtschaftspsychologie, Nr. 1/2010, ISSN 1615-7729, pp34–38.
- Stewart, John, John Stewart reviews Laske on dialectical thinking, Integral Leadership Review 8/31/2016.
