= Postformal thought =

Theory seeking to explain childhood mental development

Postformal thought is generally known as a stage in adult development where thought becomes complex, flexible, and when individuals are open to different perspectives outside of their own. This cognitive stage involves understanding that problems may have multiple, different solutions, and combining personal experiences with logic to make sense of the external world. It has been described as more flexible, logical, willing to accept moral and intellectual complexities, and dialectical than previous stages in development. Of postformal thought, Griffin and colleagues said, "one can conceive of multiple logics, choices, or perceptions ... in order to better understand the complexities and inherent biases in 'truth'". Jan Sinnott described postformal thought as the step beyond formal thought "by which individuals come to know the world outside themselves".

Developmental psychology initially focused on childhood development through Jean Piaget's four stages of human cognitive development, the last stage of which is known as the formal operational stage. Extending developmental psychology to adults, most neo-Piagetian theories of cognitive development have posited one or more stages of postformal thought. Postformal thought is also addressed by some non-Piagetian theories of developmental psychology, including Michael Commons' model of hierarchical complexity and Otto Laske's constructive developmental framework.

== Characteristics and operations of postformal thought ==
Sinnott has stated that there are two main characteristics of postformal thought:

1. Self-reference: There is some amount of subjectivity in all knowledge, thus all knowledge is somewhat incomplete. People are constantly urged to act, though they are always "trapped in partial subjectivity" due to the limits of their knowledge. This necessity to act means they must make decisions and they continue to act based on the logic they have chosen. Thus, the logic they use is self-referential to some degree.
2. Ordering of formal operations: As people decide what is true, logical processes develop out of these conclusions and progress and become more complex.

Sinnott also described key operations involved in postformal thought:

1. Metatheory shift: Moving from understanding the problem as an abstract to a practical one, for example. A major shift inspired by new ways of thinking philosophically or epistemologically.
2. Problem definition: Naming the problem.
3. Process–product shift: Developing some sort of process to make sense of looking at similar problems but not yet arriving at an answer unique to this problem.
4. Parameter setting: Describing limits to the future solution.
5. Pragmatism: Practically selecting one of several solutions.
6. Multiple solutions: Generating more than a single "correct" solution.
7. Multiple goals: Describing multiple points that would allow the problem to be "solved".
8. Multiple methods: Offering different ways to reach the same solution.
9. Multiple causality: Understanding and making sense of different causes involved in the problem.
10. Paradox: Understanding contradictions involved.
11. Self-referential thought: Understanding that the individual is the one selecting and judging a logic that will be used to create a solution.

== Philosophical foundations ==
Because postformal thought involves the evaluation of several "systems of truth", subjectivity is necessary. How people think about subjectivity can involve what Basseches called three styles of thought:

1. First, universalistic formal thinking holds the assumption that there are indeed a number of stable truths and that there is order in the universe. This order can be described formally and abstractly.
2. Second, relativistic thinking rejects that idea that there is a single universal order and instead posits that there can be multiple orders. Realities can differ amongst individuals or groups. Relativists deny that there is a "right way" and interpret formal thinking as a show of power or order on others' experiences. Relativists also resist evaluative language that would treat modes of being as "better" or "worse" than others, and rather push for appreciating, describing, and understanding all ways.
3. Finally, dialectical thinking plants itself in the middle of these two traditions. It assumes that the universe is dynamic and thus "the process of finding and creating order in the universe is viewed as fundamental to human life and inquiry." Dialectical thinking sets out to understand what is not known or understood about current ways of ordering and then works to create new orderings that are inclusive of what was unattended to previously. In this sense, dialectical thinkers show a tendency towards finding out what the best ordering of the universe could be in a current moment and are wary making claims about a presupposed order without critically evaluating many other perspectives and evidence.

Styles of thought are relevant to making sense of the subjectivity involved in postformal thought. Sinnott said that the subjectivity is multifaceted itself. Subjectivity is both relativistic and non-relativistic—relativistic in the sense that the individual can consider how truth systems may be logically equivalent, and also non-relativistic in the sense that the individual must ultimately make a practical choice between truth systems. Often this requires understanding which system and style of thought to employ depending on the context.

== Psychological foundations ==
Piaget's model was a developmental theory chiefly focused on understanding how reasoning works from young children through adolescents. Piaget proposed four linear stages: 1) the sensorimotor stage, 2) the preoperational transitional period, 3) the concrete operational stage, and 4) the formal operational stage. Sinnott posited that Piaget's original question around how reasoning—or what she called adaptive intelligence—could be extended to understand adults as well, and that "many mature adults do demonstrate a different quality of adaptive intelligence than do most children or most adolescents". Many in the field began to ask what could qualify as unique to the thinking processes of adults.

Arlin and Riegel described that adult intelligence is about problem finding, not just problem solving. By continually naming and describing new problems, people are able to enter into dialectical thinking. Sinnott extended this and found that a conceptualization of postformal thought must include an explanation of how interpersonal skills adapt as well, so her research explored how adults make sense of the complexities of interpersonal relations.

Before investigating postformal thought, Sinnott's research on adult performance in tasks associated with Piaget's concept of formal thought revealed that adults were struggling significantly with these challenges. Most notably, older adults—but not those with any cognitive, age-related impairments—still performed exceptionally poorly, with only 11% passing the formal operations exam she administered. Additional tests revealed that the "respondents were not 'failing' at all. They were essentially ignoring the simplistic old tasks and mental processes and going beyond them to an exciting new place! That new place seemed to combine cognitive processes with emotion, intention, and the needs of the person as a whole." In other words, adults were indeed thinking through a response to a problem but were not necessarily employing formal organized thinking, thus creating a false appearance that their thinking was illogical. Sinnott described this puzzle:

But most of my mature and older relatives were very bright, creative, practical, and yes, logical people. They invented things that were technologically sophisticated (for the times) and that later someone else would patent and successfully market. Some of them were wise. Many philosophized and narrated stories centered on their favorite themes. They told rich and complex stories of their lives. They had endless debated in which they built logical castles and defended them with ease. And they had friends who did the same—friends not so different from my talented research subjects who held professional jobs and advanced degrees and did logical things in the outside world. I was certain that my relatives were quite logical. But even with my "everyday" problems, I could not get my respondents to look logical on my potentially life-span Piagetian problem-solving test. They did poorly on Piaget's formal logic problems. What was going on here? What was I missing?

Sinnott later pointed to many paradigm shifts inspired by developments in physics that helped her conceptualize postformal operations as activities that "permit the adult thinker who continues his or her logical development to operate adaptively in a world of relative choices. They also permit the thinker to overcome the fragmentation and isolation inherent in trying to know the emotional, interpersonal, and spiritual aspects of the world through abstract, formal logic alone."

== Critical discussion and debate ==
The concept of postformal thought has been criticized by Marchand, Kallio and Kramer. They raised theoretical and empirical counter-arguments against the existence of a postformal stage. Instead, they proposed that adult development is a form of integrative thinking from within the formal stage, which includes most of the features claimed to be postformal such as understanding of various viewpoints, acceptance of contextualism, and integrating different viewpoints.

Some researchers have raised the question of whether postformal thinking has a "logical, temporal, or even statistical dependence on the achievement of formal thinking".

Kramer and Woodruff adopted the assumption that postformal thought was both relativistic and dialectical, and set out to empirically understand their relationship to formal thought. Their analyses demonstrated that formal operations were needed to engage in dialectics, but not sufficient alone. Moreover, being aware of relativity was also needed to engage in formal operations, but again not sufficient alone. They concluded that the nature of these two activities could increase as people age, but only dialectical thought could be considered postformal.

Reich and Ozer investigated the concept of complementarity, which they defined as the process of making sense of seemingly incompatible theories, such as objectivity and subjectivity or self and society. Their study concluded that formal reasoning is indeed a necessary foundation to practice this type of thinking, but that formal reasoning was insufficient alone.

== See also ==
- Double-loop learning – Learning model
- Higher-order thinking – Concept in education and education reform
- In Over Our Heads – Book on psychological development by Robert Kegan
- Integrative complexity – Research psychometric
- Integrative level – Set of phenomena emerging from pre-existing phenomena
- Structure of observed learning outcome – Model of levels of increasing complexity in understanding
