= Lord Brown =

Lord Brown or Lord Browne may refer to:

- Wilfred Brown, Baron Brown (1908–1985), author
- Wallace Browne, Baron Browne of Belmont (born 1947), Northern Irish politician
- Simon Brown, Baron Brown of Eaton-under-Heywood (1937–2023), British lawyer and justice of the Supreme Court
- John Browne, Baron Browne of Madingley (born 1948), British businessman
- Des Browne, Baron Browne of Ladyton (born 1952), British Labour Party politician

== See also ==
- Nick Browne-Wilkinson, Baron Browne-Wilkinson (born 1930)
- George Brown, Baron George-Brown (1914–1985), British Labour politician
- Mark Malloch Brown, Baron Malloch-Brown, British government minister
- Baroness Brown (disambiguation)
