= Daniel Levinson =

American psychologist

Daniel J. Levinson
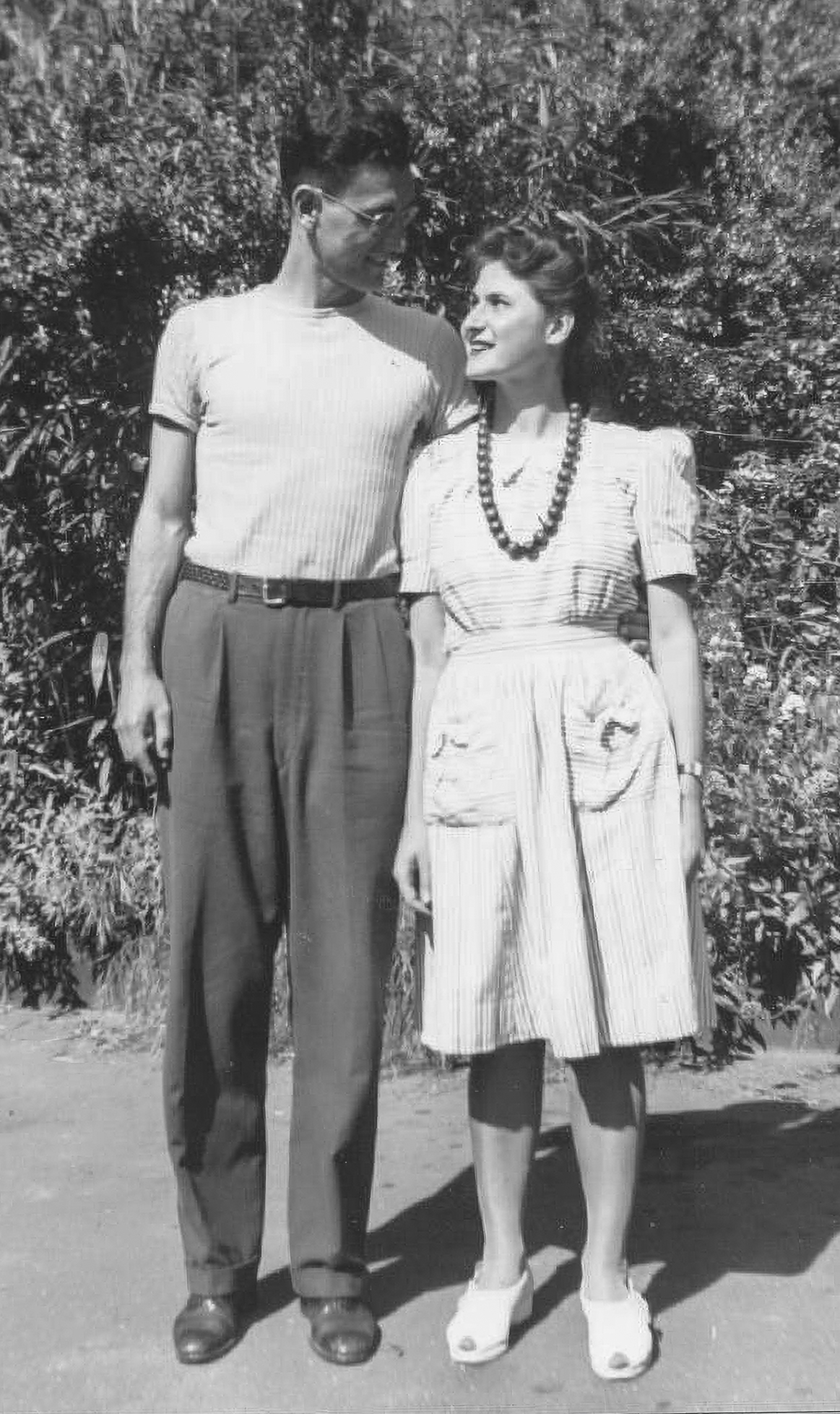
- Daniel J. Levinson
- Born: May 28, 1920; New York City
- Died: April 12, 1994 (aged 73); New Haven, Connecticut
- Occupation: Psychologist
- Known for: Positive adult development

Daniel J. Levinson (May 28, 1920 – April 12, 1994), a psychologist, was one of the founders of the field of positive adult development. Levinson is most well known for his theory of stage-crisis view, however he also made major contributions to the fields of behavioral, social, and developmental psychology. His interest in the social sciences began with studies on personality and authoritarianism, and eventually progressed to studies on development. Greatly influenced by the work of Erik Erikson, Elliott Jaques, and Bernice Neugarten, his stage-crisis view sought to incorporate all aspects of adult development in order to establish a more holistic approach to understanding the life cycle. In doing so, Levinson discussed the various developmental tasks and/or crises that one must address within each stage as well as how they contribute to the progression of development. Although much controversy surrounds his research methods, Levinson interviewed both men and women to uncover concrete patterns that occur within similar age ranges. Through these studies, he determined that men and women essentially progress through the same cycle of life, however they differentiate in what he refers to as "The Dream". He published his findings and theory within his two major books, The Seasons of a Man's Life and The Seasons of a Woman's Life; both of which remain as influential publications within the field of psychology. Being both simple in nature and open to further investigation, Daniel Levinson's legacy and lasting contributions are mainly to theory and entail profound implications for social as well as behavioral psychology.

== Professional life ==
Daniel Levinson was born on May 28, 1920, in New York City, New York. He began his studies of the social sciences at the University of California, Berkeley, whereat he completed his dissertation on ethnocentrism in 1947. Following this, he conducted research on personality, specifically authoritarian personalities at Berkeley and Western Reserve University. In 1950, Levinson shifted his career to Harvard University, and began to examine the interaction between personality and organizational settings. While at Harvard, Levinson worked with colleagues including Erik Erikson, Robert White, Talcott Parsons, Gordon Allport, and Alex Inkeles. Also during his 12 years at Harvard, Levinson published around 36 articles and books in a wide variety of topics, including personality and institutional policy, foreign policy, professional identity, mental health administration, and social change.

Levinson further advanced his academic career at Yale University from 1966 to 1990. During this time, Levinson shifted his research attention to adult development. Levinson worked with colleagues including Charlotte Darrow, Edward Klein, Maria Levinson (his wife with whom he had two children), and Braxton McKee while at Yale, and his research focused on interviewing 40 middle-aged men about their lives. Using the information gathered from these interviews, Levinson wrote the book The Seasons of a Man’s Life. Following this, he conducted a similar study for women, and wrote The Seasons of a Woman’s Life shortly before his death in New Haven, Connecticut, on April 12, 1994. Judy Levinson, his second wife, collaborated with Daniel Levinson on The Seasons of a Woman’s Life and she continued his work after his death.

== Research & Theory ==
=== Stage-crisis view ===
Levinson created his theory of stage-crisis view by conducting extensive interviews of men and women aged 35 to 45 and looking for common patterns throughout their lives. From his research, Levinson described specific stages of life from childhood to old age, each of which he suggested has a developmental task or crisis that needs to be resolved. Levinson believed that the pre-adulthood stage, early adulthood transition, early adulthood stage, midlife transition, middle adulthood stage, late adulthood transition, and late adulthood stage made up a person's life. Levinson also believed that the midlife crisis was a common and normal part of development. The stage-crisis theory has been criticized due to Levinson's research methods. Levinson studied men and women who were all in the same age group, making his results and conclusions subject to cohort effects.

=== Theory of men and women ===
Levinson believed that the main difference between men and women was “The Dream,” which refers to one’s vision for his or her future life, including goals and desires. Based on findings from his interviews with men and women, Levinson argued that men and women form different types of dreams for their lives: men typically dream about occupation, while women, who have more trouble forming their dreams, are torn between dreams of occupation and dreams of marriage and family.

=== Personality ===
Levinson’s studies on personality began with his first publication in 1950 entitled “The Authoritarian Personality,” which established a set of criteria whose purpose was to define personality types by ranking and rating various individual traits using the F-scale personality test. He continued to research personalities while at Berkeley, however when he arrived at Harvard he instead began to study the interaction between personality and organizations. In his 1959 publication entitled, “Role, personality, and social structure in the organizational setting,” Levinson sought to investigate the various roles within a social structure, their interaction with one another, and the extent to which they are influenced by and effect one's personality. He suggests that role definition is multifactorial and thereby based on both intrapersonal and environmental contexts. The intrapersonal factors that determine one’s definition and consequences of their role include their conception of the profession as well as their conception of self. Although important in establishing individualization, role definition cannot be complete without a conception of reality and the overall social structure. He goes on to state that neither aspect alone is enough to create a role definition; that in order to completely understand the nature of role definition, “we need the double perspective of personality and social structure.” Levinson continued his studies of personality interactions within social institutions throughout his years at Harvard, and simultaneously published many articles as well.

== Accomplishments ==
=== Major contributions ===
Levinson's two most prominent publications were his series of books entitled, The Seasons of a Man's Life (with Maria H. Levinson, Charlotte N. Darrow, Edward B. Klein and Braxton McKee) and The Seasons of a Woman's Life. Although controversy surrounds his publications, both books remain promising and highly influential within the field of psychology. His book, The Seasons of Man's Life contains his most well-known theory as well: the stage-crisis view. Throughout this theory, he encompasses a multidisciplinary approach which has allowed him to contribute greatly to the understanding of the entirety of life cycle. The Seasons of a Man's Life was the first to be published, whereby he continued follow-up studies on women and their development throughout the life cycle. Levinson died before completion, however his wife Judy Levinson continued his studies which were ultimately described in his second book of the series, The Seasons of a Woman's Life.

=== Publications ===
- Levinson, D. J., with Darrow, C. N, Klein, E. B. & Levinson, M. (1978). Seasons of a Man's Life. New York: Random House. ISBN 0-394-40694-X
- Levinson, D. J., with Levinson, J. D. (1996). Seasons of a Woman's Life. New York, NY: Alfred A. Knopf. ISBN 0-394-53235-X
- Levinson, D. J. (1986) A conception of adult development. American Psychologist, 4, pp. 3–13. doi: 10.1037/0003-066X.41.1.3.
- Levinson, D. J. (1959). Role, personality, and social structure in the organizational setting. The Journal of Abnormal and Social Psychology, 58, pp. 170–180.
- Levinson, D. J. (1977). The mid-life transition: A period in adult psychosocial development. Journal for the Study of Interpersonal Processes, 40, pp. 99–112.
- Adorno, T. W., Frenkel-Brunswik, E., Levinson, D. J., & Sanford, R. (1950). The Authoritarian Personality. Oxford, England: Harpers.

== Legacy ==
Daniel Levinson died on April 12, 1994, in New Haven, Connecticut. Throughout his lifetime, he conducted various studies by which he made lasting contributions to both the study of development and personality. Although most well known for his stage-crisis theory of development and life structure, his studies on personality and social structure entailed many implications for both behavioral and social psychology as well. While conducting his personality studies at Harvard, he received a National Institute of Mental Health Career Investor grant and 10 years later, upon leaving Harvard, he received a Career Development Award as well. Together these awards gave him an opportunity to continue his research at Yale, which ultimately led to his work on adult development. While his stage-crisis theory remains a controversial one, his book The Seasons of a Man’s Life endures as an important contribution to the understanding of the human life cycle. Due to his broad range of influence and simple ideas, Levinson’s legacy lies mainly in his theory.
