= Stage-crisis view =

Theory of adult development

Stage-crisis view is a theory of adult development that was established by Daniel Levinson. Although largely influenced by the work of Erik Erikson, Levinson sought to create a broader theory that would encompass all aspects of adult development as opposed to just the psychosocial. This theory is characterized by both definitive eras as well as transition phases, whose purpose is to facilitate a smooth transition out of one era and into the next. According to his theory, various developmental tasks must be mastered as one progresses through each era; pre-adulthood, early adulthood, middle adulthood, and late adulthood. Crises are also experienced throughout the lifecycle and occur when one become burdened by either internal or external factors, such as during the midlife crisis that occurs during the midlife transition from early adulthood to middle adulthood.

Levinson researched both men and women, and found that they typically go through the same cycles, though he suggested that women's cycles were more closely tied to the domestic sphere, or their family life. Due to the use of biased research methods however, the extent to which his results can be generalized remains controversial. Although not widely accepted, his theories entail many implications for both behavioral and cultural psychology.

== Stages of adult development ==
Within his theory, Daniel Levinson explains both the concept of adulthood itself as well as the stages by which development occurs. In order to do so effectively, he must differentiate between the life course and the life cycle. The life course, as he sees it, is the chronological process of living; from the beginning of life until the end. The life cycle on the other hand, is the common sequence of stages that every person undergoes during their life course. Although specific experiences may vary, the life cycle is common to all people and each person progresses through the same set of stages. Each stage, or era, is marked by specific changes and tasks that contribute the development of adulthood. A transition stage occurs when two eras overlap and assists in facilitating a smooth transition from one part of life to the next.

=== Pre-adulthood stage ===
This is the first stage that a person undergoes at the beginning of life and terminates at about age 22. Levinson refers to this era as the "formative years," by which a person undergoes unique experiences that assist in both development and the preparation for adulthood. The pre-adulthood stage entails the most rapid physical growth; as manifested by the initial change from infancy to childhood, followed by childhood to adolescence, and finally adolescence to adulthood in the later years. Individuals also become faced with the crisis of me vs. not me, by which an individual transitions from a state of dependence to a state of independence that is usually achieved around the age of 20. When life begins, infants rely on their mothers to simply survive, however as they mature they become less dependent on others and increasingly self-sustaining. This ongoing formation of independence not only aids in individualization but is also critical to survival because it ultimately prepares one for the onset and course of adulthood...

=== Early adulthood transition ===
This transition stage is characterized by an overlap of both the pre-adulthood stage and the early adulthood stage, and typically occurs around age 17-22. At this point, physical growth and development are complete and independence is fairly well established. Individualization is becoming more prominent because one is now better suited to make decisions in preparation for their future. An important concept relating to this era is the modification of relationships; by which a person increasingly distances themselves from their family in order to solidify their transition into adulthood. It is in this period that a person would be considered a mature adult although developmental psychology views this as only the starting point for actual adulthood. Upon termination of the transition stage, maturity is established and one is fully prepared to enter the adult world.

=== Early adulthood stage ===
This era begins at around age 17 and lasts until about age 45, thus including the early adulthood transition. The 20s and 30s are typically a period of great pleasure, as many new experiences, relationships and aspirations are being pursued. People begin to set and obtain goals for their future as well as make critical life decisions; such as those involving an occupation, love and family. Although both exciting and central to adulthood, these decisions can often be very stressful. The introduction of children adds complexity to a marriage and increases financial demands, thus increasing occupational stress as well. Towards the end of the era, those who had children early may be experiencing the stresses associated with their children entering adulthood and the resulting relationship changes that coincide. Some may also be taking on the added responsibility of caring for their elderly parents. Overall, the early adulthood era is characterized by a great deal of both rewards and costs.

=== Midlife transition ===
Occurring around age 40-45 and thus encompassing part of both early adulthood and middle adulthood, this era is critical to development and very controversial. Levinson believed that the character of living changes greatly between the two stages: beginning during early adulthood and progressing at various degrees throughout the transition and into middle adulthood. Due to the drastic life changes one undergoes within the middle adulthood transition, one often faces a crisis period. Levinson used the term "midlife crisis" only to describe the crisis that one undergoes during the Midlife Transition, rather than crises found in other developmental periods. The midlife crisis is a period in development that supposedly happens in middle age, and is characterized by making sudden and large changes, experiencing anxiety, and reevaluating oneself and one's choices. According to Levinson, the midlife crisis echoes the three developmental tasks within the midlife transition: ending the stage of early adulthood, initiating middle adulthood, and coping with sources of discord in one's life. Other developmental tasks that are addressed within this stage include becoming more individualized and constructive as opposed to attached to social constraints and destructive. Levinson believed that during this transition, one must develop compassion, acceptance and love otherwise they will become burdened by both internal and external conflict. This is especially important when dealing with the stresses associated with the onset of leaving the youthful years and entering middle-age.

=== Middle adulthood stage ===
Levinson believed that by the mid-forties, it is generally established that one is a full generation ahead of the younger adults, thus formally encompassing them in the "middle-aged" society. Unlike the previous stages however, Levinson believed that the onset and duration of the following eras are determined by significant events such as retirement, disease states, and various physical changes. Levinson believed that a person should be finished with their midlife transition tasks around age 45, at which point new developmental tasks arise. Levinson argued that the difference between the midlife transition and the middle adulthood stage can be seen in small changes, including changed family relationships and changes in work life that may make work seem either oppressive or satisfying. According to Levinson's research, there are distinct periods in middle adulthood, including the Age Fifty Transition, occurring from age 50 to 55. Levinson describes this period as when a person can continue to work on the tasks from their midlife transition and amend the life structure that they built in their forties. A crisis can occur in this stage for those who did not change enough during their midlife transition and have a dissatisfying life structure. Next, from roughly age 55 to 60, a person's task is to build what Levinson called a "second middle adult structure", which allows a person to complete middle adulthood. This stable period of time is intended to be fulfilling, since it can be spent rejuvenating and enhancing oneself and one's life. Toward the end middle adulthood however, physical and mental changes become more prominent, as does the reality of retirement. Although experienced at different times and to various extents, these events trigger the reality that one is entering old age and thus becoming a senior member.

=== Late adulthood transition ===
Levinson defines the late adulthood transition as when middle adulthood is coming to an end and late adulthood begins, from about age 60 to 65. Around age 60, a person experiences a physical or bodily decline, and notices the higher frequency of friends, family members, and peers dying or experiencing illness, which reminds the person that they are moving from middle age to old age and declining in health and capabilities. Levinson also asserts that every man is presented with the reduction of middle adult powers during this transition stage. The main crisis in the Late Adulthood Transition is a person fears that their inner youthfulness is disappearing, and only an old, fatigued, boring person will remain, leaving a person in this period with the task of keeping their youthfulness in a way that is suitable for late adulthood. The Late Adulthood Transition is also said to be traumatic because it is a time when a person receives less recognition for their work, has less authority and influence, and is no longer dominant.

=== Late adulthood stage ===
According to Levinson, late adulthood lasts from age 60 to age 85. This developmental period is characterized by giving up one's formal authority or power, specifically in the workplace. If a person does not end their power in the workplace, they risk being disconnected with their own generation, and in conflict with the generation in middle adulthood. After retiring, a person is supposed to take part in valued work that comes from their own creativity, leading into the developmental task of striking a balance between involvement with society and with oneself. Levinson suggested that through harnessing one's own inner resources and interests in an unselfish way, one can gain more wisdom about the external world. Levinson believed that the main task in the late adulthood stage is to reflect on one's life, including their times of success and failure, and appreciate the rest of their life experiences.

=== Life structure ===
Levinson's proposal of adult development stemmed primarily from previous concepts such as the life cycle. Levinson had a focus on the specific points of someone's life and how it changed over time. Levinson believe key aspects of a particulars person's life should be put into perspective through the context of said person's life. The life structure aimed to answer personal questions about one's life and consists of relationships with the external. The life structure requires inquiries into the multiple possible relationships throughout one's life as well as their nature. The life structure forms a barrier between the personality and social structures, although the life structure also works to connect the two as well requiring the connection of the social and psychological sciences.

== History of concept of adult development ==
The idea that people develop through adulthood was first explored by G. Stanley Hall, who examined adult development and aging and published the book "Senescence: The Last Half of Life", in 1922. Through Hall's research and theorizing on adulthood and old age, he developed the view that aging involved creativity and reviving oneself mentally and emotionally rather than physical and cognitive deterioration.

In addition to Hall's work on adult development, Levinson was also influenced by Erik Erikson, who is well known for theory on the stages of psychosocial development. Erikson was one of the pioneers in adult development, as his theory included stages for adulthood, while other theories, such as Jean Piaget's theory of cognitive development, did not extend past adolescence. Erikson's theory has three stages that he found occurring in early, middle, and late adulthood. These stages revolve around intimacy versus isolation, generativity versus stagnation, and ego integrity versus despair.

== Experimental evidence & limitations ==
There has been some controversy regarding the generalizability of Levinson's findings to the public as a whole. Much of Levinson's research relied on individual interviews with people who were not representative of a diverse population, which could lead to effects that do not apply to many different types of people. For example, in examining the midlife crisis stage, Levinson studied 40 men who were in the same age cohort, meaning they were all middle-aged. Further, Levinson's data was analyzed by middle-aged men, as well. This means that there is a confound within Levinson's study, and his conclusions about the existence of a midlife crisis as a normal stage in life may not be correct. Much of the original research suggesting that the midlife crisis is a normal part of life is confounded and anecdotal, has not been replicated, and was not longitudinal.

Another experimental limitation of Levinson's research came from his interview methods. By using interviews to gather information about subjects, Levinson did not manipulate or control for any variables, which makes it difficult to draw definitive conclusions about the validity of his findings. Further, Levinson conducted his research in the 1970s and 1980s, a time in which second-wave feminism was in full swing and women were revolutionizing their roles at home and in the workplace. It is possible that the women he studied during this time may have differed somehow from women in modern times, and therefore his findings may not generalize to life stages of current women.

== Receptions & implications of theory ==
Although thorough in its encompassment of many aspects of adult development, Levinson's theory has remained a controversial subject since publication. Due to content itself as well as the coinciding limitations, whether his theory is generalizable to all adult development has remained a lingering question. Levinson states that some eras occur without substantial life alterations due to external events and are thereby not marked by "rites of passage". This has sparked controversy because "rites of passage" are not definitive; they are determined by each society and based on what each determines to be significant. These differentiations result in eras that may or may not incorporate substantial life alterations, thereby disproving absolute generalizability of Levinson's theory. It does, however, entail many implications for cultural psychology including studies of various societal "rites of passage" and their effect on development.

As a result of Levinson's theory, interactions between individuals in different eras has become another area of study which entails many implications for behavioral psychology. For instance, during counseling or therapy, someone from a later era may become a mentor to someone from a younger era. Through studying these relationships, it has been found that both the mentor and the mentee benefit, however in different ways and to various extents. The ways in which people interact with one another is a constantly developing area of study with great implications for counseling, therapy, and psychopathology.
