= Baroness Brown =

Baroness Brown may refer to:

- Julia King, Baroness Brown of Cambridge (born 1954), British engineer
- Lyn Brown, Baroness Brown of Silvertown (born 1960), British Labour Party politician

== See also ==
- Lord Brown (disambiguation)
