= European Society for Research in Adult Development =

European research organization

The membership of the European Society for Research in Adult Development (ESRAD) includes people from all disciplines who are interested in positive adult development. Positive adult development refers to development starting in late adolescence and continuing through to the end of life. The focus is on expanded capabilities and changes that improve the quality of life. Research and discussion within the field of Positive Adult Development include the topics of wisdom, cognitive development. and moral development, psychotherapy, adult education, political development, societal and spiritual development. Both empirical and theoretical research are encouraged. ESRAD was connected to the earlier Society for Research in Adult Development (SRAD).

Society was found in Lund 2011 in Sweden, and after that annual symposiums have been held (2012 Coimbra, Portugal; 2013 Freiburg-im-Breisgau, Germany; 2014 Helsinki, Finland; 2016 The Hague, Holland; 2018 London, U.K.). Dr. Oliver Robinson act as president from 2016- onwards, and Dr. Rebecca Hamer as vice-president.
