= Elliott Jaques =

Canadian psychoanalyst and organizational psychologist (1917–2003)

- Born: 18 January 1917; Toronto, Ontario, Canada
- Died: 8 March 2003 (aged 86); Gloucester, Massachusetts, United States
- Known for: Requisite organization Coining the term 'Midlife crisis' Time Span of Discretion
- Spouse: Kay Walsh (m. 1953; div. 1956)

Elliott Jaques (January 18, 1917 – March 8, 2003) was a Canadian psychoanalyst, social scientist and management consultant known as the originator of concepts such as corporate culture, midlife crisis, fair pay, maturation curves, time span of discretion (level of work) and requisite organization, as a total system of managerial organization.

== Biography ==
Born in Toronto, Ontario, Jaques was educated at the University of Toronto and studied medicine at Johns Hopkins University, then received his Ph.D. in social relations from Harvard University, and qualification as psychoanalyst at the British Psychoanalytical Society. He was a founding fellow of the Royal College of Psychiatrists in Britain and was a visiting professor at George Washington University in Washington, D.C., and honorary professor of the University of Buenos Aires.

During the Second World War, Jaques served as a major in the Canadian Army where, in collaboration with Henry Murray of Harvard University, he established the Canadian War Office Selection Boards. He was assigned as liaison to the British Army War Office Psychiatry Division that developed their own War Office Selection Boards.

In 1949, he married the English actress Kay Walsh. They adopted a girl, Gemma. They divorced in 1956.

After the war Jaques remained in England and qualified under Austrian-British psychoanalyst Melanie Klein. She appreciated his help in preparation for the publication of her book Narrative of a Child Analysis (1961). Jaques also helped Klein to edit the manuscript of Envy and Gratitude (1957), evidence suggests that it was Jaques who suggested that the word "gratitude" should be included in the title of the book. He was a founding member of the Tavistock Institute of Human Relations in 1946. In 1964, he founded the School of Social Sciences at Brunel University of London, and served as its Professor and Head of School.

Jaques moved from London to Gloucester, Massachusetts in 1991, and became a research professor at George Washington University. In 1999 Jaques established Requisite Organization International Institute, that operates as an educational and research group.

As a result of his work with different corporations, governments and U.S. Army, Jaques developed a scientific process that allows for the evaluation of the potential capability of individuals in the context of time-span of discretion, an instrument which measures work complexity in each role within the organisation. This approach has been used by US armed services and large public and private organisations around the world.

In 1965 Jaques published an essay on working patterns of creative geniuses in which he coined the phrase midlife crisis.

His development approach to organizational development makes him one of the early contributors to positive adult development.

He died in Gloucester, Massachusetts in 2003.

== Work ==
=== Glacier Project, 1952–1977 ===
The origins of Jaques's theories can be traced back to 1952, when Britain's Glacier Metal Company asked him to help to develop a worker participation plan. At one point, Jaques was asked if there was any importance to the fact that the salary of low-level workers was estimated on hourly, daily or weekly basis, while salary of executives was described as annual amount. The question 'was the finest gift I've ever been given', Jaques said. 'It was absolutely, bloody brilliant. That's when I started examining the significance of time.' His work with Glacier Metal Company in London continued through 1977 and largely influenced the management theory. Peter Drucker called this work "the most extensive study of actual worker behavior in large-scale industry".

=== Stratified Systems Theory of Requisite Organization, 1977–1999 ===
Jaques incorporated his findings during "Glacier investigations" into what was first known as Stratified Systems Theory of requisite organization. This major discovery served as a link between social theory and theory of organizations.

==== Human Capability and Its Maturation ====
Jaques continued his development of theory of underlying Nature of Human Capability, that he first approached during his work with the US Army and this resulted in the discovery (with Kathryn Cason) of a method for evaluation of potential individual capability within the evaluation of Complexity of Information Processing.

As a result of the research carried out for the US Army Research Institute for the Behavioral and Social Sciences and American and Australian companies on the study of mental complexity, it was found that individuals process information at work in four ways: declarative, cumulative, serial and parallel. This study demonstrated the interdependence of layers of the managerial hierarchy and each separate step in mental processing complexity.

From this work it was concluded that organizational life of intermittent steps in the nature of human capability reflects the essence of managerial hierarchical structure (Jaques, 1994).

==== Time-Span of Discretion ====
As an outcome of the discovery and use of Time-span, work on Theory of the Nature of Time took place. This led to another major contribution of Dr.Jaques, the development of the Time-span of Discretion instrument, the ratio-scale measure for a construct in the social sciences, which measures the complexity of work in each role within the organization. The measure of how much responsibility an employee has is the concept Jaques is widely known for.

=== Requisite Organization International Institute, 1999–present ===
In 1999, The Requisite Organization International Institute was established by Co-founders Elliott Jaques and Kathryn Cason. Institute operates as research and educational centre providing support and consulting in implementation of principles of Requisite Organization worldwide.

Jaques' ideas are still very influential in a practical study of organizations and the optimization of structures and systems that support productive work for the achievement of the organization's purpose. Jaques argued that the higher a person was positioned in a hierarchy, assuming the individual possessed a corresponding level of cognitive complexity, acquired skills and knowledge (gained through experience) and presuming that individual valued the work he or she was tasked, the longer he could work to complete a task without supervision. The time span of a CEO of a major institution might be 15–20 years. This concept enabled him to describe a "requisite organization" as one in which each level in the hierarchy had its own distinctive time span. If an organization had too many levels, then their time spans overlapped. If a manager at a higher level was ill-equipped in respect of his or her inherent mental processing capability, or lacked the required skills and knowledge the risk is they would interfere in the work of managers at a lower level generally propelled by their own anxiety and insecurity. The process of delegation would be undermined leading to organizational dysfunction.

With an understanding of mental processing capability and a hierarchy that supports the proficiency of work in the organization Jaques provided some insight into effective managerial practices that are aimed at freeing up the human potential in the organization. For example, Jaques advocates the importance of effectively assigning tasks to individuals in the organization delivered by contextualizing the significance of the task(s) to the organization's purpose in terms of output including clear deliverables in respect of quantity and quality and the time for delivery. Moreover, a manager has an obligation to provide coaching to his or her subordinates, and the manager is in fact accountable for his or her subordinates' outputs.

== Selected awards ==
- Awarded the Joint Staff Certificate of Appreciation by General Colin Powell on behalf of the Joint Chiefs of Staff of the U.S. Armed Forces "for outstanding contributions in the field of military leadership theory and instruction to all of the service departments of the United States".
- Department of the Army, Office of the Deputy Chief of Staff for Personnel "for outstanding achievement while serving as a member of the Total Army Personnel Task Force in...developing new and innovative approaches to achieve personnel economies and realign...along policy and operational lines."
- Harry Levinson Award, American Psychological Foundation, Certificate of Commendation, for a lifetime of scientific contributions.

== Publications ==
- The Changing Culture of a Factory: A Study of Authority and Participation in an Industrial Setting (London: Tavistock, 1951)
- Measurement of Responsibility: A study of work, payment, and individual capacity (Tavistock, 1956) [Reprinted as ISBN 0-415-26443-X]
- Equitable Payment: A General Theory of Work, Differential Payment, and Individual Progress (London: Heinemann, 1961)
- Equitable Payment (London: Heinemann, 1963)
- Time-Span Handbook: the Use of Time-Span of Discretion to Measure the Level of Work in Employment Roles and to Arrange an Equitable Payment Structure (London, Heinemann, 1964)
- Product Analysis Pricing: A method for setting policies for the delegation of pricing decisions and the control of expense and profitability (Carbondale, Southern Illinois University Press, 1964) [with Wilfred Brown ]
- Glacier Project Papers (London: Heinemann Educational, 1965) [with Wilfred Brown ] ISBN 0-435-85102-0
- "Death and the Midlife Crisis", International Journal of Psychoanalysis, 1965.
- Progression Handbook: How to Use Earnings Progression Data Sheets for Assessing Individual Capacity, for Progression, and for Manpower Planning and Development (London: Heinemann, 1967)
- Work, creativity, and social justice (London: Heinemann Educational, 1970) ISBN 0-435-85479-8
- A General Theory of Bureaucracy (London: Heinemann Educational, 1976) ISBN 0-435-82473-2
- Health Services (London: Heinemann Educational, 1978) ISBN 0-435-82474-0
- Levels of Abstraction in Logic and Human Action: A theory of discontinuity in the structure of mathematical logic, psychological behaviour, and social organisation. (London: Heinemann Educational, 1978) with R.O. Gibson and D.J. Isaac [Editors]
- Executive Leadership: A Practical Guide to Managing Complexity (Oxford: Blackwell Publishing, 1994) ISBN 0-631-19313-8 [with Stephen D. Clement and Ronnie Lessem]
- Human Capability: Study of Individual Potential and Its Application (London: Gower, 1994) ISBN 0-566-07652-7 [with Kathryn Cason]
- Requisite Organization: Total System for Effective Managerial Organization and Managerial Leadership for the 21st Century (London: Gower, 1997) ISBN 0-566-07940-2
- La Organizacion Requerida: Un Sistema Integrado Para Crear Organizaciones Eficaces y Aplicar el Liderazgo Gerencial en el Siglo XXI (Ediciones Granica, S.A., 2000) ISBN 950-641-303-7
- Social Power and the CEO: Leadership and Trust in a Sustainable Free Enterprise System (Greenwood, 2002) ISBN 1-56720-551-8
- The Life and Behavior of Living Organisms: A General Theory (Greenwood, 2002) ISBN 0-275-97501-0
