= Wilfred Brown, Baron Brown =

The Right Honourable The Lord Brown MBE PC

Minister of State for Trade
- In office 11 October 1965 – 19 June 1970
- Monarch: Elizabeth II
- Prime Minister: Harold Wilson
- Preceded by: Edward Redhead
- Succeeded by: Frederick Corfield

Member of the House of Lords Lord Temporal
- In office 22 December 1964 – 7 March 1985; Life peerage

Personal details
- Born: Wilfred Banks Duncan Brown; 29 November 1908 Greenock, Scotland
- Died: 7 March 1985 (aged 76) London, UK
- Party: Labour
- Other political affiliations: Common Wealth Party
- Spouse: Lady Marjorie Hershall Skinner
- Children: Hon. Richard Brown, Hon. Michael Brown and Hon. Angus Brown
- Occupation: Manager, author, university administrator
- Writing career
- Citizenship: UK
- Period: 20th century
- Genre: Management
- Subject: Organization
- Notable works: Organization and Glacier Project Papers
- Notable awards: Honorary DTech (Brunel, 1966); (honorary) Doctor of Laws (Southern Illinois University, 1967) and (honorary) DSc (Cranfield, 1972)

Wilfred Banks Duncan Brown, Baron Brown PC MBE (29 November 1908 – 7 March 1985), was the chairman and the managing director of Glacier Metal Company (1939–1965), author of several books and articles on management and labour issues, university administrator, and United Kingdom's Minister of State for Trade (1965–1970).

Brown is perhaps best known for his collaboration with the organizational theorist Elliott Jaques on the Glacier Project, which Peter Drucker called "the most extensive study of actual worker behavior in large-scale industry". Sponsored by Glacier Metal Company and its Works Council during Brown's leadership, the project ran from 1948 to 1965, resulting in the development or discovery of felt-fair pay, stratified systems theory, timespan of discretion, levels of work, product pricing analysis and career progression trajectories. These ideas were described in the various books and articles written by Brown and Jaques. (See Bibliography.) Brown later attempted to use these processes in governmental affairs as a member of the House of Lords.

An advocate of practical learning for managers, Brown created the Glacier Institute of Management. He served as the first Chairman of Acton Technical College's Governing Body, Chairman of Brunel University from 1949 to 1965, and Pro-Chancellor of Brunel from 1965 to 1980. Although he never attended university, Brown received honorary degrees from Brunel University (DTech, 1966), Southern Illinois University (Doctor of Laws, 1967) and Cranfield University (DSc, 1972).

He was appointed a Member of the Order of the British Empire (MBE) in the 1943 Birthday Honours and made a life peer as Baron Brown, of Machrihanish, in the County of Argyll, on 22 December 1964.

== Bibliography (selected) ==
- Bate, John; Hollingan, Philip Terence; and Brown, Wilfred Banks Duncan. (1944) "Patent: CA 422903: Metal bonding method / Methode a lier des metaux". Canadian Intellectual Property Office. http://patents.ic.gc.ca/cipo/cpd/en/patent/422903/summary.html. Accessed 2008-06-01.
- Brown, Wilfred. (1945) "Incentives Within the Factory". Occupational Psychology. 19(2):82–92.
- Brown, Wilfred; and Raphael, Winifred. (1948) Managers, Men and Morale. London: Macdonald and Evans.
- Brown, Wilfred. (1956) "Can There Be Industrial Democracy?" . Fabian Journal. 18(March):14–22.
- Brown, Wilfred. (1960) Exploration In Management. London: Heinemann Educational Books.
- Brown, Wilfred. (1962) Piecework Abandoned – The Effect of Wage Incentive Systems on Managerial Authority. London: Heinemann Educational Books.
- Brown, Wilfred. (1962) “What Is Work?” Harvard Business Review. 40(5):121–129.
- Brown, Wilfred. (1963) “A Critique of Some Current Ideas About Organization”. California Management Review. 6(1):3–12.
- Brown, Wilfred. (1964) “Judging the Performance of Subordinates.” Management International. 4(2):3–13.
- Jaques, Elliott and Brown, Wilfred. (1964) Product Analysis Pricing, a method for setting policies for the delegation of pricing decisions and the control of expense and profitability. Carbondale, IL: Southern Illinois University Press.
- Brown, Wilfred; and Jaques, Elliott. (1965) Glacier Project Papers. London: Heinemann.
- Brown, Wilfred. (1971) Organization. London: Heinemann Educational Books.
- Brown, Wilfred. (1973) The Earnings Conflict – proposals for tackling the emerging crisis of industrial relations, unemployment, and wage inflation. New York: John Wiley & Sons.
- Brown, Lord Wilfred. (1975) Participation. Bradford, UK: MCB Books.
- Brown, Wilfred; and Hirsch-Weber, Wolfgang. (1983) Bismarck to Bullock: Conversations about institutions in politics and industry in Britain and Germany. London: Anglo-German Foundation for the Study of Industrial Society.
