= Positive adult development =

Subfield of developmental psychology

Positive adult development is a subfield of developmental psychology that studies positive development during adulthood. It is one of four major forms of adult developmental study that can be identified, according to Michael Commons; the other three forms are directionless change, stasis, and decline. Commons also further divided the concept of positive adult development into six distinct areas of study: hierarchical complexity (i.e., orders or stages), knowledge, experience, expertise, wisdom, and spirituality.

The development of people has focused on children and adolescence with several theories as proposed by Freud, Piaget, and Binet. Research in positive adult development supports the theory that development occurs during adulthood. Recent studies indicate that such development is useful in predicting things such as an individual's health, life satisfaction, and degree of contribution to society. Current research supports the idea that personal adjustment and personal growth are two main themes in positive adult development research. Personal adjustment refers to how well an individual can master and adapt to their environment, while personal growth refers to having the ability to have deep insight into oneself, others, and the world around them. One other benefit is allowing for changes in social policies to create effective, efficient interventions to help optimize the aging process to as many of our aging generation as possible. In these studies, adults that were older rated higher than these categories then those that were younger, thus supporting that there is indeed a positive development that occurs in adulthood.

== Development of the field ==
=== Origins of the field ===
This field stems from several work threads within psychology. Erik Erikson proposed several adult periods. Daniel Levinson also described many "seasons of life." Abraham Maslow proposed an adult hierarchy of needs and Jean Piaget came to agree there was adult postformal stages beyond the stage of formal operations. His earlier theory had located an endpoint to the development of cognitive structures, wherein concluded the Adolescence or adolescent's acquisition of formal operations. John L. Horn found that crystallized intelligence, represented by vocabulary size, increased in adulthood. Robert Kegan combined a Piagetian and an existential-phenomenological approach to creating what he called constructive-developmental psychology. Lawrence Kohlberg found that in early adulthood, some people come to think of moral, ethical, and societal issues in multivariate terms (Systematic stage 11, the first postformal stage). They use multiple relations. During middle adulthood some become principled reasoners about moral issues; for instance, by using abstract principles to relate systems of rights to systems of duties (Meta systematic stage 12, the second postformal stage). Likewise, Cheryl Armon found that by middle adulthood, some people could reason about interpersonal relationships at an order of complexity similar to that described by Lawrence Kohlberg.

Research on positive adult development has grown and expanded upon these early threads and theories in a number of directions. Summaries of some of the initial positive adult development research can be found in the works of Commons, Richards, and Armon, as well as in Alexander and Langer. Four postformal adult stages of development beyond the formal stage have been discovered in a wide variety of domains. The total number of stages across the lifespan now stands at 15. Periods and Seasons have been described. (Note: For critical discussion of the term "postformal thinking", see Kallio. She claims that the highest forms of adult cognitive development (as part of adult positive development) can be called "integrative thinking" (i.e. integrating several different psychological domains as emotions, cognition etc.))

Many edited books were written on the topic of positive adult development in the 1990s (Note: Edited books written in the 1990s include: Commons, M.L.; Richards, F.A.; Armon, C., eds. (1984). Beyond formal operations: Vol. I. Late adolescent and adult cognitive development. New York: Praeger. ISBN 978-0-03-062559-6.; Commons, M. L., Armon, C., Kohlberg, L., Richards, F. A., Grotzer, T. A., & Sinnott, J. D. (Eds.). (1990). Adult development: Vol. 2. Models and methods in studying adolescent and adult thought. New York: Praeger.) and more recently. (Note: Edited books written in the 2000s include: Demick, J., & Andreoletti (Eds.).(2003). Handbook of adult development. New Jersey, Mahwah: Lawrence Erlbaum Associates.; Hoare, C. (Ed.). (2006). Handbook of adult development and learning. New York, NY: Oxford University Press.) In the past decade, researchers have turned to investigating methods to foster positive development in educational as well as organizational settings, rather than by just describing it and/or measuring it. These methods are used in organizational and educational settings. Some use developmentally designed, structured public discourse to address complex public issues. Some of these methods include developing relationships, participating in skill-building opportunities, having educational and career support, participating in civic and social activities, and providing for individual needs. Developmental relationships provide opportunities to support and encourage people in surrounding areas. Participating in skill-building opportunities can promote skill growth and autonomy while providing competence and belonging. Having educational and career support helps individuals form meaningful connections. Participating in civic and social activities encourages involvement in community roles which fosters personal growth. Providing for individual needs provides support for life changes. Methods used to foster positive adult development should focus on letting individuals reach milestones in supportive environments.

== Directions of change in positive adult development ==
To determine whether a particular development in adulthood is positive or not, a value judgment must be made about what kind of change in adult life is optimal or beneficial, and correspondingly what changes in adulthood are harmful. There are several competing standards for what constitutes positive development in adulthood, which can be broadly grouped into five directions; orthogenetic(becoming more hierarchically complex), selective/adaptive (becoming more likely to pass on your genes and for offspring to survive and thrive in an environment that is not ideal), veridical (becoming less biased in your view of the world), eudemonic (becoming happier and healthier), and virtuous (becoming a better person from a particular moral or ethical standpoint).

Studies have been conducted on various components of adult development. One such focus is on the relationship between life experiences and optimism. The relationship between the two is multifaceted. Significant life events can trigger changes in optimism even if there is moderate stability over time. People show resilience by keeping this optimism even through changes and challenges. Although, both positive and negative life events do lead to optimistic fluctuations. The study (Abraham, 2007) supports many personality development theories that similarly show that optimism fluctuates throughout many of life's situations.

Another study (Helson, 2001), presented three positive "paths" a third followed the effects of attitudes of caring for others, which starts in adolescence and then continues into adulthood. Each of the adult individuals follows a path through adult development. These three paths were created using Environmental Mastery (EM) and Personal Growth (PG) scales developed by Carol D. Ryff. The three paths, identified as "Achievers", "Conservers", and "Seekers", were formulated from the patterns that resulted when Ryff's EM and PG tests were administered in the study. The Achievers scored high on both scales. The Conservers scored high on EM and low on PG. The Seekers scored low on EM and high on PG. All three paths were unique but all equally positive. This distinction was concluded to be the result of individual skill and motivation, with each individual's personal action creating personal strengths and personality features. The attributes of emotionality (both positive and negative), processes of identity, and the alterations in self-control across the adulthood years predicted the path classifications. Additionally, each path consisted of a strength profile on the "four criteria of maturity", being competence, generativity, ego development, and wisdom.

== Measurements in positive adult development ==
Assessment of positive adult development can measure quantitative (something that can be counted or measured) or qualitative (things described and cannot be measured in a numerical fashion) change. Measurements of quantitative change assess change on a defined continuous variable, these variables would include such measures as IQ, reaction time, or indicators of personal maturity, authenticity or self-actualization. Quantitative change can be discontinuous if a sudden step-change is in value, or continuous when changes occur gradually and incrementally.

Qualitative change is evidenced by a change in kind, rather than a change in amount, as exemplified by the switch from caterpillar to butterfly. Assessments of qualitative change in adulthood involve assigning written or numerical data to a stage within a defined stage model, according to defined assessment criteria. Researchers have developed a number of such instruments and methods to measure adult development stages, such as themoral judgment interview of Kohlberg, the Berlin Wisdom Interview, the Washington University Sentence Completion Test, the Subject-Object Interview, and the model of hierarchical complexity.

Positive adult development can be measured in multiple domains, including physical health through diet reports, BMI, exercise logs, noticeable and avoidance of risk-taking behaviors. Psychological and emotional well-being can be measured through Satisfaction With Life Scale [SWLS], Life Orientation Test-Revised [LOT-R], reports of positive emotion, and resilience measures. Further development of life skills can be measured through increased self-efficacy, and interpersonal skills, improved decision-making and problem-solving. Other areas of measurement include: ethical behavior- matters such as personal morals, behavioral checklists, and ethical reasoning; healthy relationships- aspects like relationship quality, satisfaction analyses, supportive interactions, and conflict resolution skills; educational attainment- details such as academic records, graduation rates, and levels of certification; occupational engagement-segments regarding career advancement and tracking, employment history, and skill-building; and lastly, civic engagement-channels of volunteering, civic behavior rankings, and community involvement.These can be measured by behavioral observations, developmental milestones, and self-reporting. It is also important to take into consideration the context and culture in which these measurements are taken to ensure accuracy and relevance.

== See also ==
- Adult development
