= Idios kosmos =

Creators

Idios kosmos (from Ancient Greek: ἴδιος κόσμος) is people's "own world" or "private world" as distinguished from the "common world" (koinos kosmos). The origin of the term is attributed to fragment B89 (Diels–Kranz numbering) of the pre-Socratic philosopher Heraclitus: "The waking have one common world, but the sleeping turn aside each into a world of his own." The term has various interpretations: idios kosmos is associated with dreaming, imagination, and delusion; koinos kosmos with wakefulness, reason, and consensus reality.

From the 1950s, the term was adopted by phenomenological/existential psychologists, such as Ludwig Binswanger and Rollo May, to refer to the experience of people with delusions or other problems who have trouble seeing beyond a limited private world of their own minds or who confuse this private world with shared reality.

It was an important part of novelist Philip K. Dick's views on schizophrenia, as expressed in his 1964 essay "Schizophrenia & 'The Book of Changes'", where he drew on his familiarity with the existential psychologists, Heraclitus, and the I Ching. The koinos kosmos is mentioned in the Dick novel Lies Inc. where the protagonist mentions that he was "able to maintain contact with the stable objective koinos kosmos so that I never forgot that what I was seeing emanated from my own psyche".
