= Requisite organization =

Requisite organization (RO) is the system of business organization that aims for effective managerial organization and managerial leadership, based on the systematic application of scientific research about the nature of work and the nature of individual's capacity for work. The term and methodology were developed by Elliott Jaques and Kathryn Cason as a result of the research in stratified systems theory, general theory of bureaucracy, work complexity and human capability over 60 years.

== Definition ==
According to Jaques, "the term requisite organization means doing business with efficiency and competitiveness, and the release of human imagination, trust, and satisfaction in work."

Requisite organization is a system designed to get work done with effectiveness in producing valued goods and services to satisfy public needs and at the same time achieving the positive bottom line for the business by means of specialization of functions within vertical stratified and hierarchical organization that is referred to by Jaques as Managerial Accountability Hierarchy:

- Work outputs are continuously produced by process movement across vertical functions of work.
- Work and accountability for bottom line achievement cascade down successive levels and strata and a system of organizational layers or strata of bottom line generation units is formed.
- Managers hold immediate subordinates accountable for their own personal effectiveness in getting work done and for the output of their subordinates.

Requisite organization is a triple bottom line management methodology which uncovers dysfunctional aspects of strategy, systems, structures, and staff and then realigns them to fit the required complexity of the business, with the purpose to increase and sustain maximum economic value.

== Business complexity ==
Companies differ in the values they provide to their societies and the complexity of the business as employment systems they create to deliver those values with the purpose of growing and maintaining their bottom line.

According to requisite organization approach, the higher the complexity (quality and quantity) of a value that a company delivers to the society is, the higher the level of business complexity the company needs to create and maintain to deliver the value to the society effectively:

- If the level of the value delivered to the society is lower than the complexity of the business, then there is a probability that the company will struggle to achieve the positive bottom line by maintaining the higher business complexity than is justified by the society.
- If the level of the value delivered to the society is higher than the complexity of the business, then there is a probability that the quality and quantity and timeliness of the value delivered by the company to the society will be short of the society's expectations and, as a result, the company will be able to maintain the positive bottom line only over a short-term period – poor business sustainability.

An identification of the level of business complexity for the company is the foundation of requisite organization as all the other Requisite dimensions (Strategy, Systems, Structure, Staff) are aligned to the level of business complexity.

In Requisite Organization, companies are classified into eight levels of business complexity based on such criteria as type of value chain (single or multiple), geography of assets (local, regional, national, international, global), operating revenue, etc.

For example, for a Level 6 International Company with single value chain in multiple countries the following stratified hierarchy of bottom line units may be considered optimal in Requisite Organization:

- Stratum VI Corporate Bottom Line Unit
- Stratum V Business Bottom Line Unit
- Stratum IV Production Bottom Line Unit
- Stratum III Operating or Mutual Recognition Unit Bottom Line Unit
- Stratum II Output Teams or First Line Mutual Knowledge Bottom Line Unit
- Stratum I Direct Output Employees as accountable Stratum I Bottom Line Unit that underpins the key idea of Requisite Organization that every employee contributes to the business bottom line and the importance for an employee to work at their full potential.

== Requisite Organization International Institute ==
The Requisite Organization International Institute (US) was founded in 1999 by Jaques and Cason to continue development and expansion of research on the application of requisite organization. Jacques' tenth book, A General Theory of Bureaucracy (1976) integrates 25 years of basic science research underpinning stratified system theory. Another 27 years of research and 11 books reporting the findings made by Jacques and colleagues forms the foundation of the institute's research and development.
