= Michael Commons =

Theoretical behavioral scientist

Michael Lamport Commons (born 1939) is a theoretical behavioral scientist and a complex systems scientist. He developed the model of hierarchical complexity.

== Life and work ==
Michael Lamport Commons was born in 1939 in Los Angeles and grew up in Hollywood. Commons holds two B.A.s from University of California at Los Angeles (UCLA), one in mathematics, the other in psychology. He earned his M.A., and M.Phil. and in 1973 received his Ph.D., in psychology from Columbia University. Currently, he is Assistant Clinical Professor, Department of Psychiatry at Beth Israel Deaconess Medical Center (a teaching hospital of Harvard Medical School), and Director of the Dare Institute, Cambridge, Massachusetts.

His research interest is the quantitative analysis of psychological reality as it develops across the life span. With Francis Asbury Richards, Edward Trudeau, and Alexander Pekker, he developed the model of hierarchical complexity, a mathematical psychology model.

He is one of the cofounders of Society for Quantitative Analysis of Behavior, the Society for Research in Adult Development, the European Society for Research in Adult Development, the Society for Terrorism Research, and the Developmental Behavior Analysis Special Interest Group in the Association for Behavior Analysis International.

He is on the governing board of the Journal of Behavior Analysis Online. He is the past co-editor of the journal Behavioral Development Bulletin and the Journal of Behavior Analysis Online. He was a senior editor of Quantitative Analyses of Behavior, Volumes 1–11 and of four volumes on Adult Development including Beyond Formal Operations: Late Adolescent and Adult Cognitive Development and Clinical Approaches to Adult Development, as well as associate editor for a special issue of Journal of the Experimental Analysis of Behavior on the nature of reinforcement. He is the consulting editor of Moral Development Series.

== The model of hierarchical complexity ==
The model of hierarchical complexity (MHC), developed by Commons, is a way of measuring the complexity of a behavior. The MHC uses mathematical principles to quantify behavioral characteristics, assigning individuals to stages based on properly completed tasks. It can be used cross-culturally, across different species, and even for computers, and allows us to treat behavior accurately and in all-or-nothing terms. The MHC has many useful applications, such as in therapy, interventions, the development of organizations, etc.

== Organizations ==
=== Dare Association ===
Commons has been a part of the Dare Association, "an independent not-for-profit organization. Dare Association supports endeavors in the science and arts, especially behavioral science programs."

The International Health, Education and Development Division of Dare Association focuses on collaborating in the goal "of improving the wellbeing of people in developing countries".

=== Dare Institute ===
The Dare Institute is a group led by the Dare Association. This group is devoted to research in psychological topics such as human development, psychiatry and the law, political psychology, behavioral economics, and cognitive science.

=== Core Complexity Assessments ===
Commons is also associated with Core Complexity Assessments, a company that uses research in developmental psychology to pair candidates with jobs. Core Complexity Assessments' "tools are designed to help companies and managers hire smarter, retain workers, invest in employee development and human resources planning, and thereby shape the future organizational structure of the company".

== Patents ==
Commons, with Mitzi Sturgeon White, was issued a patent related to hierarchical stacked neural networks.

== Publications ==
=== Selected books ===
- 1984, Beyond formal operations: Vol. 1. Late adolescent and adult cognitive development. with F. A. Richards & C. Armon (Eds.), New York: Praeger.

=== Selected articles ===
- 1982, "Systematic and metasystematic reasoning: A case for a level of reasoning beyond Piaget's formal operations". With Richards, F. A., & Kuhn, D. in: Child Development, 53, 1058-1069.
- 1990. "Equal access" without "establishing" religion: The necessity for assessing social perspective-taking skills and institutional atmosphere". With J.A. Rodriguez In: Developmental Review, 10, 323-340.
- 1991, "A comparison and synthesis of Kohlberg's cognitive-developmental and Gewirtz's learning-developmental attachment theories". In: J. L. Gewirtz & W. M. Kurtines (Eds.), Intersections with attachment (pp. 257–291). Hillsdale, NJ: Erlbaum.
- 1993. "The development of hierarchically complex equivalence classes". With J.A. Rodriguez In: Psychological Record, 43, 667-697.
- 1993, "Atmosphere and stage development in the workplace". With Krause, S. R., Fayer, G. A., & Meaney, M. In: J. Demick & P. M. Miller (Eds.). Development in the workplace (pp. 199–220). Hillsdale, NJ: Lawrence Erlbaum Associates, Inc.
- 1995. "Formal, systematic, and metasystematic operations with a balance-beam task series: A reply to Kallio's claim of no distinct systematic stage". With others. In: Adult Development, 2 (3), 193-199.
- 1995. "Moral stage of reasoning and the misperceived "duty" to report past crimes (misprision)". With others. In: International Journal of Law and Psychiatry, 18(4), 415-424.
- 1997. Psychophysics of Stage: Task Complexity and Statistical Models. With: Goodheart, E. A., & Dawson T. L.. Paper presented at the International Objective Measurement Workshop at the Annual Conference of the American Educational Research Association, Chicago, IL.
- 1998. "Hierarchical Complexity of Tasks Shows the Existence of Developmental Stages". With others. In: Developmental Review, 8(3), 237-278.
- 2001, "A quantitative behavioral model of developmental stage based upon hierarchical complexity theory". With P.M. Miller. In: Behavior Analyst Today, 2(3), 222-240.
- 2002. "A complete theory of human evolution of intelligence must consider stage changes: A commentary on Thomas Wynn's Archeology and Cognitive Evolution". With P.M. Miller. In: Behavioral and Brain Sciences. 25(3), 404-405.
- 2004. "Development of behavioral stages in animals". With P.M. Miller. In: Marc Bekoff (Ed.). Encyclopedia of animal behavior. (pp. 484–487). Westport, CT: Greenwood Publishing Group.
- 2006. "Informed Consent: Do you know it when you see it?" With others in: Psychiatric Annals, June, 430-435.
- 2007. "Using Rasch scaled stage scores to validate orders of hierarchical complexity of balance beam task sequences". With others. In: E. V. Smith, Jr. & R. M. Smith (Eds.). Rasch measurement: Advanced and specialized applications (pp. 121–147). Maple Grove, MN: JAM Press
