= Developmental cognitive neuroscience =

Subfield of neuroscience

Developmental cognitive neuroscience is an interdisciplinary scientific field devoted to understanding psychological processes and their neurological bases in the developing organism. It examines how the mind changes as children grow up, interrelations between that and how the brain is changing, and environmental and biological influences on the developing mind and brain.

Developmental cognitive neuroscience is at the boundaries of neuroscience (behavioral, systems, & cognitive neuroscience), psychology (developmental, cognitive, & biobehavioral/ physiological psychology), developmental science (which includes sociology, anthropology, & biology in addition to psychology & neuroscience), cognitive science (which includes computer science, philosophy, dynamical systems, & linguistics in addition to psychology), and even includes socio-emotional development and developmental aspects of social neuroscience and affective neuroscience.

The scientific interface between cognitive neuroscience and human development has evoked considerable interest in recent years, as technological advances make it possible to map in detail the changes in brain structure that take place during development. Developmental cognitive neuroscience overlaps somewhat with fields such as developmental psychology, developmental neuropsychology, developmental psychopathology, and developmental neuroscience, but is distinct from each of them as well. Developmental cognitive neuroscience is concerned with the brain bases of the phenomena that developmental psychologists study. Developmental neuropsychology and developmental psychopathology are both devoted primarily to studying patients, whereas developmental cognitive neuroscience is concerned with studying both typical and atypical development. Developmental neuroscience is devoted entirely to the study of developmental processes in the brain, and primarily during the prenatal period. Developmental cognitive neuroscience, on the other hand, is concerned with interrelations between psychological and biological development. Developmental cognitive neuroscientists study brain development and cognitive, social, and emotional development from the prenatal period through adulthood.

More recently, developmental cognitive neuroscience is interested in the role of genes in development and cognition. Thus, developmental cognitive neuroscience may shed light on nature versus nurture debates as well as constructivism and neuroconstructivism theories. Developmental cognitive neuroscience research provides data that alternately blends together, clarifies, challenges, and causes revisions in developmental, cognitive, and neuroscientific theories.

== Origins of the discipline ==
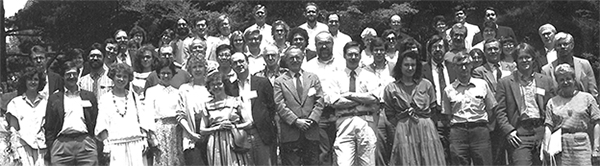
Participants at The Development and Neural Bases of Higher Cognitive Functions, Sugarloaf Conference Center, Philadelphia, Pennsylvania, 20–24 May 1989

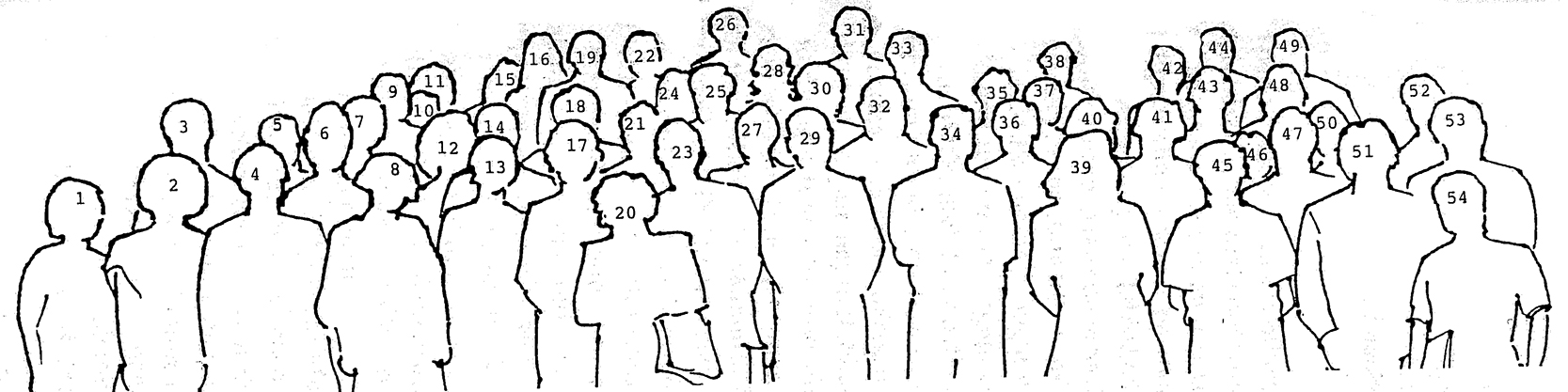
Participants as seen in the photo above: 1. Susan Rose, 2. Judy DeLoache, 3. William Overman, 4. Nathan Fox, 5. Kathryn Boyer, 6. Gerry Stefanatos, 7. Arthur Shimamura, 8. Nora Newcombe, 9. Stuart Zola-Morgan, 10. Judy Chasin, 11. Teresa Pantzer, 12. Barbara Malamut, 13. Adele Diamond, 14. Norman Krasnegor, 15. Marie Perri, 16. Jim Cummings, 17. Linda Acredolo, 18. Keith Nelson, 19. Barry Stein, 20. Rachel Clifton, 21. Richard Nakaniura, 22. Jackson Beatty, 23. Joseph Fagan, 24. Suzanne Craft, 25. Lewis Lipsitt, 26. Eric Knudsen, 27. Wendell Jeffrey, 28. Jonathan Cohen, 29. Joaquin Fuster, 30. Andrew Meltzoff, 31. Daniel Schacter, 32. Phillip Best, 33. Mark Stanton, 34. Douglas Frost, 35. Carolyn Rovee-Collier, 36. Paul Solomon, 37. Claire Kopp, 38. Lynn Nadel, 39. Helen Neville, 40. Emilie Marcus, 41. Richard Thompson, 42. Paula Tallal, 43. Robbie Case, 44. Henry Roediger III, 45. James Ranck Jr., 46. Ruth Colwill, 47. H. G. J. M. Kuypers, 48. Jocelyne Bachevalier, 49. Michael Noetzel, 50. Janet Werker, 51. Mike Richardson, 52. W. Stuart Millar, 53. Steven Keele, 54. Jean Mandler

The origin of the discipline of developmental cognitive neuroscience can be traced back to conference held in Philadelphia in 1989 co-funded by NICHD & NIMH, organized by Adele Diamond, that started the process of developmental psychologists, cognitive scientists, and neuroscientists talking with one another. To bridge the communication gaps, researchers were invited from different fields who were either using the same experimental paradigms to study the same behaviors or were investigating related scientific questions in complementary ways—though they were unaware of one another's work. They used different words to talk about their work and had different ways of thinking about it, but the concrete, observable behaviors, and the precise experimental conditions under which those behaviors occurred, served to make translation possible. Participants were a small Who's Who of leaders in developmental science, behavioral neuroscience, and cognitive science. Several new cross-disciplinary collaborations resulted from it, and it is a testament to the value of what came out of the meeting that Oxford University Press tried to acquire the rights to re-issue the book of the meeting's proceedings 10 years later—The Development and Neural Basis of Higher Cognitive Functions. (The original printing sold out faster than any other New York Academy of Science Annals issue has before or since.)

Developmental psychologists and neuroscientists used to know little of one another's work. There was so little communication between those fields that for 50 years scientists in both fields were using essentially the same behavioral assay but they did not know it. (Developmental psychologists called the measure the A-not-B task but neuroscientists called it the delayed response task.) In the early 1980s, Diamond not only showed these two tasks showed the identical developmental progression and rely on the same region of prefrontal cortex but through a systematic series of studies in human infants, and infant and adult monkeys with and without lesions to different brain regions. That work was absolutely pivotal in launching the field of developmental cognitive neuroscience because it established the very first strong link between early cognitive development and the functions of a specific brain region. That gave encouragement to others that rigorous experimental work addressing brain-behavior relations was possible in infants. It also fundamentally altered the scientific understanding of prefrontal cortex early in development; clearly it was not silent as accepted wisdom had held.

Mark Johnson's 1997 text Developmental Cognitive Neuroscience was seminal in coining the field's name.

== Tools and techniques employed ==
Neuroimaging techniques are fundamental to the study of childhood brain function: first EEG & ERPs, then fMRI, and more recently NIRS, MEG, & TMSallow researchers to observe brain activity, while MRI, DTI, & MRS are used to collect data on structural, connectivity, and metabolic activity. Before these techniques, researchers inferred healthy brain function by studying deficits caused by brain injury or impairment. These technological advances provided the foundational framework for the emergence of developmental cognitive neuroscience.

When doing in vivo analysis of the brain, we can use neuroimaging techniques to gain insights in order to further study developmental cognitive processes. By using these techniques to measure function in healthy children, as well as unhealthy children, we study the structure and anatomy of the brain, as well as connectivity and function, all of which can further enhance our greater understanding of the relationship between the human brain and behavior. The most interesting angle for developmental neuroimaging is the ability to learn more about how changes to the brain system that occur throughout childhood affect the development of cognitive abilities. It also allows researchers to explore questions that are typically referred to as "nature" versus "nurture." By using neuroimaging techniques, we can understand the biological process that underlie cognition and the relationship that it has with other external factors, like environmental exposures, learning, and collective life experiences.

EEG & ERPs: In the early to mid 1980s, early components of the Event Related Potential (ERP) were used to study sensory functioning in infants and late components of ERP were used to study cognitive functioning in adults. Scientists then proceeded to expand the use of ERP to study cognitive functioning earlier on in life to gain insights into the brain's involvement in different processes such as discrimination, categorization, and memory.

- Postsynaptic changes are reflected immediately in the EEG which makes this methodology optimal if the goal is to track rapid shifts in brain functioning. It is an efficient, and relatively inexpensive method, used to study developmental changes since it does not dramatically interfere with the normal, ongoing behavior occurring. EEG has been used in cognitive developmental studies that examined correlations between electrical brain activity and working memory throughout infancy and early childhood, and recall memory performance during toddlerhood, as well as detailing brain development changes on a month-to-month basis during infancy.
- A key advantage of EEG as an imaging method is that the experimental conditions can be designed to obtain a relatively low attrition rate. For infants, refusal to wear the EEG cap or removal of the cap is quite low, from zero to twelve percent, and while it spikes for ages 2–3 (30-45%), it drops back down by age four since they become more tolerant of the cap and move less during the recording.

Challenges of EEG for Developmental Neuroimaging

- Resolution: Although, there are some major challenges for developmental EEG research. While the EEG signal has excellent temporal resolution, it has very poor spatial resolution. Since the skull acts as a barrier between the EEG cap and the brain, it distorts the brain activity, which means that any signal recorded at the scalp was most likely generated by a large grouping of neurons over a wide area. All of this means that the electrodes are likely detecting electrical activity from a non-local group of neurons. By using dense electrode arrays, you can alleviate some of the concerns with spatial resolutions, but this also increases the cost.
- Artifacts: A significant amount of time must be dedicated to identification of artifacts. Researchers must eliminate portions of the EEF that are "contaminated" by motor movements or eye blinking even prior to data analysis. Since the EEG signal has such a small amplitude, motor movements and eye blinks will overpower the EEG signal and in effect, wipe it out. Some solutions for this are simultaneously recording electrooculogram (EOG), which is the recording of blinks, and lateral eye movement, and electromyogram (EMG), which is the recording of muscle movement. While eye blink correction algorithms are often used on adult EEG data, there is concern that these algorithms can filter maturation changes for young researchers. Therefore, it is better to select artifact-free data, which can hopefully provide a more accurate EEG developmental record.

MEG: MEG is a neuroimaging technique that records the magnetic fields that are generated by neural activity. A key advantage of this imaging technique is that it provides excellent spatial localization, as well as high temporal resolution of neural events. Like a lot of other popular non-invasive functional neuroimaging techniques such as fMRI and EEG/ERP, it has no harmful effects, no side effects, and no long-term detrimental effects. This means that using its attractive for use in research involving healthy populations and for use in developmental studies and in longitudinal developmental studies.

Data Collection: There are technical and subject factors that come into play when it comes to collecting MEG data for developmental studies.

- Technical Factors: One of the biggest challenges when trying to obtain clean data in younger children is movement artifacts. Voluntary movement artifacts, which include things like muscle and blinks, are a challenge that is not unique to MEG and can be addressed with known solutions, the physiological movement artifacts are those that are more problematic. Children that are younger have shorter necks and anatomically, their hearts and lungs lie closer to the MEG sensors. This means that their cardiorespiratory cycle is more dynamic with higher cardiac and respiratory rates, which compound and lead to frequency and very large motion artifacts. The shorter necks and small heads also mean that the surface of their head is quite distant from the MEG sensor, which is a significant challenge since magnetic signals are negatively correlated with distance. In order to account for this, the subject's head can be strategically placed so that the region of interest is closest to the sensors.
- Subject Factors: A large factor to take into account with developmental neuroimaging techniques is the challenges that arise with working with younger subjects. For younger children, anxiety and claustrophobia prove to be a significant challenge to mitigate for researchers.

Data Interpretation: When interpreting MEG data for developmental studies, there are many ways to analyze it since it is compounded with richness. Although, there are anatomical and physiological developments that can impact the observed results and if unfamiliar with these changes, a researcher could wrongly make an interpretation.

fMRI: The use of functional magnetic resonance imaging (fMRI) in developmental populations has increased significantly over the past two decades. Most developmental fMRI research uses cross-sectional sections, examining differences and similarities between children, adolescents, and adults. Although, the use of a cross-sectional study is limited in its ability to provide information about how brain function matures within a population. Therefore, the use of longitudinal fMRI studies offer the advantage of studying developmental processes and removing inter-subject variability. They also do not make any assumptions about the brain-behavior relationship, which makes them well suited to studying developmental changes.

- Challenges of fMRI for Developmental Neuroimaging: Although, they also present many challenges. Conducting these studies are costly, both in terms of a monetary expense and also in terms of time. It takes a period of many years to capture data and subject retention also must be very carefully managed, given that a high participant dropout rate can undermine the entire study. Also, longitudinal fMRI data analyses becomes more complicated due to the nature of the data and then violates the assumptions of independence made that underlie many statistical packages. Also, infants typically need to be fully asleep in order to conduct fMRI neuroimaging on them.
- Modeling Longitudinal Changes in Developmental Studies: When performing group analysis of functional neuroimaging datasets, there is a two step approach. The first-level analyses center on the subjects on an individual level, while the second-level analyses center on the group level, where the effects of interest are tested across subjects. The second-level step of analyses is what brings about particular statistical challenges for a longitudinal neuroimaging design. The standard- General Linear Model (GLM) is appropriate for designs where there is one scan per subject, but the basic tests in the main software statistical packages are not well suited for longitudinal data.

== See also ==
- Developmental Science (journal)
- Developmental psychology
- Social neuroscience
- Neuroscience
- Cognitive neuroscience
