= Sheree Toth =

American psychology professor

- Born: Sheree Lynn Toth
- Education: Case Western Reserve University
- Occupation: Psychology professor
- Spouse(s): James L Fulton (m. 1982) Dante Cicchetti (m. 1994)

Sheree Toth is a professor of psychology at the University of Rochester, as well as an associate professor of psychiatry and the executive director of the Mt. Hope Family Center. She works in the field of developmental psychopathology, especially concerning maltreated children.

== Education and career ==
Toth earned both a Master's degree and a Ph.D. in clinical psychology from Case Western Reserve University. She was associate director at the Hope Family Center, University of Rochester since 1985 She became director in 2005.

She served as associate editor of Development and Psychopathology.

=== Awards ===
Toth received:

- 2004, 2007: Outstanding Research Article Award from the American Professional Society on the Abuse of Children
- 2012: Dr. David Satcher Community Health Improvement Awards
- 2013: Outstanding research career achievement award from the American Professional Society on the Abuse of Children

== Publications ==
Toth has published in the following journals:

- Child Abuse & Neglect
- Research on Child and Adolescent Psychopathology
- Child and Adolescent Mental Health
- Child Maltreatment
- Development and Psychopathology

=== Books ===
- Cicchetti, Dante; Toth, Sheree L (1991). Models and Integrations: Rochester Symposium on Developmental Pathology 3 - Rochester Symposium on Developmental Psychology. Suffolk, UK: Boydell & Brewer Ltd. ISBN 9781878822314. Editor
- Cicchetti, Dante; Toth, Sheree L (1992). Developmental Perspectives on Depression. New York, UK: University of Rochester Press. ISBN 978-1878822161. Editor
- Cicchetti, Dante; Toth, Sheree L (1993). Child Abuse, Child Development, Social Policy. London, UK: Bloomsbury. ISBN 9781567500424. Editor
- Cicchetti, Dante; Toth, Sheree L (1994). Disorders and Dysfunctions of the Self. Suffolk, UK: Boydell & Brewer Ltd. ISBN 9781878822314. Editor
- Cicchetti, Dante; Toth, Sheree L (1998). Risk trauma, and memory : special issue. Cambridge, UK: Cambridge University Press. OCLC 150655456.
