= Kim Sterelny =

Australian philosopher

Kim Sterelny (born 1950) is an Australian philosopher and professor of philosophy in the Research School of Social Sciences at Australian National University and Victoria University of Wellington. He is the winner of several international prizes in the philosophy of science, and was previously editor of Biology and Philosophy. He is also a member of the Australian Academy of the Humanities. He is currently the First Vice President of the Division for Logic, Methodology and Philosophy of Science and Technology of the International Union of History and Philosophy of Science and Technology (2020–2023).

== Work ==
Sterelny's principal area of research is in the philosophy of biology. He states "the development of evolutionary biology since 1858 is one of the great intellectual achievements of science." Sterelny has also written extensively about the philosophy of psychology. He is the author of many important papers in these areas, including widely anthologised papers on group selection, meme theory and cultural evolution such as "Return of the Gene" (with Philip Kitcher), "Memes Revisited" and "The Evolution and Evolvability of Culture."

Together with his former student Paul Griffiths, in 1999, Sterelny published Sex and Death, a comprehensive treatment of problems and alternative positions in the philosophy of biology. This book incorporated a number of the positions developed in previous articles on the range of topics in the philosophy of biology. At certain points Sterelny and his coauthor differed (for example, on the Darwinian treatment of emotions and on the prospects for developmental systems theory).

In 2004 Sterelny's book Thought in a Hostile World: The Evolution of Human Cognition received the Lakatos Award for a distinguished contribution to the philosophy of science. This book provides a Darwinian account of the nature and evolution of human cognitive capacities, and is an important alternative to nativist accounts familiar from evolutionary psychology. By combining an account of neural plasticity, group selection, and niche construction, Sterelny shows how much of the data on which nativist accounts rely can be accounted for without attributing a large number of genetically hardwired modules to the mind/brain. In 2008 Sterelny was awarded the Jean-Nicod Prize. His lectures are published under the title, The Evolved Apprentice. These lectures build on the non-nativist Darwinian approach of Thought in a Hostile World, while providing a discussion of a great deal of recent work by other philosophers, biological anthropologists and ecologists, gene-culture co-evolution theorists, and evolutionary game theorists.

== Awards and honors ==
In 2013, he was awarded an Australian Laureate Fellowship. In 2004, he received the Lakatos Award for his book Thought in a Hostile World: The evolution of human cognition.

== Books ==
- Language and Reality (1987 – with Michael Devitt). MIT Press: ISBN 978-0-262-54099-5; ISBN 978-0-262-04173-7; Blackwell Publishing ISBN 978-0-631-19689-1
- The Representational Theory of Mind (1990) ISBN 978-0-631-16498-2
- Sex and Death (1999 – with Paul E. Griffiths). ISBN 978-0-226-77303-2
- The Evolution of Agency and Other Essays (2001). ISBN 978-0-521-64231-6
- Dawkins vs. Gould (2001). New, revised edition 2003, Icon Books ISBN 978-1-84046-471-9.
- Thought in a Hostile World: The evolution of human cognition (2003) ISBN 978-0-631-18887-2
- What is Biodiversity (2008 – with James Maclaurin). ISBN 978-0-226-50081-2
- The Major Transitions in Evolution Revisited (2011 – ed., with Brett Calcott). MIT Press, ISBN 978-0-262-01524-0
- The Evolved Apprentice (2012). MIT Press, ISBN 978-0-262-01679-7
- Cooperation and its Evolution (2013 – ed., with Richard Joyce, Brett Calcott and Ben Fraser). MIT Press, ISBN 978-0-262-01853-1
- From Signal to Symbol: The Evolution of Language, (2021 – with Ronald J. Planer) MIT Press, ISBN 978-0-262-04597-1
- The Pleistocene Social Contract: Culture and Cooperation in Human Evolution, 2021. Oxford University Press, ISBN 978-0-19-753138-9
