= Richard C. Maclaurin =

American physicist (1870–1920)

Richard Cockburn Maclaurin
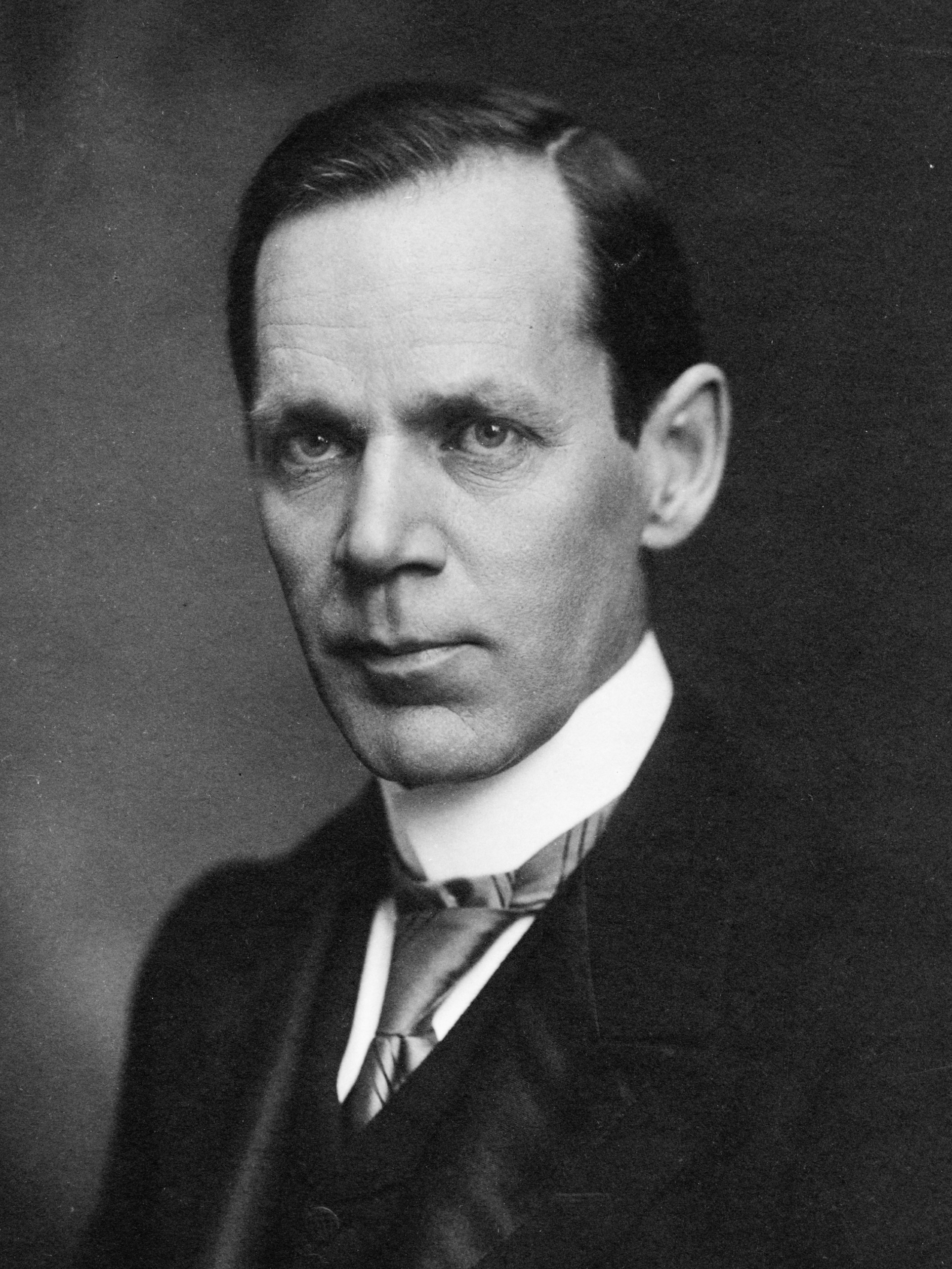
- Maclaurin in 1910

6th President of the Massachusetts Institute of Technology
- In office 1909–1920
- Preceded by: Arthur Amos Noyes (acting)
- Succeeded by: Elihu Thomson (acting)

Personal details
- Born: June 5, 1870 Selkirk, Scotland
- Died: January 15, 1920 (aged 49) Cambridge, Massachusetts
- Education: Auckland University College (B.Sc. (Hons), Mathematics, 1890); BA, 1895 (12th wrangler); LL.D., 1904, St John's College, University of Cambridge.
- Awards: Smith's Prize (1898)

Richard Cockburn Maclaurin (/ˈkoʊbərn/ KOH-bərn; June 5, 1870 – January 15, 1920) was a Scottish-born U.S. educator and mathematical physicist. He was made president of MIT in 1909, and held the position until his death in 1920.

During his tenure as president of MIT, the Institute moved across the Charles River from Boston to its present campus in Cambridge. In Maclaurin's honor, the buildings that surround Killian Court on the oldest part of the campus are sometimes called the Maclaurin Buildings.

Earlier, he was a foundation professor of the then Victoria College of the University of New Zealand from 1899 to 1907. A collection of lecture theatres at the Kelburn campus of that university were named after him. He was also a professor at Columbia University from 1907 to 1908.

== Personal ==
Maclaurin was born in Scotland, and was related to the noted Scottish mathematician Colin Maclaurin. He emigrated to New Zealand with his family at the age of four. In 1904 he married Alice Young of Auckland, and they had two sons. His brother James Scott Maclaurin (1864–1939) was a noted chemist, who invented a process for extracting gold with cyanide.

== Education ==
- University Entrance Scholar, 1887, Auckland Grammar School
- B.Sc. (Hons), Mathematics, 1890, Auckland University College.
- BA, 1895 (12th wrangler); LL.D., 1904, St John's College, University of Cambridge.

== Publications ==
- On the Nature and Evidence of Title to Realty, 1901
- Treatise on the Theory of Light, 1908

== Honors ==
- Smith's Prize in Mathematics, 1896
- Yorke Prize in Law, University of Cambridge, 1898
- Elected member of the American Philosophical Society, 1910
- Elected member of the America Academy of Arts and Sciences, 1911

Academic offices
Preceded by Henry Smith Pritchett	6th President of the Massachusetts Institute of Technology; 1909 – 1920	Succeeded by Ernest Fox Nichols
