= Karola Stotz =

German philosopher (1963–2019)

- Born: September 8, 1963; Neumünster, Schleswig-Holstein, Germany
- Died: October 14, 2019 (aged 56); Sydney, Australia

Philosophical work
- Era: Contemporary philosophy
- Region: Australian philosophy
- School: Process philosophy, Developmental Systems Theory, Extended Evolutionary Synthesis
- Main interests: Philosophy of biology, Philosophy of cognitive science, Philosophy of science
- Notable ideas: Developmental niche construction, Developmental systems account of human nature

Karola Stotz (September 8, 1963 – October 14, 2019) was a German scholar of philosophy of biology, cognitive science, and philosophy of science. With Paul E. Griffiths, she pioneered the use of experimental philosophy methods in the field of philosophy of science.

== Education and career ==
Stotz was born in Neumünster in Schleswig-Holstein. She received her Magister Artium in Biology and Social Sciences (Anthropology) in 1993 (University of Mainz) and her PhD in Philosophy from the University of Ghent, Belgium, in 1999 under the supervision of Gertrudis Van de Vijver and Werner Callebaut. In the period between 1999 and 2007 she worked at different universities of Australia and the United States of America. From 2008 until 2013, Stotz was Australian Research Fellow and, later, Bridging Support Fellow at the Department of Philosophy, University of Sydney. In 2014 she received the position of Senior Lecturer at the Department of Philosophy, Macquarie University, Australia. From 2014 to 2017, with her partner Paul Griffiths, Stotz worked on a Templeton World Charity Foundation project entitled: "Causal Foundations of Biological Information".

== Non-genetic inheritance and the Extended Evolutionary Synthesis ==
In different papers Stotz argues for an Extended Evolutionary Synthesis through the inclusion of non-genetic (extended, exogenetic) inheritance mechanisms and processes in the explanation of evolution. According to Stotz, the Modern Evolutionary Synthesis should go beyond the antinomy of biological vs cultural and revise more inclusive theories of gene-culture coevolution and niche construction. Such a revised theory of evolution should take into account genetic, epigenetic (molecular and cellular), behavioral, ecological, socio-cultural and cognitive-symbolic legacies. Stotz argues that:

"Environments, particularly in the form of developmental environments, do not just select for variation, they also create new variation by influencing development through the liable transmission of non-genetic but heritable information."

== Developmental Niche Construction ==
Stotz introduced the concept of Developmental Niche Construction as an integrative framework for the study of various non-genetic (exogenetic) inheritance mechanisms and for an explanation of how the environment (physical, biological or social) can construct new heritable variations during individual development. This concept originated in the idea of the 'ontogenetic niche' introduced in 1987 by developmental psychobiologists Meredith West and Andrew King, and theory of 'niche construction' presented by biologist John Odling-Smee in 1988. Stotz juxtaposes Developmental Niche Construction with Niche Constriction Theory and its concept of the 'Selective Niche' that stresses the role of selection in evolution rather than the production of new variation in developmental systems. She reconstructs the developmental system of DST as the Organism-Developmental Niche System. It informs the Developmental Systems Account of Human Nature developed together with Paul Griffiths.

== Extended Evolutionary Psychology ==
According to Stotz, there is a natural affinity between the theoretical view of the nature of the mind and an understanding of how the mind developed and evolved. "Which kind of evolutionary theory you apply matters deeply to which kind of (evolutionary) psychology you get." For example, the ideas of nativist's evolutionary psychologists are often based on the Modern Evolutionary Synthesis which explains the origin of behavioral, social and cognitive capacities by the sudden appearance of genetically determined mental modules or representational systems. As an alternative, Stotz proposes an Extended Evolutionary Psychology based on ideas of an Extended Evolutionary synthesis, Developmental Systems Theory, and embodied, embedded, enacted and extended models of cognition. She states that these approaches are a more appropriate alternative to traditional cognitivism and methodological individualism because they emphasise the importance of external scaffolding of cognition through developmental, ecological, cognitive and cultural niche construction.

== Selected publications ==
- Griffiths, P. E., Stotz, K. (2018). Developmental Systems Theory as a Process Theory. In: Daniel J. Nicholson and John Dupre (Eds.) Everything Flows: Towards a Processual Philosophy of Biology. Oxford: OUP.
- Stotz, K. (2014) Extended evolutionary psychology: the importance of transgenerational developmental plasticity // Frontiers in Psychology 5: 908. doi: 10.3389/fpsyg.2014.00908
- Griffiths, P., Stotz, K. (2013) Genetics and philosophy: An introduction. Cambridge University Press.
- Stotz, K. (2017) Why developmental niche construction is not selective niche construction: and why it matters // Interface Focus, 7(5), 20160157.
- Stotz, K. Allen, C. (2012) From cell-surface receptors to higher learning: a whole world of experience. In: Philosophy of Behavioral Biology. Katie Plaisance and Thomas Reydon (Eds.) Boston: Springer, 85–123.
- Griffiths, P. E., Stotz, K. (2008) Experimental Philosophy of Science // Philosophy Compass, 3 (3): 507–721.
