= Reydon (surname) =

Reydon is a Dutch surname. Notable people with the surname include:

- Thomas Reydon (born 1969), Dutch philosopher
- Hermannus Reydon (1896–1943), Dutch journalist and Nazi collaborator
