= I Am Gen Z =

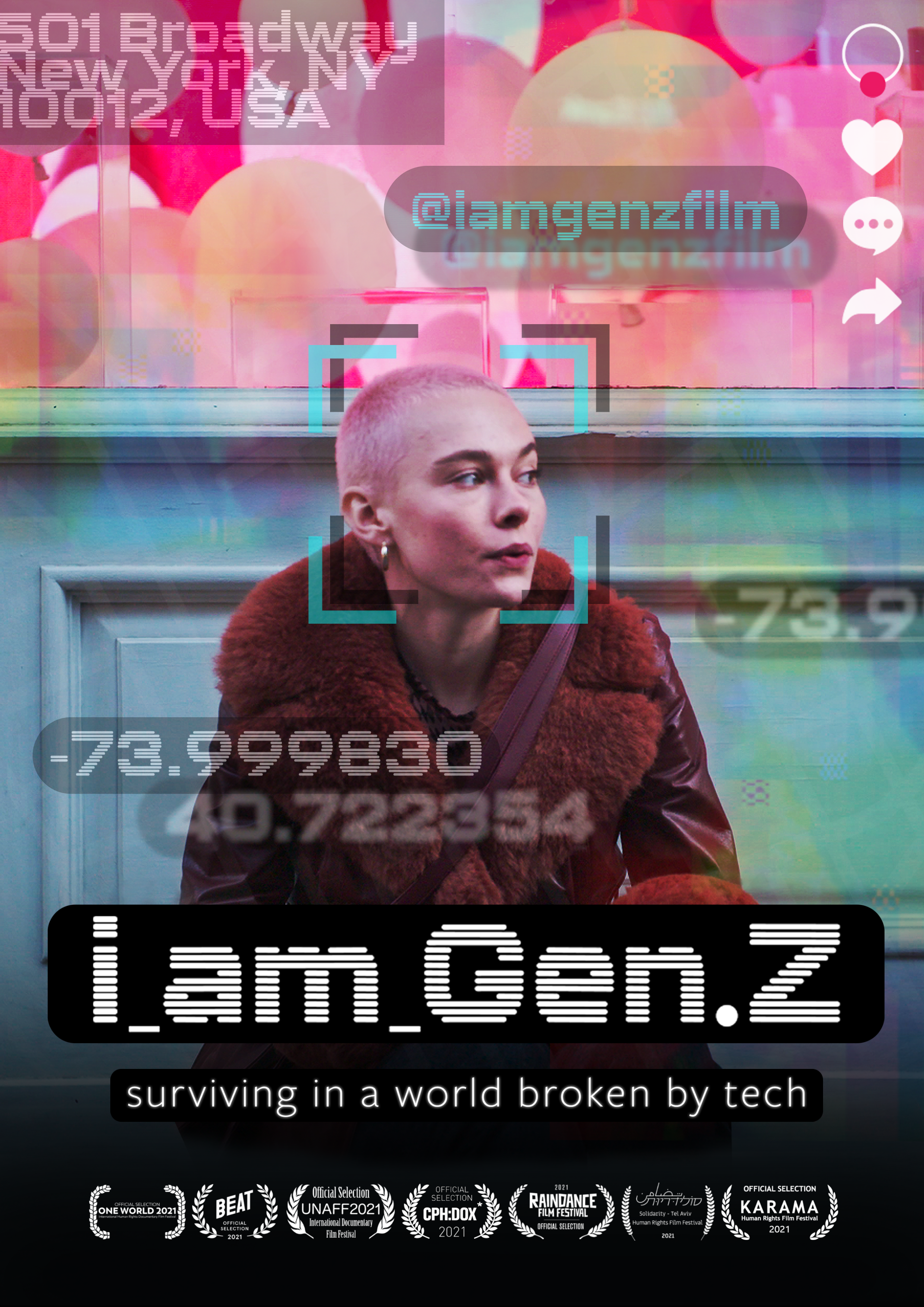
- Directed by: Liz Smith
- Written by: Liz Smith
- Produced by: Chantelle De Carvalho
- Starring: Dr. Tracy A. Dennis-Tiwary; Tim Kendall; Natasha Devon; Paul Barrett; Dr Jack Lewis; Jamie Bartlett; Clive Thompson; Dr Paul Marsden; Johnny Tooze; Marc Atherton; Dr Leslie Carr; Simon Wessely; David Halpern; Kathy Sheehan
- Cinematography: Mads Junker; Liz Smith
- Edited by: Liz Smith
- Music by: Kim Halliday (Original Score); Lottie Hartnack; MIRI; Sherika Sherard; Try Me
- Release date: 2021
- Running time: 100 minutes
- Country: United Kingdom
- Language: English

I Am Gen Z is a 2021 documentary film about the impact of the digital revolution on human society, the brain, and mental health, and how the forces driving the revolution are working against humanity. This has huge ramifications for the first generation growing up with mobile digital technology—Generation Z, born between 1995 and 2012.

Produced by Chantelle De Carvalho and directed and edited by Liz Smith, the film's music was composed by film composer Kim Halliday. I Am Gen Z premiered at the 2021 Copenhagen International Documentary Film Festival (CPH:DOX). The film is available in two versions: 100 minutes and a shortened 52 minutes.

The issues raised in the film are of interest not only to Gen Z members but also to parents, carers, and educators. The film attempts to promote a greater understanding of the effects of technology on the mental health and development of young people. Part of that endeavour is an innovative programme of educational outreach that runs alongside broadcast and VOD releases.

== Background ==
The documentary juxtaposes expert testimony against commentary and content from Generation Z contributors, the first generation to grow up with mobile digital technology. Contributing psychologists, scientists, writers and digital technologists include Tracy Dennis-Tiwary, Tim Kendall, Natasha Devon, Paul Barrett, Jack Lewis, Jamie Bartlett, Clive Thompson, Paul Marsden, Johnny Tooze, Marc Atherton, Leslie Carr, Simon Wessely, David Halpern and Kathy Sheehan.

The film explores a wide variety of issues facing the Generation Z community, including the effect of smartphones, body image and self-harm, mental health, dating and relationships, the power of algorithms and artificial intelligence, misinformation, and conspiracy theories. Experts explain the nature and science of each issue, along with discussions and content from Generation Z who have been affected or influenced by them.

== Synopsis ==
An investigation through expert interviews and the web lens of Generation Z, the documentary explores the impact of the digital revolution on our society, our brains and our mental health, how the forces driving it are working against humanity and have put us on a dangerous trajectory that has huge consequences for the first generation growing up with "always on" mobile digital technology.

Unfiltered viewpoints from a cast of Generation Z characters are expressed through their screen worlds, interplaying with expert analysis from psychologists, scientists, writers and digital technologists from the Generation X and Boomer years, as we explore how the explosion of the digital revolution is impacting our society, our brains and mental health.

This exploration of Generation Z shows the new normal for many young people today, whether in a small town in Arizona, London or the hubbub of New York. With self-deprecating humour, they talk to us in their language, through TikTok, YouTube and Instagram.

The children of Generation Z are becoming adults in a world mediated by digital technologies with little or no transparency, a planet facing climate change and an unprecedented global pandemic. We see the unfiltered reality of the mental health issues that Generation Z face, we are challenged to question: were we not blind to how smartphones would affect the lives of those being born around that time? Digital technology promised so much, but are the forces driving it too powerful for us to prevent a negative effect on the futures of Generation Z? Generation Z tell us how they see their future and how they refuse to be the ones to allow the negative effects to win.

== Cast ==
- Preston Seraph—American Generation Z activist
- Tracy Dennis-Tiwary, Ph.D.—Professor of Psychology and Neuroscience at the City University of New York
- Noella—American Generation Z activist
- Lucy Rydell—American Generation Z activist
- Tim Kendall—CEO of Moment, former president of Pinterest, & former director of monetization at Facebook
- Natasha Devon—British writer & activist
- Jack Lewis—British neuroscientist, television personality & author
- Paul Marsden—British consumer psychologist
- Marc Atherton—British chartered psychologist and behavioural scientist
- Lottie Hartnack—Generation Z musician
- MIRI—musician

== Educational Outreach ==
Part of the release programme for I Am Gen Z is an educational outreach licence, which allows schools, colleges and universities to screen the film in an educational context to students and academics. These licences allow the film to be shown as part of wider discussion, learning and understanding of the issues raised in the film, with additional material to support lesson planning, including virtual or personal appearances by the filmmakers and musicians from the film.

== Reception ==
The response to the film has been largely positive, but particularly in educational settings, where comments included "Sometimes you watch a film and wish it could be screened in every school, not just for the pupils but also their parents and teachers". (Movie Marker), and "the ground covered is impressive and the talking heads ... do know what they’re talking about" (Movie Steve).

The film has been successful in many Human Rights Film Festivals around the World, and was also shown at CPH:DOX, Raindance Film Festival.

The film won the Best Feature award at the 2022 Lower East Side Film Festival in New York.

Film Festival Showings
One World Festival	Prague	Czech Republic	10 May – 6 Jun 2021	
CPH:DOX	Copenhagen	Denmark	May 2021	World Premiere
Screening hosted by The Weizenbaum Institute in collaboration with the Goethe Institute	Berlin	Germany	5 Aug 2021	
Solidarity Human Rights Film Festival	Tel Aviv, Jerusalem	Israel	11 & 18 Dec 2021	In Competition
Karama Human Rights Film Festival	Amman	Jordan	5 – 10 Dec 2021	
Beat Festival	Moscow	Russia	8 Jun 2021	
Atlantida Film Festival	Mallorca	Spain	25 Jul – 26 Aug 2021	
Raindance Film Festival	London	United Kingdom	27 Oct – 7 Nov 2021	UK Premiere
United Nations Association Film Festival	Palo Alto, CA	United States of America	24 Oct 2021	US Premiere
Manchester Film Festival	Manchester	United Kingdom	18 Mar 2022	In Competition
NYC Indie Film Festival	New York, NY	United States of America	15 Jun 2022	
Lower East Side Film Festival	New York, NY	United States of America	7th – 11th Jul 2022	Winner - Best Feature

Broadcast/VOD Platforms
Foxtel/Binge	Broadcast/VOD	Australia	100 min version
Radio Canada	Broadcast	Canada (French)	52 min version
Emirates, Lufthansa, Swiss, JetBlue	VOD	In-Flight	100 min version
VGTV	Broadcast	Norway	100 min version
RTVE	Broadcast/VOD	Spain	100 min version
Gain	Broadcast	Turkey	100 min version
Al Jazeera	Broadcast	Middle East/North Africa	52 min version
Canal+	Broadcast	Poland	100 min version
Amazon Prime Video	VOD	United Kingdom	100 min version
Amazon Prime Video	VOD	United States	100 min version

== See also ==
- Algorithmic radicalization
- Digital media use and mental health
- Problematic social media use
