= Susan Oyama =

American philosopher

Susan Oyama (born May 22, 1943) is a philosopher of biology, a developmental systems theorist and a professor of psychology; currently professor emerita at the John Jay College and CUNY Graduate Center in New York City.

Oyama's work interrogates the nature versus nurture debates, and problematizes the conceptual foundations (e.g., assumptions, binaries, and classifications) on which these debates depend. Her notion of a "developmental system" allows us to reevaluate and reintegrate standard dichotomies such as development and evolution, body and mind, and stasis and change. Oyama's Developmental systems theory has had a significant impact in cognitive science, psychology, and the philosophy of biology.

She graduated from Mills College and Harvard University.

== Personal life ==
She married the Italian composer Luciano Berio in 1966. They divorced in 1972.

== Publications ==
Books, as author

- Evolution's Eye: A Systems View of the Biology-Culture Divide (2000), ISBN 978-0-8223-2472-0
- L'occhio dell'evoluzione. Una visione sistematica della divisione fra biologia e cultura (italian translation) (2000), ISBN 978-8887319491
- The Ontogeny of Information (2000), originally published in 1985, and revised for republication, is regarded as a foundational text in developmental systems theory ISBN 978-0-8223-2466-9

Books, as editor

- Cycles of Contingency (2001) edited by Russell D. Gray, Paul E. Griffiths and Susan Oyama, ISBN 9780262150538

Papers

- Oyama, S (2010). "Biologists behaving badly: Vitalism and the language of language". History and Philosophy of the Life Sciences. 32 (2–3): 401–423. JSTOR 23335080. PMID 21162376.
- Oyama, S (1990). "Commentary. The idea of innateness: Effects on language and communication research". Developmental Psychobiology. 23 (7): 741–760. doi:10.1002/dev.420230713. PMID 2286301.

== See also ==
- Epigenetics
- Evo-devo
- Modern evolutionary synthesis
