= Paul E. Griffiths =

Australian philosopher of science

Paul Griffiths
- Born: 1962 (age 63–64); England
- Education: B.A., University of Cambridge (1984); Ph.D., Australian National University (1989)
- Occupation: Philosopher
- Employer: University of Sydney
- Known for: Developmental systems theory
- Notable work: Sex and Death (1999); Genetics and Philosophy (2013)
- Title: Challis Professor of Philosophy
- Awards: Fellow of the American Association for the Advancement of Science; Fellow of the Australian Academy of the Humanities

Paul Griffiths is Emeritus Professor of Philosophy at the University of Sydney. Griffiths works primarily in the philosophy of science and, in particular, philosophy of biology.

Born in England in 1962, Griffiths received a B.A. from the University of Cambridge in 1984 and a Ph.D. in philosophy from the Australian National University in 1989, under the supervision of Kim Sterelny. He taught previously at the University of Pittsburgh, the University of Queensland and the University of Otago. He spends part of each year at the University of Exeter in the Egenis: the Centre for the Study of the Life Sciences. Griffiths is a Fellow of the American Association for the Advancement of Science and of the Australian Academy of the Humanities.

Griffiths, together with Russell Gray developed a theoretical perspective on biological development, heredity, and evolution known as developmental systems theory (DST).

Together with his former advisor Kim Sterelny, in 1999, Griffiths published Sex and Death, a comprehensive treatment of problems and alternative positions in the philosophy of biology. This book incorporated a number of the positions developed in previous articles on the range of topics in the philosophy of biology.

His latest book, published in 2013, in collaboration with Karola Stotz, focuses on the philosophy of genetics.

In 2022 he was appointed Challis Professor of Philosophy,a position held until his retirement in 2024.

== Books ==
=== Monographs ===
- Griffiths, P. E. (1997). What Emotions Really Are: The Problem of Psychological Categories. Chicago, University of Chicago Press.
- Sterelny, K. and P. E. Griffiths (1999) Sex and Death: An Introduction to the Philosophy of Biology. Chicago, University of Chicago Press.
- Griffiths, P. E., & Stotz, K. (2013). Genetics and Philosophy: An introduction. New York: Cambridge University Press.

=== Edited volumes ===
- Griffiths, P.E (Ed.) (1992). Trees of Life: Essays in Philosophy of Biology. Dordrecht, Kluwer.
- Oyama, S., P. E. Griffiths and R.D. Gray (Eds.) (2001). Cycles of Contingency: Developmental Systems and Evolution. MIT Press.

== Awards and honors ==
In 2017, he was awarded an Australian Laureate Fellowship.
