= Relational developmental systems =

Psychological framework

Relational developmental systems (RDS) is a developmental psychological metatheory and conceptual framework. It is an extension of developmental systems theory that is based on the view that relationism is a superior alternative to Cartesian mechanism. RDS is the leading framework in modern developmental science. According to RDS metatheory, interactions between individuals and their environments, rather than either entity acting separately, are the cause of all aspects of human development. The term "relational developmental systems paradigm" has been used to refer to the combination of the RDS metatheory and the relationist worldview. The RDS framework is also fundamentally distinct from that of quantitative behavioral genetics, in that the former focuses on the causes of individual development, while the latter focuses on individual differences. RDS theorists reject the dichotomies associated with Cartesian dualism, such as those between nature and nurture, and between basic and applied science.

== Origins ==
Relational Developmental Systems (RDS) is a set of rules for the theories in developmental psychology. It is based on a worldview known as relationism.

Worldviews are approaches taken to understand how the world works. Relationism is a worldview suggesting that no element is separate to the context around it, including its relations to other elements. It is against the Cartesian worldview, which splits opposite ideas into divisions such as 'nature-versus-nurture', 'mind versus the body' and 'culture versus biology'. Relationism instead forms explanations by combining ideas, even if they are separate and conflicting. RDS and relationism can be combined to form an overall scientific framework for human development.

RDS can also be considered as an extension to developmental systems theory, which suggests that factors such as genes and the environment interact to influence development.

== Assumptions ==
Relational Developmental Systems proposes that human development cannot be understood without understanding the multiple relationships between individuals and their biological, psychological, social and historical contexts. It therefore rejects the idea that development is primarily influenced by one factor, such as genetics. Current developmental psychologists explore the various types of relationships between the individuals and their context.

Individuals can have an active role in choosing which contexts to engage with based on the benefits they provide. From an evolutionary perspective of psychology, this can be beneficial for survival.

RDS also emphasises that individuals can constantly develop across their life-span. These changes can occur across time and across locations. RDS also suggests that experiences, thoughts and emotion are influenced by the link between a person, their biology and their culture.

Research into RDS involves flexible research approaches considering associations across multiple variables, moving away from methods attempting to explain behaviour in terms of one causal variable. RDS uses longitudinal studies to measure an individual's development across time, as well as methods that consider individuals, rather than variables, as the key focus of the study. Research indicates that RDS-based research approaches do not have to be in conflict with research methods into quantitative behaviour genetics, which is a field considering genes and the environment as separate influences on behaviour.

The 4-H study is a longitudinal study investigating how RDS can explain the development of adolescents' positive behaviours. It investigated factors influencing adolescents' development of five key traits: confidence, caring, connection, character and ability to perform a task. This study was conducted across 7 years of the adolescents' lives. Researchers found that positive youth development was influenced by contextual factors such as relationships with family and friends, as well as individual factors such as natural motivation and engagement levels.

The 4-H study also provided evidence for the individual having an active role in their development. Adolescents were able to optimise their development by adjusting their personal goals and expectations based on the social situation and the environmental resources that they had access to.

== Applications ==
The principles behind RDS have useful applications for developmental science.

RDS presents adolescents in a more positive light than some previous developmental science research, which portrayed adolescents as trouble-makers and poor contributors to society. Therefore, RDS can be used to encourage positive development in adolescents. RDS suggests that due to our ability to constantly change, adolescents have the potential to develop co-operative and considerate behaviours. There has been increasing research into how policies can encourage adolescents' use of this potential by altering the context that individuals are in. Research also applies RDS to understanding the development of adolescents' health.

In addition, RDS can be used to understand how senior citizens' involvement with sport can change. Research from the 'European Review of Ageing and Physical Activity' indicated that a combination of individual-related and context-related factors can influence sports participation in the elderly.

Individual-related influences on senior citizens' sports involvement included:

- Income
- Education level
- Living arrangements
- Individuals' competitiveness levels

Context-related influences included:

- The opportunity to connect with others through sport
- Family members' attitudes towards the individuals' engagement with sport

Within developmental psychology, RDS can be applied to understanding multiple forms of development, including our moral development and our development of consciousness.

When considering the broader fields of psychology and behavioural science, RDS parallels new approaches taken to evolution and to the mind-body problem. A recent approach to evolution indicates that we can evolve through our genes' constant adaptations to environmental contexts. Findings from the International Journal of Epidemiology links this research to RDS, suggesting that our ability to change over time involves interaction between genes and the environment. The approach of RDS also influences the view that the mind is not separate from the context of our physical body.

Research suggests that RDS is currently considered to be the "leading framework in developmental science". It can provide a foundation for recent discoveries in the fields of genetics, evolution and cultural psychology, that are based on interactions between elements.

== Criticisms ==
The approach of RDS to methodology can be practically difficult to commit to and therefore pose a "challenge" to researchers. It can also be difficult to select factors influencing each individuals' development. In practice, this difficulty create uncertainty when evaluating programs influencing young peoples' development.

It can also be hard to apply results from research that gathered data from a particular point in time to the whole duration of a person's development. This is further supported by research from the journal 'Human and Development', which suggests that it may be hard to apply research based on RDS to all situations that an individual can be in.

Although RDS rejects the Cartesian worldview, this worldview has been "influential" in developmental science in the past. For example, a cognitive approach to the mind-body problem suggesting that the mind is the brain and separate from external environments is "framed" by a Cartesian approach. Moreover, some cross-cultural research in developmental psychology has considered culture as being separate from the individual.
