= Tracy Dennis-Tiwary =

American Female Clinical Psychologist

Tracy A. Dennis-Tiwary
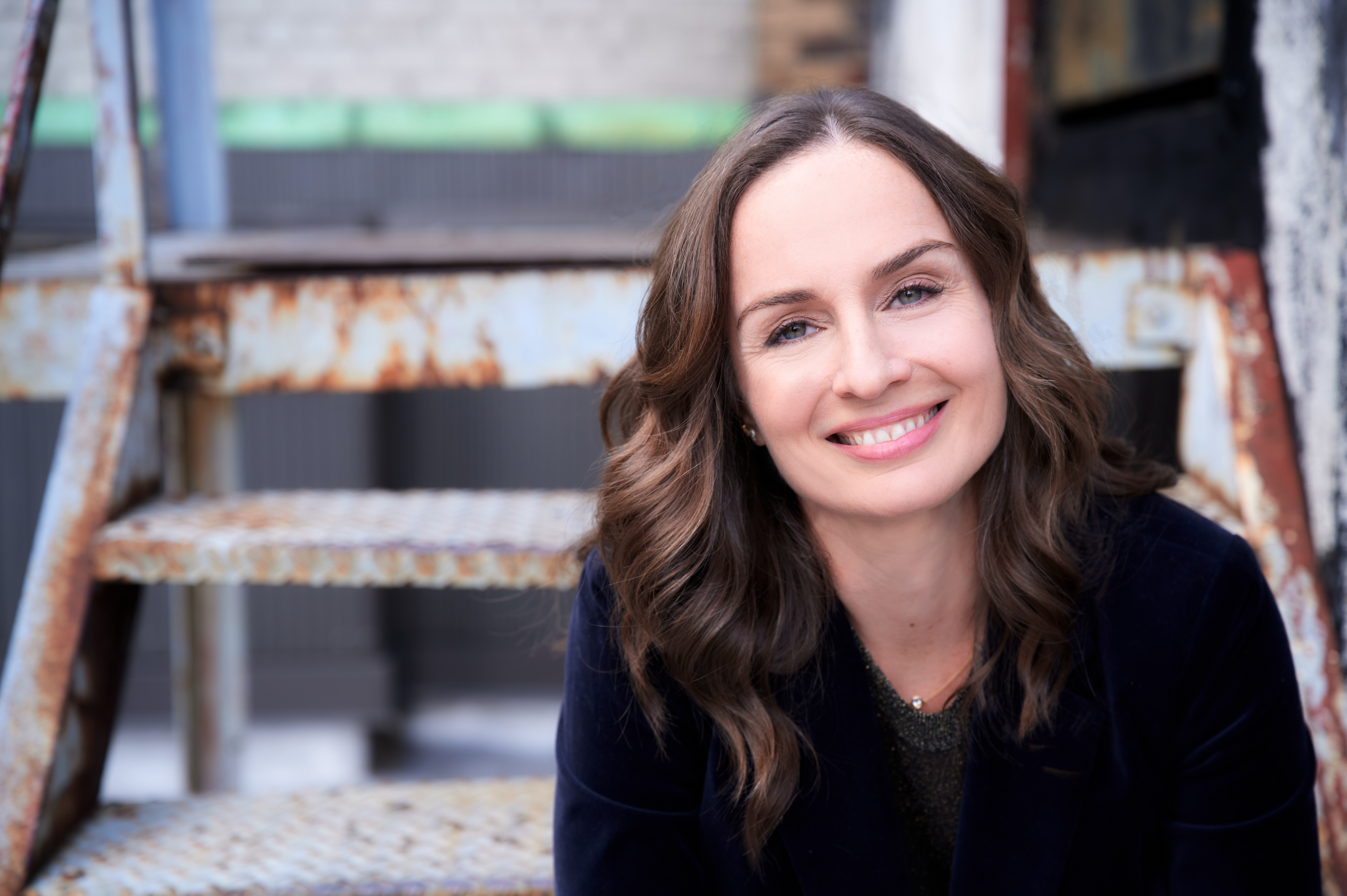
- Born: January 11, 1973 (age 53); Sayre, Pennsylvania, U.S.
- Education: University of Rochester; Pennsylvania State University
- Spouse: Vivek J. Tiwary
- Children: 2
- Scientific career
- Fields: Clinical psychology
- Workplaces: Hunter College; City University of New York
- Website: https://www.drtracyphd.com

Tracy Dennis-Tiwary (born January 11, 1973) is an American clinical psychologist, author, health technology entrepreneur, and professor of psychology and neuroscience at Hunter College and the Graduate Center of The City University of New York. Her research explores emotion regulation and its role in mental health and illness, with a particular focus on anxiety and anxiety-related attention biases, as well as child emotional development.

Dennis-Tiwary is an early pioneer and researcher in the field of gamified digital therapeutics, including attention bias modification and gamified mobile applications for the remediation of anxiety, stress, substance abuse, and other mental and behavioral health problems.

== Early life and education ==
Dennis-Tiwary was born in Sayre, Pennsylvania. After being admitted to the Eastman School of Music of the University of Rochester as a performance major (oboe), she shifted her focus of study to graduate summa cum laude with her B.A. in psychology in 1995, where she studied approach and avoidance motivation with Andrew Elliot and child maltreatment with Dante Cicchetti at the Mt. Hope Family Center. She received her Ph.D. in clinical psychology from Pennsylvania State University in 2001, where she specialized in the study of emotion regulation, parent-child interactions, and the cross-cultural context of emotional development and adjustment. From 2002 to 2004 she completed her postdoctoral training in intervention science at the Institute for Risk at the New York University Grossman School of Medicine.

== Career ==
Since 2004, Dennis-Tiwary has worked as a professor in the Department of Psychology at Hunter College of the City University of New York, where she also serves as the co-executive director of the Center for Health Technology, and as a member of the graduate faculty in behavioral and cognitive neuroscience as well as health psychology and clinical science at The Graduate School of the City University of New York.

In 2019, she co-founded and serves as chief science officer for the digital therapeutics company Arcade Therapeutics, where the mission is to use breakthrough science to develop therapeutic mobile games that improve mental health, with a focus on anxiety- and stress-related disorders, addiction, major depressive disorder, and combinations with brain stimulation. Her work in digital therapeutics, including her role as co-founder of Arcade Therapeutics (formerly Wise Therapeutics), was the front cover story of the November 2021 issue of StartUp Health Magazine.

In May 2022, she published the book Future Tense: Why Anxiety Is Good For You (Even Though It Feels Bad) with HarperWave, a division of HarperCollins. Central to the book is a critique of the medical model of mental illness, focusing on anxiety as a prime case in point, arguing that a disease approach to anxiety fails to distinguish between normal and pathological forms of emotional suffering, and inadvertently contributes to societal increases in mental health problems.

== Research ==
Dennis-Tiwary founded the Emotion Regulation Lab at Hunter College, where she examines biological, psychological, and social factors in the development of emotion regulation across the lifespan, its implications for mental health and illness (with a focus on anxiety and teen risk for suicide), and neurocognitive processes underlying novel treatment approaches (like attention bias modification) for anxiety, stress, addiction, and other behavioral health problems.

=== Findings ===
==== Emotion regulation ====
In addition to Dennis-Tiwary's notable theoretical and methodological work on emotion regulation, she has advanced the identification of clinically relevant neural signatures for emotion regulatory capacities and vulnerabilities, such as EEG asymmetry and scalp-recorded event-related potentials (ERP). For example, Dennis-Tiwary and colleagues were the first to show that the late positive potential (LPP) varies with emotion regulation abilities in children as young as five years of age. She further showed that these ERPs are developmentally sensitive, and predict individual differences in emotion regulation behaviors and adjustment in children and adults and in cognitive control capacities.

==== Attention biases and attention bias modification ====
Dennis-Tiwary has made novel contributions to the understanding of the anxiety-related attention bias—termed the threat bias—or selective and exaggerated attention to threat. This includes developing innovative neurocognitive and behavioral measurement approaches, documenting the contextual sensitivity of these measures and validating their predictive associations with treatment response and the severity of anxiety symptoms over time.

Dennis-Tiwary is also a leading researcher in the study of attention bias modification (ABM), a class of computerized cognitive training protocols that are designed to remediate attention biases underlying mental and behavioral health problems. Extending ABM to problems with alcohol consumption, Dennis-Tiwary and colleagues found that ABM for alcohol-related attention biases reduced alcohol craving in problem drinkers after a single session. She created and clinically validated the first gamified mobile ABM app for reducing anxiety and stress called Personal Zen. Personal Zen is regularly included in media round-ups of the field's top anxiety-relieving mobile apps.

==== Social media and social-emotional adjustment ====
Dennis-Tiwary has examined the impact of social media on emotional functioning, including the development of a validated questionnaire, the Social Media and Communication Questionnaire (SMCQ). In other research, Dennis-Tiwary and colleagues at the Pennsylvania State University developed a novel modification of the classic Still Face paradigm to model and examine the impact of parental withdrawal via mobile devices. Findings suggested that consistent parental withdrawal during mobile device use could have a negative social-emotional impact on developing children and the parent-child relationship. This study was recreated in 2019 for a network TV special report for ABC entitled, "ScreenTime: Diane Sawyer Reporting."

== Media, awards, and honors ==
Since 2017, Dennis-Tiwary has written the column "More Than a Feeling" for Psychology Today. Her work was the subject of the 2013 documentary Changing Minds at Concord High and she appeared in the 2021 documentary I Am Gen Z. She has spoken and presented her research at the United Nations, the National Institute of Mental Health, the New York Academy of Sciences, the Personal Democracy Forum, and the Rubin Museum Brainwave Festival.

Dennis-Tiwary has served on the editorial boards of Affective Neuroscience since 2019 and the Journal of Clinical Child and Adolescent Psychology since 2017. She is a fellow of the Association for Psychological Science (APS) as well as a member of the Society for Research in Child Development, the Society for Cognitive Neuroscience, the Association for Behavioral and Cognitive Therapies, and the Anxiety and Depression Association of America.

Since 2020, Dennis-Tiwary has served as a research advisor for the Global Day of Unplugging and the Hunter College Food Policy Center, as well as a media consultant for ABC News and NBC/Universal from 2017 to 2021. She served as a consultant to the NYC Public School System from 2017 to 2019 and the New York Chapter of the National Alliance on Mental Illness in 2020.

== Bibliography ==
- Future Tense: Why Anxiety is Good for You (Even Though It Feels Bad) (New York: Harper Collins, 2022) ISBN 9780063062122

== Selected journal articles ==
- Myruski, S., Cho, H., Bikson, M., & Dennis-Tiwary, T.A. (2021). Transcranial direct current stimulation (tDCS) augments the effects of gamified, mobile attention bias modification, Frontiers in Neuroergonomics, 2.
- Dennis-Tiwary, T.A., Denefrio, S., Myruski, S. & Roy, A. (2019). Heterogeneity of the anxiety-related attention bias: A review and working model for future research. Clinical Psychological Science, 7(5), 879–899.
- Myruski, S., Gulyayeva, O. Birk, S., Perez-Edgar, K., Buss, K.A., & Dennis-Tiwary, T.A. (2017). Digital disruption?: Maternal mobile device use is related to infant social-emotional functioning. Developmental Science.
- Dennis-Tiwary, T.A., Denefrio, S., & Gelber, S. (2017). Salutary effects of an attention bias modification mobile application on biobehavioral measures of stress and anxiety during pregnancy. Biological Psychology, 127, 148–156.
- Luehring-Jones, P., Louis, C., Erblich, J., & Dennis-Tiwary, T. (2017). A single session of attentional bias modification reduces alcohol craving and implicit measures of alcohol bias in young adult drinkers. Alcoholism: Clinical and Experimental Research, 41(12), 2207–2216.
- Dennis, T.A., & O'Toole, L. (2014). Mental health on the go: Effects of a gamified attention bias modification mobile application in trait anxious adults. Clinical Psychological Science, 2(2), 1–15.
- Dennis, T.A., Buss, K.A., Hastings, P.D. (Eds.; 2012). Physiological measures of emotion from a developmental perspective: State of the science. Monographs of the Society for Research in Child Development, 77(2).
- Dennis, T.A., & Hajcak, G. (2009). The late positive potential: a neurophysiological marker for emotion regulation in children. Journal of Child Psychology and Psychiatry, 50, 1373–1383.
- Cole, P.M., Martin, S.E., & Dennis, T.A. (2004). Emotion regulation as a scientific construct: Challenges and directions for child development research. Child Development, 75, 317–333.
