= Mt. Hope Family Center =

University of Rochester research center in Rochester, NY

The Mt. Hope Family Center, located in Rochester, NY, is a research center affiliated with the University of Rochester that integrates its research with clinical therapy methods. The Center focuses on helping at-risk impoverished families overcome challenges such as childhood maltreatment, trauma, and major depressive disorder.

== History ==
Mt. Hope Family Center was established in 1979 as a therapeutic preschool for children affected by violence From 1984 to 2005, the center was directed by Dante Cicchetti, who worked to add a wider range of services and a heavier emphasis on research in the center. During this time, Cicchetti also began the journal Development and Psychopathology which is still based at Mt. Hope Family Center. The center carries out research on child development, particularly of children who have dealt with maltreatment. It also provides services to adults who face problems with severe familial dysfunction and they work heavily with lower income families who experience much stress in their daily lives. In 2005, Sheree Toth became executive director.

== Projects and programs ==
Mt. Hope Family center offers multiple community services and they have several projects in place to help foster growth in families and study new ways to help those who have been maltreated. One recent project was SOLAR, or the Study of Late Adolescent Resilience, which works to see how "early identified vulnerabilities contribute to substance abuse and mental health problems later in development." The center also has multiple ongoing programs such as an After School program for at risk youth, parenting classes for parents who are involved with the Monroe County Department of Human Services, child-parent psychotherapy, and trauma-focused cognitive behavioral therapy.
