= Dante Cicchetti =

Psychologist known for developmental psychopathology research

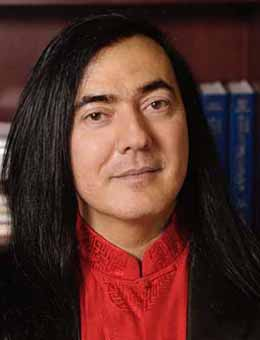
- Born: Pittsburgh, Pennsylvania, U.S.
- Education: University of Minnesota
- Awards: James McKeen Cattell Fellow Award (2014)
- Scientific career
- Fields: Developmental psychopathology, psychiatry, developmental science, molecular genetics
- Workplaces: University of Minnesota, University of Rochester
- Doctoral advisor: Paul E. Meehl and L. Alan Sroufe

Dante Cicchetti is an American developmental psychologist and a prominent figure in the field of developmental psychopathology. As of 2025, he holds the title of professor emeritus at the College of Education and Human Development, University of Minnesota. He previously held a joint appointment in the Department of Psychiatry at the University of Minnesota Medical School and served as the McKnight Presidential Endowed Chair and the William Harris Endowed Chair. In 1989, Cicchetti founded the academic journal Development and Psychopathology, where he served as editor-in-chief until 2024.

== Biography ==
Dante Cicchetti was born on August 25, 1948, in Pittsburgh, Pennsylvania. He earned his Bachelor of Science degree from the University of Pittsburgh and later received his Doctor of Philosophy degree from the University of Minnesota in 1972, specializing in clinical psychology and developmental psychology. From 1977 to 1985, he served on the faculty of Harvard University, where he held the position of Norman Tishman Associate Professor of Psychology. In 1985, Cicchetti moved to University of Rochester, where he became the director of the Mt. Hope Family Center.

== Career ==
While at Harvard, he conducted research on emotional development, Down syndrome, child maltreatment, and the development of conditions such as depression and borderline personality disorder. In 1984, he edited a special issue of Child Development on developmental psychopathology to introduce the field to the developmental research community.

Cicchetti's research focuses on developing an integrative developmental theory to explain human psychological functioning. His work spans multiple domains, including developmental psychopathology, the effects of child maltreatment, neuroplasticity, and sensitive periods. He has also studied the impact of traumatic experiences on brain development, the biology and psychology aspects of unipolar and bipolar mood disorders, and the interactions among molecular, genetic, neurobiological, socio-emotional, cognitive, linguistic, and representational development in both typical and atypical populations. Additionally, his research examines attachment relationships, self-representation disorders across the lifespan, and multilevel perspectives on resilience.

Cicchetti's research has been funded by the National Institute of Mental Health, the National Institute of Drug Abuse, the Office of Child Abuse and Neglect, and the William T. Grant Foundation.

== Professional societies ==
- Fellow, American Association for the Advancement of Science (AAAS)
- Fellow, Association for Psychological Science

== Selected works ==
- Cicchetti, D., & Rogosch, F. A. (2012). Gene by Environment interaction and resilience: Effects of child maltreatment and serotonin, corticotropin releasing hormone, dopamine, and oxytocin genes. Development and Psychopathology, 24(2).
- Cicchetti, D., Rogosch, F. A., & Oshri, A. (2011). Interactive effects of corticotropin releasing hormone receptor 1, serotonin transporter linked polymorphic region, and child maltreatment on diurnal cortisol regulation and internalizing symptomatology. Development and Psychopathology, 23, 1125–1138.
- Cicchetti, D. (2010). Resilience under conditions of extreme stress: A multilevel perspective [Special Article]. World Psychiatry, 9, 1–10.
- Cicchetti, D., Rogosch, F. A., Toth, S. L., & Sturge-Apple, M. L. (2011). Normalizing the development of cortisol regulation in maltreated infants through preventive interventions. Development and Psychopathology, 23, 789–800.
- Cicchetti, D. (2004). An odyssey of discovery: Lessons learned through three decades of research on child maltreatment. American Psychologist, 59(8), 4–14.
- Cicchetti, D., & Rogosch, F. (1999). Psychopathology as risk for adolescent substance use disorders: A developmental psychopathology perspective. Journal of Clinical Child Psychiatry, 28, 355–365.

== Books edited ==
- Cicchetti, D., & Cohen, D. J. (Eds.). (2006). Developmental psychopathology: Theory and method (Vol. 1, 2nd ed.). New York: Wiley.
- Cicchetti, D., & Cohen, D. J. (Eds.). (2006). Developmental psychopathology: Developmental neuroscience (Vol. 2, 2nd ed.). New York: Wiley.
- Cicchetti, D., & Cohen, D. J. (Eds.). (2006). Developmental psychopathology: Risk, disorder, and adaptation. (Vol. 3, 2nd ed.). New York: Wiley.
- Attachment in the Preschool Years: Theory, Research, and Intervention by Dante Cicchetti, Mark T. Greenberg, E. Mark Cummings. ISBN 0226306305 (0-226-30630-5).
- Child Maltreatment: Theory and Research on the Causes and Consequences of Child Abuse and Neglect by Dante Cicchetti, Vicki K. Carlson. ISBN 0521379695 (0-521-37969-5). Cambridge University Press.
- Cicchetti, D., & Cohen, D. J. (Eds.). (1995). Developmental psychopathology: Theory and method (Vol. 1). New York: Wiley.
- Cicchetti, D., & Cohen, D. J. (Eds.). (1995). Developmental psychopathology: Risk, disorder, and adaptation (Vol. 2). New York: Wiley.
