= Dawkins vs. Gould =

2001 book by Kim Sterelny

- First edition cover
- Author: Kim Sterelny
- Language: English
- Subject: Evolutionary biology, philosophy of biology
- Publisher: Icon Books
- Publication date: 2001
- Publication place: United States
- Media type: Print, e-book
- Pages: 205
- ISBN: 978-1-84046-780-2
- OCLC: 76936307

Dawkins vs. Gould: Survival of the Fittest is a book about the differing views of biologists Richard Dawkins and Stephen Jay Gould by philosopher of biology Kim Sterelny. When published in 2001, it became an international best-seller. A new edition was published in 2007 to include Gould's The Structure of Evolutionary Theory finished shortly before his death in 2002, and recent works by Dawkins. The synopsis below is from the 2007 publication.

== Synopsis ==
=== Part I—Battle Joined ===
In the introductory chapter the author points out that there have been many conflicts in biology. Still, few have been as public or as polemical as the one between Dawkins and Gould. Dawkins sees evolution as a competition between gene lineages, where organisms are vehicles for those genes. Gould, a palaeontologist in the tradition of George Gaylord Simpson, has a different perspective. For example, he sees chance as very important, and views organisms as being more important than genes. Their world views also differ, for instance they have very different beliefs about the relationship between religion and science.

=== Part II—Dawkins' World ===
This begins with a discussion on genes and gene lineages (chapter 2). Dawkins' view on evolution, as outlined in The Selfish Gene, has genes as the units of selection, both in the first replicators and in more complex organisms, where alliances of genes are formed (and sometimes broken). He then discusses in chapter 3, Dawkins' view of heritability, with genes as difference makers that satisfy replicator principles and have phenotypic power, increasing the likelihood of phenotypic expression, depending on environmental context. In chapter 4, he discusses aspects of genomes and genetic replication, using various examples. He notes that in a story about magpie aggression, "Dawkins' story will be about genes and vehicles", whereas Gould and others will describe it in terms of phenotypic fitness. (p. 39) He discusses ways in which genes "lever their way into the next generation", including genes that are loners, or 'Outlaws', and which promote their own replication at the expense of other genes in their organism's genome. He then discusses the role of extended phenotypes, in which genotypes that influence their environment further increase the likelihood of replication (chapter 4). Chapter 5 explores selfish genes and the selection within the animal kingdom of co-operation as opposed to altruism, levels of selection, and the evolution of evolvability itself. Sterelny notes that on the issue of high-level selection, "Dawkins and Gould are less sharp than they once were." (p. 65)

In chapter 6, Sterelny notes that "despite the heat of some recent rhetoric, the same is true of the role of selection in generating evolutionary change", (p. 67) and naive adaptationism. "Everyone accepts that many characteristics of organisms are not the direct result of selection", as in the example of redness of blood, which is a by-product of its oxygen-carrying properties. (p. 70) Numerous general truths are uncontroversial "though their application to particular cases may be. Nor is there disagreement between Gould and Dawkins on core cases", such as echolocation in bats, which "everyone agrees is an adaptation". (p. 71) They do however differ on the relative role of selection and variation. For example, they have different emphases on development. Developmental constraints are fundamental to Gould's approach. Dawkins gives this less weight, and has been more interested in enhanced possibilities open to lineages as a result of developmental revolutions. For example, the evolution of segmentation increases variation possibilities. He discusses this in Climbing Mount Improbable, and "returns to similar themes at the end of The Ancestor's Tale: major transitions in evolution are developmental transitions, transitions that make new variants possible, and hence new adaptive complexes possible". (pp. 77–78)

"Gould, on the other hand, is inclined to bet that the array of possibilities open to a lineage is tightly restricted, often to minor variants of its current state." (p. 78) Gould sees morphological stability as "probably explained by constraints on the supply of variation to selection". (p. 78) But whereas in his earlier work Gould considered variation supply as a brake on evolutionary change, in The Structure of Evolutionary Theory he carefully notes that it can also enhance possibilities for change. "So while both Dawkins and Gould recognise the central role of developmental biology in an explanation of evolutionary change, they make different bets as to what the role will be. Gould but not Dawkins thinks that one of these roles is as a brake", damping down change possibilities. (p. 78) Another difference is Dawkins conception of evolutionary biology's central problem as the explanation of adaptive complexity, whereas Gould has largely focused on the existence of large-scale patterns in the history of life that are not explained by natural selection. "A further disagreement concerns the existence and importance of these patterns", (p. 79) which leads on to Part III.

=== Part III—The View from Harvard (Gould) ===
In discussing Gould's perspective, Sterelny begins with two fundamental distinctions that Gould saw between his viewpoint and that of the Dawkins camp. Firstly, Gould thought that gene selectionists misrepresent the role of genes in microevolution, ascribing a causal role in evolution, rather than by-product record of evolutionary change. Moreover, evolutionary biologists have often neglected non-selective possibilities when formulating hypotheses about microevolutionary change. For example, contemporary sex differences in human males and females need not be adaptations, but could be evolutionary vestiges of a greater sexual dimorphism in ancestral species.

But Gould's main target is 'extrapolationism', concerning the relationship between evolutionary processes occurring within species and those of large-scale life histories. In this view, the evolution of species lineages is an aggregate of events at the local population scale, with major changes being the additive result of minor changes over successive generations. While not disputing the relevance of this, Gould argued that it is not the whole truth. "Indeed, it is not much of an exaggeration to say that Gould's professional life has been one long campaign against the idea that this history of life is nothing but the long, long accumulation of local events." (p. 86) Sterelny offers four highlights to illustrate this.

Firstly, punctuated equilibrium, in which new species arise by a split in a parental species, followed by geologically rapid speciation of one or both of the fragments. A period of stasis then occurs until the species either becomes extinct or splits again. Gould argued that punctuated equilibrium challenges the gradual change expected by extrapolationists. In the case of Hominid evolution, there is the evolutionary trend of marked increase in brain size. To Gould, this trend was the result of species sorting, in which species with relatively larger brains were more likely to appear, or to survive.

Secondly, in his Natural History writings, Gould often argued that the history of life was profoundly affected by mass extinctions caused by environmental catastrophes such as an asteroid impact causing the Cretaceous–Paleogene extinction event, which wiped out pterosaurs, large marine reptiles and non-avian dinosaurs 66 million years ago. Such a mass extinction would be sudden at not just the larger geological time-scale, but also the more ephemeral ecological one. "The properties that are visible to selection and evolution in local populations—the extent to which an organism is suited to life here and now" become irrelevant to survival prospects in mass extinction times. "Survival or extinction in mass extinction episodes determines the large-scale shape of the tree of life". Massive culling of synapsids at the end of the Permian "gave the dinosaurs their chance. The death of the dinosaurs opened the door for the radiation of mammals." (p. 89)

Thirdly, in Wonderful Life, Gould describes the Burgess Shale fauna, which is known in detail due to fortuitous preservation of both hard and soft tissue around 505 million years ago. Gould argues that the Burgess Shale fauna demonstrate both diversity of species and disparity of body plans. He accepts that diversity has probably increased over the last few million years, but argues that disparity of animal life peaked early in evolutionary history, with very little disparity generated since the Cambrian, and profound conservatism in surviving lineages. For example, despite diversity in beetle species their body plans follow the same general pattern. He argues that survival has been contingent, and that if the tape of life was replayed from the earliest Cambrian, with small alterations in the initial conditions, a different set of survivors may have evolved.

Fourth, in The Spread of Excellence, "Gould argues that evolutionary trends are not the scaled-up consequences of competitive interactions among organisms." (p. 90) For example, morphological changes in horses are not the cumulative result of the competitive success of horses better adapted to grazing. "Rather, Gould argues that this trend is really a change in the spread of variation within the horse lineage", which used to be species rich with a wide range of lifestyles and sizes. "But only a very few species survived, and those few happen to be largish horses. The average horse is larger now only because almost all horse species became extinct, and the few survivors happened to be somewhat atypical", and there is no evolutionary 'trend' towards increased size. (p. 91) Similarly with complexity. While complexity has increased over time, it is misleading to see this simply as a trend towards increased complexity, from simple organisms such as bacteria to complex organisms such as us. Rather, the distance from the least to the most complex living organism has increased. "The real phenomenon to be explained is this increase in variation rather than an upward trend in average complexity. There is, Gould argues, no such trend." (p. 92)

Sterelny notes two issues arising from consideration of Gould's case against extrapolationism. "Are the patterns in life's history that he claims to detect real? And do these patterns really show the existence of evolutionary mechanisms other than those operating at the scale of local populations?" (p. 92)

Sterelny then outlines in chapter 8 Gould and Eldredge's punctuated equilibrium hypothesis. They argued that the appearance of stability in species evolution is not a mere effect of the gappiness and imperfection of the fossil record. Rather, it is the result of discontinuous tempos of change in the process of speciation and the deployment of species in geological time. Sterelny notes that this hypothesis has been misunderstood in two important ways. First, in some early discussions of the idea, the contrast between geological and ecological time was blurred, with Gould and Eldredge interpreted as claiming that species originate more or less overnight in a single step. However, Gould and Eldredge were referring to geological time, in which speciation taking 50,000 years would seem instantaneous relative to a species existence over millions of years. A second misunderstanding relates to further evolutionary change following speciation. They are not claiming that there is no generational change at all. "Lineages do change. But the change between generations does not accumulate. Instead, over time, the species wobbles about its phenotypic mean. Jonathan Weiner's The Beak of the Finch describes this very process." (p. 96) Sterelny notes that despite the fact that the fossil record represents, for several reasons, a biased sample, "the consensus seems to be shifting Gould's way: the punctuated equilibrium pattern is common, perhaps even predominant". Yet even if stasis is common "why suppose that this is bad news for the extrapolationist orthodoxy?" (p. 97) He notes that "the problem is not stasis but speciation. How can events in a local population generate a new species?" (p. 98) In discussing this issue, he notes "any solution to the speciation problem will take us beyond events in local populations observable on human timescales", and "it is likely that whatever explains the occasional transformation of a population into a species will rely on large-scale but rare climatic, biological, geographic or geological events; events which isolate populations until local change is entrenched". (p. 99)^{[a]} He notes that speciation is not just the accumulation of events in a local population, but dependent on the population's embeddedness into a larger whole. "There is a break with a strong version of extrapolationism, but it is not a radical break. Dawkins could, should, and probably would accept it; in The Ancestor's Tale, he has an inclusive view of speciation mechanisms." (p. 100) Thus, while "Gould somewhat overstates the adherence of orthodoxy to strict extrapolationism", punctuated equilibrium is more important than some of the more "ungenerous treatment" that has been meted out. (pp. 100–101)

In chapter 9, Sterelny discusses mass extinction, and notes Gould's hypothesis that mass extinctions are more frequent, rapid, intense and different in their effects than has been supposed. (p. 108) Moreover, Gould argues that during such extinctions, there are evolutionary principles that would enable the prediction of winners and losers. "The game has rules. But they are different rules from those of normal times ... Species survival is not random, but the properties on which survival depends are not adaptations to the danger mass extinction threatens. If a meteor impact caused a nuclear winter, then the ability to lie dormant would have improved your chances. But dormancy is not an adaptation to the danger of meteor impacts." (p. 110) Similarly, "species with broad geographical ranges, species with broad habitat tolerances, species whose lifecycle does not tie them too closely to a particular type of community all would have had a better chance of making it", (p. 110) and this amounts to species selection. However, as Gould concedes, there are no well-worked-out case studies. "In short, Gould's case for the importance of mass extinction depends on the view that there is a qualitative difference between mass extinction and background extinction, and that major groups have disappeared that would otherwise have survived". (p. 113) A plausible but difficult to prove claim, as is the claim that mass extinction regimes are species selection regimes.

In chapter 10, Sterelny discusses the fossil evidence of Cambrian fauna, and how this provides the basis for Gould's challenge to gradualistic orthodoxy. About 543 million years ago, at the base of the Cambrian, the Ediacaran fauna, characterised by small shelly fossils, fossilised tracks, and burrows, apparently disappeared. From available evidence, diversity of fauna was very limited at the beginning of the Cambrian Period. "By the middle of the Cambrian, about 520 million years ago, animal life was rich and diverse", (p. 116) as demonstrated by the Maotianshan Shales fossils, in Chengjiang, China, which "are as spectacular as the Burgess Shale fauna, and significantly older." (p. 116) "Thus the fossil record seems to show that most of the major animal groups appeared simultaneously. In the 'Cambrian explosion', we find segmented worms, velvet worms, starfish and their allies, molluscs (bivalves, snails, squid and their relatives), sponges, brachiopods and other shelled animals appearing all at once, with their basic organisation, organ systems and sensory mechanisms already operational." (p. 116) "This explosive evolutionary radiation of the Cambrian seems to be unique. Plants seem to have arisen somewhat more gradually ... nor was there a similar radiation when animals invaded the land ... the colonisation of the land saw no new ways of making an animal." (p. 117) Despite adaptations, the basic body plans remain recognisable. One possibility is that the 'Cambrian explosion' is "an illusion generated by the failure of earlier Precambrian fossils to survive to our times," (p. 117) that there is a long history of hidden evolution preceding the appearance of multi-celled animals in the fossil record. "This remains a live option. There are fossil embryos of animals from China dating to about 570 million years ago", (p. 120) and there are many animal lineages for which there is no fossil record, possibly due to being small and soft-bodied, so leaving no detectable traces. Certainly Precambrian animal life is evidenced by the Ediacaran fossils, but the relationship between fauna from these two periods remains unclear. Gould was inclined to support the view that the Ediacaran fauna became wholly extinct prior to the Cambrian, thus were not Cambrian ancestors, "hence their existence does not extend the timeframe of animal evolution into the Precambrian". (p. 120)

However, the development of methods of calibrating rates of change in DNA sequences has given the ability to estimate the last common ancestor of various lineages. It also allows the obtaining of molecular clock dates for lineages without a fossil record, which shows that zero-fossil phyla are also ancient. Such information comes with important caveats in relation to methodology, including the underlying assumptions of each method. "However, even the youngest dates from molecular clocks place the origins of the deepest branches in the tree of animal life—where the sponges and jellyfish branch off from the other early animals—over 600 million years ago, and so quite deep in the Precambrian." (p. 125) Gould accepted this, but noted that this does not negate the Cambrian Explosion. Molecular clocks date origins, while fossils date geographical spread and morphology. Molecular clock data cannot decide between gradual morphological change and rapid evolutionary bursts after initial species divergence. "Moreover, Gould argues that the fossil record supports the model in which the lineage splits much earlier than the distinctive morphologies evolve. For that explains why we find no Precambrian proto-arthropod fossils. In short, the 'hidden history' hypothesis remains an open option, but so does Gould's guess that the Cambrian explosion was genuinely explosive rather than an illusion generated by incomplete preservation." (pp. 125–126)

Of relevance to the explosive radiation hypothesis are the findings from the Cambrian sites: the Burgess (~505 myr), the Chengjiang (~522 myr), and the Sirius Passet formation in Greenland, which is dated at about 518 million years Before Present. Sterelny describes the distinction between disparity and diversity, and then explores Gould's claim that since the Cambrian, diversity has increased, but disparity has decreased. Since the Cambrian, not just species within phyla, but whole phyla themselves have become extinct. The major subdivisions of animal life are phyla, each of which is a distinctive way of building an animal. Gould's claim is that "the Cambrian phylum count was larger, maybe much larger, than the contemporary count. No new phyla have appeared, and many have gone. That count, in turn, is a reasonable measure of disparity. So Cambrian disparity was considerably larger than current disparity. The history of animal life is not a history of gradually increasing differentiation. It is a history of exuberant initial proliferation followed by much loss; perhaps sudden loss." (p. 129) Gould doubted that selection played much role in either the early burst of disparity, the post-Cambrian conservativeness of evolution, or the roster of loss and survival.

To Gould, there is a conservative pattern of history indicated by a reduction in disparity as measured by both the lack of new body plans and the lack of any major modifications of old ones. Given that evolution in general has not ceased in the past 500 million years, this poses a number of questions. However, Dawkins and more so his former student Mark Ridley think Gould's basic claim about history's pattern is incorrect. Central to Ridley's approach is cladistics, in which the purpose of biological systematics is to discover and represent genealogical relationships between species. Biological classifications are thus evolutionary genealogies, where only monophyletic groups (e.g. genera, families, orders, classes, phyla) are recognised and named. To cladists, similarity and dissimilarity are not objective features of the living world; they are products of human perceptions. Thus, whereas some morphological and physiological differences are more salient to us, and more striking or surprising, this is a fact about us, not the history of life. Conversely, genealogical reconstructions—who is related to whom—are objective facts independent of the observer's perception. Sterelny discusses how both cladists and Dawkins think that Gould overestimates Cambrian disparity, and he notes that while the distinction between disparity and diversity is very plausible, in the absence of a good account of the nature of disparity, and objective measures, "the existence of Gould's puzzling pattern remains conjectural". (p. 141)

Finally, in chapter 11, Sterelny discusses the "evolutionary escalator", or the tendency over time for life on earth to show a progressive increase both in complexity and adaptivity. While Gould does not outright reject this, he thinks it is a misleading way to think about the history of life. As above, with the example of horses, Gould argues that there has been no directional trend, but rather, a massive extinction in the horse lineage, with the surviving remnants happening to be largish grazers. So the appearance of a trend is generated by a reduction in heterogeneity. "A trend which is hostage to one switch between life and death is no trend at all." (p. 146) At the scale of complexity, the same applies. "What we think of as a progressive increase in complexity is a change in the difference between the least and the most complex organism. It is a change in the spread of complexity." (p. 146) Life starts in the simplest form that the constraints of chemistry and physics will allow, with bacteria probably close to that limit. "So life starts at the minimum level of complexity. Since even now nearly everything that is alive is a bacterium, for the most part life has stayed that way." (p. 146) But occasionally life builds a lineage that becomes more complex over time. There are no global evolutionary mechanisms that either prevent more complex organisms evolving from simpler ones, or that make it more likely to occur. Complexity tends to drift up because the point of life's origin is close to the physical lower bound. Such complex creatures are relatively less than bacteria, which still dominate life, but the difference between the simplest and most complex organisms tends to become greater over time. So the increased range is wholly undirected. Displayed as a frequency distribution curve or histogram, the shape would be skewed to the right (i.e. positively skewed), with the mode near the left. Over time, the range would increase as average complexity drifts upwards. But the mode would remain at left, with the curve spreading to the right, because there is a wall imposed by the laws of the physical sciences to the left, but not to the right.

To Gould, this upward drift in complexity is not the same as directional progress. 'Replaying the tape' of life's history would not guarantee the same outcomes, especially as mass extinction events make history utterly unpredictable. Conversely, Dawkins and Simon Conway Morris think that the course of evolutionary history is more predictable than does Gould. They argue that "convergent evolution is such a ubiquitous feature of evolution that the broad outline of evolution is highly predictable. Evolutionary pathways are constrained by both opportunity and possibility. There are not many ways of building working organisms, and so we can predict that evolution will move along this small set of pathways. Many of the most distinctive features of living systems have evolved more than once. Some of them (like eyes) have evolved many times." (p. 149) Also, Dawkins thinks that evolution is progressive, not in an anthropocentric sense, but because over time life is becoming better adapted, although not in every aspect, as when local conditions change and organisms must move or readapt. "There is no reason to suppose that there is any arrow of overall improvement here." (p. 150)

However, Dawkins thinks that relationships between organisms and their enemies, such as predator-prey, or parasite-host relationships, are locked into a permanent arms race, and such lineages generate progressive change. "Both predator and prey will become absolutely more efficient in hunting and avoiding hunters, though their relative success with respect to one another may not change at all over time." (p. 151) Thus progress is real though partial and intermittent. "Partial because it is generated only when selective regimes are both directional and stable: selecting for the same kind of phenotypic change over long periods, as in arms races ... intermittent because every arms race will ultimately be disrupted by large-scale environmental changes." (p. 151) However, while they were in progress, each lineage was objectively improving.

To Sterelny, Gould overstates his case, and "there is more to the history of life's complexity than a gradual increase in variance". (p. 151) He cites the 1995 work The Major Transitions in Evolution by John Maynard Smith and Eörs Szathmáry, in which life's history involves a series of major transitions and hence inherent directionality, with each transition facilitating possibilities for the evolution of more complex organisms. Dawkins pursues a similar, though less detailed, argument* in discussing the evolution of evolvability, in which a series of 'watershed events' make new life forms possible. These watersheds in evolvability comprise the evolution of sex, of multi-celled life together with a life cycle that takes large organisms through a single-celled reproduction stage, and the evolution of a modular mode of the development and construction of bodies. "Segmentation, for Dawkins, is a special case of modularity; of building a creature out of relatively discrete chunks. For once a chunk has been invented by evolution, it can be modified or redeployed without stuffing up the rest of the organism." (p. 152)

While Gould too is interested in evolvability, the crucial difference between Gould's view, and that of Maynard Smith, Szathmary and Dawkins, is in how they see the spread of complexity. To Gould, complexity drifts upward, having a lower boundary or wall to the left, "but no upper bound, and these features of complexity are fixed by biochemistry, not the course of evolutionary history". (p. 153) Maynard Smith and Szathmary consider that evolutionary history has had upper bounds, or walls to the right. For example, until eukaryotic life evolved, there was an upper bound of complexity set by the intrinsic limits on the size and structural complexity of prokaryotes, and for "perhaps 2 billion years, bacterial evolution was confined between these two limits." (p. 153) Similarly, until a series of evolutionary innovations facilitated the evolution of multi-celled organisms, eukaryotic complexity was set by the limits on a single eukaryotic cell. "Maynard Smith and Szathmary argue that social existence, too, has evolutionary preconditions. Until these are met, a wall remains to the right." (p. 153) Whereas to Gould, there are unchanging boundaries set by physics and chemistry, Maynard Smith, Szathmary and Dawkins view evolution as irreversibly transforming these boundaries. "The eukaryotic cell, sexual reproduction and cellular differentiation all change the nature of evolutionary possibility. These possibilities have changed over time in a direction that increases the maximum attainable complexity. In short, over time the rules of evolution change." (pp. 153–154) So evolvability has changed, with developmental mechanisms determining the variation available to selection. Gould claims that bacteria dominate every age, including this one.* They are the world's most numerous organisms, have the most disparate metabolic pathways, and may constitute most of the world's biomass. "All this is true and important", with Dawkins making similar observations.* "But it is not the whole truth. We live in an age in which many biological structures are now possible that were once not possible. That too is true, and important." (p. 153)

=== Part IV—The State of Play ===
In Chapter 12, Sterelny notes that "Dawkins and his allies really do have a different conception of evolution from that embraced by Eldredge, Lewontin and other collaborators of Gould", but that this does not explain the undercurrent of hostility generated in the debate, as illustrated by a series of exchanges in the New York Review of Books. But the issues pertain mostly to matters internal to evolutionary theory, and apart from banal psychological explanations pertaining to human reaction to public criticism, Sterelny thinks that at core is their different attitudes to science itself. To Dawkins, science is not just a light in the dark, but "by far our best, and perhaps our only, light." (p. 158) While not infallible, the natural sciences are society's one great engine for producing objective knowledge about the world, not just one knowledge system among many, and certainly not a socially constructed reflection of contemporary dominant ideology. Dawkins accepts that science cannot say what we should accept and reject, "but does not think of values as a special kind of fact that can be studied non-scientifically", notwithstanding that values are a kind of fact that anthropologists can and do study. "Least of all does he think religion has any special authority on values." (p. 158)

Gould's perspective is more ambiguous, in which some important questions are outside the scope of science, falling into the domain of religion. "On this issue, Dawkins' views are simple. He is an atheist. Theisms of all varieties are just bad ideas about how the world works, and science can prove that those ideas are bad. What is worse, as he sees it, these bad ideas have mostly had socially unfortunate consequences." (pp. 158–159) In contrast, Gould thought theism is irrelevant to religion. "He interprets religion as a system of moral belief. Its essential feature is that it makes moral claims on how we ought to live. In Gould's view, science is irrelevant to moral claims. Science and religion are concerned with independent domains." (p. 159) Sterelny considers Gould's views on religion "doubly strange". (p. 159) First, various religions make innumerable factual claims about the history of the world and how it works, and those claims are often the basis of moral injunctions. Second, Gould's conception of ethics seems strange. "Does he think that there are genuine ethical truths? Is there genuine moral knowledge?" (p. 159) Recent ethical thinking has two approaches to this question, with perhaps the main contemporary argument being the 'expressivist' view that moral claims express the speaker's attitude towards some act or individual. In this view "when, for instance, I call someone a scumbag, I do not describe a particular moral property of that person. Rather, I express my distaste for that person and their doings." (pp. 159–160) The main alternative is 'naturalism', in which moral claims are based on facts, albeit complex, about human welfare. Gould seems to deny both options. "If 'expressivism' is right, there is no independent domain of moral knowledge to which religion contributes", with moral utterances reflecting not objective features of the world, but attitudes and opinions of the speakers. Conversely, "if naturalism is right, science is central to morality. For it discovers conditions under which we prosper." (p. 159)

Gould thinks that there are important domains of human understanding where science has no role, and moreover he is sceptical about science's role within its 'proper' domain. Nevertheless, he rejects extreme versions of postmodern relativism. Evolution is an objective fact, containing objective facts, and those facts are not just aspects of a Western creation myth reflecting the dominant ideology, or an element of the current palaeontological paradigm. "So to some extent^{[b]} Gould shares with Dawkins the view that science delivers objective knowledge about the world as it is." (p. 161) But while science reflects objective evidence and is not a mere socio-cultural construction "Gould argues that science is very deeply influenced by the cultural and social matrix in which it develops", (p. 161) with many of his writings^{[c]} illustrating the influence of social context on science, and its ultimate sensitivity to evidence. These writings "began as reflections on natural history; they ended as reflections on the history of natural history". (p. 161) Gould's Time's Arrow, Time's Cycle (first published in 1987) "locates the development of our conception of deep history in its cultural and intellectual context without any suggestion that that cultural context perverted the development of geology", whereas "in Wonderful Life, Gould argued that the Burgess Shale fauna were misunderstood because they were interpreted through the ideology of their discoverer". (p. 162) The Mismeasure of Man is Gould's most famous work on the themes of socio-cultural interests leading to bad science, pseudo-science, racist and sexist science, where "a particular ideological context led to a warped and distorted appreciation of the evidence on human difference". (p. 162)

Thus, "one sharp contrast between Dawkins and Gould is on the application of science in general, and evolutionary biology in particular, to our species". (p. 162) Yet paradoxically, Dawkins' most systematic writings on human evolution explore the differences between human evolution and that of most other organisms, in which humans pass on their values through ideas and skills which Dawkins calls memes. To Dawkins, ideas are often like pathogens or parasites, replicating throughout human populations, sometimes quite virulently, with evangelical religion being a salient example^{[d]}. Doubts about the reliability and accuracy of idea replication suggest Dawkins' own view of cultural evolution may not work. But his general approach has gained some popularity, as illustrated by works which explore the interaction between cultural and biological evolution, such as Peter Richerson and Robert Boyd's Not By Genes Alone, as well as Eytan Avital and Eva Jablonka's Animal Traditions. "So though Dawkins approaches human behaviour using different tools to those of standard sociobiologists and evolutionary psychologists, he is fully committed to the idea that we can understand ourselves only in an evolutionary framework." (pp. 164–165) This contrasts with Gould. While "Of course" he accepts that humans are an evolved species, "Everything that Gould does not like in contemporary evolutionary thinking comes together in human sociobiology and its descendant, evolutionary psychology. The result has been a twenty-year campaign of savage polemic against evolutionary theories of human behaviour. Gould hates sociobiology". And "It is true that some evolutionary psychology does seem simple-minded," such as Randy Thornhill's "unconvincing" attempt to argue that a tendency towards rape is an evolutionary adaptation. (p. 165) However, contemporary evolutionary psychologists, and especially biological anthropologists, have accepted the need for caution in testing adaptationist hypotheses. (p. 165) However, even the most disciplined sociobiological approaches reflect different approaches to evolution to that exemplified by Gould. They "tend not to emphasise the importance of development and history in imposing constraints on adaptation, the problems in translating microevolutionary change into species-level change, the role of contingency and mass extinction in reshaping evolving lineages, or the importance of paleobiology to evolutionary biology", (p. 166) which likely played a part in Gould's hostility. But Sterelny suspects more most of all, Gould thought "these ideas are dangerous and ill-motivated as well as wrong. They smack of hubris, of science moving beyond its proper domain, and incautiously at that". Conversely, to Dawkins, knowledge of evolutionary underpinnings to human behaviour is potentially liberating, and "might even help us to escape the poisoned chalice of religion". (p. 166)

Finally, in chapter 13, Sterelny summarises the fundamental contrasts between the views of Dawkins and Gould. In Dawkins' argument, selection acts on lineages of replicators, which are mostly but not exclusively genes. Ideas and skills are the replicators in animals capable of social learning, and "the earliest replicators were certainly not genes". (p. 167) Genetic competition occurs through vehicle-building alliances, with selection dependent on repeatable influences on those vehicles. Other genetic replication strategies include Outlaws, the prospects of which are enhanced at the expense of vehicle adaptiveness. And extended phenotype genes advantageously enhance their environment. The vehicles of Dawkins replicators need not be individuals, but can also be groups, although animal co-operation is not sufficient to claim group selection. Evolution's central explanatory imperative is the existence of complex adaptation, which can only be explained by natural selection. This complex adaptation evolves gradually, with occasional replication errors resulting in large but survivable phenotypic change. Humans are unusual species in that they are vehicles for memes as well as genes, although humans are not exempt from evolutionary biological explanations. Extrapolationism is a sound working theory, with most evolutionary patterns the result of microevolutionary change over vast geological time. Major animal lineages are the result of ordinary speciation processes, although possibility-expanding changes may result in some form of lineage-level selection.

In contrast, Gould sees selection as usually acting on organisms in a local population, although in theory and practice, it can occur at many levels, with change at one level often affecting future options at other levels. Selection can occur at the group level, with some species lineages having characteristics which make extinction less likely, or speciation more likely. And while rare, selection can occur on genes within an organism. While selection is important, and requires understanding, it is just one of many factors explaining microevolutionary events and macroevolutionary patterns. Further, complex adaptations are but one phenomenon explanations in evolutionary biology. Extrapolationism is not a good theory, with large-scale patterns in the history of life not explainable by extrapolating from measurable events in local populations. Evolutionary biology needs a theory of variation, explaining the effect of variation supply on change potentiality. While humans are evolved animals, attempts to explain human behaviour using techniques from evolutionary biology have largely failed, "vitiated by one-sided understanding of evolutionary biology. They have often been biologically naive." (p. 170)

Sterelny notes that these debates remain alive and developing, with no final adjudication possible as yet. "But we can say something about how the argument has developed." (p. 170) He claims that "the idea that gene-selectionist views of evolution are tacitly dependent on reductionism and genetic determinism is a mistake. Dawkins and the other gene selectionists do not think that nothing happens in evolution but changes in gene frequency." (p. 170) They do not deny the significance of the organism or phenotype, which they see as vehicles of selection, or 'survival machines', which interact with other survival machines and with the environment in ways replication of the genes whose vehicles they are. But there are other replication-enhancing strategies apart from organism construction. Extended phenotypes, as exemplified by parasitic species, are common and important, with probably all parasitic gene pools including "genes whose adaptive effects are on host organisms." (p. 171) And "the outlaw count is unknown, but it is growing all the time", and may transpire to be more common than thought.

Sterelny notes that "gene selectionism is not determinism. No gene selectionist thinks that there is typically a simple relationship between carrying a particular gene and having a particular phenotype". While they exist, such as the sickle-cell haemoglobin gene, they are the exception not the rule. Gene-selectionist ideas are compatible with context dependence of gene action, but they do assume some reasonable regular relationship between a specific gene in an organism's genotype, and some aspect of the organism's phenotypic expression. They assume that within gene lineages, the effect on their vehicles will be fairly similar. "So while gene selectionists are not genetic determinists, they are making a bet on developmental biology. When revitalised to reoccurring features of context, gene action will turn out to be fairly systematic. There is no reason to suppose that this hunch is false, but it is not known to be true." (p. 172)

Developmental biology is relevant to this debate in another important way: "The role of selection in evolution. Gould is betting that when the facts of developmental biology are in, it will turn out that the evolutionary possibilities of most lineages are highly constrained", with some characteristics "frozen" into their respective lineages. "They are developmentally entrenched. That is, these basic organisational features are connected in development to most aspects of the organism's phenotype, and that makes them hard to change." (p. 172) And "since variation in these frozen-in features is unlikely, selection is not likely to be important in explaining their persistence", (p. 173) and Gould thinks 'frozen accidents' are important in explanations of evolutionary patterns found in the fossil record. Conversely, Dawkins thinks that over time, selection can alter the range of a lineage's evolutionary possibilities. "So he thinks both that selection has a larger range of variation with which to work, and that when patterns do exist over long periods ... selection will have played a stabilising role." (p. 173) The integration of evolution and development "is the hottest of hot topics in contemporary evolutionary theory, and this issue is still most certainly open". In discussing the effects of mutations, Sterelny's "best current guess is that developmental biology probably does generate biases in the variation that is available to selection, and hence that evolutionary trajectories will often depend both on selection and these biases in supply" (173), vindicating Gould's view that developmental biology is crucial to explaining evolutionary patterns. (p. 174)

"But it is harder to see how to resolve some of Gould's other claims about the large-scale history of life. Despite the plausibility of the distinction between disparity and diversity, we are not close to constructing a good account of disparity and its measurement". (p. 174) Further, convergent evolution belies the unpredictability that Gould supposes. However, "most examples of convergence are not independent of evolutionary experiments. For they concern lineages with an enormous amount of shared history, and hence shared developmental potential", as in "the standard example of streamlining in marine reptiles, sharks, pelagic bony fish like the tuna, and dolphins". (p. 175) Further, "the scale is not large enough. The fact that eyes have often evolved does not show that had, say, the earliest chordates succumbed to a bit of bad luck (and become extinct), then vertebrate-like organisms would have evolved again." (p. 175) Moreover, Gould's main concern is not with adaptive complexes, which are the source of the above, oft-cited examples, "but with body plans—basic ways of assembling organisms." Sterelny thinks that "we have to score Gould's contingency claims as: 'Don't know; and at this stage don't know how to find out'". (p. 175)

Gould seems right that mass extinctions played a role in shaping evolutionary history, and "is probably right that extinction works by different rules in mass extinction regimes". (p. 176) Some ideas are difficult to assess, such as whether mass extinctions filter out the features of species or of individuals comprising species. It is also difficult to tell how fundamental is the disagreement between Gould and Dawkins on this. But Sterelny's bet is that Gould may be right in thinking that survival or extinction in mass extinction depends on species properties. "However, it has proved hard to find really clear, empirically well-founded examples to back up this hunch." (p. 176) It was once thought that sexual reproduction was maintained by species selection, which Sterelny outlines. He notes however that "this idea has recently fallen on hard times", with new individual-based ideas being developed. Further, species-level maintenance of sexual reproduction "has a problem: sex does not always promote evolvability", breaking up as well as creating advantageous gene combinations. (p. 177)

"So it has been hard to find really convincing examples of species-level properties that are built by species-level selection. The problem is to find: (i) traits that are aspects of species, not the organisms making up the species; (ii) traits that are relevant to extinction and survival; and (iii) traits that are transmitted to daughter species, granddaughter species and so forth". And "transmission to daughter species is especially problematic". (p. 177) In the end, Sterelny states his own views are much closer to Dawkins than to Gould's, especially regarding microevolution—change within local populations. "But macroevolution is not just microevolution scaled up; Gould's paleontological perspective offers real insights into mass extinction and its consequences, and, perhaps, the nature of species and speciation". And Gould is considered right to expand the explanatory agenda of evolutionary biology to include large-scale patterns in life's history. "So, Dawkins is right about evolution on local scales, but maybe Gould is right about the relationship between events on a local scale, and those on the vast scale of paleontological time." (p. 178)

=== Suggested reading ===
The Suggested Reading section for each chapter is an extension of the chapter, aimed at pointing the reader in the direction of material that may assist their understanding of the issues under discussion.

This section of Sterelny's book contains, chapter by chapter, a comprehensive list of recommended reading, covering all of the main publications by Dawkins, Gould, and their respective proponents, along with many lesser-known publications by them, with accompanying commentary on either the authors, the publications, or both. Also, the readability of the various publications, and the relevance of the publications to the issues under discussion, as well as the relationship of the publications to each other, such as authors responding to each other through their publications, or supporting the stance of other authors, etc. He also tries to further clarify some points in the process.

== See also ==
- Evolutionary biology
- Philosophy of biology
- Philosophy of science
- Charles Darwin

== Notes ==
a. Sterelny cites the Milankovich cycles as one such isolating mechanism.

b. Italics in the quoted text.

c. Chiefly in his Natural History essays, which were published in the collected volumes of his popular science books.

d. In drawing on Viruses of the Mind, from Dawkins' book A Devil's Chaplain, Sterelny contrasts evangelical religions with non-evangelical ones such as Judaism, which he describes as "mostly a family affair", in which the religious views are primarily inherited socially from parents. (p. 164)
