= Developmental psychopathology =

Scientific study of the development and life course of mental disorders

Developmental psychopathology is the study of the development of psychological disorders (e.g., psychopathy, autism, schizophrenia and depression) with a life course perspective. Researchers who work from this perspective emphasize how psychopathology can be understood as normal development gone awry. Developmental psychopathology focuses on both typical and atypical child development in an effort to identify genetic, environmental, and parenting factors that may influence the longitudinal trajectory of psychological well-being.

== Theoretical basis ==
Developmental psychopathology is a sub-field of developmental psychology and child psychiatry characterized by the following (non-comprehensive) list of assumptions:

1. Atypical development and typical development are mutually informative. Therefore, developmental psychopathology is not the study of pathological development, but the study of the basic mechanisms that cause developmental pathways to diverge toward pathological or typical outcomes;
2. Development leads to either adaptive or maladaptive outcomes. However, development that is adaptive in one context may be maladaptive in another context, and vice versa;
3. Developmental change is influenced by many variables. Research designs in developmental psychopathology should incorporate multivariate designs to examine the mechanisms underlying development;
4. Development occurs within nested contexts (see Urie Bronfenbrenner);
5. This field requires that development arises from a dynamic interplay of physiological, genetic, social, cognitive, emotional, and cultural influences across time.

== Origins of the academic field ==
In 1974, Thomas M. Achenbach authored a book entitled, "Developmental Psychopathology", which laid the foundations for the discipline of Developmental psychopathology. The book was an outgrowth of his research on relations between development and psychopathology.

Dante Cicchetti is acknowledged to have played a pivotal role in defining and shaping the field of developmental psychopathology. While at Harvard University, Cicchetti began publishing on the development of conditions such as depression and borderline personality disorder, in addition to his own work on child maltreatment and mental retardation. In 1984, Cicchetti edited both a book and a special issue of Child Development on developmental psychopathology. In that special issue he himself wrote, "The emergence of developmental psychopathology".

These efforts launched developmental psychopathology, a subfield of developmental science. In 1989, nine volumes of the Rochester Symposium on Developmental Psychopathology were published, as was the first issue of the journal Development and Psychopathology.

== Homotypic and heterotypic continuity ==
One central concept of developmental psychopathology is homotypic and heterotypic continuity. Some children will develop different symptoms across development (heterotypic continuity), while others will develop similar types of problems (homotypic continuity). While homotypic continuity of emotional and behavioural problems tends to be the norm across development, the transitions between early childhood and late childhood, and between preadolescence and adolescence are associated with higher heterotypic continuity.

== Development of conduct problems ==
Gerald R. Patterson and colleagues take a functionalist view of conduct problems in line with a behavior analysis of child development. They have found considerable evidence that the improper use of reinforcement in childhood can lead to this form of pathology.

== See also ==
- Child psychopathology
- Psychopathology
- Child development for behavioral models of antisocial behavior
- Child psychiatry
- Management of domestic violence
- Social neuroscience
- Victimology
