= Journal for General Philosophy of Science =

- Front cover
- Discipline: Philosophy
- Language: mainly English
- Edited by: Helmut Pulte, Gregor Schiemann, Thomas Reydon

Publication details
- History: 1970–present
- Publisher: Springer Science+Business Media
- Frequency: Biannually (1970–2016), quarterly (2017–present)

Standard abbreviations
- ISO 4: J. Gen. Philos. Sci.

Indexing
- ISSN: 0925-4560 (print); 1572-8587 (web)
- OCLC no.: 300184504

Links
- Journal homepage; At Ruhr-Universität Bochum

The Journal for General Philosophy of Science (also Zeitschrift für allgemeine Wissenschaftstheorie) is an academic journal publishing contributions from all areas of philosophy of science and about all philosophical topics relevant to the sciences and the humanities. Particular interest is focused on the discussion of methodological aspects that contribute to our understanding of science in general, the interactions and interdependences between the natural sciences and the humanities, and the history of philosophy of science from antiquity to the 20th century.

For the most part, the publications are research articles. Smaller sections are devoted to discussions of current topics, reports on conferences, countries and special topics, as well as to book reviews.

The journal was founded by Alwin Diemer, Lutz Geldsetzer and Gert König. It first appeared in 1970 under the heading Zeitschrift für Allgemeine Wissenschaftstheorie / Journal for General Philosophy of Science with Franz Steiner Verlag, Wiesbaden. Since 1990, the Journal has been published under the present heading by Kluwer Academic Publishers (now: Springer Science+Business Media). Since 2017, the editors are Claus Beisbart (Universität Bern), Helmut Pulte (Ruhr-Universität Bochum) and Thomas Reydon (Leibniz Universität Hannover).

== See also ==
- List of philosophy journals
- Philosophy of Science
