= Developmental Science =

- Discipline: Developmental psychology, cognitive neuroscience
- Language: English
- Edited by: Heather Bortfeld, Michelle de Haan, Paul C. Quinn

Publication details
- History: 1998–present
- Publisher: Wiley-Blackwell
- Frequency: Bimonthly
- Impact factor: 5.131 (2020)

Standard abbreviations
- ISO 4: Dev. Sci.

Indexing
- ISSN: 1363-755X (print); 1467-7687 (web)
- LCCN: 98642559
- OCLC no.: 39883649

Links
- Journal homepage; Online access; Online archive

Developmental Science is a peer-reviewed scientific journal covering developmental psychology and developmental cognitive neuroscience that was established in 1998. The current editors are Charles A. Nelson, Michelle de Haan, and Paul C. Quinn.

Topics covered include:

- Clinical, computational, and comparative approaches to development
- Cognitive and social development
- Functional neuroimaging of the developing brain
- Developmental disorders

According to the Journal Citation Reports, the journal has a 2014 impact factor of 3.808.
