= Arthur P. Shimamura =

American psychologist (1954–2020)

- Born: June 26, 1954; Los Angeles, California
- Died: October 6, 2020 (aged 66); Kailua, Hawaii
- Education: University of Washington
- Scientific career
- Fields: Psychology
- Workplaces: University of California, Berkeley
- Thesis: Comprehending logographic and phonetic symbols in Japanese and English-speaking individuals (1982)

Arthur Paul Shimamura (June 26, 1954 – October 6, 2020) was a professor of psychology and faculty member of the Helen Wills Neuroscience Institute at the University of California, Berkeley. His research focused on the neural basis of human memory and cognition. He received his BA in experimental psychology from the University of California, Santa Barbara in 1977 and his PhD in cognitive psychology from the University of Washington in 1982. He was a post-doctoral fellow in the laboratory of Larry Squire, where he studied amnesic patients. In 1989, Shimamura began his professorship at UC Berkeley. He has published over 100 scientific articles and chapters, was a founding member of the Cognitive Neuroscience Society, and has been science advisor for the San Francisco Exploratorium science museum.

In 2008, Shimamura received a John Simon Guggenheim Memorial Foundation fellowship to explore links between art, mind, and brain. His book, Experiencing Art: In the Brain of the Beholder, explores the perceptual, conceptual, and emotional features that guide our encounters with art (e.g., paintings and photography). In 2013, Shimamura edited a volume, Psychocinematics: Exploring Cognition at the Movies, which introduces psychocinematics, the term he coined for scientific investigations of the psychological and biological features of film.

Shimamura's research explored other psychological phenomenon, such as visual illusions (The Mystery Spot), aging in UC Berkeley Professors, and emotions in facial expressions.

In 2017, he published Get SMART! Five Steps Toward a Healthy Brain, a self-help book that offers guidelines for healthy aging and lifelong learning.

== Theories ==
Shimamura developed a broad theoretical framework that integrates memory encoding, storage, and retrieval. Shimamura (2000) defined encoding in terms of dynamic filtering theory, which describes the role of the prefrontal cortex in metacognitive or executive control processes. The prefrontal cortex acts as a high-level gating or filtering mechanism that enhances goal-directed activations and inhibits irrelevant activations. This filtering mechanism guides executive control at various levels of processing, including selecting, maintaining, updating, and rerouting activations, thus allowing us to select relevant sights, sounds, and thoughts.

It has long been established that the medial temporal lobe (MTL) is critical for memory storage. In 2010, Shimamura proposed hierarchical relational binding theory, which offers a new interpretation of the role of the MTL in memory storage. It is proposed that regions within the MTL conform to a hierarchical network with the hippocampus at the top of the hierarchy. Bindings that occur at the level of the hippocampus particularly strengthen memories so that strong memories get even stronger, a principle called "superadditive". Hierarchical relational binding theory explains both neuroimaging and behavior findings previously attributed to the distinction between recollection and familiarity.

In 2011, Shimamura proposed a theory of episodic remembering called Cortical Binding of Relational Activity (or CoBRA), which defines the posterior parietal cortex (PPC) as a convergence zone that integrates or binds features of an episodic memory. Shimamura argues that this binding process is the final stage of memory consolidation such that through PPC binding, episodic memories become more fully represented and retrieved in the neocortex.

== Honors and awards ==
- John Simon Guggenheim Fellowship (2008)
- Fellow and charter member, Association for Psychological Science
- Distinguished Teaching Award, Division of Social Sciences, UC Berkeley
- Osher fellow and science advisor, San Francisco Exploratorium Science Museum
- Ranked 9th of most-cited psychologists ("Highest Impact Authors, 1986-1990," APS Observer, November 1992)
