= Dual representation (psychology) =

Representational insight is the ability to detect and mentally represent the relation between a symbol and its referent. Whether or not a child gains this insight depends on the similarity between the symbol and its referent, the level of information provided about the relationship between the symbol and the referent, and a child's prior experience with symbols. An essential part of representational insight is dual representation or the existence of multiple mental representations of a single symbolic entity. Judy DeLoache coined this term after conducting many studies in which young children would watch an experimenter hide a toy in a model room and were then asked to retrieve a similar, but larger toy from a larger room.

== Symbolic relations ==
A symbol is an "entity that someone intends to stand for something other than itself," making symbolic artifacts objects used to aid in communication. Representational insight is the ability to detect and mentally represent the relation between a symbol and its referent. Whether or not a child gains this insight depends on the similarity between the symbol and its referent, the level of information provided about the relationship between the symbol and the referent, and a child's prior experience with symbols. An essential part of representational insight is dual representation or the existence of multiple mental representations of a single symbolic entity.

== History ==
=== Original experiment ===
During a study, DeLoache had built a model of a room in her lab with the purpose of studying toddler memory. Groups of three-year-old and two-and-a-half-year-old toddlers watched as experimenters hid miniature toys in the model room and were then asked to retrieve the larger versions of the toys from the larger room. The three-year-olds performed the retrieval task very well; however, the two-and-a-half-year-olds did not. The younger children were failing to appreciate a relation between the model and the room. This realization led DeLoache to focus her research instead on symbolic understanding.

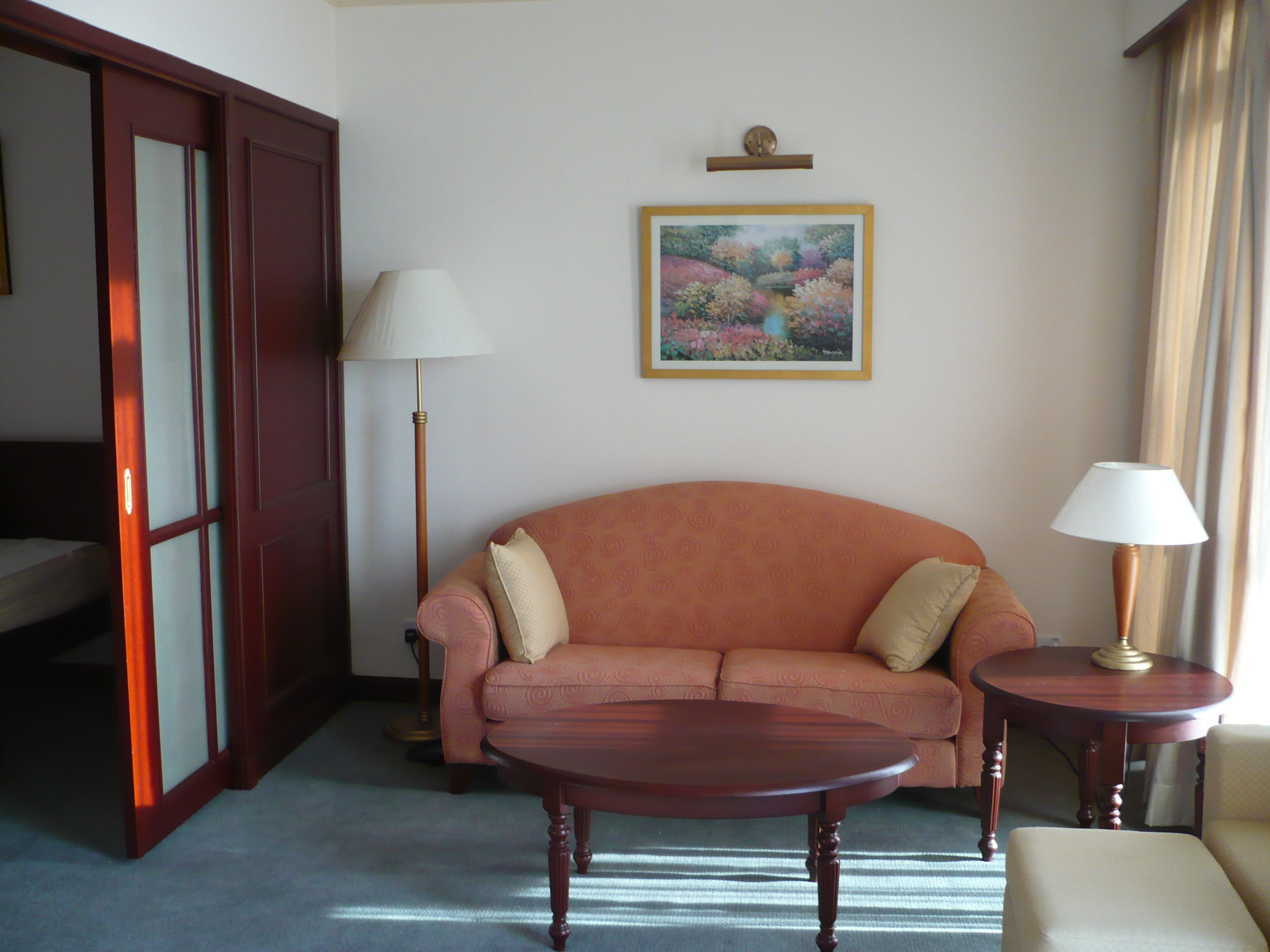
Living Room

The original concept of dual representation came about through research DeLoache was conducting on infants. Babies were shown pictures and were observed to manually explore them as if they were real objects, indicating that their perception is accurate but their representation is incorrect - meaning they did not understand the pictures were not real objects. As children get older, they acquire what DeLoache calls Dual Representation, in which they understand the symbolic meaning in an object. The first experiment conducted under Dual Representation began as a memory study in young children. DeLoache was studying toddler memory and was beginning a new experiment with two-and-a-half and three-year-old children using a model of a room in her lab. This real room was furnished like a standard living room and the model contained miniature versions of the items in the room. These items were the same shape and material and arranged in the same manner as they were in the real room. The children would watch an experimenter hide a toy in a model room and were asked to find a larger version of the toy in a larger room set up in the same way as the model- the scale model study. The results were very surprising – the children did very poorly which changed DeLoache's thinking, shifting her research from memory to what she calls dual representation.

== Other experiments ==
=== Babies with 2D pictures ===
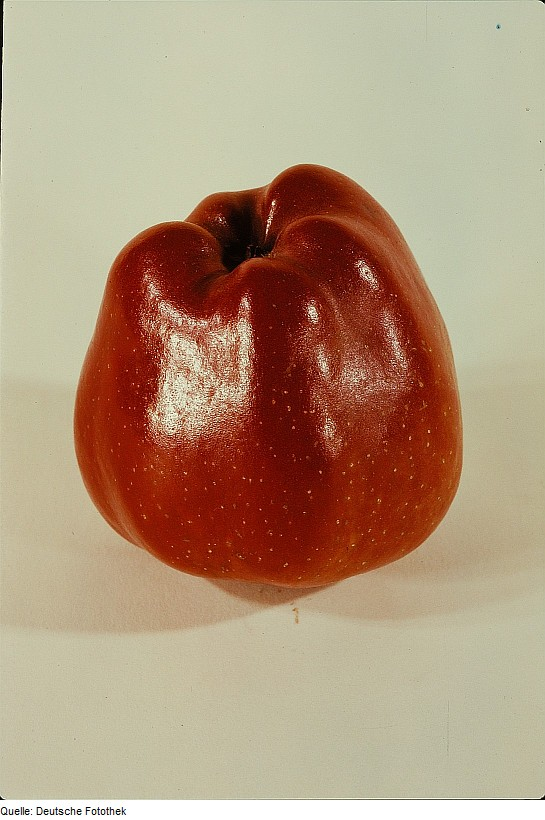
Fotothek df n-14 0000297

One of the first symbolic objects young children master is pictures. Though pictures are some of the simplest form of symbols for adults to comprehend, infants struggle with them and are observed to manually explore them. For example, when presented with a picture of a shoe, a toddler might try to fit his foot into the shoe depicted in the photograph. Babies have not achieved dual representation and lack the ability to mentally grasp the symbol as an object in addition to the object it represents. Judy DeLoache, David Uttal, Sophia, Pierroutsakos, and Karl Rosengren studied this by placing books containing very realistic color photographs in front of nine-month-old children. They found that every child in the study attempted to interact with the pictures as if they were the objects they represented, suggesting that symbolic thinking is not intuitive. This same behavior was observed when children were shown video as well. Babies are observed to understand the symbolic nature of pictures by the time they are 18 months old, pointing to pictures and communicating about the object instead of manually exploring the photos. Researchers believe a contributing factor to the decrease in manual exploration of pictures is the development of inhibitory control as the frontal cortex develops. It is also believed that experience with pictures contributes to the development as well.

Researchers have also noted that the observed behavior does not indicate a failure to discriminate between pictures and the real objects they depict. They have found that when given an object and a photograph of the object side-by-side, the child will almost always reach for the 3D object first, showing the ability to discriminate between 2D and 3D. However, researchers have also found that babies will display more manual interaction with increased pictorial realism; meaning the more a picture resembles an object, the more the child will try to interact with it. Children exhibit more manual exploration with photographs versus line drawings and with color pictures more than black and white.

Picture orientation was another subject of this research. Adults have a strong preference for viewing pictures oriented right side up. Children, however, were found to have a weak preference for viewing pictures right side up or no preference at all. DeLoache, Uttal, and Pierroutsakos found that when handed an upside-down book, 18-month-olds will usually study the book in the upside-down orientation. Though they were found to be indifferent to picture orientation, they were able to accurately identify pictures in either orientation. It is noted that the observed indifference to orientation is specific to pictures and was not seen in objects.

=== Young children with 3D models ===
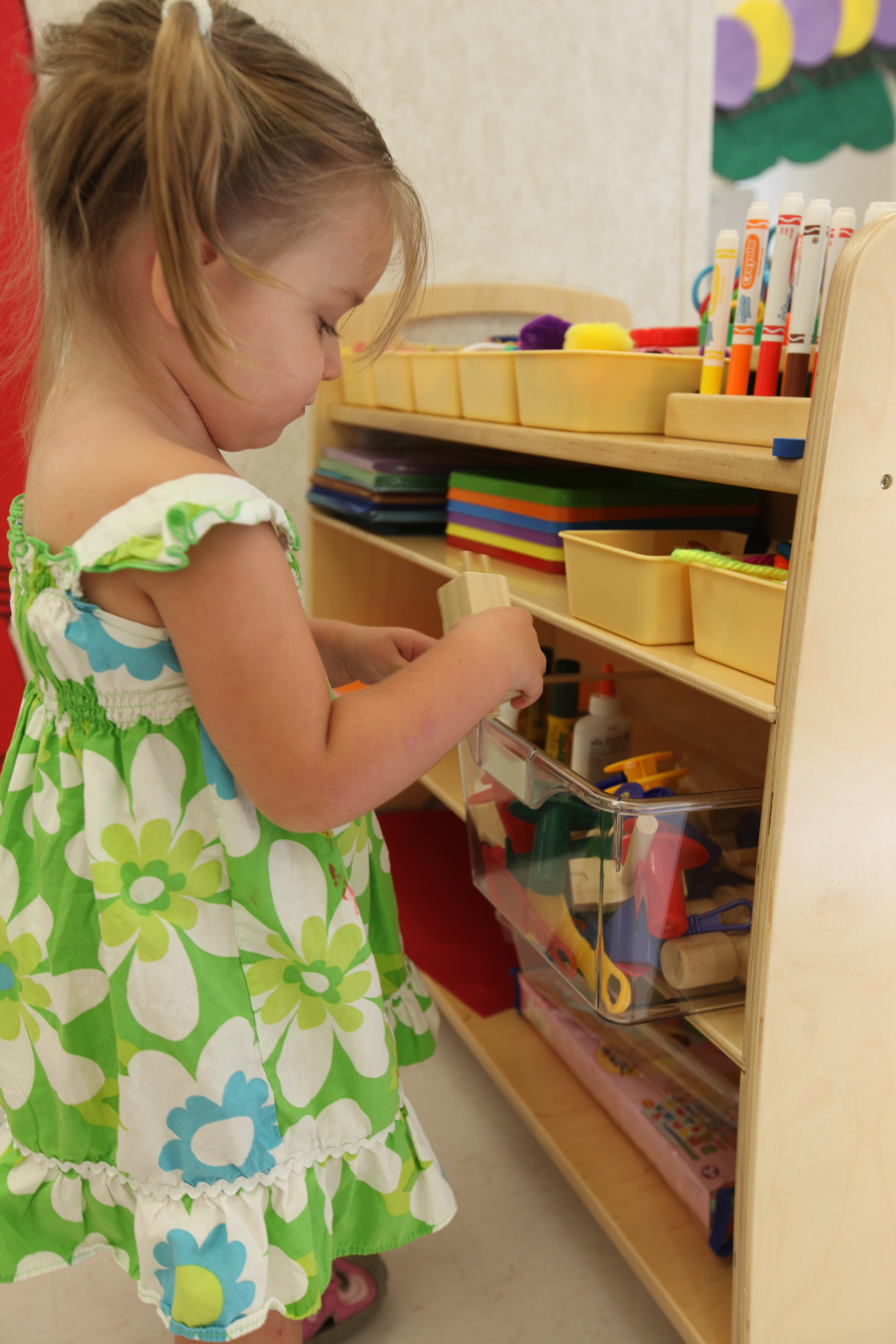
USMC-090810-M-3680M-003

Many variations on the original task retrieval experiment have been conducted using three-year-old and two-and-a-half-year-old children, yielding very different results between the two groups. Though only six months apart, three-year-olds consistently perform very well whereas two-and-a-half-year-olds perform very poorly, with a retrieval success rate of 75-90% and 15-20% respectively. Due to their limited experience with symbols and lack of maturity, younger children struggle to see an object as more than the object itself. They cannot achieve dual representation. The model becomes a very interesting object to the child, making it more difficult to see past its physicality. Some studies have found some symbolic objects allow dual representation to be achieved more easily. Pictures are found to be less interesting and, therefore, better allow for dual representation. It was found that, though babies struggle with pictures, two-and-a-half-year-old children were more successful at the retrieval task when shown the correct location in a picture of the room, finding the hidden toy in 80% of trials. This is very interesting as it contradicts current literature that shows pictures to be less effective than 3D models in cognitive activities such as learning and memory. These results show that, for young children, dual representation is more easily achieved using 2D pictures than 3D models. This observation led researchers to believe it was the simplicity of the pictures in relation to the model room that contributed to the success of children in completing the retrieval task. This hypothesis was tested using only a few pieces of furniture from the model room rather than the entire model to give the children fewer items to focus on. The furniture was arranged in a similar orientation to the corresponding furniture in the life-sized room. The two-and-a-half-year-old children then watched an experimenter hide a miniature toy under one of the model-sized pieces of furniture and were then asked to find the larger version in the life-sized room. The children were very unsuccessful in the retrieval task, demonstrating that the success found in the picture tasks was not a result of simpler models.

Other studies have found that distancing the symbolic object from the child also aids in dual representation. In one study, a model of the larger room was placed behind a window so that the child could see the model but not touch it. The child was shown where the toy was hidden in the model and then asked to find the toy in the larger room. The children were able to find the toy on their first try in 54% of the trials. In another study, the symbolic object was made more accessible to the children with the expectation that dual representation would be more difficult to achieve. Instead of placing the model behind a window, the children were allowed to play with the model before the retrieval task. The children were only able to find the hidden toy in 44% of trials, indicating that direct interaction with the model made it more difficult for the children to view the object symbolically. Additional studies found that models closer in size to the real room resulted in a greater success as did model furniture that more closely resembled the life-sized furniture.

As a child ages, dual representation becomes less challenging. This is likely assisted by other developmental accomplishments, including the ability to inhibit an initial response to a symbolic object, and increased experience with symbols.

=== The credible shrinking room ===
After conducting several experiments using the model room and the life-size room, DeLoache, in collaboration with Kevin Miller and Karl Rosengren, developed the credible shrinking room experiment. In this study, two-and-a-half-year-old children were placed in one of two study groups. The children in the first study group watched an experimenter hide a large doll in the life-sized room and then asked to find the miniature doll in the model room. The children in the second study group also watched an experimenter hide a large doll in the life-sized room; however, they were then convinced that a machine could shrink the life-size room into the model room. The first study group performed the symbolic task, which required dual representation. The second study group performed the nonsymbolic task, which was primarily a memory task that did not require dual representation. The rationale behind the shrinking room concept was that ″if a child believes that the model is the large room after having been shrunk, then there is no symbolic relation between the two spaces; to the credulous child, the model simply is the room." The researchers found that the two-and-a-half-year-olds performed poorly on the first task using the standard model, just as expected from previous experiments. However, the two-and-a-half-year-olds who completed the nonsymbolic task performed very well, significantly better than those who had completed the symbolic task. This study was repeated with different age groups and yielded similar results.

== In learning ==
Many math symbols and numbers

The acquisition of dual representation becomes more of a necessity as children begin school. Symbolic understanding is necessary for reading, writing, science, and mathematics. Though natural for adults, dual representation can be a developmental challenge for children in school. Mathematical symbols have been a challenge for young children to learn as they are abstract representations as opposed to the concrete representations used in experiments. Many researchers suggest the use of more concrete objects or "hands-on" activities in teaching. However, other researchers suggest using concrete objects as a teaching aid may not help children learn symbolic representations and may even distract them from the subject matter. Studies have shown that while realistic images can support learning, the addition of manipulative features in pictures books distracts children from the subject matter and hinders learning.

== Brain development ==
In the six months between two-and-a-half and three-years, several developmental changes occur in the child. A study was conducted in which young children were presented with large toys, such as a car or a chair, followed by miniature versions of those same toys. Behaviors known as scale errors were observed in which the children attempted to interact with the miniature objects in the same way they had with the larger versions. Researchers attribute these scale errors to "immature cortical functioning in normally developing young children." Young children struggle with inhibitory control due to an immature prefrontal cortex. The two-streams hypothesis has been cited as a potential explanation. The ventral stream is associated with object identity while the dorsal stream is associated with determining object size. It is believed that in young children, these two streams are not communicating properly, resulting in scale errors.

== In other species ==
Dual representation has been exhibited in certain animal species such as rats, dolphins, parrots, monkeys and chimpanzees. Experiments have shown that, with training, animals are capable of completing symbolic tasks such as simple arithmetic. Researchers believe a major player in these capabilities is the occipito-parietal pathways for spatial visual processing. Other studies have shown that both humans and animals use symbolic cognition to map spaces around them and locate certain objects, an ability necessary for survival. Humans, however, have the additional ability of communicating and sharing their representations of spaces through language and maps.

== See also ==
- Neural development
- Child development
- Piaget's theory of cognitive development
