= Barry E. Stein =

Barry E. Stein the Chairman of the Department of Neurobiology & Anatomy at the Wake Forest University School of Medicine, where he is also Professor of Neurology. He is also director of the joint Cognitive Neuroscience PhD Program between Wake Forest University and the University of Bologna in Italy.

His research objectives are to understand the neural basis by which the brain is able to integrate information from multiple senses and how the process develops during early life. This process of multisensory integration is highly adaptive. It knits together information from different sensory modalities (e.g., visual, auditory, somatosensory) to allow the brain to associate related environmental cues. It also enhances minimal signals and reduces environmental ambiguity so that events are better detected, localized, and identified. These are essential functions for humans' and animals' normal interaction with the environment.

One practical research objective has been to understand how the physiological properties of individual multisensory neurons and the networks in which they are embedded develop these capabilities as a result of early experience. To this end multidisciplinary anatomical, physiological, behavioral and perceptual approaches are utilized to explore how early experience crafts the underlying neural circuits.

One of the long-term objectives of Dr. Stein's research is to develop rehabilitative strategies to treat disorders of sensory processing. These include not only Sensory processing disorder; Autism; Attention Deficit Disorders; and Dyslexia, which are diagnosed in thousands of children every year, but also disorders induced by trauma and disease that can occur at any age. Many of these disorders share common problems in the ability to use the senses cooperatively and in segregating and aggregating environmental cues in meaningful ways.

Dr. Stein is a Fellow of the AAAS and has been a visiting scholar at the Rockefeller University. He has long been considered by researchers as one of the "founders" of the field of multisensory integration, and a number of his publications are seminal works in that area. In addition to early papers in Science and other highly regarded journals, his publications include three widely read books on multisensory processes: "The Merging of the Senses," with M. Alex Meredith, "The Handbook of Multisensory Processes," co-edited with Gemma Calvert and Charles Spence, and "The New Handbook of Multisensory Processes."

He attended Forest Hills High School in New York City, earned his bachelor's degree in 1966, master's degree in 1969 in psychology at Queens College of the City University of New York, and earned his PhD in 1971 in neuropsychology at Queens College. He was a post-doctoral research fellow at the Department of Anatomy and the Brain Research Institute at the University of California, Los Angeles School of Medicine. He then joined the faculty of the Department of Physiology and Biophysics at the Medical College of Virginia, where he achieved the rank of full professor and also served as interim chairman.

== Publications ==
Stein BE, Magalhaes-Castro B, and Kruger L Superior colliculus: visuotopic-somatotopic overlap. Science 189: pages 224-226, 1975.

Gaither NS and Stein BE Reptiles and mammals use similar sensory organizations in the midbrain. Science 205: pages 595-598, 1979

Stein BE, Clamann HP, and Goldberg SJ Superior colliculus: control of eye movements in neonatal kittens. Science 210: pages 78-80, 1980.

Meredith MA and Stein BE Interactions among converging sensory inputs in the superior colliculus. Science 221: pages 389-391, 1983.

Meredith MA and Stein BE Descending efferents from the superior colliculus relay integrated multisensory information. Science 227: pages 657-659, 1985.

Jiang H, Stein BE, and McHaffie JG Opposing basal ganglia processes shape midbrain visuomotor activity bilaterally. Nature 423: pages 982-986, 2003.

Wallace MT, Ramachandran R, and Stein BE A new view of sensory cortical parcellation. Proceedings of the National Academy of Sciences 101: pages 2167-2172, 2004.

Alvarado JC, Stanford TR, Vaughan JW, and Stein BE Cortex mediates multisensory but not unisensory integration in superior colliculus. Journal of Neuroscience 27: pages 12775-12786, 2007.

Stein BE and Stanford TR Multisensory integration: current issues from the perspective of the single neuron. Nature Reviews Neuroscience 9: pages 255-266, 2008.

Alvarado JC, Stanford TR, Rowland BA, Vaughan JW, and Stein BE Multisensory integration in the superior colliculus requires synergy among corticocollicular inputs. Journal of Neuroscience 29: pages 6580-6592, 2009.

Yu L, Stein BE, and Rowland BA Adult plasticity in multisensory neurons: Short-term experience-dependent changes in the superior colliculus. Journal of Neuroscience 29: pages 15910-15922, 2009.

Yu L, Rowland BA, and Stein BE Initiating the development of multisensory integration by manipulating sensory experience. Journal of Neuroscience 30: pages 4904-4913, 2010.

Cuppini C, Stein BE, Rowland BA, Magosso E, and Ursino M A computational study of multisensory maturation in the superior colliculus. Experimental Brain Research 213: pages 341-349, 2011.

Stein BE and Rowland BA Organization and plasticity in multisensory integration: early and late experience affects its governing principles. Progress in Brain Research 191: pages 145-163, 2011.
