= James Maclaurin =

James Scott Maclaurin (8 November 1864 – 19 January 1939) was a New Zealand analytical chemist. He was born in Unst, Shetland, Scotland on 8 November 1864.
