= Thomas Reydon =

Dutch philosopher

- Born: 1969 (age 56–57); The Hague
- Awards: Fellow of the Linnean Society of London

Education
- Education: Aloysius College, Leiden University

Philosophical work
- Era: 21st-century philosophy
- Region: Western philosophy
- School: Analytic philosophy
- Institutions: Leibniz University of Hannover
- Main interests: philosophy of science, philosophy of technology
- Website: www.reydon.info

Thomas A.C. Reydon (born 1969) is a Dutch philosopher and professor of philosophy of science and technology at Leibniz University of Hannover. He is known for his works on philosophy of science. He is an editor-in-chief of the Journal for General Philosophy of Science and an elected Fellow of the Linnean Society of London.

== Books ==
- The Scope of Evolutionary Thinking, Cambridge University Press, 2025 (Cambridge Elements in the Philosophy of Biology)
- Wissenschaftsethik: Eine Einführung, Ulmer/UTB, 2013
- Cultural Evolution and Social Ontology: Interdisciplinary Perspectives, Edited with Martina Valković, Routledge, 2026 (Routledge Studies in Contemporary Philosophy)
- Evolutionary Thinking Across Disciplines: Problems and Perspectives in Generalized Darwinism, Edited with Agathe Du Crest, Martina Valković, André Ariew, Hugh Desmond and Philippe Huneman Springer, 2023 (Synthese Library Vol. 478)
- Grundriss Wissenschaftsphilosophie:Die Philosophien der Einzelwissenschaften, Edited with Simon Lohse, Felix Meiner Verlag, 2017; licensed edition: Wissenschaftliche Buchgesellschaft, 2017
- Artefact Kinds: Ontology and the Human-Made World, Edited with Maarten Franssen, Peter Kroes and Pieter Vermaas, Springer, 2014 (Synthese Library Vol. 365)
- Philosophy of Behavioral Biology, Edited with Kathryn Plaisance, Springer, 2012 (Boston Studies in the Philosophy of Science Vol. 282)
- Der universale Leibniz: Denker, Forscher, Erfinder, Edited with Helmut Heit and Paul Hoyningen-Huene, Franz Steiner Verlag, 2009
- Current Themes in Theoretical Biology: A Dutch Perspective, Edited with Lia Hemerik, Springer, 2005
