= Developmental systems theory =

Evolutionary and developmental biology theory

Developmental systems theory (DST) is an overarching theoretical perspective on biological development, heredity, and evolution. It emphasizes the shared contributions of genes, environment, and epigenetic factors on developmental processes. DST, unlike conventional scientific theories, is not directly used to help make predictions for testing experimental results; instead, it is seen as a collection of philosophical, psychological, and scientific models of development and evolution. As a whole, these models argue the inadequacy of the modern evolutionary synthesis on the roles of genes and natural selection as the principal explanation of living structures. Developmental systems theory embraces a large range of positions that expand biological explanations of organismal development and hold modern evolutionary theory as a misconception of the nature of living processes.

== Overview ==
All versions of developmental systems theory espouse the view that:

- All biological processes (including both evolution and development) operate by continually assembling new structures.
- Each such structure transcends the structures from which it arose and has its own systematic characteristics, information, functions and laws.
- Conversely, each such structure is ultimately irreducible to any lower (or higher) level of structure, and can be described and explained only on its own terms.
- Furthermore, the major processes through which life as a whole operates, including evolution, heredity and the development of particular organisms, can only be accounted for by incorporating many more layers of structure and process than the conventional concepts of ‘gene’ and ‘environment’ normally allow for.

In other words, although it does not claim that all structures are equal, development systems theory is fundamentally opposed to reductionism of all kinds. In short, developmental systems theory intends to formulate a perspective which does not presume the causal (or ontological) priority of any particular entity and thereby maintains an explanatory openness on all empirical fronts. For example, there is vigorous resistance to the widespread assumptions that one can legitimately speak of genes ‘for’ specific phenotypic characters or that adaptation consists of evolution ‘shaping’ the more or less passive species, as opposed to adaptation consisting of organisms actively selecting, defining, shaping and often creating their niches.

== Developmental systems theory: Topics ==
=== Six Themes of DST ===
1. Joint Determination by Multiple Causes: Development is a product of multiple interacting sources.
2. Context Sensitivity and Contingency: Development depends on the current state of the organism.
3. Extended Inheritance: An organism inherits resources from the environment in addition to genes.
4. Development as a process of construction: The organism helps shape its own environment, such as the way a beaver builds a dam to raise the water level to build a lodge.
5. Distributed Control: Idea that no single source of influence has central control over an organism's development.
6. Evolution As Construction: The evolution of an entire developmental system, including whole ecosystems of which given organisms are parts, not just the changes of a particular being or population.

=== A computing metaphor ===
To adopt a computing metaphor, the reductionists (whom developmental systems theory opposes) assume that causal factors can be divided into ‘processes’ and ‘data’, as in the Harvard computer architecture. Data (inputs, resources, content, and so on) is required by all processes, and must often fall within certain limits if the process in question is to have its ‘normal’ outcome. However, the data alone is helpless to create this outcome, while the process may be ‘satisfied’ with a considerable range of alternative data.

Developmental systems theory, by contrast, assumes that the process/data distinction is at best misleading and at worst completely false, and that while it may be helpful for very specific pragmatic or theoretical reasons to treat a structure now as a process and now as a datum, there is always a risk (to which reductionists routinely succumb) that this methodological convenience will be promoted into an ontological conclusion. In fact, for the proponents of DST, either all structures are both process and data, depending on context, or even more radically, no structure is either.

=== Fundamental asymmetry ===
For reductionists there is a fundamental asymmetry between different causal factors, whereas for DST such asymmetries can only be justified by specific purposes, and argue that many of the (generally unspoken) purposes to which such (generally exaggerated) asymmetries have been put are scientifically illegitimate. Thus, for developmental systems theory, many of the most widely applied, asymmetric and entirely legitimate distinctions biologists draw (between, say, genetic factors that create potential and environmental factors that select outcomes or genetic factors of determination and environmental factors of realisation) obtain their legitimacy from the conceptual clarity and specificity with which they are applied, not from their having tapped a profound and irreducible ontological truth about biological causation. One problem might be solved by reversing the direction of causation correctly identified in another. This parity of treatment is especially important when comparing the evolutionary and developmental explanations for one and the same character of an organism.

=== DST approach ===
One upshot of this approach is that developmental systems theory also argues that what is inherited from generation to generation is a good deal more than simply genes (or even the other items, such as the fertilised zygote, that are also sometimes conceded). As a result, much of the conceptual framework that justifies ‘selfish gene’ models is regarded by developmental systems theory as not merely weak but actually false. Not only are major elements of the environment built and inherited as materially as any gene but active modifications to the environment by the organism (for example, a termite mound or a beaver’s dam) demonstrably become major environmental factors to which future adaptation is addressed. Thus, once termites have begun to build their monumental nests, it is the demands of living in those very nests to which future generations of termite must adapt.

This inheritance may take many forms and operate on many scales, with a multiplicity of systems of inheritance complementing the genes. From position and maternal effects on gene expression to epigenetic inheritance to the active construction and intergenerational transmission of enduring niches, development systems theory argues that not only inheritance but evolution as a whole can be understood only by taking into account a far wider range of ‘reproducers’ or ‘inheritance systems’ – genetic, epigenetic, behavioural and symbolic – than neo-Darwinism’s ‘atomic’ genes and gene-like ‘replicators’. DST regards every level of biological structure as susceptible to influence from all the structures by which they are surrounded, be it from above, below, or any other direction – a proposition that throws into question some of (popular and professional) biology’s most central and celebrated claims, not least the ‘central dogma’ of Mendelian genetics, any direct determination of phenotype by genotype, and the very notion that any aspect of biological (or psychological, or any other higher form) activity or experience is capable of direct or exhaustive genetic or evolutionary ‘explanation’.

Developmental systems theory is plainly radically incompatible with both neo-Darwinism and information processing theory. Whereas neo-Darwinism defines evolution in terms of changes in gene distribution, the possibility that an evolutionarily significant change may arise and be sustained without any directly corresponding change in gene frequencies is an elementary assumption of developmental systems theory, just as neo-Darwinism’s ‘explanation’ of phenomena in terms of reproductive fitness is regarded as fundamentally shallow. Even the widespread mechanistic equation of ‘gene’ with a specific DNA sequence has been thrown into question, as have the analogous interpretations of evolution and adaptation.

Likewise, the wholly generic, functional and anti-developmental models offered by information processing theory are comprehensively challenged by DST’s evidence that nothing is explained without an explicit structural and developmental analysis on the appropriate levels. As a result, what qualifies as ‘information’ depends wholly on the content and context out of which that information arises, within which it is translated and to which it is applied.

== Criticism ==
Philosopher Neven Sesardić, while not dismissive of developmental systems theory, argues that its proponents forget that the role between levels of interaction is ultimately an empirical issue, which cannot be settled by a priori speculation; Sesardić observes that while the emergence of lung cancer is a highly complicated process involving the combined action of many factors and interactions, it is not unreasonable to believe that smoking has an effect on developing lung cancer. Therefore, though developmental processes are highly interactive, context dependent, and extremely complex, it is incorrect to conclude main effects of heredity and environment are unlikely to be found in the "messiness". Sesardić argues that the idea that changing the effect of one factor always depends on what is happening in other factors is an empirical claim, as well as a false one; for example, the bacterium Bacillus thuringiensis produces a protein that is toxic to caterpillars. Genes from this bacterium have been placed into plants vulnerable to caterpillars and the insects proceed to die when they eat part of the plant, as they consume the toxic protein. Thus, developmental approaches must be assessed on a case by case basis and in Sesardić's view, DST does not offer much if only posed in general terms. Hereditarian Psychologist Linda Gottfredson differentiates the "fallacy of so–called 'interactionism'" from the technical use of gene-environment interaction to denote a non–additive environmental effect conditioned upon genotype. “Interactionism's” over–generalization cannot render attempts to identify genetic and environmental contributions meaningless. Where behavioural genetics attempts to determine portions of variation accounted for by genetics, environmental–developmentalistics like DST attempt to determine the typical course of human development and erroneously conclude the common theme is readily changed.

Another Sesardić argument counters another DST claim of impossibility of determining contribution of trait influence (genetic vs. environment). It necessarily follows a trait cannot be causally attributed to environment as genes and environment are inseparable in DST. Yet DST, critical of genetic heritability, advocates developmentalist research of environmental effects, a logical inconsistency. Barnes et al., made similar criticisms observing that the innate human capacity for language (deeply genetic) does not determine the specific language spoken (a contextually environmental effect). It is then, in principle, possible to separate the effects of genes and environment. Similarly, Steven Pinker argues if genes and environment couldn't actually be separated then speakers have a deterministic genetic disposition to learn a specific native language upon exposure. Though seemingly consistent with the idea of gene–environment interaction, Pinker argues it is nonetheless an absurd position since empirical evidence shows ancestry has no effect on language acquisition — environmental effects are often separable from genetic ones.

== Related theories ==
Developmental systems theory is not a narrowly defined collection of ideas, and the boundaries with neighbouring models are porous. Notable related ideas (with key texts) include:

- The Baldwin effect
- Evolutionary developmental biology
- Neural Darwinism
- Probabilistic epigenesis
- Relational developmental systems

== See also ==
- Systems theory
- Complex adaptive system
- Developmental psychobiology
- The Dialectical Biologist - a 1985 book by Richard Levins and Richard Lewontin which describe a related approach.
- Living systems
