= Development and Psychopathology =

- Discipline: Psychiatry
- Language: English
- Edited by: Dante Cicchetti

Publication details
- History: 1989-present
- Publisher: Cambridge University Press
- Frequency: Monthly
- Impact factor: 4.357 (2017)

Standard abbreviations
- ISO 4: Dev. Psychopathol.

Indexing
- ISSN: 0954-5794 (print); 1469-2198 (web)

Links
- Journal homepage; Online access; Online archive

Development and Psychopathology is a peer-reviewed medical journal that covers research which addresses the interrelationship of typical and atypical psychological development in children and adults. It was established in 1989 and is published by Cambridge University Press. According to the Journal Citation Reports, the journal has a 2017 impact factor of 4.357.
