= Developmental science =

Developmental science is an interdisciplinary scientific field that synthesizes perspectives from biology, psychology, and sociology in order to understand behavioral and psychological aspects of human development. The field of developmental science "...is not limited to simply describing deviant behavior at a specific age, but rather examines the dynamic interplay of biopsychosocial risk and protective conditions in the course of development over an individual’s lifespan." It is based on theories previously developed by such psychologists as Jean Piaget, Heinz Werner, and Lev Vygotsky, as well as on dynamic systems theory. In recent years, the field has undergone a paradigm shift away from reductionism to one based on complex, interacting systems, with an increasing emphasis on change over time.
