= Marc Lewis =

Canadian psychology professor and author

Marc David Lewis
- Born: 1951 (age 74–75)
- Spouse: Isabela Granic
- Children: 3
- Awards: PROSE award for Psychology, 2016

Academic background
- Education: University of California, Berkeley (BA, 1975)
- Alma mater: University of Toronto (MA, 1986; Ph.D., 1989)

Academic work
- Discipline: Developmental psychology
- Institutions: University of Toronto, 1989-2010; Radboud University Nijmegen, 2010-2016
- Notable works: The Biology of Desire; Memoirs of an Addicted Brain
- Website: memoirsofanaddictedbrain.com

Marc Lewis (born 1951) is a Canadian clinical psychologist, neuroscientist, academic, and author from Toronto, Ontario.

He was a professor at the University of Toronto from 1989 to 2010 and Radboud University Nijmegen in Nijmegen, the Netherlands from 2010 to 2016. He is particularly focused on the study of addiction. His work is informed by his own experience of drug addiction, and is notable for its focus on neuroscience and the changes addiction causes in the brain. His books include Memoirs of an Addicted Brain and The Biology of Desire, which Damian Thompson of The Spectator called "the most important study of addiction to be published for many years." He has argued that the standard view of addiction as a disease is misleading and even potentially harmful, suggesting instead that it is best viewed as a process of "deep learning." This has been controversial.

He has also written or co-written more than 75 journal articles and chapters on developmental psychology, neuroscience, addiction and related topics.

== Early life ==
Lewis was born in 1951 and grew up in the York Mills neighborhood of Toronto in a middle-class Jewish family; his father was a doctor. He has a brother, Michael. His parents divorced in 1970. As a teenager, he attended Tabor Academy, a preparatory school in Massachusetts, but did not have a good experience there, becoming depressed and beginning his experimentation with drugs. By age 17, as a university student, he had begun using heroin.

After earning a bachelor's degree in music from University of California—Berkeley in 1975, Lewis traveled for two years in Asia, including Malaysia, Thailand, Laos, Burma, and a nine-month stint studying the sitar in India. There, his addiction came to include opium. Through his 20s, Lewis used a variety of substances including marijuana, cocaine, LSD, heroin, PCP, and methamphetamine. Spiraling out of control, he lost his job and first marriage, and was expelled from graduate school. He began stealing drugs from labs and medical centers in Ontario, for which he was convicted and sentenced to probation. This experience led him to fight and eventually overcome his addiction.

== Career ==
=== Teaching and research ===
Lewis returned to graduate school at the University of Toronto, where he studied cognitive and emotional development, developmental (cognitive) neuroscience, as well as child-clinical psychology, as well as the neuroscience of addiction. He earned a master's degree in applied psychology in 1986, and a Ph.D. in 1989. His thesis supervisor was Robbie Case, a professor of developmental psychology. He has called himself a "direct descendant" intellectually from Swiss psychologist Jean Piaget, whose work was a strong influence on both Case and Lewis.

Lewis became an associate professor at the University of Toronto shortly after completing his Ph.D. in 1989, and became a full professor in 2000. In 2010, he and his wife Isabela Granic, who is also a research scientist in developmental psychopathology, moved to the Netherlands to teach at Radboud University Nijmegen. He retired from academia in 2016.

As a scientist, Lewis has specialized in researching the emotional development of children and adolescents and the questions of how and why the brain changes during addiction. His academic research, as well as The Biology of Desire and other writing for the non-academic press, has also challenged the "disease model" of addiction, which Lewis says can be counterproductive toward recovery, though he acknowledges it has been helpful for many people. Instead, Lewis suggests that it is better described as a process of deep learning and habit formation that is destructive and difficult to break, but can be overcome through insight and self-empowerment. His views have sometimes been controversial. He has been critical of 12-step programs, saying that although the programs are effective for some people, they tend not to teach the psychological skills, including emotion regulation, needed to reduce or eliminate addictive substance use after leaving. He argues that the disease model is often used to justify expensive but ineffective treatment by rehabilitation clinics, and encourages passivity, fatalism, and pessimism in those seeking treatment. Nevertheless, he has said that he thinks the causes of addiction are best seen as somewhere between a compulsion and a choice, calling the two views a "false dichotomy".

Lewis has been a frequent speaker on topics of addiction and neuroscience, including Gustavus Adolphus College's 2015 Nobel Conference, "Addiction: Exploring the Science and Experience of an Equal Opportunity Condition", the TEDxRadboudU 2013 conference. and a conversation with the Dalai Lama at the Mind & Life Institute's 2013 conference on addiction in Dharamshala, India.

=== Books ===
==== The Biology of Desire ====
Lewis' 2015 book The Biology of Desire: Why Addiction is Not a Disease examines the neuroscience of addiction through in-depth case studies of five people living through addiction and recovery. The book is critical of the standard model of treating addiction as a disease. Instead, Lewis encourages the control or elimination of substance use and binge-eating disorders through self-sustaining personal empowerment and an understanding of the psychology and neurobiology of addiction.

The Biology of Desire received the PROSE award for Psychology from the Association of American Publishers in 2016.

Reviews of The Biology of Desire were largely positive. Kirkus Reviews called it a "intellectually authoritative yet controversial declaration that substance and behavioral dependencies are swiftly and deeply learned via the 'neural circuitry of desire.'" Richard Ferguson of The Sydney Morning Herald praised the book's "very readable" writing style, saying that its "success lies in its ability to communicate complex ideas in a way that will engage you and move you and sometimes make you laugh." Publishers Weekly agreed, saying "Even when presenting more technical information, Lewis shows a keen ability to put a human face on the most groundbreaking research into addiction."

==== Memoirs of an Addicted Brain ====
Lewis' 2011 book Memoirs of an Addicted Brain: A Neuroscientist Examines his Former Life on Drugs is a combination of traditional memoir and treatise on the neuroscience of drug addiction. Lewis alternates between stories from his own life and explanations of how drugs affect the neurochemistry of the brain, using his own experience with addiction to illuminate and humanize the science. The book was based on journals Lewis kept from age 17.

Kirkus Reviews called it "a smoothly entertaining interplay between lived experience and the particulars of brain activity." Writing for recovery-focused website The Fix, reviewer Walter Armstrong said that the book "may be the most original and illuminating addiction memoir since Thomas De Quincey's seminal Confessions of an English Opium-Eater," saying that Lewis approached the topic of addiction with "supple intelligence and subtle style" and that Lewis' "unique perspective" as both an addict and a scientist made the book a standout in its genre "as over-the-top suspenseful as David Carr’s classic The Night of the Gun."

==== Other books ====
With his wife Isabela Granic, he co-wrote the 2010 book Bedtiming: The Parent's Guide to Getting Your Child to Sleep at Just the Right Age, a guide for parents in training their young children in going to sleep at ages that work well, or not well, according to developmental stage theory. The book draws on both the couple's academic research and their experience as parents of twin boys. Kingston Whig-Standard reviewer Marilyn Linton noted that it is one of the few books on the topic to consider the importance of cognitive brain development.

He and Granic also co-edited the 2002 book Emotion, Development, and Self-Organization: Dynamic Systems Approaches to Emotional Development, part of the series Cambridge Studies in Social and Emotional Development.

=== Other writing ===
Lewis is author or co-author of more than 75 journal articles on developmental psychology, neuroscience, addiction and related topics. Beyond his academic writing, Lewis has written frequently for the mainstream news media on the topic of addiction. He wrote the column "Addicted Brains" for the magazine Psychology Today from 2012 to 2018. He has also written for The New England Journal of Medicine, The New York Times, Newsweek, Literary Review of Canada, Aeon, Scientific American, University of Toronto Magazine, The Scientist, The Guardian, Huffington Post, and Salon.

== Personal life ==
Lewis has been married three times. He and his current wife, Isabela Granic, have twin sons. He also has a daughter from his second marriage.

== Selected work and publications ==
External videos
- "The Role of Craving in the Cycle of Addictive Behavior: Conversation with the Dalai Lama": October 28, 2013, Mind & Life XXVII, Mind & Life Institute
- "Reflections on the Science and Experience of Addiction": Oct. 8, 2015, Nobel Conference 51 at Gustavus Adolphus College
- "Addiction and Trust: Marc Lewis at TEDxRadboudU 2013": May 29, 2013, TEDx Talks
- "Overcoming Addiction with Neuroscience & IFS: Dr. Marc Lewis": May 9, 2021, The Weekend University
- "The Neuroscience of Addiction": Dec. 10, 2016, The Royal Institution of Great Britain
- "Q&A with Marc Lewis": Dec. 10, 2016, The Royal Institution of Great Britain
- "Is Addiction a Brain Disease?": March 13, 2018, University of Virginia School of Law
- "Marc Lewis: Learning Addiction": September 6, 2015, Festival of Dangerous Ideas 2015
- "Technophilia Panel": September 6, 2015, Festival of Dangerous Ideas 2015

=== Books ===
- Marc Lewis, The Biology of Desire: Why Addiction Is Not a Disease (PublicAffairs, 2015)
- Marc Lewis, Memoirs of an Addicted Brain: A Neuroscientist Examines his Former Life on Drugs (Doubleday Canada, 2011)
- Marc Lewis and Isabela Granic, Bedtiming: The Parent's Guide to Getting Your Child to Sleep at Just the Right Age (The Experiment, 2010)
- Marc Lewis and Isabela Granic (editors), Emotion, Development, and Self-Organization: Dynamic Systems Approaches to Emotional Development (Cambridge University Press, 2002)

=== Talks and lectures ===
- "Addiction and Trust", TEDx–Radboud University, 29 May 2013
- "The Role of Craving in the Cycle of Addictive Behavior", conversation with the Dalai Lama, Mind & Life XXVII, Mind & Life Institute, Dharamshala, India, 28 October 2013
- "Learning Addiction", Festival of Dangerous Ideas 2015, Sydney, Australia, 6 September 2015
- "Technophilia", discussion with Martin Ford, Festival of Dangerous Ideas 2015, Sydney, Australia, 6 September 2015
- "Why Addiction Is Not a Disease", The Middle Way podcast with Barry Daniel, 4 October 2015
- "Reflections on the Science and Experience Addiction", Nobel Conference on Addiction, Gustavus Adolphus College, 7 October 2015
- "Is Addiction a Disease?", debate with George Koob, CBC Radio's Out In the Open, 9 July 2016
- "London Thinks: Is Addiction a Disease?", interview/presentation at Conway Hall, London, 13 July 2016
- "The Neuroscience of Addiction: Development, Not Disease", presentation at The Royal Institution of Great Britain, 14 July 2016
- "Tricks of the Mind", Guardian Books podcast, 12 September 2016
- "Drugs, Desire, and Disease: Neuroscience and Addiction", public debate, David Winston Turner Endowment Fund, Melbourne, Australia, 21 October 2016
- "A Brain Disease…or What?", debate with Nora Volkow, Amsterdam Brain and Cognition, Amsterdam, 9 January 2018
- "Is Addiction a Brain Disease? And Does It Matter?", P. Browning Hoffman Memorial Lecture in Law and Psychiatry, University of Virginia, Charlottesville, USA, 15 March 2018
- "Addiction as Learning: Narrowing Brains in Narrowing Environments", University of Bergen, Sogndal, Norway, 4 September 2019

=== Articles for mainstream news and science press ===
- "Dopamine: Duality of Desire", The Scientist, 1 May 2012
- "Addiction Is a Bad Habit That Can Be Learned and Unlearned", New York Times, 10 February 2014
- "Why we’re hardwired to hate uncertainty", The Guardian, 4 April 2016
- "What LSD tells us about human nature", The Guardian, 15 April 2016
- "Why it’s wrong to call addiction a disease", The Guardian, 7 June 2016
- "Here’s why there are no good or bad drugs–not even heroin", The Guardian, 14 July 2016
- "Is addiction really a disease?", The Observer/The Guardian, 24 July 2016
- "Why is the US banning kratom, the virtually harmless herb?", The Guardian, 9 September 2016
- "The addiction habit", Aeon, 14 December 2016
- "We need ecstasy and opioids in place of Prozac and Xanax", Aeon, 15 May 2017
- "Why are so many people dying from opiate overdoses? It’s our broken society", The Guardian, 10 July 2017
- "The truth about the US ‘opioid crisis’ — prescriptions aren’t the problem", The Guardian, 7 November 2017
- "Why the disease model of addiction does far more harm than good", Scientific American, 9 February 2018

== Selected academic publications ==
=== Journal articles ===
- Lewis, M., "Brain change in addiction as learning, not disease", New England Journal of Medicine, 2018
- Lewis, M., "Addiction and the brain: Development, not disease", Neuroethics, 2017
- Liu, X., Woltering, S., & Lewis, M.D., "Developmental change in EEG theta activity in the medial prefrontal cortex during response control", NeuroImage, 2014
- Woltering, S., Granic, I., Lamm, C., & Lewis, M.D., "Neural changes associated with treatment outcome in children with externalizing problems", Biological Psychiatry, 2011
- Lamm, C., Granic, I., Zelazo, P.D., & Lewis, M.D., "Magnitude and chronometry of neural mechanisms of emotion regulation in subtypes of aggressive children", Brain & Cognition, 2011
- Prencipe, A., Kesek, A., Cohen, J., Lamm, C., Lewis, M.D., & Zelazo, P.D., "Development of hot and cool executive function during the transition to adolescence", Journal of Experimental Child Psychology, 2011
- Nenadovic, V., Garcia Dominguez, L., Lewis, M.D., Snead, O.C, Gorin, A., Perez Velazquez, J.L.,, "Transient coordinated activity within the developing brain's default network", Cognitive Neurodynamics, 2011
- Lewis, M.D., "Dynamic systems approaches: Cool enough? Hot enough?", Child Development Perspectives, 2011
- Lewis, M.D., & Liu, Z., "Three time scales of neural self-organization underlying basic and nonbasic emotions", Emotion Review, 2011
- Lewis, M.D., "Dopamine and the neural now: Essay and review of Addiction, a disorder of choice", Perspectives on Psychological Science, 2011
- Todd, R.M., Evans, J.W., Morris, D., Lewis, M.D., & Taylor, M.J., "The changing face of emotion: Age related patterns of amygdala activation to salient faces", Social Cognitive and Affective Neuroscience, 2011
- Chapman, H., Woltering, S., Lamm, C.& Lewis, M.D., "Hearts and minds: Coordination of neurocognitive and cardiovascular regulation in children and adolescents", Biological Psychology, 2010
- Lamm, C., & Lewis, M.D., "Developmental change in the neurophysiological correlates of self-regulation in high- and low-emotion conditions", Developmental Neuropsychology, 2010
- Woltering, S., & Lewis, M.D., "Developmental pathways of emotion regulation in childhood: A neuropsychological perspective", Mind, Brain, and Education, 2009
- Thompson, R.A., Lewis, M.D., & Calkins, S.D., "Reassessing emotion regulation", Child Development Perspectives, 2008
- Lewis, M.D., Granic, I., Lamm, C., Zelazo, P.D., Stieben, J., Todd, R.M., Moadab, I., & Pepler, D., "Changes in the neural bases of emotion regulation associated with clinical improvement in children with behavior problems", Development and Psychopathology, 2008
- Todd, R.M., Lewis, M.D., Meusel, L.A., & Zelazo, P.D., "The time course of social-emotional processing in early childhood: ERP responses to facial affect and personal familiarity in a Go-Nogo task", Neuropsychologia, 2008
- Granic, I., O’Hara, A., Pepler, D., & Lewis, M.D., "A dynamic systems analysis of parent-child changes associated with successful “real-world” interventions for aggressive children", Journal of Abnormal Child Psychology, 2007
- Lewis, M.D., & Todd, R.M., "The self-regulating brain: Cortical-subcortical feedback and the development of intelligent action", Cognitive Development, 2007
- Lewis, M.D., & Cook, M.L., "Changing habits of emotion regulation at transition points in infancy: A dynamic systems analysis", Journal of Developmental Processes, 2007
- Stieben, J., Lewis, M.D., Granic, I., Zelazo, P.D., & Pepler, D., "Neurophysiological correlates of emotion regulation for subtypes of antisocial children", Development and Psychopathology, 2007
- Lewis, M.D., Todd, R.M., & Honsberger, M., "Event-related potential measures of emotion regulation in early childhood", NeuroReport, 2007
- Lewis, M.D., Granic, I., & Lamm, C., "Behavioral differences in aggressive children linked with neural mechanisms of emotion regulation", Annals of the New York Academy of Sciences, 2006
- Hollenstein, T., & Lewis, M.D., "A state space analysis of emotion and flexibility in parent-child interactions", Emotion, 2006
- Lamm, C., Zelazo, P.D., & Lewis, M.D., "Neural correlates of cognitive control in childhood and adolescence: Disentangling the contributions of age and executive function", Neuropsychologia, 2006
- Lewis, M.D., Lamm, C., Segalowitz, S.J., Stieben, S., & Zelazo, P.D., "Neurophysiological correlates of emotion regulation in children and adolescents", Journal of Cognitive Neuroscience, 2006
- Howe, M.L., & Lewis, M.D., "The importance of dynamic systems approaches for understanding development", Developmental Review, 2005
- Lewis, M.D., "Self-organizing individual differences in brain development", Developmental Review, 2005
- Lewis, M.D.& Todd, R.M., "Getting emotional: A neural perspective on emotion, intention, and consciousness", Journal of Consciousness Studies, 2005
- Lewis, M.D., "An emerging dialogue among social scientists and neuroscientists on the causal bases of emotion", Behavioral and Brain Sciences, 2005
- Lewis, M.D., "Bridging emotion theory and neurobiology through dynamic systems modeling", Behavioral and Brain Sciences, 2005
- Lewis, M.D., "Trouble ahead: Predicting antisocial trajectories with dynamic systems concepts and methods", Journal of Abnormal Child Psychology, 2004
- Lewis, M.D., & Stieben, J., "Emotion regulation in the brain: Conceptual issues and directions for developmental research", Child Development, 2004
- Evans, D.W., Lewis, M.D., & Iobst, E., "The role of the orbitofrontal cortex in normally developing compulsive behaviors and obsessive-compulsive disorder", Brain and Cognition, 2004
- Lewis, M.D., Zimmerman, S., Hollenstein, T., & Lamey, A.V., "Reorganization of coping behavior at 1 1/2 years: Dynamic systems and normative change", Developmental Science, 2004
- Lewis, M.D., "The dialogical brain: Contributions of emotional neurobiology to understanding the dialogical self", Theory and Psychology, 2002
- Lewis, M.D., "The promise of dynamic systems approaches for an integrated account of human development", Child Development, 2000
- Lewis, M.D., Lamey, A.V., & Douglas, L., "A new dynamic systems method for the analysis of early socioemotional development", Developmental Science, 1999
- Lewis, M.D., & Granic, I., "Who put the self in self-organization? A clarification of terms and concepts for developmental psychopathology", Development and Psychopathology, 1999
- Lewis, M.D., Koroshegyi, C., Douglas, L., & Kampe, K., "Age-specific associations between emotional responses to separation and cognitive performance in infancy", Developmental Psychology, 1997
- Lewis, M.D., "Self-organising cognitive appraisals", Cognition and Emotion, 1996
- Lewis, M.D., "Cognition-emotion feedback and the self-organization of developmental paths", Human Development, 1995
- Lewis, M.D., "Reconciling stage and specificity in neo-Piagetian theory: Self-organizing conceptual structures", Human Development, 1994
- Lewis, M.D., "Early socioemotional predictors of cognitive competency at four years", Developmental Psychology, 1993
- Lewis, M.D., "A neo-Piagetian interpretation of Melanie Klein's theory of infancy", Psychoanalysis and Contemporary Thought, 1993
- Lewis, M.D., "Emotion-cognition interactions in early infant development", Cognition and Emotion, 1993
- Lewis, M.D., & Ash, A.J., "Evidence for a neo-Piagetian stage transition in early cognitive development", International Journal of Behavioral Development, 1992
- Lewis, M.D., "Early infant-mother interaction as a predictor of problem solving in toddlers", International Journal of Early Childhood, 1989
- Case, R., Hayward, S., Lewis, M.D., & Hurst, P., "Toward a neo-Piagetian theory of cognitive and emotional development", Developmental Review, 1988
- Lewis, M.D., "Biography of the first year: A case study integrating psychoanalytic, cognitive-developmental and mother-infant systems perspectives", Early Child Development and Care, 1988

=== Commentaries ===
- Lewis, M.D. "The slippery slope of downward causation", Human Development, 2011
- Lewis, M.D. "Self-organizing brains don't develop gradually", Behavioral and Brain Sciences, 2000
- Ramsay, J.T., & Lewis, M.D. "Causal status of emotions in consciousness", Behavioral and Brain Sciences, 2000

=== Chapters in books ===
- Lewis, M., "Brain Change in Addiction: Disease or Learning? Implications for Science, Policy, and Care", in Evaluating the Brain Disease Model of Addiction (Routledge, 202)
- Lewis, M., "Choice in Addiction: A Neural Tug of War Between Impulse and Insight", in Addiction and Choice: Rethinking the Relationship (Oxford University Press, 2013)
- Woltering, S., & Lewis, M.D., "Changing the Neural Mechanism of Emotion Regulation in Children With Behavior Problems", in Changing Emotions (Psychology Press, 2013)
- Woltering, S., & Lewis, M.D., "Conceptual Development and Emotion: A Neuropsychological Perspective", in The Wiley-Blackwell Handbook of Childhood Social Development (Wiley-Blackwell, 2011)
- Lewis, M.D., Todd, R.M., & Xu, X., "The Development of Emotion Regulation: A Neuropsychological Perspective", in Handbook of Life-Span Development (Wiley, 2010)
- Lewis, M.D., & Granic, I., "Phases of Social-emotional Development From Birth to School Age", in The Developmental Relations Between Mind, Brain, and Education (Springer, 2010)
- Lewis, M.D., "Desire, Dopamine, and Conceptual Development", in Child Development at the Intersection of Emotion and Cognition (American Psychological Association, 2010)
- Kesek, A., Zelazo, P.D., & Lewis M.D., "The Development of Executive Cognitive Function and Emotion Regulation in Adolescence", in Adolescent Emotional Development and the Emergence of Depressive Disorders (Cambridge University Press, 2009)
- Todd, R.M., & Lewis, M.D., "Self-regulation in the Developing Brain", in Child Neuropsychology: Concepts, Theory and Practice (Wiley-Blackwell, 2008)
- Lewis, M.D., "Emotional Habits in Brain and Behavior: A Window on Personality Development", in Human Development in the Twenty-first Century: Visionary Policy Ideas From Systems Scientists (Cambridge University Press, 2007)
- Lewis, M.D. "The Emergence of Mind in the Emotional Brain", in Cognitive Developmental Change: Theories, Models and Measurement (Cambridge University Press, 2005)
- Lewis, M.D., & Todd, R., "Toward a Neuropsychological Model of Internal Dialogue: Implications for Theory and Clinical Practice", in The Dialogical Self in Psychotherapy (Brunner-Routledge, 2004)
- Lewis, M.D., "Interacting Time Scales in Personality (and Cognitive) Development: Intentions, Emotions, and Emergent Forms", in Microdevelopment: Transition Processes in Development and Learning (Cambridge University Press, 2002)
- Lewis, M.D., & Ferrari, M. "Cognitive-emotional Self-organization in Personality Development and Personal Identity", in Identity and Emotions: A Self-organizational Perspective (Cambridge University Press, 2001)
- Lewis, M.D., "Personal Pathways in the Development of Appraisal: A Complex Systems/stage Theory Perspective", in Appraisal Processes in Emotion (Oxford University Press, 2001)
- Lewis, M.D., "Emotional Self-organization at Three Time Scales"and "A New Approach to the Study of Emotional Development", in Emotion, Development, and Self-organization: Dynamic Systems Approaches to Emotional Development (Cambridge University Press, 2000)
- Lewis, M.D. "A Dynamic Systems Approach to Measuring Behavioural Flexibility in Early Personality Development", in The Strengths of Children: Education Between Risk and Resilience (Ernst-Reinhardt-Verlag, 1999)
- Lewis, M.D., & Granic, I., "Self-organization of Cognition-emotion Interactions", in Handbook of Cognition and Emotion (Wiley, 1999)
- Lewis, M.D., & Douglas, L., "A Dynamic Systems Approach to Cognition-emotion Interactions in Development", in What Develops in Emotional Development? (Plenum, 1998)
- Lewis, M.D., & Junyk, N., "The Self-organization of Psychological Defenses", in The Psychological Meaning of Chaos: Translating Theory Into Practice (American Psychological Association, 1997)
- Lewis, M.D., "Personality Self-organization: Cascading Constraints on Cognition-emotion Interaction", in Dynamics and Indeterminism in Developmental and Social Processes (Erlbaum, 1997)
