= Cornell Department of Human Development =

Cornell University department

The Department of Human Development was a multidisciplinary department at Cornell University from 1925 to 2021. During its lifetime, the Department led research on developmental science to simultaneously advance theory and improve life. The department emphasized an ecological perspective of human development that examined social, cultural, biological, and psychological processes and mechanisms of growth and change throughout the life cycle and across diverse contexts. Many significant social science scholars of the 20th and 21st century, including Urie Bronfenbrenner (ecological systems theory, co-founder of Head Start) and Kurt Lewin (group dynamics, organizational development), were among the department's faculty. A number of the department's graduate students became significant figures in the social sciences with their work tending toward interdisciplinary and cross-disciplinary approaches.

== History of the department ==
The department was originally founded in 1925 as the Department of Family Life at Cornell. Its founding occurred during a broader historical context in the United States during the 1920s that saw improving and expanding the science of child psychology and child rearing as a national imperative. It was one of the first university departments established in the United States that focused on child development specifically within the context of the family. Funding from the Laura Spelman Rockefeller Memorial, which was part of a mission by the Rockefeller Foundation to promote social science research and improve child welfare, provided the department with resources to create a laboratory nursery school in which faculty and students conducted empirical research observing the behavior of children and parents. Because of its empirical focus on the home, the family, and children, which were considered women's activities during the time, faculty and students in the department were generally women. Given limited opportunities for programs of study for women during the first half the 20th century, the department offered a particular niche for women at Cornell and helped train a generation of educators, health care providers, and social workers.

In 1945, the department was renamed the Department of Child Development and Family Relationships. Along with the name change came a change in direction for the department as its funding support shifted to government grants and its empirical studies shifted from the laboratory nursery school to surrounding communities. In 1948, Bronfenbrenner joined the department and further expanded its reputation and impact. While a faculty member there, he published his ecological systems theory, which posited that human development unfolds in a nested set of systems, involving cultural, social, economic and political factors in addition to psychological factors. Bronfenbrenner's perspective transformed the study of human development and informed policies related to child development. Notably, Bronfenbrenner's congressional testimony in 1964 and subsequent work on a federal panel helped establish the federal Head Start program in 1965. His influence also shaped the direction and organization of the department and the college in which it was housed. In 1969, the department was renamed the Department of Human Development and Family Studies and Cornell's College of Home Economics was renamed the College of Human Ecology in recognition of Bronfenbrenner's theoretical contributions.

In 1998, the department dropped "Family Studies" from its name and became known just as the Department of Human Development. In part, this change reflected an increasing focus on development across the lifespan. Throughout this time, more male faculty joined the department and the number of male students increased. By 2018, the department had added foci in adolescence, emerging adulthood, adulthood, and aging to its early childhood development roots. Its study of contextual influences had expanded beyond the family to a variety of contexts, including peer groups, schools, neighborhoods, and workplaces, in part due to Bronfenbrenner's theoretical work. There were 25 professorial faculty and approximately 35 masters and doctoral students in residence spanning multiple disciplines and methodologies.

Interdisciplinarity was a defining feature of the department that drew expertise from diverse intellectual and scientific sources. Its mission to conduct interdisciplinary and integrative developmental science to understand the growing person in a changing world was carried out in three interrelated core areas - Law and Human Development, Health and Well-being, and Cognition in Context - that were problem-centered and organized around real-world issues. Some of its signal contributions – such as the creation of Head Start or the launch of the child-witness field – were the result of research syntheses across many of the social sciences as well as medicine, nutrition, and law. The department also placed a great emphasis from the very beginning on the public interests and applied values of research findings, which has motivated evidence-based translational research in modern times. The department promoted and celebrated diversity and inclusion, with one-third of its faculty being ethnic minorities and half of the faculty being women during its final years.

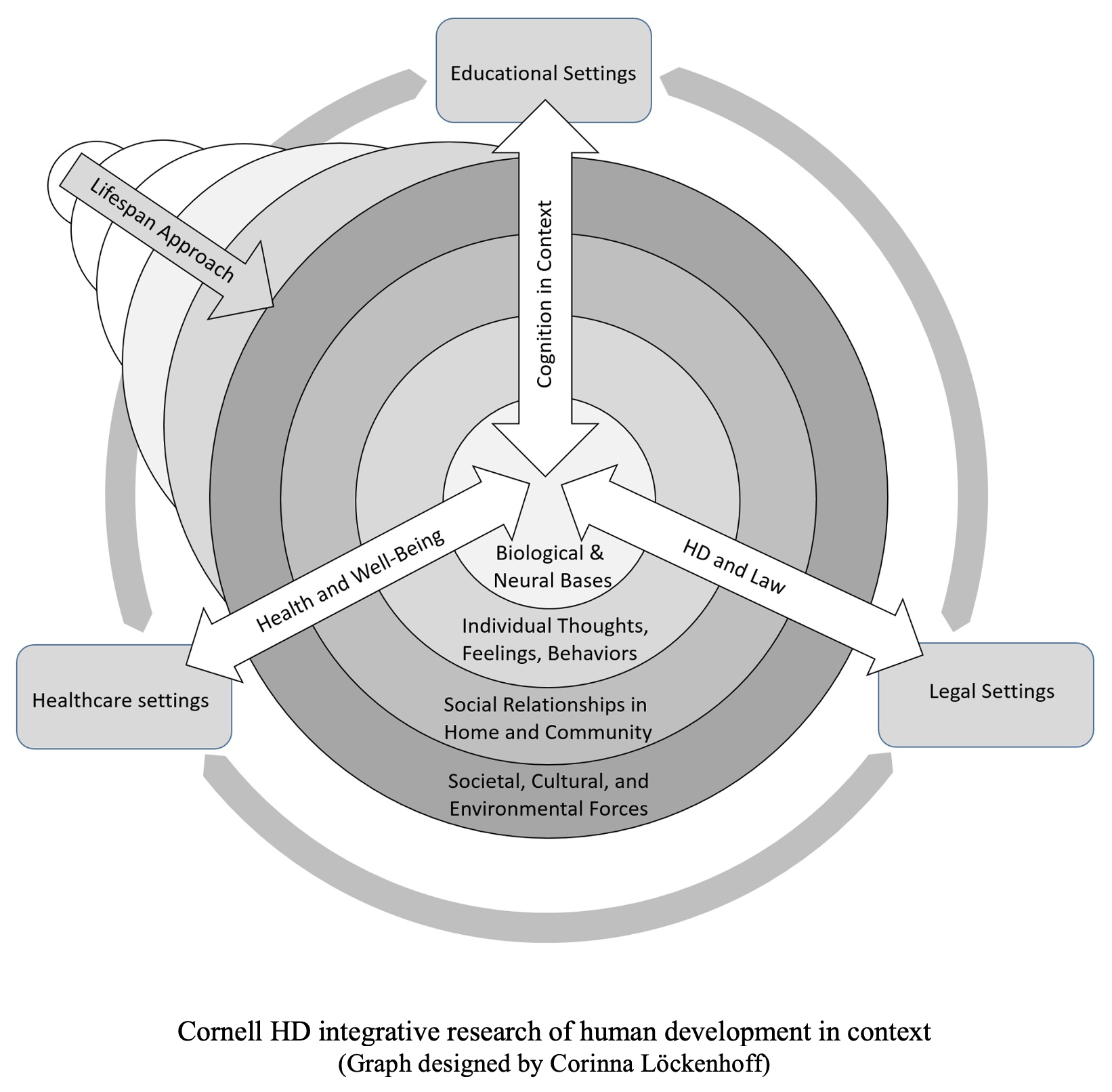
Cornell HD integrative research of human development in context

In July 2021, the Department of Human Development and Cornell's Department of Psychology underwent a merger into a cross-university "super-department" that only retained the Department of Psychology in its name. However, undergraduate students at Cornell can still major in Human Development. Human Development coursework at Cornell is organized into five areas of specialization that reflect the strengths of the former department: aging and health; cognitive development; human developmental behavioral neuroscience; psychology, law, and human development; and social and personality development. Human Development coursework also retains the former department's emphasis on the role that social factors, environment, and culture play in human development.

== Legacy and influence ==
The department's theoretical and empirical contributions reflect the critical perspectives faculty brought from multiple disciplines and can broadly be understood in terms of redefining ecological perspectives as the general field of psychology has developed. Kurt Lewin is often recognized as the father of modern social psychology and is credited with establishing field theory, which proposes that human behavior is a function of an individual's psychological environment, and advancing the study of group dynamics. Bronfenbrenner developed a fundamental theory of the ecology of human development that has shaped the subsequent study of human behavior and human environments . Robert Sternberg is credited with developing a triarchic theory of intelligence, which emphasizes intelligence beyond academic proficiency, and is a vocal critic of standardized testing. The work of Valerie F. Reyna and Charles Brainerd established fuzzy-trace theory, which is a theory of cognition proposed to explain false memory, medical decision making, and risk estimation among other phenomena, and provided practical implications for improving medical communication and eyewitness testimony.

Extension and translational work was an emphasis of the department from its early years . In the 1930s, faculty such as Ethel Waring translated data from empirical studies conducted in the laboratory nursery school in extension bulletins aimed at informing parents on the best child rearing practices. Faculty also educated mothers throughout New York state in Cornell Study Clubs. Faculty have served on federal panels and provided policy recommendations to government agencies, including Bronfenbrenner's work in establishing the Head Start program. Work by Stephen J. Ceci on child testimony and how law enforcement officials interact with children has shaped judicial policy. Work in the department also led to the development of a home visitation program for pregnant and new mothers that serves approximately 58,000 families a year in the United States and is shown to improve health outcomes for mothers and babies, prevent child abuse and improve children's academic outcomes.

== Scholars associated with Human Development at Cornell ==
- Charles Brainerd, psychologist
- Urie Bronfenbrenner, psychologist
- Joan Jacobs Brumberg, social historian
- Stephen J. Ceci, psychologist
- John Eckenrode, social psychologist
- Gary Evans, psychologist
- Lee C. Lee, psychologist
- Kurt Lewin, social psychologist
- Corinna Löckenhoff, psychologist, gerontologist
- Karl Pillemer, sociologist, gerontologist
- Valerie F. Reyna, psychologist
- Henry Ricciuti, developmental psychologist
- Ritch Savin-Williams, psychologist
- Robert J. Sternberg, psychologist, psychometrician
- Ethel Waring, developmental psychologist
- Qi Wang, psychologist
- Elaine Wethington, sociologist, gerontologist
- Wendy M. Williams, psychologist

== Notable graduates from Human Development at Cornell ==
- Nicole Alexander-Scott, former director of the Rhode Island Department of Health
- Jay Belsky, developmental psychologist
- Niall Bolger, social psychologist
- Joyce Brothers, psychologist, television personality, writer
- Joseph Campos, developmental psychologist
- Avshalom Caspi, psychologist
- Lisa M. Diamond, psychologist, feminist
- Geraldine Downey, social psychologist
- Roberta Michnick Golinkoff, developmental psychologist
- Laurence Steinberg, developmental psychologist
