= Qi Wang (psychologist) =

Chinese-born psychologist

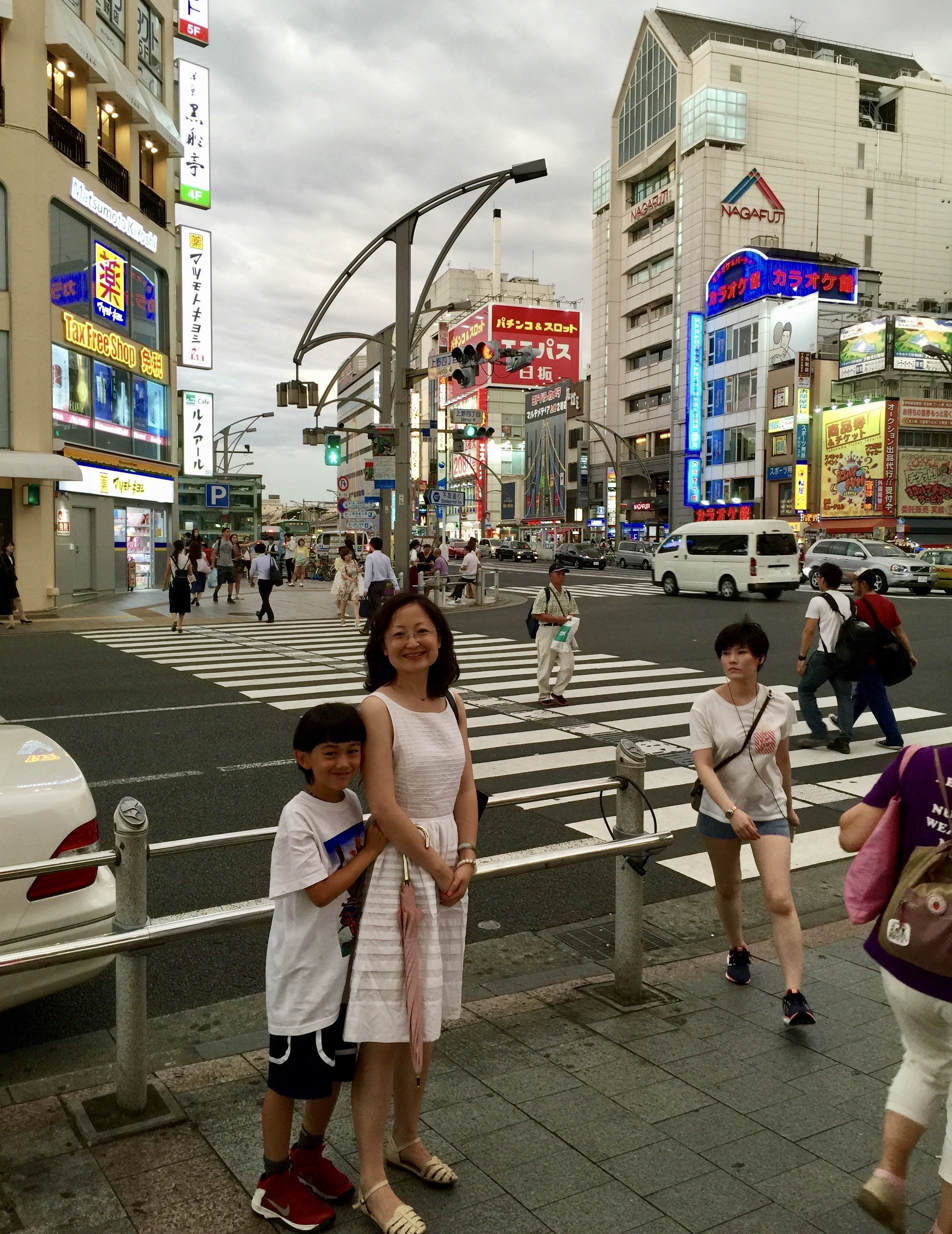
- Born: Chongqing, China
- Education: Peking University; Harvard University
- Scientific career
- Fields: Human Development, Psychology, and Cognitive Science
- Workplaces: Cornell University

Qi Wang (Chinese: 王琪) is a Chinese-born American psychologist, professor, and author who is best known for her study of memory in the context of culture and technology. She holds a lifetime endowed chair in human development at Cornell University. Wang is a Fellow of the Association for Psychological Science and the Psychonomic Society. She is also a member of the American Psychological Association, the Society for Research in Child Development, the Cognitive Development Society, the International Society for the Study of Behavioral Development, and the Society for Applied Research in Memory and Cognition. She serves on many editorial boards and is the Editor-in-Chief of the Journal of Applied Research in Memory and Cognition. She directs the Culture & Cognition Lab at Cornell.

== Biography ==
Qi Wang was born in Chongqing, China. Both of her parents were senior engineers before retirement. Her choice of becoming a psychologist was influenced by her aunt, a psychology professor at a Chinese university. Wang received her undergraduate degree in psychology from Peking University. She went on to earn her Ph.D. in psychology (with a minor in anthropology) in 2000 at Harvard University. Her academic advisors were Michelle Leichtman and Sheldon White. Wang’s dissertation, “Culture, self, and emotion: An integrative perspective on the development of autobiographical memory,” won the James McKeen Cattell Award for outstanding dissertation in psychology from the New York Academy of Sciences. Wang subsequently joined the Cornell Human Development faculty as an assistant professor and became a full professor in 2011. In July 2017, Wang was named Chair of the Department of Human Development. Cornell Human Development is a top developmental science department in the United States, known for its interdisciplinary and integrative research of development across the lifespan and being associated with many intellectual giants including Urie Bronfenbrenner. Wang is the first person-of-color to chair the Department since it was founded in 1925. During her term, Wang launched many initiatives to maintain and enhance the academic distinction and inclusion of the Department, and she created a blueprint for what has later become the Cornell Center for Integrative Developmental Science. Wang served as the Department Chair until July 2021, when the Department was made to merge with the psychology department to strengthen Cornell psychology.

== Research ==
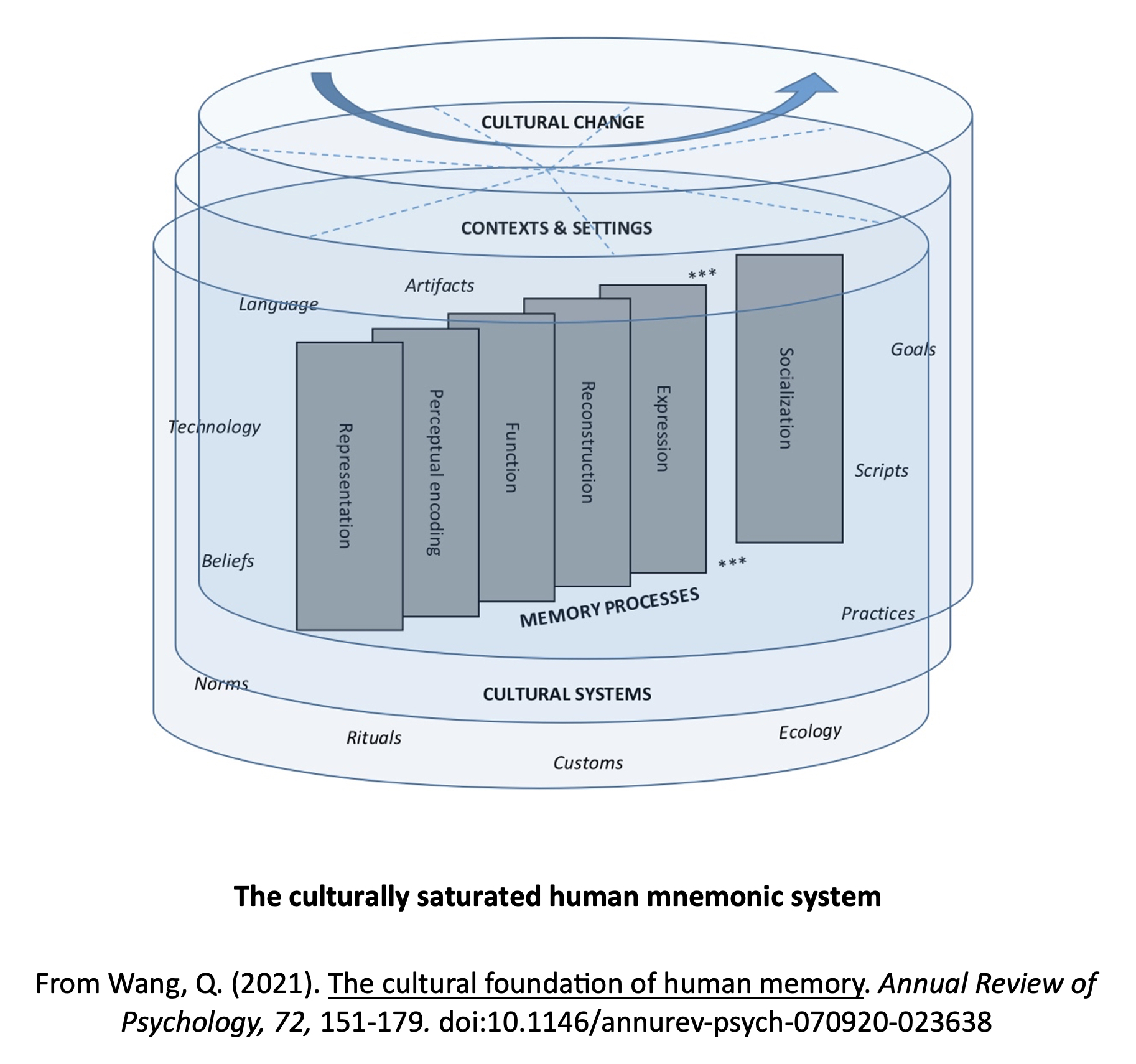
The culturally saturated human mnemonic system

Wang proposes a cultural dynamic theory of autobiographical memory, arguing that memory is not simply a product of the mind or brain but instead a social-cultural construction. Her research reveals that people from different cultures often show diverse ways of remembering their past experiences: They differ in what to remember, how to remember, and why to remember it. These cultural differences in memory emerge early in childhood and persist across the lifespan. Her work further shows that these differences stem from the influences of a variety of cultural elements such as cultural self-construal, perceptual encoding, language, emotion cognition, and mnemonic practices. Wang details a model of a culturally saturated mnemonic system in which cultural elements constitute and condition various processes of remembering.

Wang also studies childhood amnesia (or infantile amnesia), a phenomenon in which adults show inability to recall memories from the earliest years of life. She and Carole Peterson observed that when remembering early childhood experiences, both children and adults systematically date the events at later ages than they actually were - a telescoping bias. This finding has critical implications for the theoretical explanation for childhood amnesia. Furthermore, her research reveals cultural differences in childhood amnesia, whereby Westerners recall earlier, more numerous, more self-focused, and more emotionally laden childhood memories than do East Asians.

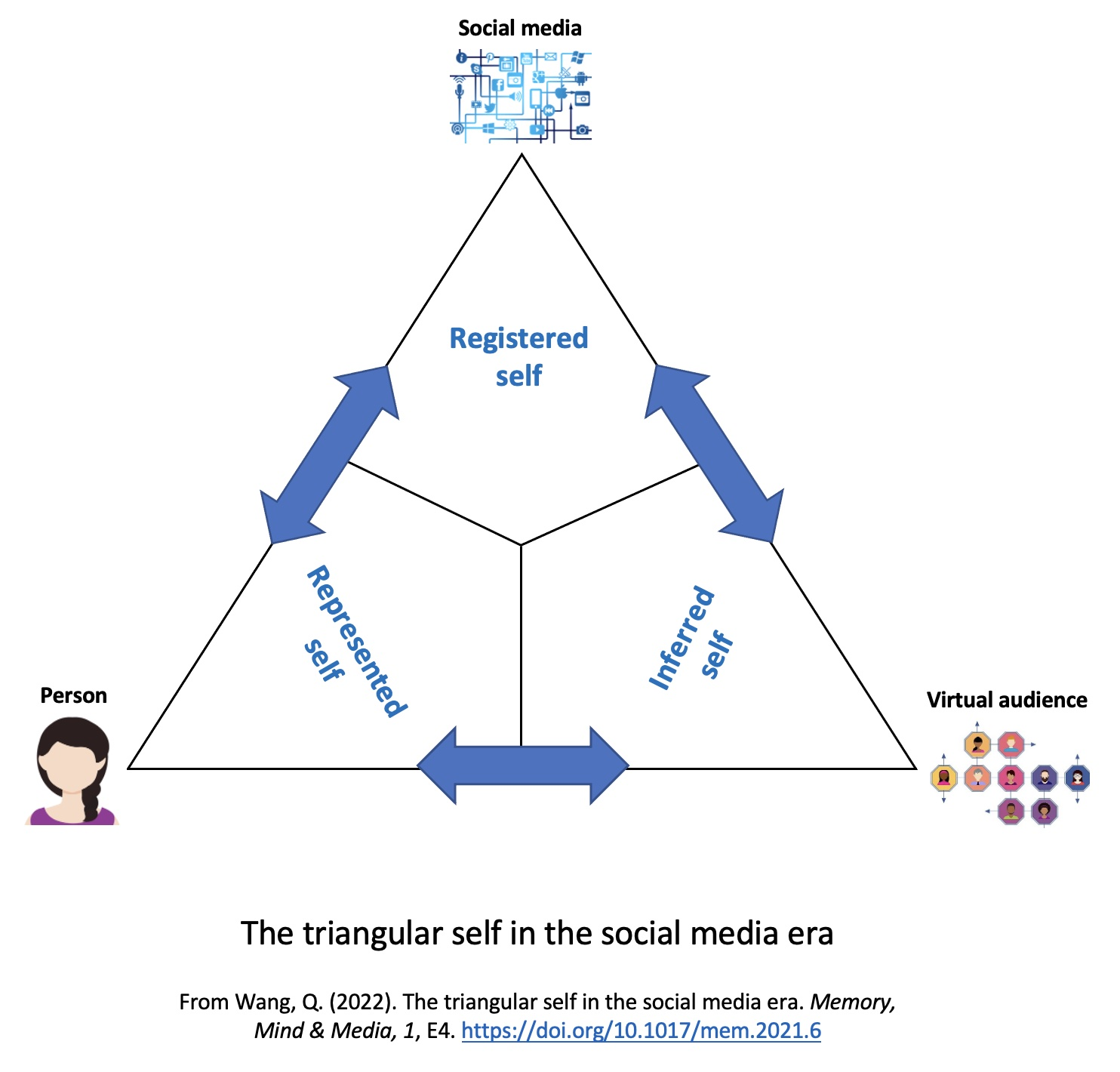
The triangular self in the social media era

Wang further leads the research effort to understand the impact of the Internet and social media as a cultural force on memory. She suggests that the public, interactive, and immediate nature of online posting changes what and how individuals remember about their experiences and further shapes their sense of self and identity. Studies by Wang and her colleagues show that whereas sharing personal information (e.g., a recent family trip) online leads to better memory for the information, sharing public information (e.g., by reposting or retweeting news) results in impoverished recall. Wang proposes a triangular theory of self in the era of social media - the represented self in the private mind, the registered self on social media platforms, and the inferred self by the virtual audience - that introduces new ways to understand and study memory and self in our digitally mediated society.

In addition to studying memory, Wang has undertaken extensive studies to examine future thinking, self-concept, and emotion knowledge in cultural contexts, the influence of the Internet and social media on human behavior, and the relation of socio-cognitive processes to psychological well-being.

Wang emphasizes the pivotal role of culture in shaping mind and behavior. She urges psychologists to take culture into account in their research so as to eliminate culture-bound biases and build a true psychological science. Using a multi-level analysis approach, her research demonstrates the many ways in which culture and mind interact.

== Publications ==
Wang has frequently published in scientific journals and in volumes of collected works. Her single-authored book, The Autobiographical Self in Time and Culture, is regarded as a definitive work on culture and autobiographical memory. Her most recent theoretical synthesis of the influence of culture on human memory can be found in the Annual Review of Psychology. Her newly edited volume (w/ Andrew Hoskins), The Remaking of Memory in the Age of the Internet and Social Media (OUP, 2024), offers new interdisciplinary inquiry into the multiple ways in which digital apps, platforms and services, remake individual, social and cultural memory. Wang’s work has been featured in media outlets such as Forbes, The Wall Street Journal, New York Times, BBC, PBS, and The New Yorker. To translate research findings for the general public, Wang has written a book (Peking University Press, 2015) on parenting, 哈佛宝宝养育录 (Raising a Harvard Baby: One Hundred Practices of Successful Childrearing), that integrates positive childrearing practices from Western and Asian cultures. She also maintains a blog “Time Travel Across Borders” in Psychology Today.

Wang received the Young Scientist Award from the International Society for Study of Behavioral Development (2006), the Award for Distinguished Contributions to Early Research from the Society for Research in Child Development (2005), the Outstanding Contribution to Research Award from SRCD Asian Caucus (2013), and the SUNY Chancellor's Award for Excellence in Scholarship and Creative Activities (2022).
