= Soren Kaplan =

American writer

- Born: November 27, 1968 (age 57)
- Education: University of California, Los Angeles

Soren Marcus Kaplan (born November 27, 1968) is an author, consultant, and speaker on the subject of innovation and innovation culture in organizations. He is an Affiliate at the Center for Effective Organizations at the University of Southern California's Marshall School of Business, founder of the consulting firm InnovationPoint, co-founder of the software company Praxie.com, and is a columnist for the Innovate column of Inc. Magazine.

== Early life and career ==
Soren Kaplan was born on 27 November 1968. In 1996 he jointly wrote an article for the Journal of Creativity & Innovation Management under the title of "Harnessing the Power of Strategic Innovation". In 2001, Kaplan co-founded iCohere, Inc. with his father Pascal, an online learning and collaboration platform. In 2017 the Thinkers50 named Kaplan one of the world's leading experts in business strategy and innovation. In 2020 Business Insider listed Kaplan as one of the top "power players" of the management consulting industry. Kaplan holds a Bachelor of Arts Degree in Sociology from UCLA and obtained a master's degree and Ph.D. in Organizational Psychology with an emphasis on leadership, innovation, and organizational culture from Alliant International University.

== Author ==
=== Leapfrogging ===
In 2012, Kaplan's first book Leapfrogging: Harness the Power of Surprise for Business Breakthroughs, outlined his observations on why the power of surprise is so important for innovation. Leapfrogging, received Best Leadership Book by the Axiom Book Awards. In a 2013 article in the Wall Street Journal titled "The Mystery of the Book Sales Spike How Are Some Authors Landing On Best-Seller Lists? They're Buying Their Way", Jeffrey A. Trachtenberg noted that Soren's first book, Leapfrogging entered the Journal's list of best-selling business books immediately and the next week "plunged 99% and it fell off the list". Kaplan told the Journal that he had retained ResultSource to promote the book and "purchased about 2,500 books through ResultSource, paying about $22 a book, including shipping, for a total of about $55,000. Mr. Kaplan says he also paid ResultSource a fee in the range of $20,000 to $30,000." Kaplan's interview with Trachtenberg and subsequent articles on the topic have continued to be referenced by media outlets when describing the dynamics of bestseller book marketing. Following this article, Kaplan became the first bestselling business author to publicly share details of how the book publishing industry has become increasingly reliant on pre-sales of books to influence the New York Times and Wall Street Journal's bestseller lists. Jeff Bercovici reported in Forbes that Kaplan shared his reservations about marketing his book using this strategy, quoting Kaplan as saying "It's no wonder few people in the industry want to talk about bestseller campaigns. Put bluntly, they allow people with enough money, contacts, and know-how to buy their way onto bestseller lists."

=== Invisible Advantage ===
His second book, The Invisible Advantage: How to Create a Culture of Innovation (2017), was awarded Best General Business Book by the International Book Awards. Kaplan's books have been recognized as the top business and leadership books of the years when published, and other innovation experts have since referred to Kaplan's "The Invisible Advantage" as a "classic" when it comes to outlining what businesses need to do to create a continuous culture of innovation.

=== Experiential Intelligence ===
Kaplan's third book, Experiential Intelligence: Harness the Power of Experience for Personal and Business Breakthroughs (2023), proposes that life experience contributes to intelligence at a level on par with IQ (intellect) and EQ (emotional intelligence). Kaplan's ideas draw upon the original theory set forth by Robert Sternberg in his Triarchic Theory of Intelligence. Kaplan's book has been recognized as advancing the concept of Experiential Intelligence and has been referenced in articles in Harvard Business Review, Psychology Today, Forbes, Fast Company, CNBC and on National Public Radio's Technation radio program. In 2023, the International Book Awards named Experiential Intelligence as a finalist for best book of the year in two categories, Management and Leadership and General Business, and the AmericanBookFest awards recognized Kaplan's book as Best General Business book of the year.

=== Other works ===
He is a columnist for the Innovate column of Inc. Magazine, Psychology Today, contributes to Fast Company Magazine and has written articles for the Harvard Business Review website. In addition to critiquing the publishing industry, Kaplan has since critiqued other industries’ business models including management consulting, media, and healthcare.

== Recognition & awards ==
Kaplan was ranked 24 out of 40 in the blog Innovation Excellence "Top 40 Innovation Bloggers of 2017." Kaplan's ideas are discussed in The International Handbook on Innovation by Larisa V. Shavinina. He has also appeared as a speaker at TEDx Bay Area.

== Personal life ==
Kaplan lives in the San Francisco Bay Area with his wife and two daughters.
