= Journal of Applied Research in Memory and Cognition =

- Discipline: Cognitive psychology, cognitive science
- Language: English
- Edited by: Qi Wang

Publication details
- History: 2012-present
- Publisher: American Psychological Association on behalf of the Society for Applied Research in Memory and Cognition
- Frequency: Quarterly
- Impact factor: 4.600 (2021)

Standard abbreviations
- ISO 4: J. Appl. Res. Mem. Cogn.

Indexing
- ISSN: 2211-3681 (print); 2211-369X (web)
- LCCN: 2013243254
- OCLC no.: 792974717

Links
- Journal homepage; Online archive

The Journal of Applied Research in Memory and Cognition is a quarterly peer-reviewed scientific journal covering the study of memory and cognition. It was established in 2012 and is published by the American Psychological Association (formerly published by Elsevier) on behalf of the Society for Applied Research in Memory and Cognition, of which it is the official journal. The founding editor-in-chief was Ronald Fisher (Florida International University), followed by Paula Hertel (Trinity University). The current editor-in-chief is Qi Wang (Cornell University). According to the Journal Citation Reports, the journal has a 2021 impact factor of 4.600.
