= Nancy Eisenberg =

American psychologist and scholar (born 1950)

- Born: 1950 (age 75–76)

Nancy Eisenberg (born 1950) is an American psychologist known for her pioneering research on prosocial behavior, empathy, sympathy, moral development, emotion socialization, and self-regulation in children and adolescents. She is Regents Professor emeritus in the Department of Psychology at Arizona State University and is widely recognized as one of the most influential developmental psychologists of her generation. She is ranked among the most-cited scientists globally on Research.com. Her work helped establish the distinction between empathy, sympathy, and personal distress and shaped contemporary theories of emotional and social development.

== Education ==
Eisenberg obtained her B.A. degree in psychology in 1972 from University of Michigan and continued her education to obtain a M.A. (1975) and a Ph.D. (1976) in developmental psychology from the University of California, Berkeley, where she trained under developmental psychologist Paul Mussen.

== Career ==
In 1976, she joined Arizona State University as an assistant professor of psychology and remained there throughout her academic career, eventually becoming Regents Professor in 1991. She also held visiting and adjunct appointments at institutions including the University of Oregon, Oregon State University, the Max Planck Institute in Berlin, Sapienza University of Rome, and the University of Otago in New Zealand.

Eisenberg served in numerous leadership roles in psychology organizations. She was President of the Association for Psychological Science (2014–2015), President of Division 7 (Developmental Psychology) of the American Psychological Association, and President of the Western Psychological Association. She served as associate editor for several major journals, such as Developmental Psychology and American Psychologist. Notably, she was named the first female editor of Psychological Bulletin in 1996 and was the founding editor of Child Development Perspectives in 2007.

== Research contributions ==
Eisenberg's research transformed scientific understanding of children's emotional and moral development. Beginning in the 1970s, she conducted foundational studies on prosocial moral reasoning, altruism, and empathy-related responding. Her work demonstrated that sympathy and empathic concern are positively associated with helping behavior, whereas personal distress is often unrelated or negatively related to prosocial behavior.

She was among the first developmental psychologists to combine observational, physiological, behavioral, and self-report methods in the study of children's emotional responses. Her research on empathy and prosocial behavior became foundational within developmental, social, clinical, and personality psychology.

Eisenberg also made major theoretical and empirical contributions to the study of self-regulation and effortful control. Along with Richard Fabes and colleagues, she argued that children's social competence depends heavily on emotional regulation and coping abilities. Findings from this work led to decades of research on the role of individual differences in emotionality and top-down self-regulation (including effortful control) in children's and adolescents’’ adjustment and maladjustment. Across multiple longitudinal studies, Eisenberg and colleagues found that self-regulation consistently positively predicted positive developmental outcomes. This work helped establish children's regulation as a central construct in developmental science.

In 1998, Eisenberg, Cumberland, and Spinrad proposed a highly influential heuristic model of emotion-related socialization that explained how parenting practices influence children's emotional competence, adjustment, and psychopathology. The framework became one of the most widely cited models in the emotion socialization literature and influenced decades of research on parenting and emotional development.

Her research has been international through collaborations examining prosociality, regulation, emotionality, self-efficacy, personality resiliency, parenting, and developmental adjustment. She has published with collaborators from countries, including an ongoing, extensive collaboration with colleagues from the University of Rome, Sapienza.

Notable achievements for her work include APA Distinguished Scientific Contribution Award, G. Stanley Hall Award for Distinguished Contribution to Developmental Psychology 2009 and William James Fellow Award for Career Contributions in the Basic Science of Psychology in 2011.

=== Influence and Impact ===
Eisenberg is among the most highly cited developmental psychologists in the world. Research.com identified her as a top female scientist (across all fields), and in 2026 ranking 57th most cited psychologists in the world (31st in the United States). According to Google Scholar, her publications have received more than 150,000 citations. Several of her publications have been cited thousands of times and are considered landmark contributions to psychology.

=== Publications ===
Nancy Eisenberg has written and contributed to a large number of publications and research studies. A full comprehensive list of her publications can be found online.

Selected Journal Publications

Eisenberg, N., Spinrad, T. L., & Knafo-Noam, A. (2015). Prosocial Development. In R. M. Lerner (Ed.), Handbook of Child Psychology and Developmental Science (pp. 1–47). John Wiley & Sons, Inc. https://doi.org/10.1002/9781118963418.childpsy315

Eisenberg, N. (2000). Emotion, regulation, and moral development. Annual Review of Psychology, 51(1), 665–697. https://doi.org/10.1146/annurev.psych.51.1.665

Eisenberg, N., Cumberland, A., & Spinrad, T. L. (1998). Parental socialization of emotion. Psychological Inquiry, 9(4), 241–273. https://doi.org/10.1207/s15327965pli0904_1

Eisenberg, N., & Miller, P. A. (1987). The relation of empathy to prosocial and related behaviors. Psychological Bulletin, 101(1), 91–119. https://doi.org/10.1037/0033-2909.101.1.91

Selected Books

Eisenberg, N. Vol. Ed. (2006). W. Damon & R. M. Lerner, Series Eds. Handbook of child psychology. Vol. 3. Social, personality, and social development (6th ed). New York: Wiley

Eisenberg, N. (Ed.) (1998). Handbook of child psychology. Vol. 3: Socialization, personality, and social development (5thEd.). New York: Wiley.

Eisenberg, N. (1992). The caring child. Harvard University Press (also in Japanese).

Eisenberg, N., & Mussen, P. (1989). The roots of prosocial behavior in children. Cambridge, England: Cambridge University Press. Also published in Japanese by Kaneko Shobo Publisher, 1991.

Eisenberg, N., & Strayer, J. (Eds.) (1987). Empathy and its development. Cambridge University Press. (Translated into Spanish)

Eisenberg, N. (1986). Altruistic emotion, cognition, and behavior. Hillsdale, N.J: Erlbaum.

Eisenberg, N. (Ed.) (1982). The development of prosocial behavior. New York: Academic Press.

Mussen, P., & Eisenberg‑Berg, N. (1977). Roots of caring, sharing, and helping: The development of prosocial behavior in children. San Francisco: Freeman. (Translated into German and Japanese, Kaneko Publishers.)

== Mentorship ==
Eisenberg mentored numerous undergraduate students, graduate students, postdoctoral scholars, and early-career faculty members who later became prominent researchers in developmental psychology and related disciplines. She involved trainees extensively in research, grants, publications, and longitudinal studies.

Many of her publications included students and early-career collaborators, and several generations of scholars trained under her went on to hold faculty positions and leadership roles in psychology.

== Awards ==
- APA Distinguished Scientific Contribution Award (2024)
- Distinguished Scientific Contributions to Child Development Award, Society for Research in Child Development (2015)
- Ernest R. Hilgard Award for Contributions in General Psychology, Including "The Division 1" by the American Psychological Association (2007)
- International Society for the Study of Behavioral Development Distinguished Scientific Contribution Award (2008)
- G. Stanley Hall Award for Distinguished Contribution to Developmental Psychology (2009)
- William James Fellow Award for Career Contributions in the Basic Science of Psychology (2011)
- Research Awards awarded by the National Institutes of Health NICHD and NiMH6.
- Regents Professor, Arizona State University

== Additional sources ==
1. Gal, S. D. E., Spinrad, T. L., Eisenberg, N., & Sulik, M. J. (2018). The relations of children's emotion knowledge to their observed social play and reticent/uninvolved behavior in preschool: Moderation by effortful control. Social Development.
2. Zhang, L., Eggum-Wilkens, N. D., Eisenberg, N., & Spinrad, T. L. (2017). Children's shyness, peer acceptance, and academic achievement in the early school years. Merrill-Palmer Quarterly, 63(4), 458–484.
3. Eisenberg, N. (1986). Altruistic Emotion, Cognition, and Behavior (PLE: Emotion) (1st ed., Vol. 1). London: Taylor & Francis Group. Doi:9781317597421
4. Eisenberg, N., Cumberland, A., Spinrad, T. L., Fabes, R. A., Shepard, S. A., Reiser, M., . . . Guthrie, I. K. (2001). The Relations of Regulation and Emotionality to Children's Externalizing and Internalizing Problem Behavior. Child Development, 72(4), 1112-1134. doi:10.1111/1467-8624.00337
5. Nancy Eisenberg, Tracy Spinrad. Emotion-related regulation: Sharpening the definition. Child Development (2004).
6. Carlos Valiente, R Fabes, Nancy Eisenberg, Tracy Spinrad. The relations of parental expressivity and support to children's coping with daily stress. Journal of Family Psychology (2004).
7. Eisenberg, N., Eggum, N. D., & Edwards, A. Empathy-related responding and moral development. Emotions, aggression, and moral development (2010). Award for Distinguished Scientific Contributions: Nancy Eisenberg. (2024). American Psychologist, 79(9), 1252–1254. https://doi.org/10.1037/amp0001400 · Eisenberg, N. (2014). Following the data (and sometimes theory): The career of a socioemotional developmental scientist. In R. M. Lerner, A. C. Petersen, R. K. Silbereisen, & J. Brooks-Gunn, (Eds.), The developmental science of adolescence: History through autobiography (pp. 124-133). New York: Psychology Press. · Eisenberg, N. (1996). In search of the good heart. In M. R. Merrens & G. G. Brannigan (Eds.), The developmental psychologists: Research adventures across the lifespan (pp. 89-104). New York: McGraw Hill.
