= Child development (disambiguation) =

Child development is the biological, psychological and emotional change that occurs in human beings between birth and the end of adolescence.

Child development may also refer to:

- Child Development (journal)

== See also ==
- Developmental psychology
