= Valerie F. Reyna =

American psychologist

- Born: 1955 (age 70–71)
- Education: B.A., Clark University; PhD, Rockefeller University
- Occupation: Professor of Human Development at Cornell University

Valerie F. Reyna (born 1955) is an American psychologist and Professor of Human Development at Cornell University and an expert on false memory and risky decision making.

In collaboration with her husband Charles Brainerd, Reyna developed fuzzy-trace theory, a dual-process model of mental representations underlying memory, judgement, and decision making. According to fuzzy-trace theory, there are two independent types of memory traces: a verbatim trace that records the exact details and a gist trace that extracts general features. Brainerd and Reyna used fuzzy-trace theory to provide a comprehensive account of the phenomenon of false memory, where individuals recall events or details of events that did not happen; their work on this topic and that of others is summarized in their co-authored volume The Science of False Memory. Reyna and other colleagues have co-edited books on risky decision making and adolescent cognition including The Neuroscience of Risky Decision Making, The Adolescent Brain: Learning, Reasoning, and Decision Making, and Neuroeconomics, Judgment, and Decision Making.

Reyna is a Fellow of the Society of Experimental Psychologists, and Charter Fellow of the Association for Psychological Science and Member of the National Academy of Sciences. She served as president of the Society for Judgment and Decision Making and on the governing board of the Psychonomic Society. Reyna received the SUNY Chancellor's Award for Excellence in Scholarship and Creative Activities in 2012 and the Hispanic Professional Action Committee Woman of the Year Award in 2001.

== Biography ==
Reyna received her B.A in psychology from Clark University (Summa Cum Laude) in 1976. She continued her education at Rockefeller University, completing her PhD in Experimental Psychology with qualifications in Linguistics and in Statistics in 1981. After a post-doctoral fellowship at Educational Testing Service, Reyna joined the faculty of the University of Texas at Dallas where she remained until 1987. Subsequently, Reyna joined the faculty of the University of Arizona and was promoted to Professor in 2000 while affiliated with the Departments of Surgery, Medicine, Biomedical Engineering, Mexican-American Studies, and Women's Studies. Reyna moved to the University of Texas at Arlington in 2003 as Professor of Psychology. Professor of Human Development at Cornell University since 2005, she is the director of the Human Neuroscience Institute, the co-director of the Center for Behavioral Economics and Decision Research and the co-director for the Cornell University Magnetic Resonance Imaging Facility at Cornell.

== Research ==
Reyna's research program adopts a cognitive neuroscience perspective on topics pertaining to judgement, decision making, and memory over the life span. In collaborative work with Brainerd, Reyna focused on how emotions can distort memories, especially for events that have negative emotions associated with them. To account for why people often remember things that never happened (i.e., experience false memory or memory illusions), fuzzy-trace theory proposes that verbatim and gist memories are stored separately and activated in parallel. Verbatim memory stores a detailed representation of the event at the same time as gist memory captures its general features. After a couple of days, the representation stored in verbatim memory is typically lost, while the gist remains accessible and can be further interpreted. Reyna and Brainerd have suggested adults make connections and rely on their gist memory to a greater extent than children, making them more susceptible to false memories under some circumstances (e.g., in experiments using the Deese-Roediger-McDermott paradigm). Their research findings challenge the widely held view that susceptibility to memory distortion declines from childhood into adulthood, and have implications for research on the reliability of eyewitness testimony.

In applications of fuzzy-trace theory to risky decision making, Reyna and her colleagues distinguish "rational" decision-making, involving deliberate analysis of trade offs between risks and benefits, and nondeliberative reactions, in which the gist of the situation cues action. As youth develop into adolescents and young adults, they are increasingly likely to rely on intuitive gist-based responding, and less likely to engage in rational consideration of risks. Reyna disagrees with the view that adolescents underestimate risks and have a sense of invulnerability. Rather, it is their tendency to respond intuitively to contextual cues and their motivation to maximize immediate pleasure that leads adolescents to engage in risky behaviors involving sexual activity, reckless driving, smoking, drug and alcohol use, and the like.

== Select publications ==
- Reyna, V. F.; Brainerd, C. J. (1995). "Fuzzy-trace theory: An interim synthesis". Learning and Individual Differences. 7 (1): 1–75. doi:10.1016/1041-6080(95)90031-4.
- Reyna, V. F.; Farley, F. (2006). "Risk and rationality in adolescent decision making: Implications for theory, practice, and public policy". Psychological Science in the Public Interest. 7 (1): 1–44. doi:10.1111/j.1529-1006.2006.00026.x. PMID 26158695.
- Reyna, V. F.; Nelson, W. L.; Han, P. K.; Dieckmann, N. F. (2009). "How numeracy influences risk comprehension and medical decision making". Psychological Bulletin. 135 (6): 943–973. doi:10.1037/a0017327. PMC 2844786. PMID 19883143.
