= Monographs of the Society for Research in Child Development =

- Discipline: Developmental psychology
- Language: English
- Edited by: Ginger A. Moore

Publication details
- History: 1935-present
- Publisher: Wiley-Blackwell on behalf of the Society for Research in Child Development
- Frequency: Quarterly
- Impact factor: 2.245 (2017)

Standard abbreviations
- ISO 4: Monogr. Soc. Res. Child Dev.

Indexing
- CODEN: MSCDA7
- ISSN: 0037-976X (print); 1540-5834 (web)
- LCCN: e37000123
- OCLC no.: 1554212

Links
- Journal homepage; Online access; Online archive; Journal page at society's website

The Monographs of the Society for Research in Child Development is a peer-reviewed academic journal published quarterly by Wiley-Blackwell. It is one of three journals published on behalf of the Society for Research in Child Development. The editor-in-chief is Ginger A. Moore (Pennsylvania State University). Each issue of Monographs contains a report on one single large-scale study or a group of papers on a common theme, often supplemented with an outside commentary.

According to the Journal Citation Reports, the journal has a 2021 impact factor of 7.2, ranking it 10th out of 61 journals in the category "Psychology, Developmental".

== See also ==
- List of psychology journals
