= Tereasa Brainerd =

American astronomer

Tereasa Gail Brainerd (born 1964) is an American astronomer whose interests include galaxy clusters, satellite galaxies, and gravitational lensing. Educated in Canada and the US, she works in the US as a professor of astronomy at Boston University.

== Education and career ==
Brainerd is the daughter of psychologist Charles Brainerd and audiologist Susan Haske. She was born in St. Johns, Michigan, in 1964, but moved to Edmonton, Alberta with her family as a child. She became an undergraduate at the University of Alberta, where she earned a bachelor's degree in 1987. She went to Ohio State University for graduate study in astronomy, completing her Ph.D. in 1992. Her dissertation, A Study of Properties of Dark Galaxy Halos in a CDM Universe using N-body Simulations, was supervised by Jens Villumsen.

After postdoctoral research at the California Institute of Technology and Los Alamos National Laboratory, she joined the Boston University astronomy department faculty in 1995. She directed the Institute for Astrophysical Research from 2005 to 2011, and chaired the department from 2011 to 2015 and 2016 to 2018. She was promoted to full professor in 2023.

== Recognition ==
In 2023 the American Astronomical Society (AAS) named Brainerd as a Fellow of the AAS, "for pioneering work in the use of weak gravitational lensing to measure the structure of individual galaxies; significant service to the Society in committee roles and on the Board of Trustees; and leading the Institute for Astrophysical Research and the Department of Astronomy at Boston University to a significant expansion in research in observational astronomy".
