= Charles Brainerd =

American psychologist and researcher

- Born: 1944 (age 81–82)
- Education: Michigan State University
- Known for: Fuzzy-trace theory
- Spouse: Valerie F. Reyna
- Awards: Member of the National Academy of Education since 2017
- Scientific career
- Fields: Cognitive psychology Developmental psychology
- Workplaces: University of Windsor; University of Alberta; University of Arizona; Cornell University
- Thesis: The construction of the formal operations of implication-reasoning and proportionality in children and adolescents (1970)

Charles Jon Brainerd (born 1944) is an American psychologist and professor in the College of Human Ecology at Cornell University. He is known for developing fuzzy-trace theory with his wife and colleague, Valerie F. Reyna. He serves as editor-in-chief of the peer-reviewed scientific journal Developmental Review.

== Education and career ==
Brainerd was educated at Michigan State University. His first academic appointment was as an assistant professor at the University of Windsor from 1970 to 1971. He served on the faculty of the University of Alberta from 1971, initially as an assistant professor, before being promoted to associate professor there in 1973. 1976 to 1983, he was a professor at the University of Western Ontario. In 1983, he returned to the University of Alberta to become the Henry Marshall Tory Professor and Director Center for Research in Child Development there. He was a professor of educational psychology at the University of Arizona from 1987 to 1997, and taught Special Education, Rehabilitation, and School Psychology there from 1997 to 2004. After a one-year stint teaching psychology at the University of Texas, he joined the human development faculty of Cornell in 2005.

== Honors and awards ==
Brainerd is a member of the National Academy of Education, as well as a Fellow of the American Psychological Association's Division of General Psychology, Division of Experimental Psychology, Division of Developmental Psychology, and Division of Educational Psychology. He is also a Fellow of the American Psychological Society and the Psychonomic Society. He has received the Spirit of Excellence Award from the Governor of Arizona.

== Personal life ==
Brainerd's daughter, Tereasa Brainerd, is an astronomer.
