= Lee C. Lee =

Chinese-American psychologist

- Born: July 19, 1935; Suzhou, China
- Died: April 30, 2006 (aged 70); Ithaca, New York
- Occupation: Professor Emerita

Academic background
- Education: Ohio State University

Academic work
- Discipline: Developmental psychology, Asian-American studies
- Institutions: Cornell University
- Notable works: Handbook of Asian American Psychology (1st ed.)

Lee Charlotte Lee (July 19, 1935 – April 30, 2006) was a Chinese American psychologist. She was a Professor Emerita of Human Development in the College of Human Ecology at Cornell University. Lee was the first woman of Asian ancestry to become a tenured professor at Cornell.

== Biography ==
Lee was born in Suzhou, China, in 1935. She attended Mount Union College, in Ohio, on a full scholarship. She graduated with a Bachelor of Arts degree in psychology and mathematics in 1957. She went on to attend Ohio State University, completing a Master's degree in clinical psychology in 1959 and a Ph.D. in developmental psychology in 1968.

Lee joined the faculty at Cornell University in 1968, becoming the institution's first woman professor of Asian ancestry. In 1987, she became the founding director of Cornell's Asian American Studies Program. At Cornell, Lee taught courses and conducted research in developmental psychology and in Asian-American identity and history.

With Nolan W. Zane, she was the co-editor of the first edition of The Handbook of Asian American Psychology, published in 1998.

While a Fulbright scholar at the Chinese University of Hong Kong from 1992 through 1994, Lee became the founding director of the Hong Kong-American Center. The mission of the Center is to promote cross-cultural understanding between Hong Kong and American communities.

Lee retired from Cornell in 2004.

In 2006, she died at her home in Ithaca, New York, at the age of 70.

== Selected works ==
- Spilton, Doreen; Lee, Lee C. (1977). "Some Determinants of Effective Communication in Four-Year-Olds". Child Development. 48 (3): 968. doi:10.2307/1128348. JSTOR 1128348.
- Lee, Lee C. (1979). "Is social competence independent of cultural context?". American Psychologist. 34 (9): 795–796. doi:10.1037/0003-066X.34.9.795.
- Lee, Lee C. (1992). "Day care in the People's Republic of China". In Lamb, Michael E.; Sternberg, Kathleen J.; Hwang, Carl-Philip; Broberg, Anders G. (eds.). Child Care in Context: Cross-cultural Perspectives. Hillsdale, NJ: Lawrence Erlbaum. pp. 355–392. ISBN 978-1-317-76007-8. OCLC 867928566.
- Lee, Lee C.; Zane, Nolan (1998-07-21). Handbook of Asian American Psychology. SAGE Publications. ISBN 978-0-8039-4963-8.
