= Three-process view =

Psychological concept about insight

The three-process view is a psychological term coined by Janet E. Davidson and Robert Sternberg.

According to this concept, there are three kinds of insight: selective-encoding, selective-comparison, and selective-combination.

- Selective-encoding insight – Distinguishing what is important in a problem and what is irrelevant.
- Selective-comparison insight – Identifying information by finding a connection between acquired knowledge and experience.
- Selective-combination insight – Identifying a problem through understanding the different components and putting everything together.
