= Developmental Review =

- Discipline: Developmental psychology
- Language: English
- Edited by: Valérie Camos

Publication details
- History: 1981–present
- Publisher: Elsevier
- Frequency: Quarterly
- Impact factor: 8.306 (2020)

Standard abbreviations
- ISO 4: Dev. Rev.

Indexing
- CODEN: DEREES
- ISSN: 0273-2297
- LCCN: 82640873
- OCLC no.: 07033929

Links
- Journal homepage; Online access

Developmental Review is a quarterly peer-reviewed academic journal which publishes review articles in the field of developmental psychology. Presenting research that bears on important conceptual issues in developmental psychology, Developmental Review: Perspectives in Behavior and Cognition provides lifespan, aging, infancy, child, and adolescent behavioral scientists with authoritative articles that reflect current thinking and cover significant scientific developments, with a particular emphasis on human developmental processes. It was created in 1981 by Charles Brainerd and is published by Elsevier. The current editor-in-chief is Valérie Camos (University of Fribourg). According to the Journal Citation Reports, the journal has a 2020 impact factor of 8.308.
