= Robert Sternberg =

American psychologist (born 1949)

Robert J. Sternberg
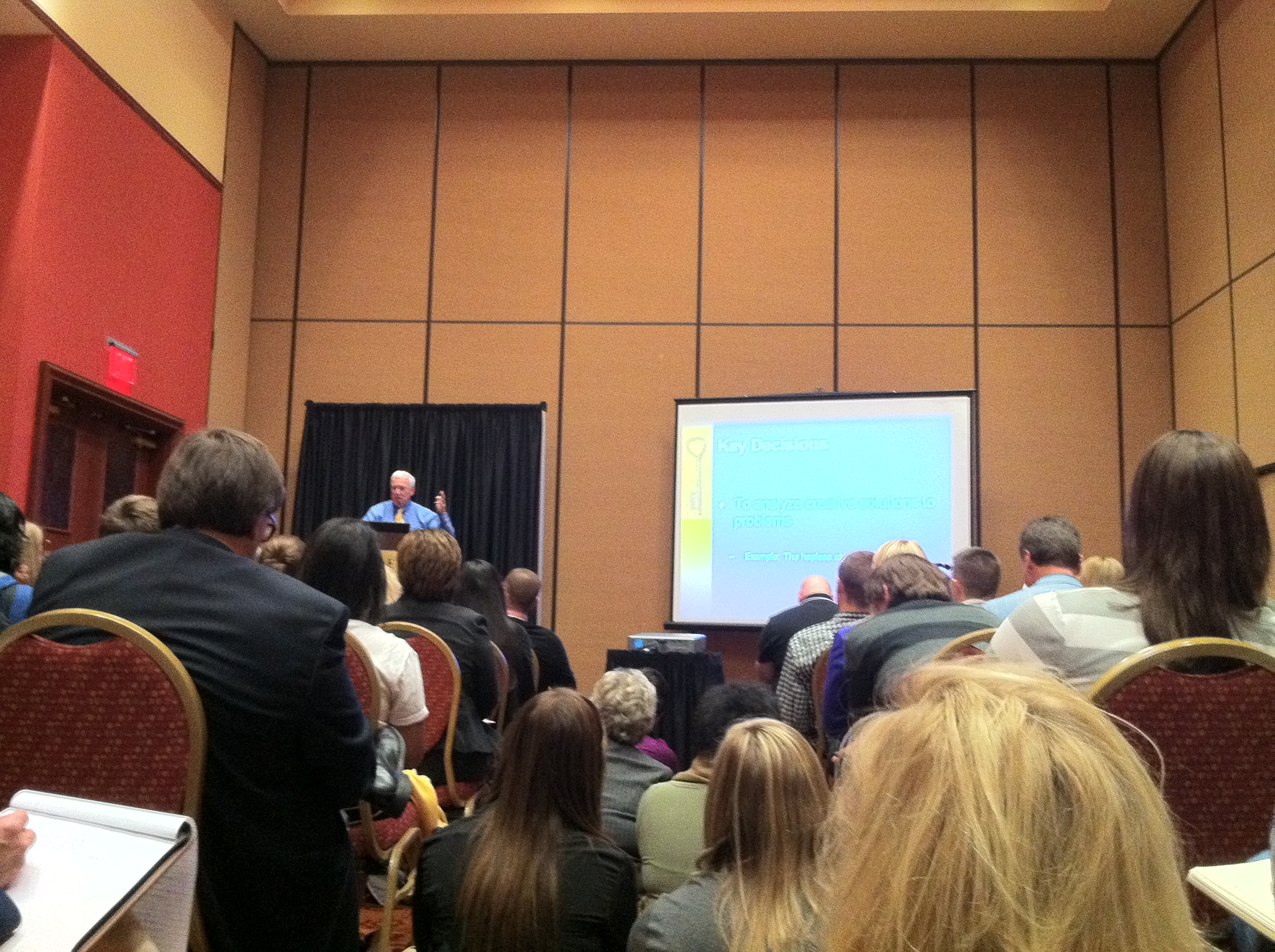
- Sternberg in 2011
- Born: December 8, 1949 (age 76); Newark, New Jersey, U.S.
- Education: Yale University (BA); Stanford University (PhD)
- Known for: Triarchic theory of intelligence Triangular theory of love Three-process view
- Awards: James McKeen Cattell Fellow Award (1999); E. L. Thorndike Award (2003)
- Scientific career
- Fields: Cognitive psychology
- Workplaces: Oklahoma State University, Yale University, Tufts University, University of Wyoming, Cornell University
- Doctoral advisor: Gordon Bower

Robert J. Sternberg (born December 8, 1949) is an American psychologist and psychometrician. He is a professor of Human Development at Cornell University. He is a distinguished associate of the Psychometrics Centre at the University of Cambridge.

Among his major contributions to psychology, the most notable are the triarchic theory of intelligence and several influential theories related to creativity, wisdom, thinking styles, love, hate, and leadership. A Review of General Psychology survey, published in 2002, ranked Sternberg as the 60th most cited psychologist of the 20th century.

== Early life ==
Sternberg was born on December 8, 1949, to a Jewish family, in New Jersey. Sternberg has written that he suffered from test anxiety as a child. As a result, he became an inadequate test taker. This upset him and he reasoned that a test was not an adequate measurement of his true knowledge and academic abilities. When he later retook a test in a room that consisted of younger students, he felt more comfortable and his scores increased dramatically. Sternberg later constructed the Sternberg Test of Mental Ability (STOMA), his first intelligence test.

== Career ==
Sternberg was an undergraduate student at Yale University. Neither of Sternberg's parents finished high school, and he attended Yale only by achieving a National Merit Scholarship and receiving financial aid. Sternberg received a B.A., summa cum laude, and was elected to Phi Beta Kappa, with distinction in psychology. Sternberg continued his academic career at Stanford University, where he earned his PhD, in 1975.

Sternberg returned to Yale as an assistant professor of Psychology in 1975, and would work at Yale for three decades, eventually becoming the IBM Professor of Psychology and Education, as well as the founder and director of the Center for the Psychology of Abilities, Competencies and Expertise.

He left Yale in 2005 to assume the position of Dean of the College of Arts and Sciences at Tufts University, where he quickly began his job search for a promotion to a Provost position. After multiple unsuccessful high-profile attempts to gain other academic leadership positions within a few years of arriving at Tufts, including at the University of Colorado and the University of Iowa, Sternberg was offered a position at Oklahoma State University in 2010, where he remained as provost for three years. In early 2013, Sternberg was named the new president of the University of Wyoming. After resigning from the University of Wyoming in late 2013, Sternberg joined the Human Development faculty of Cornell University.

=== University of Wyoming presidency ===
Sternberg took office in July 2013 as the University of Wyoming's 24th president. His major aim was to push the "development of ethical leadership in students, faculty and staff". Therefore, Sternberg wanted to change the University of Wyoming's test-based selection process of applicants towards an ethics-based admission process: "The set of analytical skills evaluated in the ACT [American College Testing] is only a small sliver of what you need to be an ethical leader."

After arriving at the University of Wyoming, Sternberg's term was marked by tumult in the faculty. Three weeks after taking in office as Wyoming's new president, the provost and vice president for academic affairs was asked to resign and stepped down. In the next four months, three associate provosts and four deans were asked to resign or resigned voluntarily—many explicitly citing disagreements with President Sternberg's approach.

The last dean to step down, the Dean of the College of Law, Stephen Easton, accused Sternberg at a university meeting of unethical treatment of staff, professors, and schools: "You have not treated this law school ethically." Sternberg refused to discuss the case at the meeting. The Casper Star Tribune portrayed the situation at the university as "chaos in the college". Additionally, other provosts blamed a lack of respect for and interest in human capital. According to Peter Shive, a professor emeritus, Sternberg asked everyone to wear the school colors, brown and gold, on Fridays. Shive said the farther away from the administrative building he went, the fewer people were wearing brown and gold.

Ray Hunkins, a UW Law College graduate, former counsel to the UW trustees, a member of the board of directors of the UW Foundation, and the Republican nominee for governor of Wyoming in 2006, questioned Sternberg's policies that had led to the dismissal or resignation of the administrators. "I think there's chaos in the university," Hunkins said.

On November 14, 2013, only 137 days after Sternberg had taken the helm of UW, it was announced at a press conference following a trustees meeting in William Robertson Coe Library that Sternberg had tendered his resignation to the board. In a public statement read by the trustee president, David Bostrom, Sternberg said that despite his care for the university, "It may not be the best fit for me as president." Laughter arose immediately upon the reading of Sternberg's statement. In accordance to university regulations, vice president for academic affairs Dr. Dick McGinity took the office as interim president. His resignation was neither asked for, nor forced by the Board of Trustees.

According to the Wyoming News, Sternberg's four-month presidency produced more than $1.25 million in administration-related costs equivalent to the costs of 31 faculty staff positions for one year. That includes $377,000 for Sternberg's severance pay, including $325,000 that he will be paid 2014; $37,500 in deferred compensation Sternberg is due by December 31; about $89,000 for the next presidential search; $330,000 for search firms to find replacements for administrators and deans who resigned; $265,000 for renovations to the house and garage that Sternberg was allowed to continue to rent at a price of $1,100 a month until May 31.

== Honorary degrees and professorships ==
Sternberg holds thirteen honorary doctorates, from universities in and outside the United States, including the Complutense University of Madrid, Durham University, KU Leuven, Tilburg University, University of Cyprus, University of Paris V, and St. Petersburg State University. Additionally, he holds an honorary professorship at the University of Heidelberg.

== Publication ethics ==
Sternberg began serving as editor of the journal Perspectives on Psychological Science in 2015. As editor he published eight commentaries in his own journal between 2016 and 2018 without peer review. In response to one of these pieces, a letter of concern was drafted, which over 100 psychologists endorsed. In addition to the concerns about the lack of peer review, the letter of concern also mentioned that these articles feature extreme levels of self-citation, ranging from 42% to 65%. In response to the letter and from pressure on social media, Sternberg resigned in late April 2018 from his position of editor of Perspectives on Psychological Science, over a year and a half before his term was scheduled to end. Several of his published papers were subsequently retracted for duplication.

== Awards and recognition ==
Sternberg's awards include the Cattell Award from the Association for Psychological Science (APS), Sir Francis Galton Award from the International Association of Empirical Aesthetics, the Arthur W. Staats Award from the American Psychological Foundation and the Society for General Psychology, the E. L. Thorndike Award for Career Achievement in Educational Psychology Award from the Society for Educational Psychology of the American Psychological Association (APA) and the Grawemeyer Award for Psychology in 2018. In the APA Monitor on Psychology, Sternberg has been rated as one of the top 100 psychologists of the twentieth century. The ISI has rated Sternberg as one of the most highly cited authors in psychology and psychiatry (top .5 percent). Sternberg is a fellow of the National Academy of Education, the American Academy of Arts and Sciences, the American Association for the Advancement of Science, and other organizations. He is past-president of the American Psychological Association and the Eastern Psychological Association, and currently is President of the Federation of Associations in the Behavioral and Brain Sciences.

== Research interests ==
Sternberg's main research include the following interests:

- Higher mental functions, including intelligence and creativity and wisdom
- Styles of thinking
- Cognitive modifiability
- Leadership
- Love, interpersonal relationships, and hate

Sternberg has proposed a triarchic theory of intelligence and a triangular theory of love. He is the creator (with Todd Lubart) of the investment theory of creativity, which states that creative people buy low and sell high in the world of ideas, and a propulsion theory of creative contributions, which states that creativity is a form of leadership.

He spearheaded an experimental admissions process at Tufts to quantify and test the creativity, practical skills, and wisdom-based skills of an applicant. He used similar techniques when he was provost at Oklahoma State.

Sternberg has criticized IQ tests, saying they are "convenient partial operationalizations of the construct of intelligence, and nothing more. They do not provide the kind of measurement of intelligence that tape measures provide of height."

In 1995, he was on an American Psychological Association task force writing a consensus statement on the state of intelligence research in response to the claims being advanced amid the Bell Curve controversy, titled "Intelligence: Knowns and Unknowns."

== Triarchic theory of intelligence ==
Many descriptions of intelligence focus on mental abilities such as vocabulary, comprehension, memory and problem-solving that can be measured through intelligence tests. This reflects the tendency of psychologists to develop their understanding of intelligence by observing behavior believed to be associated with intelligence.

Sternberg believes that this focus on specific types of measurable mental abilities is too narrow. He believes that studying intelligence in this way leads to an understanding of only one part of intelligence and that this part is only seen in people who are "school smart" or "book smart".

There are, for example, many individuals who score poorly on intelligence tests, but are creative or are "street smart" and therefore have a very good ability to adapt and shape their environment. According to Sternberg (2003), giftedness should be examined in a broader way incorporating other parts of intelligence.

=== The triarchic model ===
Sternberg (2003) categorizes intelligence into three parts, which are central in his theory:

- Analytical intelligence, the ability to complete academic, problem-solving tasks, such as those used in traditional intelligence tests. These types of tasks usually present well-defined problems that have only a single correct answer.
- Creative or synthetic intelligence, the ability to successfully deal with new and unusual situations by drawing on existing knowledge and skills. Individuals high in creative intelligence may give 'wrong' answers because they see things from a different perspective.
- Practical intelligence, the ability to adapt to everyday life by drawing on existing knowledge and skills. Practical intelligence enables an individual to understand what needs to be done in a specific setting and then do it.

Sternberg (2003) discusses experience and its role in intelligence. Creative or synthetic intelligence helps individuals to transfer information from one problem to another. Sternberg calls the application of ideas from one problem to a new type of problem relative novelty. In contrast to the skills of relative novelty there is relative familiarity which enables an individual to become so familiar with a process that it becomes automatized. This can free up brain resources for coping with new ideas.

Context, or how one adapts, selects and shapes their environment is another area that is not represented by traditional measures of giftedness. Practically intelligent people are good at picking up tacit information and utilizing that information. They tend to shape their environment around them. (Sternberg, 2003)

Sternberg (2003) developed a testing instrument to identify people who are gifted in ways that other tests don't identify. The Sternberg Triarchic Abilities Test measures not only traditional intelligence abilities but analytic, synthetic, automatization and practical abilities as well. There are four ways in which this test is different from conventional intelligence tests.

- This test is broader, measuring synthetic and practical skills in addition to analytic skills. The test provides scores on analytic, synthetic, automatization, and practical abilities, as well as verbal, quantitative, and figural processing abilities.
- The test measures the ability to understand unknown words in context rather than vocabulary skills which are dependent on an individual's background.
- The automatization subtest is the only part of the test that measures mental speed.
- The test is based on a theory of intelligence.

=== Practical application ===
Sternberg added experimental criteria to the application process for undergraduates to Tufts University, where he was Dean of Arts and Sciences, to test "creativity and other non-academic factors." Calling it the "first major university to try such a departure from the norm," Inside Higher Ed noted that Tufts continues to consider the SAT and other traditional criteria.

== Theory in cognitive styles ==
Sternberg proposed a theory of cognitive styles in 1988.

Sternberg's basic idea is that the forms of government we have in the world are external reflections of the way different people view and act in the world, that is, different ways of organizing and thinking. Cognitive styles should not be confused with abilities, they are the way we prefer to use these abilities. Indeed, a good fit between a person's preferred cognitive profile and his abilities can create a powerful synergy that outweighs the sum of its parts.

The main three branches of government are the executive branch, legislative branch and judicial branch. People also need to perform these functions in their own thinking and working. Legislative people like to build new structures, creating their own rules along the way. Executive people are rule followers, they like to be given a predetermined structure in which to work. Judicial people like to evaluate rules and procedures, to analyze a given structure.

The four forms of mental self-government are hierarchical, monarchic, oligarchic, and anarchic. The hierarchic style holds multiple goals simultaneously and prioritizes them. The oligarchic style is similar but differs in involving difficulty prioritizing. The monarchic style, in comparison, focuses on a single activity until completion. The anarchic style resists conformity to "systems, rules, or particular approaches to problems."

The two levels of mental self-government are local and global. The local style focuses on more specific and concrete problems, in extreme case they "can't see the forest for the trees". The global style, in comparison, focuses on more abstract and global problems, in extreme cases they "can't see the trees for the forest".

The two scopes of mental self-government are internal and external. The internal style focuses inwards and prefers to work independently. The external style focuses outwards and prefers to work in collaboration.

The two leanings of mental self-government are the liberal and conservative. These styles have nothing to do with politics. The liberal individual likes change, to go beyond existing rules and procedures. The conservative individual dislikes change and ambiguity, he will be happiest in a familiar and predictable environment.

All people have different profiles of thinking styles which can change over situations and time of life. Moreover, a person can, and often does, have a secondary preferred thinking style.

== Bibliography (selection) ==
=== On human intelligence ===
- Sternberg, R. J. (1977): Intelligence, information processing, and analogical reasoning: The componential analysis of human abilities.Hillsdale, NJ: Erlbaum.
- Sternberg, R. J. (1985): Beyond IQ: A triarchic theory of human intelligence. New York City: Cambridge University Press.
- Sternberg, R. J.; Detterman, Douglas K., eds. (1986). What is intelligence? Contemporary viewpoints on its nature and definition. Norwood (NJ): Ablex. ISBN 978-0-89391-373-1.
- Sternberg, R. J. (1990): Metaphors of mind: Conceptions of the nature of intelligence. New York: Cambridge University Press.
- Sternberg, R. J., ed. (1995). Encyclopedia of human intelligence. Macmillan. ISBN 978-0-02-897407-1. OCLC 29594474.
- Neisser, Ulrich G.; et al. (1996). "Intelligence: Knowns and unknowns" (PDF). American Psychologist. 51 (2): 77–101. doi:10.1037/0003-066x.51.2.77. ISSN 0003-066X. Archived from the original (PDF) on 16 October 2012.
- Sternberg, R. J. (1997): Successful intelligence. New York: Plume.
- Sternberg, R. J.; Grigorenko, E., eds. (1997). Intelligence, Heredity, and Environment. Cambridge: Cambridge University Press. ISBN 978-0-521-46489-5.
- Sternberg, R. J. (1999). "The theory of successful intelligence". Review of General Psychology. 3 (4): 292–316. doi:10.1037/1089-2680.3.4.292. S2CID 147144382.
- Sternberg, R. J. et al. (2000): Practical intelligence in everyday life. New York: Cambridge University Press.
- Sternberg, R. J., ed. (2000). Handbook of Intelligence. Cambridge: Cambridge University Press. ISBN 978-0-521-59648-0.
- Sternberg, R. J., & Grigorenko, E. L. (2000): Teaching for successful intelligence. Arlington Heights, IL: Skylight.
- Sternberg, R. J.; Grigorenko, E. L., eds. (2002). The General Factor of Intelligence: How General Is It?. Mahwah (NJ): Lawrence Erlbaum. ISBN 978-0-8058-3675-2.
- Sternberg, R. J.; Grigorenko, E., eds. (2003). The Psychology of Abilities, Competencies, and Expertise. Cambridge: Cambridge University Press. ISBN 978-0-521-80988-7.
- Cianciolo, A. T.; Sternberg, R. J. (2004). Intelligence: A Brief History. Blackwell Brief Histories of Psychology. Malden (MA): Blackwell. ISBN 978-1-4051-0824-9.
- Sternberg, R. J., ed. (2003). Why Smart People Can Be So Stupid. New Haven (CT): Yale University Press. ISBN 978-0-300-10170-6.
- Sternberg, R. J., ed. (2004). International Handbook of Intelligence. Cambridge: Cambridge University Press. ISBN 978-0-521-00402-2.
- Sternberg, R.J. (2007): Wisdom, Intelligence, and Creativity Synthesized. New York: Cambridge University Press.
- Sternberg, R. J.; Kaufman, J. C.; Grigorenko, E. (2008). Applied Intelligence. Cambridge: Cambridge University Press. ISBN 978-0-521-71121-0.
- Sternberg, R. J. (2010): "College admissions for the 21st century. Cambridge, MA: Harvard University Press.
- Preiss, D. D.; Sternberg, R. J., eds. (2010). Innovations in Educational Psychology: Perspectives on Learning, Teaching, and Human Development. New York: Springer Publishing. ISBN 978-0-8261-2162-2.
- Sternberg, R. J. (2012). "Chapter 6: The Triarchic Theory of Successful Intelligence". In Flanagan, D. P.; Harrison, P. L. (eds.). Contemporary Intellectual Assessment: Theories, tests, and issues (Third ed.). New York (NY): Guilford Press. pp. 156–177. ISBN 978-1-60918-995-2. ERIC ED530599.
- Sternberg, R. J., Landy, J., & Long, J. (2024). Measuring Adaptive Intelligence of the Gifted Through Critical Problem Analysis. Roeper Review, 46(3), 217–232. doi:10.1080/02783193.2024.2357543

=== On creativity and intellectual giftedness ===
- Sternberg, R. J., & Lubart, T. I. (1995): Defying the crowd: Cultivating creativity in a culture of conformity. New York: Free Press.
- Sternberg, R. J., & Williams, W. M. (1996): How to develop student creativity. Alexandria, VA: Association for Supervision and Curriculum Development.
- Sternberg, R. J., James C Kaufman, & Pretz, J. E. (2002): The creativity conundrum: A propulsion model of creative contributions. Philadelphia, PA.
- Ambrose, D.; Sternberg, R. J.; Sriraman, B., eds. (2003). Confronting Dogmatism in Gifted Education. New York: Routledge. ISBN 978-0-415-89446-3.
- Sternberg, R. J.; Davidson, J. E., eds. (2005). Conceptions of Giftedness. Cambridge: Cambridge University Press. ISBN 978-0-521-54730-7.
- Sternberg, R. J.; Jarvin, L.; Grigorenko, E. L. (2010). Explorations in Giftedness. Cambridge: Cambridge University Press. ISBN 978-0-521-74009-8.

=== On leadership ===
- Sternberg, R. J.; Vroom, V. H. (2002). "The person versus the situation in leadership". Leadership Quarterly. 13 (3): 301–323. doi:10.1016/s1048-9843(02)00101-7.

=== On cognitive styles ===
- Sternberg, R. J.; Grigorenko, E. (1997). "Are cognitive styles still in style?". American Psychologist. 52 (7): 700–712. doi:10.1037/0003-066x.52.7.700.
- Sternberg, R. J. (1988). "Mental self-government: A theory of intellectual styles and their development". Human Development. 31 (4): 197–224. doi:10.1159/000275810.

=== Other works, including edited volumes ===
- Heller, K. A.; Mönks, F. J.; Sternberg, R. J.; Subotnik, Rena F., eds. (2000). International Handbook of Giftedness and Talent (2nd ed.). Amsterdam: Pergamon. ISBN 978-0-08-043796-5.
- Sternberg, Robert J. (2008). Kaufman, James C.; Grigorenko, Elena L. (eds.). The Essential Sternberg: Essays on Intelligence, Psychology, and Education. Springer Publishing Company. ISBN 978-0-8261-3837-8.
  - Trevor R. Parmenter (September 2011). "The Essential Sternberg. Essays on Intelligence, Psychology, and Education". Journal of Policy and Practice in Intellectual Disabilities. 8 (3): 218–219. doi:10.1111/j.1741-1130.2011.00312.x..
- Fiske, Susan T.; Schacter, Daniel L.; Sternberg, Robert J. (2010). Annual review of psychology. Vol. 61. Palo Alto, Calif: Annual Reviews. ISBN 978-0-8243-0261-0.
- Sternberg, R. J.; Kaufman, S. B., eds. (2011). The Cambridge Handbook of Intelligence. Cambridge: Cambridge University Press. ISBN 978-0-521-73911-5.
- Sternberg, R. J. (2014). "I study what I stink at: Lessons learned from a career in psychology". Annual Review of Psychology. 65: 1–16. doi:10.1146/annurev-psych-052913-074851. PMID 24050185. S2CID 42645774.
- Sternberg, Robert J.; Fiske, Susan T.; Foss, Donald J., eds. (2016). Scientists Making a Difference: One Hundred Eminent Behavioral and Brain Scientists Talk about Their Most Important Contributions. Cambridge University Press. ISBN 978-1-107-12713-5.
