= Research on Child and Adolescent Psychopathology =

- Discipline: Psychology, Developmental psychology
- Language: English
- Edited by: Joshua M. Langberg

Publication details
- Former name: Journal of Abnormal Child Psychology
- History: 1973–present
- Publisher: Springer (International)
- Frequency: 8/year
- Open access: Hybrid
- Impact factor: 3.406 (2018)

Standard abbreviations
- ISO 4: Res. Child Adolesc. Psychopathol.

Indexing
- ISSN: 0091-0627 (print); 1573-2835 (web)

Links
- Journal homepage

Research on Child and Adolescent Psychopathology (formerly Journal of Abnormal Child Psychology) is the official publication of the International Society for Research in Child and Adolescent Psychopathology (ISRCAP). This scientific journal publishes eight issues per year focusing on research in psychopathology in childhood and adolescence.

Current Editor: Joshua Langberg, Rutgers University, New Brunswick, New Jersey

Founding Editor: Herbert C. Quay, University of Miami, Coral Gables, Florida
