= Society for Research in Child Development =

The Society for Research in Child Development (SRCD) is a professional society for the field of human development, focusing specifically on child development. It is a multidisciplinary, not-for-profit, professional association with a membership of approximately 5,500 researchers, practitioners, and human development professionals from over 50 countries. The purposes of the society are to promote multidisciplinary research in the field of human development, to foster the exchange of information among scientists and other professionals of various disciplines, and to encourage applications of research findings.

== History ==
The field of child development received formal recognition in 1922-23 through the appointment of a subcommittee on Child Development of the National Research Council. In 1925, under the direction of Robert S. Woodworth, an eminent experimental psychologist, this group became the Committee in Child Development with offices and staff in the National Academy of Sciences. The purpose of the committee was to integrate research activities and to stimulate research in child development. The committee awarded fellowships, initiated conferences, and began publications. In 1927, 425 scientists were listed in the Directory of Research in Child Development, and that same year the first volume of Child Development Abstracts and Bibliography (CDAB) was published. In 1933, the Committee on Child Development disbanded and passed the torch to the newly organized Society for Research in Child Development (SRCD). A collection of the organization's records is held at the National Library of Medicine in Bethesda, Maryland.

== Activities ==
=== International activities ===
Nearly 20% of SRCD's members are from nations outside the United States, representing over 50 countries around the world. Special efforts are made by the society, through its Committee on International Relations, to increase interaction and communication between members of the society and all researchers in human development throughout the world.

=== Ethics ===
Of great importance to the society is the establishment and maintenance of ethical standards for research with children. The Committee on Ethical Conduct in Child Development Research promulgates such standards.

=== Diversity ===
The society fosters a commitment to research and training in diversity. The Committees on Ethnic and Racial Issues have made progress in improving, increasing, and disseminating research to members.

=== Social policy ===
Under the guidance of the Policy and Communications Committee, the Society helps to bring the results of research to bear on the formulation of policy affecting children and families. One way in which this is done is through the Policy Fellowship Program in Child Development. Begun in 1978, this program is part of a larger fellowship program administered by the American Association for the Advancement of Science. The goals of this program are to contribute to the effective use of scientific knowledge, to educate the scientific community about the development of public policy, and to establish a more effective liaison between scientists and federal offices. Fellows spend a year as aides or associates in various offices in federal agencies, working with staff in the translation of research to applied issues.

== Conference ==
In the spring of odd numbered years, the society sponsors a biennial SRCD Conference, a meeting in which members can present individual research reports, symposia, invited lectures, and discussion sessions, among other timely and historical programs. Attendance typically exceeds 5,000 and includes faculty, students, and other individuals who conduct research on child development.

At the conference, several biennial awards are presented:

- SRCD Senior Distinguished Contributions Awards,
- SRCD Early Career Research Contributions Awards,
- SRCD Outstanding Doctoral Dissertation Awards.

== Journals ==
- Child Development
- Child Development Perspectives
- Monographs of the Society for Research in Child Development
