= Fuzzy-trace theory =

Theory of cognition

Fuzzy-trace theory (FTT) is a theory of cognition originally proposed by Valerie F. Reyna and Charles Brainerd to explain cognitive phenomena, particularly in memory and reasoning.

FTT posits two types of memory processes (verbatim and gist) and, therefore, it is often referred to as a dual process theory of memory. According to FTT, retrieval of verbatim traces (recollective retrieval) is characterized by mental reinstatement of the contextual features of a past event, whereas retrieval of gist traces (nonrecollective retrieval) is not. In fact, gist processes form representations of an event's semantic features rather than its surface details, the latter being a property of verbatim processes.

The theory has been used in areas such as cognitive psychology, human development, and social psychology to explain, for instance, false memory and its development, probability judgments, medical decision making, risk perception and estimation, and biases and fallacies in decision making.

FTT can explain phenomena involving both true memories (i.e., memories about events that actually happened) as well as false memories (i.e., memories about events that never happened).

== History ==
FTT was initially proposed in the 1990s as an attempt to unify findings from the memory and reasoning domains that could not be predicted or explained by earlier approaches to cognition and its development (e.g., constructivism and information processing). One of such challenges was the statistical independence between memory and reasoning, that is, memory for background facts of problem situations is often unrelated to accuracy in reasoning tasks. Such findings called for a rethinking of the memory-reasoning relation, which in FTT took the form of a dual-process theory linking basic concepts from psycholinguistic and Gestalt theory to memory and reasoning. More specifically, FTT posits that people form two types of mental representations about a past event, called verbatim and gist traces. Gist traces are fuzzy representations of a past event (e.g., its bottom-line meaning), hence the name fuzzy-trace theory, whereas verbatim traces are detailed representations of a past event. Although people are capable of processing both verbatim and gist information, they prefer to reason with gist traces rather than verbatim. This implies, for example, that even if people are capable of understanding ratio concepts like probabilities and prevalence rates, which are the standard for the presentation of health- and risk-related data, their choice in decision situations will usually be governed by the bottom-line meaning of it (e.g., "the risk is high" or "the risk is low"; "the outcome is bad" or "the outcome is good") rather than the actual numbers. More importantly, in FTT, memory-reasoning independence can be explained in terms of preferred modes of processing when one performs a memory task (e.g., retrieval of verbatim traces) relative to when one performs a reasoning task (e.g., preference for reasoning with gist traces).

In 1999, a similar approach was applied to human vision. It suggested that human vision has two types of processing: one that aggregates local spatial receptive fields, and one that parses the local receptive field. People used prior experience, gists, to decide which process dominates a perceptual decision. The work attempted to link Gestalt theory and psychophysics (i.e., independent linear filters). This theory was further developed into fuzzy image processing and used in information processing technology and edge detection.

== Memory ==
In the memory domain, FTT's notion of verbatim and gist representations has been influential in explaining true memories (i.e., memories about events that actually happened) as well as false memories (i.e., memories about events that never happened). The following five principles have been used to predict and explain true and false memory phenomena:

=== Principles ===
==== Process independence ====
===== Parallel storage =====
The principle of parallel storage asserts that the encoding and storage of verbatim and gist information operate in parallel rather than in a serial fashion. For instance, suppose that a person is presented with the word "apple" in red color. On the one hand, according to the principle of parallel storage of verbatim and gist traces, verbatim features of the target item (e.g., the word was apple, it was presented in red, printed in boldface and italic, and all but the first letter were presented in lowercase) and gist features (e.g., the word was a type of fruit) would be encoded and stored simultaneously via distinct pathways. Conversely, if verbatim and gist traces are stored in a serial fashion, then gist features of the target item (the word was a type of fruit) would be derived from its verbatim features and, therefore, the formation of gist traces would depend on the encoding and storage of verbatim traces. The latter idea was often assumed by early memory models. However, despite the intuitive appeal of the serial processing approach, research suggests that the encoding and storage of gist traces do not depend on verbatim ones. Several studies have converged on the finding that the meaning of target items is encoded independently of, and even prior to, the encoding of the surface form of the same items. Ankrum and Palmer, for example, found that when participants are presented with a familiar word (e.g., apple) for a very brief period (100 milliseconds), they are able to identify the word itself ("was it apple?") better than its letters ("did it contain the letter L?").

===== Dissociated retrieval =====
Similar to the principle of parallel storage, retrieval of verbatim and gist traces also occur via dissociated pathways. According to the principle of dissociated retrieval, recollective and nonrecollective retrieval processes are independent of each other. Consequently, this principle allows verbatim and gist processes to be differentially influenced by factors such as the type of retrieval cues and the availability of each form of representation. In connection with Tulving's encoding specificity principle, items that were actually presented in the past are better cues for verbatim traces than items that were not. Similarly, items that were not presented in the past but preserve the meaning of presented items are usually better cues for gist traces. Suppose, for example, that subjects of an experiment are presented with a word list containing several dog breeds, such as poodle, bulldog, greyhound, doberman, beagle, collie, boxer, mastiff, husky, and terrier. During a recognition test, the words poodle, spaniel, and chair are presented. According to the principle of dissociated retrieval, retrieval of verbatim and gist traces does not depend on each other and, therefore, different types of test probes might serve as better cues to one type of trace than another. In this example, test probes such as poodle (targets, or studied items) will be better retrieval cues for verbatim traces than gist, whereas test probes such as spaniel (related distractors, non-studied items but related to targets) will be better retrieval cues for gist traces than verbatim. Chair, on the other hand, would neither be a better cue for verbatim traces nor for gist traces because it was not presented and is not related to dogs. If verbatim and gist processes were dependent, then factors that affect one process would also affect the other in the same direction. However, several experiments showing, for example, differential forgetting rates between memory for the surface details and memory for the bottom-line meaning of past events favor the notion of dissociated retrieval of verbatim and gist traces. In the case of forgetting rates, those experiments have shown that, over time, verbatim traces become inaccessible at a faster rate than gist traces. Brainerd, Reyna, and Kneer, for instance, found that delay drives true recognition rates (supported by both verbatim and gist traces) and false recognition rates (supported by gist and suppressed by verbatim traces) in opposite directions, namely true memory decays over time while false memory increases.

==== Opponent processes in false memory ====
The principle of opponent processes describes the interaction between verbatim and gist processes in creating true and false memories. Whereas true memory is supported by both verbatim and gist processes, false memory is supported by gist processes and suppressed by verbatim processes. In other words, verbatim and gist processes work in opposition to one another when it comes to false memories. Suppose, for example, that one is presented with a word list such as lemon, apple, pear, and citrus. During a recognition test, the items lemon (target), orange (related distractor), and fan (unrelated distractor) are shown. In this case, retrieval of a gist trace (fruits) supports acceptance of both test probes lemon (true memory) and orange (false memory), whereas retrieval of a verbatim trace (lemon) only supports acceptance of the test probe lemon. In addition, retrieval of an exclusory verbatim trace ("I saw only the words lemon, apple, pear, and citrus") suppresses acceptance of false but related items such as orange through an operation known as recollection rejection. If neither verbatim nor gist traces are retrieved, then one might accept any test probe on the basis of response bias.
This principle plays a key role in FTT's explanation of experimental dissociations between true and false memories (e.g., when a variable affects one type of memory without affecting the other, or when it produces opposite effects on them). The time of exposure of each word during study and the number of repetitions have been shown to produce such dissociations. More specifically, while true memory follows a monotonically increasing function when plotted against presentation duration, false memory rates exhibit an inverted-U pattern when plotted as a function of presentation duration. Similarly, repetition is monotonically related to true memory (true memory increases as a function of the number of repetitions) and is non-monotonically related to false memory (repetition produces an inverted-U relation with false memory).

==== Retrieval phenomenology ====
Retrieval phenomenologies are spontaneous mental experiences associated with the act of remembering. It was first systematically characterized by E. K. Strong in the early 1900s. Strong identified two distinct types of introspective phenomena associated with memory retrieval that have since been termed recollection (or remembrance) and familiarity. Whereas the former is characterized as retrieval associated with recollection of past experiences, the latter lacks such association. The two forms of experiences can be illustrated by everyday expressions such as "I remember that!" (recollection) and "That seems familiar..." (familiarity). In FTT, retrieval of verbatim traces often produces recollective phenomenology and thus is frequently referred to as recollective retrieval. However, one feature of FTT is that recollective phenomenology is not particular to one type of memory process as posited by other dual-process theories of memory. Instead, FTT posits that retrieval of gist traces can also produce recollective phenomenology under some circumstances. When gist resemblance between a false item and memory is high and compelling, this gives rise to a phenomenon called phantom recollection, which is a vivid, but false, memory deemed to be true.

==== Developmental variability in dual processes ====
The principle of developmental variability in dual processes posits that verbatim and gist processes show variability across the lifespan. More specifically, verbatim and gist processes have been shown to improve between early childhood and young adulthood. Regarding verbatim processes, older children are better at retrieval of verbatim traces than younger children, although even very young children (4-year-olds) are able to retrieve verbatim information at above chance level. For instance, source memory accuracy greatly increases between 4-year-olds and 6-year-olds, and memory for nonsense words (i.e., words without a meaning) has been shown to increase between 7- and 10-year-olds. Gist processes also improve with age. For example, semantic clustering in free recall increases from 8-year-olds to 14-year-olds, and meaning connection across words and sentences has been shown to improve between 6- and 9-year-olds. In particular, the notion that gist memory improves with age plays a central role in FTT's prediction of age increases in false memory, a counterintuitive pattern that has been called developmental reversal.

Regarding old age, several studies suggest that verbatim memory declines between early and late adulthood, while gist memory remains fairly stable. Experiments indicate that older adults perform worse on tasks that require retrieval of surface features from studied items relative to younger adults. In addition, results with measurement models that quantify verbatim and gist processes indicate that older adults are less able to use verbatim traces during recall than younger adults.

=== False memories ===
When people try to remember past events (e.g., a birthday party or the last dinner), they often commit two types of errors: errors of omission and errors of commission. The former is known as forgetting, while the latter is better known as false memories. False memories can be separated into spontaneous and implanted false memories. Spontaneous false memories result from endogenous (internal) processes, such as meaning processing, while implanted false memories are the result of exogenous (external) processes, such as the suggestion of false information by an outside source (e.g., an interviewer asking misleading questions). Research had first suggested that younger children are more susceptible to suggestion of false information than adults. However, research has since indicated that younger children are much less likely to form false memories than older children and adults. Moreover, in opposition to common sense, true memories are not more stable than false ones. Studies have shown that false memories are actually more persistent than true memories. According to FTT, such pattern arises because false memories are supported by memory traces that are less susceptible to interference and forgetting (gist traces) than traces that suppress them and also support true memories (verbatim traces).

FTT is not a model for false memories but rather a model that explains how memory reacts with a higher reasoning process. Essentially, the gist and verbatim traces of whatever the subject is experiencing has a major effect on information that the subject falsely remembers. Verbatim and gist traces assist with memory performance due to the performance being able to pull from traces, relying on factors of different retrieval cues, on the accessibility of these kinds of memories, and forgetting. Although not a model for false memories, FTT is able to predict true and false memories associated with narratives and sentences. This is especially apparent in eye witness testimonies.

There are 5 explanatory principles that explain FTT's description of false memory, which lays out the differences between experiences dealing with gist and verbatim traces.

- The storage of verbatim and gist traces are lateral. The subject and the meaning contents are lateral in experiences. The very surface forms of directly experienced events are representations of verbatim traces; gist traces are stored throughout many levels of familiarity.
- The retrieval of gist and verbatim traces: Retrieval cues work best with verbatim when the subject experiences different events. Events that are not explicitly experienced work best with regard to retrieval cues in gist traces. Surface memories in verbatim traces typically will decline more rapidly than those memories which deal with meaning.
- False Memory and the dual-opponent processes: Effects on false memory typically differ between retrieval cues of verbatim and gist traces. Gist traces will support false memory because the meaning an item has to the subject will seem like it is familiar; whereas verbatim processes will suppress the false memory by getting rid of the familiarity of the meaning to the subject. However, when a false memory is shown to the subject as a suggestion, this rule takes exception. In this case, both retrieval cues of gist and verbatim traces will support the false memory, while the verbatim trace, through retrieval of originally experienced memories, will suppress the false memory.
- Variability in development: There is some variability to the development of retrieval of both gist and verbatim memory; both of these will improve during development into adulthood. Especially in the case of gist traces, where as someone gets older, connecting meaning with different items/events will improve.
- Gist and verbatim processes assist with remembering an event vividly. The retrieval of both gist and verbatim support a form of verbatim assist with remembering, either the recollected thoughts will be more generic like in the case of gist traces or conscience experiences like with verbatim traces.

Differences between true and false memories are also laid out by FTT. The associations and dissociations between true and false memories are predicted by FTT, namely, certain associations and dissociations are observed under different kinds of conditions. Dissociation emerges under situations that involve reliance on verbatim traces. Memories, whether true or false are then based on different kinds of representations.

FTT may also help explain the effects of false memories, misinformation, and false-recognition in children as well as how this may vary during developmental changes.

While many false memories may be perceived as being "dumb," recent studies on FTT have shown that the theory might have an influence on creating "smart" false memories, which are created from being aware of the meaning of certain experiences.

While false memory research is still in early development, the application of FTT in false memory has been able to apply to real world settings; FTT has been effective in explaining multiple phenomena of false memory. In explaining false memories, FTT rejects the idea that offhand false memories are deemed as being true and how gist and verbatim traces embed false memories.

== Reasoning and decision-making ==
FTT, as it applies to reasoning, is adapted from dual process models of human cognition. It differs from the traditional dual process model in that it makes a distinction between impulsivity and intuition—which are combined in System 1 according to traditional dual process theories—and then makes the claim that expertise and advanced cognition relies on intuition. The distinction between intuition and analysis depends on what kind of representation is used to process information. The mental representations described by FTT are categorized as either gist or verbatim representations:

- Gist representations are bottom-line understandings of the meaning of information or experience, and are used in intuitive gist processing.
- Verbatim representations are the precise and detailed representations of the exact information or experience, and are used in analytic verbatim processing.

Generally, most adults display what is called a "fuzzy processing preference," meaning that they rely on the least precise gist representations necessary to make a decision, despite parallel processing of both gist and verbatim representations. Both processes increase with age, though the verbatim process develops sooner than the gist, and is thus more heavily relied on in adolescence.

In this regard, the theory expands on research that has illustrated the role of memory representations in reasoning processes, the intersection of which has been previously underexplored. However, in certain circumstances, FTT predicts independence between memory and reasoning, specifically between reasoning tasks that rely on gist representations and memory tests that rely on verbatim representations. An example of this is research between the risky choice framing task and working memory, in which better working memory is not associated with a reduction in bias.

FTT thus explains inconsistencies or biases in reasoning to be dependent on retrieval cues that access stored values and principles that are gist representations, which can be filtered through experience and cultural, affective, and developmental factors. This dependence on gist results in a vulnerability of reasoning to processing interference from overlapping classes of events, but can also explain expert reasoning in that a person can treat superficially different reasoning problems in the same way if the problems share an underlying gist.

=== Risk perception and probability judgments ===
FTT posits that when people are presented with statistical information, they extract representations of the gist of the information (qualitatively) as well as the exact verbatim information (quantitatively). The gist that is encoded is often a basic categorical distinction between no risk and some risk. However, in situations when both choices in the decision have a level of uncertainty or risk, then another level of precision would be required, e.g., low risk or high risk. An illustration of this principle can be found in FTT's explanation of the common framing effect.

==== Framing effects ====
Framing effects occur when linguistically different descriptions of equivalent options lead to inconsistent choices. A famous example of a risky choice framing task is the Asian Disease Problem. This task requires the participants to imagine that their country is about to face a disease which is expected to kill 600 people. They have to choose among two programs to combat this disease. Subjects are presented with options that are framed as either gains (lives saved) or losses (lives lost). The possible options, as well as the categorical gists that are posited to be encoded by FTT are displayed below.

	Gain frame	Loss frame
Sure option	"If program A is adopted, 200 people will be saved."	"If program C is adopted, 400 people will die."
Risky option	"If program B is adopted, there is 1/3 probability that 600 people will be saved, and 2/3 probability that no people will be saved."	"If program D is adopted, there is 1/3 probability that nobody will die, and 2/3 probability that 600 people will die."
Encoded gist of sure option	Some people will be saved	Some people will die
Encoded gist of risky option	Some people will be saved or no one will be saved	Some people will die or no one will die

It is commonly found that people prefer the sure option when the options are framed as gains (program A) and the risky option when they are framed as losses (program D), despite the fact that the expected values for all the programs are equivalent. This is in contrast to a normative point of view that would indicate that if respondents prefer the sure option in the positive frame, they should also prefer the sure option in the negative frame.

The explanation for this effect according to FTT is that people will tend to operate on the simplest gist that is permitted to make a decision. In the case of this framing question, the gain frame presents a situation in which people prefer the gist of some people being saved to the possibility that some are saved or no one could be saved, and conversely, that the possibility of some people dying or no one dying is preferable to the option that some people will surely die.

Critical tests have been conducted to provide evidence in support of this explanation in favor of other theoretical explanations (i.e., Prospect theory) by presenting a modified version of this task that eliminates some mathematically redundant wording, e.g., program B would instead indicate that "If program B is adopted, there is 1/3 probability that 600 people will be saved." FTT predicts, in this case, that the elimination of the additional gist (the explicit possible death in program B) would result in indifference and eliminate the framing effect, which is indeed what was found.

==== Probability judgments and risk ====
The dual-process assumption of FTT has also been used to explain common biases of probability judgment, including the conjunction and disjunction fallacies. The conjunction fallacy occurs when people mistakenly judge a specific set of circumstances to be more probable than a more general set that includes the specific set. This fallacy is famously demonstrated by the Linda problem: that given a description of a woman named Linda who is an outspoken philosophy major who is concerned about discrimination and social justice, people will judge "Linda is a bank teller and is active in the feminist movement" to be more probable than "Linda is a bank teller", despite the fact that the latter statement is entirely inclusive of the former. FTT explains this phenomenon to not be a matter of encoding, given that priming participants to understand the inclusive nature of the categories tends not to reduce the bias. Instead, this is the result of the salience of relational gist, which contributes to a tendency to judge relative numerosity instead of merely applying the principle of class inclusion.

Errors of probability perception are also associated with the theory's predictions of contradictory relationships between risk perception and risky behavior. Specifically, that endorsement of accurate principles of objective risk is actually associated with greater risk-taking, whereas measures that assess global, gist-based judgments of risk had a protective effect (consistent with other predictions from FTT in the field of medical decision making). Since gist processing develops after verbatim processing as people age, this finding lends explanation to the increase in risk-taking that occurs during adolescence.

=== Management and economics ===
FTT has also been applied in the domains of consumer behavior and economics. For example, since the theory posits that people rely primarily on gist representations in making decisions, and that culture and experience can affect consumers' gist representations, factors such as cultural similarity and personal relevance have been used to explain consumers' perceptions of the risk of food-borne contamination and their intentions to reduce consumption of certain foods. In other words, one's evaluation of how "at-risk" he or she is can be influenced both by specific information learned as well as by the fuzzy representations of culture experience, and perceived proximity. In practice this resulted in greater consumer concern when the threat of a food-borne-illness was described in a culturally similar location, regardless of geographical proximity or other verbatim details.

Evidence was also found in consumer research in support of FTT's "editing" hypothesis, namely that extremely low-probability risks can be simplified by gist processing to be represented as "essentially nil." For example, one study found that people were willing to pay more for a safer product if safety was expressed relatively (i.e., product A is safer than product B) than they were if safety was expressed with statistics of actual incidence of safety hazards. This result is in contrast to most prescriptive decision rules that predict that formally equivalent methods of communicating risk information should have identical effects on risk-taking behavior, even if the pertinent displays are different. These findings are predicted by FTT (and related models), which suggest that people reason on the basis of simplified representations rather than on the literal information available.

=== Medical decision-making ===
Like other people, clinicians apply cognitive heuristics and fall into systematic errors which affect decisions in everyday life. Research has shown that patients and their physicians have difficulty understanding a host of numerical concepts, especially risks and probabilities, and this often implies some problems with numeracy, or mathematical proficiency. For example, physicians and patients both demonstrate great difficulty understanding the probabilities of certain genetic risks and were prone to the same errors, despite vast differences in medical knowledge. Though traditional dual process theory generally predicts that decisions made by computation are superior to those made by intuition, FTT assumes the opposite: that intuitive processing is more sophisticated and is capable of making better decisions, and that increases in expertise are accompanied by reliance on intuitive, gist-based reasoning rather than on literal, verbatim reasoning. FTT predicts that simply educating people with statistics regarding risk factors can hinder prevention efforts. Due to low prevalence of HIV or cancer, for example, people tend to overestimate their risks, and consequently interventions stressing the actual numbers may move people toward complacency as opposed to risk reduction. When women learn that their actual risks for breast cancer are lower than they thought, they return for screening at a lower rate. Also, some interventions to discourage adolescent drug use by presenting the risks have been shown to be ineffective or can even backfire.

The conclusion drawn from this evidence is that health-care professionals and health policymakers need to package, present, and explain information in more meaningful ways that facilitate forming an appropriate gist. Such strategies would include explaining quantities qualitatively, displaying information visually, and tailoring the format to trigger the appropriate gist and to cue the retrieval of health-related knowledge and values. Web-based interventions have been designed using these principles, which have been found to increase the patient's willingness to escalate care, as well as gain knowledge and make an informed choice.

== Implications ==
Theory-driven research using principles from FTT provides empirically supported recommendations that can be applied in many fields. For example, it provides specific recommendations regarding interventions aiming at reducing adolescent risk taking. Moreover, according to FTT, precise information does not necessarily work to communicate health-related information, which has obvious implications to public policy and procedures for improving treatment adherence in particular. Specifically, FTT principles suggest examples of how to display risk proportions in order to be comprehensible for both patients and health care professionals:

- Explain quantities qualitatively. Do not rely solely on numbers when presenting information.
- Explain quantities, percentages, and probabilities verbally, stressing conceptual understanding (the bottom-line meaning of information) over precise memorization of verbatim facts or numbers (e.g., a 20% chance of breast cancer is actually a "high" risk).
- Provide verbal guidance in disentangling classes and class-inclusion relationships.
- Display information visually. When it is necessary to present information numerically, arrange numbers so that meaningful patterns or relationships among them are obvious.
- Make use of graphical displays which help people extract the relevant gist. Useful formats for conveying relative risks and other comparative information include simple bar graphs and risk ladders. Pie charts are good for representing relative proportions. Line graphs are optimal for conveying the gist of a linear trend, such as survival and mortality curves or the effectiveness of a drug over time. Stacked bar graphs are useful for showing absolute risks; and Venn diagrams, two-by-two grids, and 100-square grids are useful for disentangling numerators and denominators and for eliminating errors from probability judgments.
- Avoid distracting gists. The class-inclusion confusion is especially likely to produce errors when visually or emotionally salient details, a story, or a stereotype draws attention away from the relevant data in the direction of extraneous information. For example, given a display of seven cows and three horses, children are asked whether there are more cows or more animals. Until the age of ten, children often respond that there are more cows than animals, even after counting the number in each class aloud correctly. However, young children in the previous example are more likely to answer the problem correctly when they are not shown a picture with the visually hard-to-ignore detail, that is, several figures of cows.
- Facilitate reexamination of problems. Encourage people to reexamine problems and edit their initial judgments. Although gist for quantities tends to be more available than the numbers verbatim, people can and do attend to the numbers to correct their first gist-based impressions when cued to do so and when they are given the time and opportunity, which can help reducing errors.

In addition, memory principles in FTT provide recommendations to eyewitness testimony. Children are often called upon to testify in courts, most commonly in cases of maltreatment, divorce, and child custody. Contrary to common sense, FTT posits that children can be reliable witnesses as long as they are encouraged to report verbatim memories and their reports are protected from suggestion of false information. More specifically:

- Children should be interviewed as soon as possible after the target event to reduce exposure to false suggestions and to facilitate retrieval of verbatim memories before their rapid decay.
- When reminding a witness of a target event, interviewers should present pictures or photos rather than words to describe it. Pictures of the actual target event help to increase retrieval of true memories as they are better cues to verbatim memories than words.
- Avoid repeated questioning. FTT predicts, for example, that the repetition of questions that restate the gist of a false information can increase the probability of false memories during subsequent interviews.
- Do not give children negative feedback about their performance during an interview. This procedure prompts children to provide additional information that is often false rather than true.

== See also ==
- Behavioral economics
- Cognitive development
- Decision-making
- Developmental psychology
- Framing
- Reason
- Risk
