= Brain and Cognition =

- Discipline: Cognitive neuroscience, Psychophysiology
- Language: English

Publication details
- History: 1982–present
- Publisher: Elsevier (United States)
- Frequency: 9/year
- Impact factor: 2.432 (2016)

Standard abbreviations
- ISO 4: Brain Cogn.

Indexing
- ISSN: 0278-2626 (print); 1090-2147 (web)
- LCCN: 83640073
- OCLC no.: 973870542

Links
- Journal homepage; Online access

Brain and Cognition is an American scientific journal founded in 1982. It covers the fields of cognitive neuroscience and psychophysiology.

According to the Journal Citation Reports, the journal has a 2016 impact factor of 2.432, ranking it 160th out of 253 journals in the category "Neurosciences", and 31st out of 84 journals in the category "Psychology, experimental".
