= Cognition and Emotion =

- Discipline: Cognitive psychology
- Language: English
- Edited by: Sander L. Koole; Klaus Rothermund

Publication details
- History: 1987–present
- Publisher: Routledge
- Frequency: 8/year
- Impact factor: 2.563 (2017)

Standard abbreviations
- ISO 4: Cogn. Emot.

Indexing
- ISSN: 0269-9931 (print); 1464-0600 (web)
- LCCN: 00238845
- OCLC no.: 1039330776

Links
- Journal homepage; Online access; Online archive

Cognition and Emotion is a peer-reviewed scientific journal with a specific focus on the interplay between thinking and feeling, or cognition and emotion. Within Western thought, cognition and emotion have traditionally been conceived as adversaries. However, it is also possible to understand emotion within a cognitive framework, or to treat cognition and emotion as integrated neural networks. These and other perspectives on the relation between cognition and emotion are studied and debated within the pages of Cognition & Emotion. Cognition and Emotion has an interdisciplinary orientation and publishes contributions from cognitive psychology, social psychology, personality psychology, developmental psychology, psychophysiology, and cognitive neuroscience.

The idea for Cognition and Emotion was conceived by Fraser Watts and Mark Williams (Oatley, Parrott, Smith, & Watts, 2011). Watts and Williams were trying to understand the role of cognition in emotional disorders, and how these could be treated by cognitive therapy. They noted that the interplay between cognition and emotion was also studied in other fields but there was little communication between these fields. Cognition and Emotion was therefore founded by Watts, who edited the journal between 1987 and 1995. The first article to appear in Cognition and Emotion was a theoretical article by Howard Leventhal and Klaus Scherer (Leventhal & Scherer, 1987).

Subsequent editors-in-chief were Gerrod W. Parrott (1995–1999), Craig Smith (2000–2007, Jan De Houwer and Dirk Hermans (2008–2012), and Agneta Fischer and Carien van Reekum (2013–2017). As of 2017, the editors-in-chief are Sander L. Koole (Vrije Universiteit Amsterdam) and Klaus Rothermund (University of Jena). In a brief review article for the 30th anniversary of the journal, Rothermund and Koole (2018) distinguished three periods in the history of Cognition and Emotion. The first period, from 1987 to 1999, was a pioneering time when cognitive theories began to be applied to the scientific analysis of emotion. The second period, from 2000 to 2007, had a marked increase in the number of empirical research papers, many of which were concerned with automatic processing biases and their implications for clinical psychology. During the third period, from 2008 to 2018, a new focus emerged on self-regulatory processes and how these influence emotion.

Cognition and Emotion is currently published eight times per year by Routledge. The journal publishes empirical articles, review articles, and theoretical articles. As of 2020, Cognition and Emotion features a new section that is exclusively focused on theory development (Rothermund & Koole, 2020). The Theory section is edited by Klaus Scherer. The majority of contributions to the journal are submitted by individual researchers or research teams. Most years, however, the journal also publishes Special Issues, which consist of a collection of articles that are centred around a specific theme. Some of the most recent Special Issues focused on emotional collectives (Van Kleef & Fischer, 2016), anxiety and depression (Eysenck & Fajkowska, 2018), horizons of cognition and emotion research (Koole & Rothermund, 2019), automatic processes in evaluative learning (Hütter & Rothermund, 2020), and alexithymia (Luminet, Nielson, & Ridout, 2021).

According to the Journal Citation Reports, the journal has a 2020 impact factor of 2.679. Within Cognitive and Experimental Psychology, it is a Q2 journal according to Scimago.
