= Behavioral and Brain Sciences =

- Discipline: Life sciences, behavioral sciences, biology, neuroscience, psychology, genetics, psychiatry
- Language: English
- Edited by: Paul Bloom, Barbara L. Finlay

Publication details
- History: 1978–present
- Publisher: Cambridge University Press
- Frequency: Bimonthly
- Impact factor: 29.3 (2022)

Standard abbreviations
- ISO 4: Behav. Brain Sci.

Indexing
- CODEN: BBSCDH
- ISSN: 0140-525X (print); 1469-1825 (web)
- LCCN: 79649226
- OCLC no.: 4172559

Links
- Journal homepage

Behavioral and Brain Sciences is a bimonthly peer-reviewed scientific journal of Open Peer Commentary established in 1978 by Stevan Harnad and published by Cambridge University Press. According to the Journal Citation Reports, the journal has a 2022 impact factor of 29.3.

== History and structure of publications ==
Behavioral and Brain Sciences is modeled on the journal Current Anthropology (which was established in 1959 by the University of Chicago anthropologist, Sol Tax).

The journal publishes "target articles" followed by 10 to 30 or more peer commentaries and the response of the authors of the target article. The journal covers all areas of the biobehavioral and cognitive sciences (psychology, neuroscience, behavioral biology, cognitive science, artificial intelligence, linguistics, philosophy) and articles are judged by four or more referees to be of sufficient importance and interdisciplinary scope to merit Open Peer Commentary. Volume 1 appeared in 1978 and issues appeared quarterly; as its popularity grew it switched to a bimonthly schedule in 1997.
