= Gary Evans (psychologist) =

American psychologist (born 1948)

Gary W. Evans
- Born: November 22, 1948 (age 77)
- Citizenship: American
- Education: Colgate University; University of Massachusetts, Amherst
- Known for: Research on mental health effects of child poverty
- Awards: National Research Service Award from the National Institute for Child Health and Human Development (1999)
- Scientific career
- Fields: Developmental psychology Environmental psychology
- Workplaces: Cornell University
- Thesis: Behavioral and physiological consequences of crowding in humans (1975)

Gary William Evans (born November 22, 1948) is the Elizabeth Lee Vincent Professor of Human Ecology in the Cornell University College of Human Ecology. He is known for researching the mental health and physiological consequences of exposure to poverty and stress during childhood.

== Honors and awards ==
In 2006, Evans received an honorary doctorate from Stockholm University. In 2013, he received a Guggenheim Fellowship in psychology.
