= Triarchic theory of intelligence =

Theory of human intelligence formulated by Robert Sternberg

The triarchic theory of intelligence or three forms of intelligence, formulated by psychologist Robert Sternberg, aims to go against the psychometric approach to intelligence and take a more cognitive approach, which leaves it to the category of the cognitive-contextual theories. The three meta components are also called triarchic components.

Sternberg's definition of human intelligence is "(a) mental activity directed toward purposive adaptation to, selection and shaping of, real-world environments relevant to one's life". Thus, Sternberg viewed intelligence as how well an individual deals with environmental changes throughout their lifespan. Sternberg's theory comprises three parts: componential, experiential and practical.

Sternberg's theory has since been expanded and advanced in the book Experiential Intelligence by Soren Kaplan.

== Different components of information processing ==
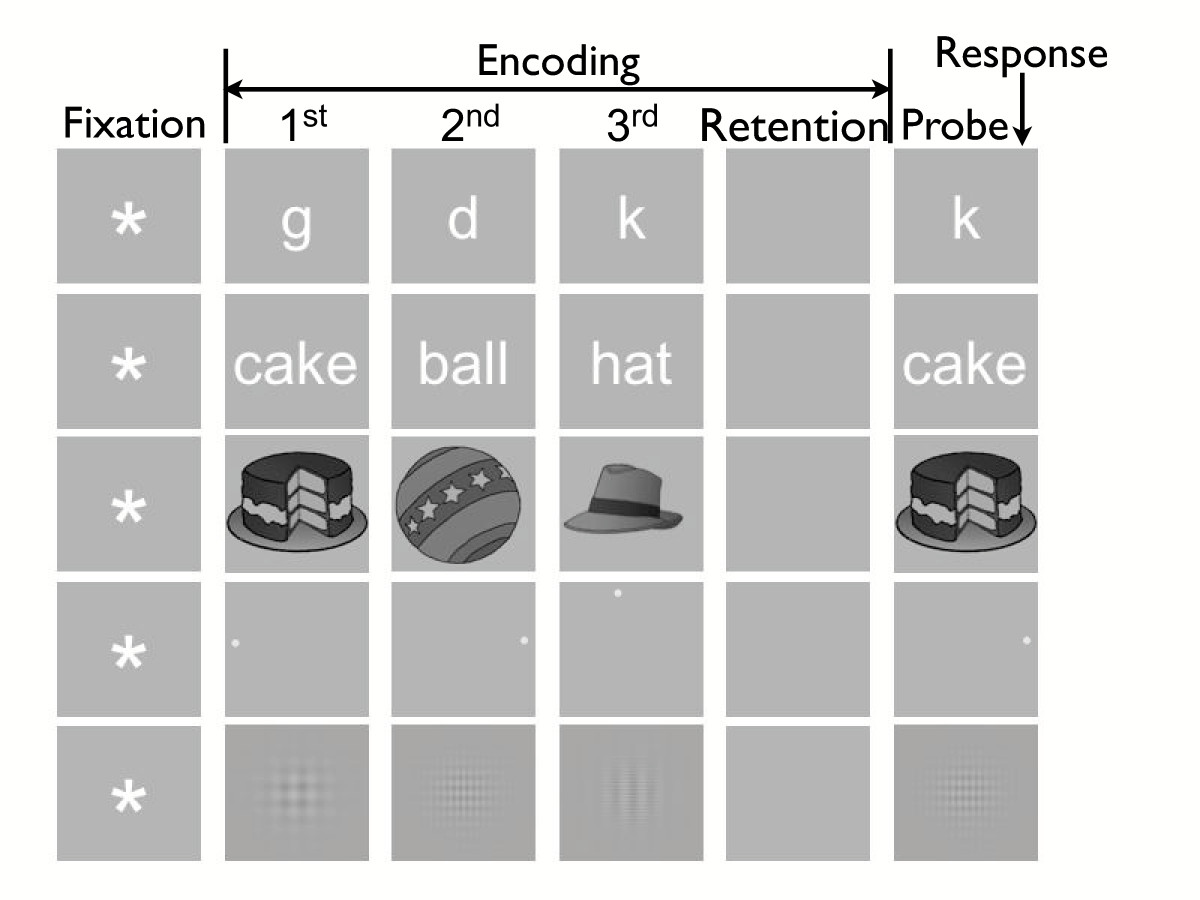
Schematic illustrating one trial of each stimulus pool in the Sternberg task: letter, word, object, spatial, grating

Sternberg associated the workings of the mind with a series of components. These components he labeled the metacomponents, performance components, and knowledge-acquisition components.

The metacomponents are executive processes used in problem solving and decision making that involve the majority of managing our mind. They tell the mind how to act. Metacomponents are also sometimes referred to as a homunculus. A homunculus is a fictitious or metaphorical "person" inside our head that controls our actions, and which is often seen to invite an infinite regress of homunculi controlling each other.

Sternberg's next set of components, performance components, are the processes that actually carry out the actions the metacomponents dictate. These are the basic processes that allow us to do tasks, such as perceiving problems in our long-term memory, perceiving relations between objects, and applying relations to another set of terms.

The last set of components, knowledge-acquisition components, are used in obtaining new information. These components complete tasks that involve selectively choosing relevant information from a mix of information, some of it relevant and some of it irrelevant. These components can also be used to selectively combine the various pieces of information they have gathered. Gifted individuals are proficient in using these components because they are able to learn new information at a greater rate.

Whereas Sternberg explains that the basic information processing components underlying the three parts of his triarchic theory are the same, different contexts and different tasks require different kinds of intelligence.

=== Componential – analytical subtheory ===
This form of intelligence focuses on academic proficiency.

Sternberg associated the componential subtheory with analytical giftedness. This is one of three types of giftedness that Sternberg recognizes. Analytical giftedness is influential in being able to take apart problems and being able to see solutions not often seen. Unfortunately, individuals with only this type are not as adept at creating unique ideas of their own. This form of giftedness is the type that is tested most often.

=== Experiential – creative subtheory ===
This form of intelligence focuses on "capacity to be intellectually flexible and innovative.

The experiential subtheory is the second stage of the triarchic theory. This stage deals mainly with how well a task is performed with regard to how familiar it is. Sternberg splits the role of experience into two parts: novelty and automation.

A novel situation is one that has not been experienced before. People that are adept at managing a novel situation can take the task and find new ways of solving it that the majority of people would not notice.

A process that has been automated has been performed multiple times and can now be done with little or no extra thought. Once a process is automatized, it can be run in parallel with the same or other processes. The problem with novelty and automation is that being skilled in one component does not ensure that you are skilled in the other.

The experiential subtheory also correlates with another one of Sternberg's proposed types of giftedness. Synthetic giftedness is seen in creativity, intuition, and a study of the arts. People with synthetic giftedness are not often seen with the highest IQs because there are not currently any tests that can sufficiently measure these attributes, but synthetic giftedness is especially useful in creating new ideas to create and solve new problems. Sternberg also associated another one of his students, "Barbara", to the synthetic giftedness. Barbara did not perform as well as Alice on the tests taken to get into school, but was recommended to Yale University based on her exceptional creative and intuitive skills. Barbara was later very valuable in creating new ideas for research.

=== Practical – contextual subtheory ===
Sternberg's third subtheory of intelligence, called practical or contextual, "deals with the mental activity involved in attaining fit to context". Through the three processes of adaptation, shaping, and selection, individuals create an ideal fit between themselves and their environment. This type of intelligence is often referred to as "street smarts."

Adaptation occurs when one makes a change within oneself in order to better adjust to one's surroundings. For example, when the weather changes and temperatures drop, people adapt by wearing extra layers of clothing to remain warm.

Shaping occurs when one changes their environment to better suit one's needs. A teacher may invoke the new rule of raising hands to speak to ensure that the lesson is taught with least possible disruption.

The process of selection is undertaken when a completely new alternate environment is found to replace the previous, unsatisfying environment to meet the individual's goals. For instance, immigrants leave their lives in their homeland countries where they endure economical and social hardships and go to other countries in search of a better and less strained life.

The effectiveness with which an individual fits to his or her environment and contends with daily situations reflects degree of intelligence. Sternberg's third type of giftedness, called practical giftedness, involves the ability to apply synthetic and analytic skills to everyday situations. Practically gifted people are superb in their ability to succeed in any setting. An example of this type of giftedness is "Celia". Celia did not have outstanding analytical or synthetic abilities, but she "was highly successful in figuring out what she needed to do in order to succeed in an academic environment. She knew what kind of research was valued, how to get articles into journals, how to impress people at job interviews, and the like". Celia's contextual intelligence allowed her to use these skills to her best advantage.

Sternberg also acknowledges that an individual is not restricted to having excellence in only one of these three intelligences. Many people may possess an integration of all three and have high levels of all three intelligences.

Practical intelligence is also a topic covered by Canadian journalist Malcolm Gladwell in his book Outliers: The Story of Success.

== Criticism ==
Psychologist Linda Gottfredson criticises the unempirical nature of triarchic theory. Further, she argues it is absurd to assert that traditional intelligence tests are not measuring practical intelligence, given that they show a moderate correlation with income, especially at middle age when individuals have had a chance to reach their maximum career potential, and an even higher correlation with occupational prestige, and that IQ tests predict the ability to stay out of jail and stay alive (all of which qualifies as practical intelligence or "street smarts"). Gottfredson claims that what Sternberg calls practical intelligence is not a broad aspect of cognition at all but simply a specific set of skills people learn to cope with a specific environment (task specific knowledge).

There is evidence to suggest that certain aspects of creativity (i.e. divergent thinking) are separable from analytical intelligence, and are better accounted for by the cognitive process of executive functioning. More specifically, task-switching and interference management are suggested to play an important role in divergent thinking. A more recent meta-analysis found only small correlations between IQ and creativity.

== See also ==
- Educational psychology
- J. P. Guilford
- Multiple intelligence

== Bibliography ==
- Gottfredson L (2003). "Dissecting practical intelligence theory: Its claims and its evidence". Intelligence. 31 (4): 343–397. doi:10.1016/s0160-2896(02)00085-5.
- Sternberg, R. J. (1985). Beyond IQ: A Triarchic Theory of Intelligence. Cambridge University Press.
- Sternberg, R. J. (1997). "A Triarchic View of Giftedness: Theory and Practice". In Coleangelo; Davis (eds.). Handbook of Gifted Education. pp. 43–53.
- Sternberg, R. J.; Nokes, C.; Geissler, W.; Prince, P.; Okatcha, F.; Bundy, D.A.; Grigorenke, E.L. (2001). "The relationship between academic and practical intelligence: a case study in Kenya". Intelligence. 29 (5): 401–418. doi:10.1016/S0160-2896(01)00065-4.
- Kim, K. H. (2005). "Can Only Intelligent People Be Creative? A Meta-Analysis". The Journal of Secondary Gifted Education. 16 (2–3): 57. doi:10.4219/jsge-2005-473. S2CID 49475973.
