= Society for Applied Research in Memory and Cognition =

Society for Applied Research in Memory and Cognition (SARMAC) is an international scholarly society founded in 1994. The purpose of the organization is to enhance collaboration and co-operation between basic and applied researchers in memory and cognition.

The society publishes the Journal of Applied Research in Memory and Cognition. The current president of SARMAC is Christian A. Meissner of University of Texas, El Paso. From 2008 to 2012, the president was Maryanne Garry of Victoria University of Wellington. The executive director is Kaz Mori of Tokyo University of Agriculture and Technology. SARMAC has 216 regular and 95 faculty members. At present SARMAC has officers and directors from Europe, Asia, Australia, and North America.
