= Child Development Perspectives =

- Discipline: Developmental psychology
- Language: English
- Edited by: Rob Kail

Publication details
- History: 2007-present
- Publisher: Wiley-Blackwell on behalf of the Society for Research in Child Development
- Frequency: Quarterly
- Impact factor: 3.911 (2016)

Standard abbreviations
- ISO 4: Child Dev. Perspect.

Indexing
- ISSN: 1750-8592 (print); 1750-8606 (web)
- LCCN: 2007239327
- OCLC no.: 174114249

Links
- Journal homepage; Online access; Online archive; Journal page at society's website

Child Development Perspectives is a quarterly peer-reviewed academic journal published by Wiley-Blackwell on behalf of the Society for Research in Child Development. Its editor-in-chief is Rob Kail. The journal aims to publish short articles on emerging subjects of inquiry in developmental science. According to the Journal Citation Reports, the journal has a 2016 impact factor of 3.911, ranking it 8th out of 70 journals in the category "Psychology, Developmental".
