= Child Development (journal) =

- Discipline: Developmental psychology
- Language: English
- Edited by: Glenn Roisman

Publication details
- History: 1930–present
- Publisher: Wiley-Blackwell on behalf of the Society for Research in Child Development.
- Frequency: Bimonthly
- Impact factor: 5.024 (2018)

Standard abbreviations
- ISO 4: Child Dev.

Indexing
- CODEN: CHDEAW
- ISSN: 0009-3920 (print); 1467-8624 (web)
- LCCN: e34000503
- OCLC no.: 641792335

Links
- Journal homepage; Online access; Online archive

Child Development is a bimonthly peer-reviewed academic journal covering developmental psychology from the fetal period to adolescence. It was established in 1930 and the editor-in-chief is Glenn Roisman. It is published by Wiley-Blackwell on behalf of the Society for Research in Child Development. The journal publishes original contributions on topics in child development from the fetal period through adolescence.

== Abstracting and indexing ==
The journal is abstracted and indexed in:

- PubMed
- PsycINFO
- PsycLIT
- Scopus
- Social Sciences Citation Index

According to the Journal Citation Reports, the journal has a 2018 impact factor of 5.024.
