= Ban Tsui =

Canadian doctor

Ban Chi Ho Tsui
- 徐志豪
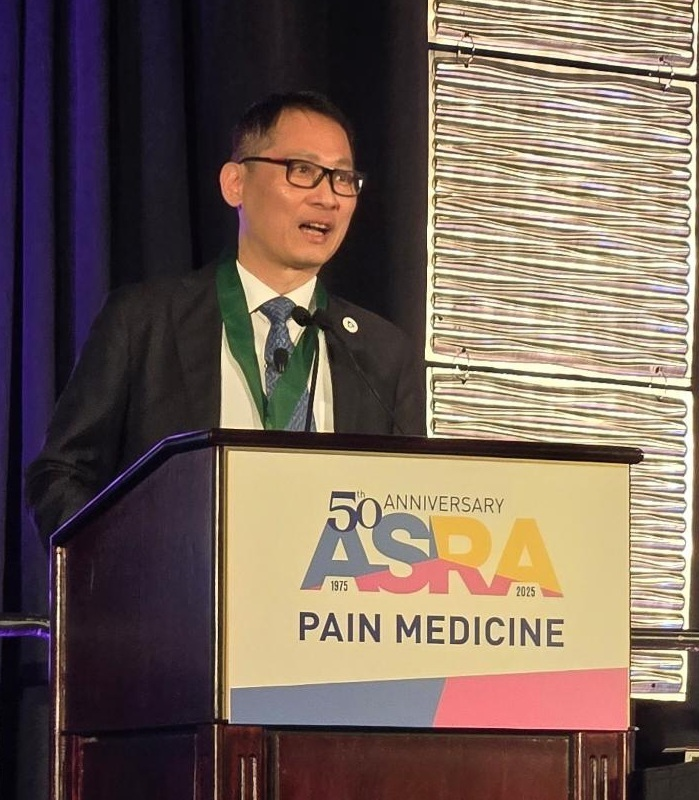
- Ban Tsui delivering Gaston Labat Award Lecture, Orlando, Florida, 2025
- Born: Hong Kong
- Education: Dalhousie University
- Scientific career
- Fields: Anesthesiology
- Workplaces: University of Alberta, Stanford University, The Chinese University of Hong Kong, Shenzhen

Ban Chi Ho Tsui (Chinese: 徐志豪; Jyutping: ceoi4 zi3 hou4) is a Chinese-Canadian anesthesiologist and researcher.

Dr. Tsui serves as the Associate Dean; Head of Clinical Medicine & Hospital Network; Chair and Chief, Department of Anesthesiology, Critical Care, and Pain Medicine at The Chinese University of Hong Kong, Shenzhen. At Stanford University he is an Adjunct Professor of Anesthesiology, Perioperative and Pain Medicine.

== Education ==
Dr. Tsui completed a Diploma in Engineering, a BSc in Mathematics and a BSc in Pharmacy from Dalhousie University, Halifax, Nova Scotia. He graduated with a MSc in Pharmacy in 1991 from Dalhousie University and completed his MD in 1995 from Dalhousie University. He completed his residency in anesthesiology at the University of Alberta in 2000 and received a Postgraduate Diploma in Peri-operative and Critical Care Echocardiography from Melbourne University, Australia.

== Career ==
Dr. Tsui has published over 150 articles and letters (110 articles and 59 letters) covering clinical and basic research. He is the founding chair for Regional Anesthesia Cardiothoracic Enhanced Recovery (RACER) Special interest group (SIG) for the Society of Cardiovascular Anesthesiologists; and the American Society of Regional Anesthesia. Dr. Tsui was the founding chair for the Ultrasound regional and POCUS SIG (ULT-RA POCUS) with the Society of Pediatric Anesthesia.

Dr. Tsui is the author of the first textbook describing how to use ultrasound together with nerve stimulation to perform regional anesthesia, titled "Atlas of Ultrasound and Nerve Stimulation-Guided Regional Anesthesia" and is a co-author of Principles of Airway Management (4th edition); he has also contributed 17 book chapters to several anesthesiology textbooks. In addition, Dr. Tsui is the co-author of the first regional anesthesia in using ultrasound for pediatric patients, entitled "Pediatric Atlas of Ultrasound and Nerve Stimulation-Guided Regional Anesthesia Regional Anesthesia".

Previously at Stanford University Dr. Tsui served as the Associate Chief and the director of research for the division of regional anesthesia with the Department of Anesthesiology, Perioperative and Pain medicine. He was also the Director of Stanford University Pediatric Regional Anesthesia (SUPRA) at Lucile Packard Children's Hospital Stanford. Dr Tsui previously held the position of Professor of Anesthesiology and Pain Medicine at the University of Alberta and was the Director of the Regional Anesthesia and Acute Pain Service at the University of Alberta Hospital and the Site Chief for Anesthesia at the Cross Cancer Institute in Edmonton.

Dr. Tsui is an academic researcher focusing on the fields of regional anesthesia and pain medicine. Examples include describing the Tsui Test and developing the StimuLong Sono-Tsui for ease of pediatric epidural placement. Along with his son, Dr. Jonathan Jenkin Tsui, Dr. Tsui developed a catheter-over-needle kit allowing a continuous catheter placement to be performed with the ease of a single shot during peripheral nerve blocks.

He holds the position of Associate Editor for the Regional Anesthesia and Pain Medicine Journal (2006–2022) for over 16 years and was promoted to Editor for the Regional Anesthesia and Pain Medicine Journal in 2022, He has also been an Editorial Board Member for the Canadian Journal of Anesthesia (2006–2018) for 12 years.

Dr. Tsui is also a guest reviewer for multiple journals including:

- Anesthesiology
- Anesthesia and Analgesia
- British Journal of Anaesthesia
- Journal of Pain
- Journal of Clinical Microbiology and Infection
- Journal of Clinical Anesthesia
- Yonsei Medical Journal
- Clinical Anatomy
- Acta Anaesthesiologica Scandinavia
- Journal of Otolaryngology
- Ultrasound in Medicine and Biology
- Journal of Clinical Monitoring and Computing
- Paediatrics and Child Health
- Pain Research and Management

== Honours and awards ==
2026: Honorary Fellow, The Hong Kong College of Anaesthesiologists (HKCA)

2026: Fellow of the Academy of Medical Educators (FAcadMEd)

2026: Fellow of the American Society of Anesthesiologists (FASA)

2025: Exceptional Service Award (Dalhousie Medical Alumni Association)

2025: Gaston Labat Award (American Society of Regional Anesthesia and Pain Medicine)

- Given annually, the award honors regional anesthesia pioneer Gaston P. Labat, MD, (1876-1934) and is given to individuals who have demonstrated outstanding contributions to the development, teaching, and practice of regional anesthesia.

2022: Distinguished Service Award (American Society of Regional Anesthesia and Pain Medicine)

- ASRA Pain Medicine annually recognizes someone who has made important contributions to our specialty through our Distinguished Service Award (DSA). Past recipients of the DSA have made extraordinary contributions to the science, teaching, or practice of regional anesthesia and/or pain medicine and often have had active involvement in ASRA Pain Medicine.

2015: Research Recognition Award Recipient (Canadian Anesthesiologists' Society)

- This prestigious award is presented by the Canadian Anesthesiologists' Society to honour a senior investigator who has sustained major contributions in anesthesia research in Canada. "In 2015, this award was presented to Dr. Tsui in recognition of significant research contributions to regional anesthesia, acute pain management and pediatric anesthesia in Canada and around the world."

2014: Dr. RA Gordon Research Award (Canadian Anesthesiologists' Society)

- The Dr. RA Gordon Research Award is given for contributions in anesthesia research.

2014: Alberta Heritage Clinical Scholar Award (Alberta Heritage Foundation for Medical Research)

- The Alberta Heritage Clinical Scholar Award is given to researchers who have had an excellent track record of independent research. Candidates for the award typically have 5 to 10 years experience as independent investigators and are expected to hold the rank of associate professor.

2008: John Bradley Young Educator Award (Canadian Anesthesiologists' Society)

- The John Bradley Young Educator Award is given to recognize excellence and effectiveness in education in anesthesia.

2008: Smiths Medical Canada Ltd. Canadian Research Award in Pain Research and Regional Anesthesia (Canadian Anesthesiologists' Society)

- The Smiths Medical Canada Ltd. Canadian Research Award in Pain Research and Regional Anesthesia is given to provide funding for medical research to researchers who have contributed in novel projects.

2005: Alberta Heritage Clinical Investigator Renewal Award, Alberta Heritage Foundation for Medical Research

- The Alberta Heritage Clinical Investigator Renewal Award is given to allow highly qualified clinicians in the early stages of their careers in health-related research to commit 75% of their time to research.

2004: David S Sheridan Canadian Research Award, Canadian Anesthesiologists' Society

- The David S Sheridan Canadian Research Award is given in recognition of the scientific merit, importance, and feasibility of a project submitted.

== E-Catheter ==
Dr. Tsui is also the co-inventor of the E-catheter, the first non-kinkable catheter over needle which simplified the continuous catheter technique to increase the accuracy and placement and duration of a continuous nerve block. The company Pajunk GmbH & Co. KG Besitzverwaltung manufactures the catheter and it has been adopted in a number of centres around the world. In Canada, the company Dynamedical distributes the catheter kit.

== Tsui Test ==
Dr. Tsui developed the Tsui Test. The Tsui Test is a simple protocol using a low current electrical stimulation test to confirm catheter location in the epidural space during procedures like combined spinal and epidural anesthesia.
