= Tonya M. Palermo =

U.S. pediatric psychologist

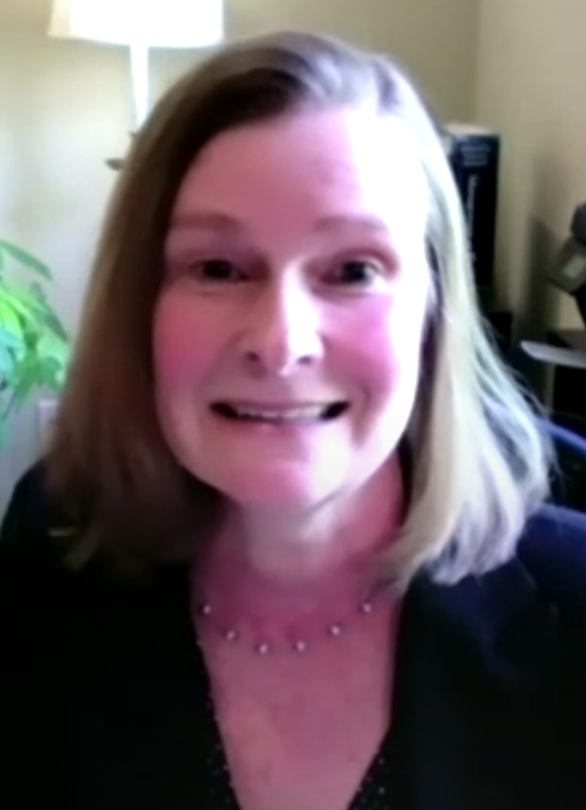
- Palermo in 2023
- Education: University of California, Los Angeles; Case Western Reserve University
- Scientific career
- Fields: Pediatric psychology, pain medicine
- Workplaces: University of Washington

Tonya M. Palermo is an American child psychologist whose research focuses on pediatric pain management. She is a professor of anesthesiology and pain medicine at the University of Washington, where she also serves as the vice chair for research for the department of anesthesiology and pain medicine since 2022. At the Seattle Children's Research Institute, she is the director of the Center for Child Health, Behavior and Development since 2025 and directs the Pediatric Pain & Sleep Innovations Lab. Her research focuses on the intersection of pain, sleep, and psychosocial factors in children, and the development of digital health interventions for chronic pain.

== Education ==
Palermo earned a B.A. in psychology from the University of California, Los Angeles (UCLA) in June 1992. She then attended Case Western Reserve University, where she completed a M.A. in clinical psychology in January 1996 and a Ph.D. in the same field in May 1998.

Palermo completed residency training at Ohio State University. This training took place at Columbus Children's Hospital in 1997. Following her residency, she undertook a postdoctoral fellowship in pediatric pain management at Rainbow Babies & Children's Hospital, which concluded in 1999.

== Career ==
In 2008, Palermo was named a fellow of the American Psychological Association (APA), recognized by Division 54, the Society of Pediatric Psychology. In September 2010, she joined Seattle Children's and was appointed professor of anesthesiology and pain medicine at the University of Washington School of Medicine. She holds adjunct professorships in pediatrics and psychiatry at the university. At Seattle Children's, she directs the Pediatric Pain & Sleep Innovations Lab.

Palermo's research focuses on behavioral and psychosocial factors in children's pain experiences, the relationship between sleep and pain, and the development of psychological treatments for chronic pain. She has developed and assessed internet and mobile applications designed to deliver cognitive behavioral therapy (CBT). Her work has been funded by several institutes within the National Institutes of Health, including the Eunice Kennedy Shriver National Institute of Child Health and Human Development and the National Institute of Neurological Disorders and Stroke. She has published two books on CBT for pediatric chronic pain. She also serves as the editor-in-chief of the Journal of Pain.

In 2012, Palermo received the John J. Bonica Faculty Mentoring Award from the University of Washington's (UW) department of anesthesiology and pain medicine and was elected as a member of the Association for University Anesthesiologists. The following year, she was named an APA Fellow for a second time, this time by Division 43, the Society for Family Psychology. In 2014, she received the Diane Willis Award for Outstanding Article from the Journal of Pediatric Psychology and the Dennis D. Drotar Distinguished Research Award from the Society of Pediatric Psychology. In 2016, the Society of Behavioral Medicine presented Palmero with an Award for Outstanding Achievements in the Field of Child and Family Health.

In 2017, Palermo was named Seattle Health Innovator of the Year in the "Imagination" category, which "recognizes individual achievement in conceiving new ways of solving problems in the health sector". In 2019, she was selected as the Wilbert E. Fordyce lecturer for the UW department of rehabilitation medicine.

On August 1, 2022, Palermo was appointed vice chair for research for the UW department of anesthesiology and pain medicine. She holds the Hughes M. and Katherine Blake Endowed Professorship in Health Psychology. She also directs the T32 postdoctoral training program in anesthesiology research at UW. Palermo was appointed director of the Center for Child Health, Behavior and Development at the Seattle Children's Research Institute on May 15, 2025. She had previously served as its associate director and interim director.
