= UMB =

UMB may refer to:

== Universities ==
- University of Manitoba, a university in Winnipeg, Manitoba, Canada
- Marc Bloch University, also known as Université Marc Bloch (UMB), a university in France
- Norwegian University of Life Sciences (NMBU), a university in Norway, previously known as Universitetet for miljø- og biovitenskap (UMB)
- University of Maryland, Baltimore, a university in Baltimore, Maryland, United States
- University of Massachusetts Boston, a university in Boston, Massachusetts, United States
- Manuela Beltrán University, a university in Bogotá, Colombia
- Marin Barleti University (Universiteti Marin Barleti), a private university in Tirana, Albania
- Matej Bel University (Univerzita Mateja Bela), a public university in Banská Bystrica, Slovakia
- Mercu Buana University, Jakarta, Indonesia

== Other ==
- UMB Financial Corporation, a bank and financial services company in Kansas City, USA
- Upper memory block, a segment of RAM in PCs
- Ultra Mobile Broadband, a one-time proposal for a CDMA-based 4G mobile standard
- Ultrasound in Medicine and Biology, a scholarly journal
- Union Mondiale de Billard, a governing body for carom billiards
- Umberleigh railway station, Devon, England, whose code is UMB
- Umbundu, a language of Angola (code: umb)
- Unreinforced masonry building, a type of building
