= Deanna Kuhn =

American psychologist and academic

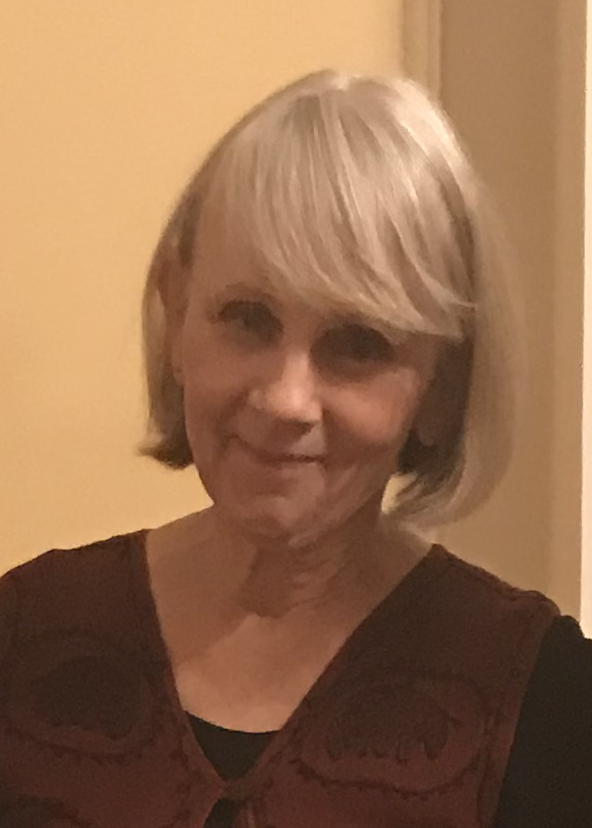
- Born: 1944 (age 81–82)
- Education: University of California, Berkeley
- Occupations: Professor of Psychology and Education
- Employer: Columbia University

Deanna Zipse Kuhn (born 1944) is an American psychologist. She is Professor of Psychology and Education at Columbia University. She is known for contributions to the psychology of science – the scientific study of scientific thought and behavior. Her research program has focused on the development of scientific reasoning skills, critical thinking, metacognition, informal reasoning, and constructivist teaching methods, such as problem-based learning and collaborative learning.

Kuhn is the author of The Skills of Argument – a book examining the development of informal reasoning, which often takes the form of argument or debate. Kuhn's emphasis on argumentation skills as the foundation for critical thinking and analysis is further developed in her book Argue with Me: Argument as a Path to Developing Students' Thinking and Writing, co-authored with Laura Hemberger and Valerie Khait. Other books authored by Kuhn include The Development of Scientific Thinking Skills, Education for Thinking, and Building Our Best Future: Thinking Critically About Ourselves and Our World.

Kuhn is a member of the National Academy of Education and a Fellow of the Association for Psychological Science and the American Psychological Association. She has served as Editor of the journal Cognitive Development and as Editor of the journal Human Development.

== Biography ==
Kuhn completed a Bachelors of Science degree at the University of Illinois. Her first journal article titled Effects of Exposure to an Aggressive Model and "Frustration" on Children's Aggressive Behavior, co-authored with Charles Madsen and Wesley Becker, was based on Kuhn's undergraduate research.

Kuhn continued her education at the University of California, Berkeley where she completed a PhD in Developmental Psychology in 1969 (dissertation title: Patterns of Imitative Behavior in Children from 3 to 8: A Study of Imitation from a Cognitive-Developmental Perspective). Prior to her current position at Teachers College, Columbia university, Kuhn was on the faculty of the Graduate School of Education, Harvard University. Her research has been funded by grants from the Institute of Education Sciences and other agencies.

== Research ==
Deanna Kuhn is a Developmental Psychologist interested in the development of scientific reasoning, argumentation, and critical thinking skills. Much of her research has focused on middle childhood (8-13 year olds) and the importance of teaching argumentative reasoning and debate as means of developing the critical thinking and informal reasoning skills necessary for lifelong learning. Kuhn's Education for Thinking project aims "to teach children how to use their minds – how to think and learn – so that as adults they will be able and disposed to acquire whatever new knowledge and skills they may need." Under this view teachers should act as facilitators who encourage students to be responsible for their own learning. Education for Thinking emphasizes the importance of teaching children skills of inquiry that enable them to seek answers to questions they find worth asking and skills of argument that enable them to support their claims with what they know and evaluate the claims of others.

In The Skills of Argument, Kuhn discusses argumentation as a form of problem-based learning. She describes the use of open-ended questions such as, "What causes prisoners to return to crime after they are released?" "What causes unemployment?" or "What causes children to fail in school?" as a means of developing students' informal reasoning skills through debate. People have a tendency to exhibit confirmation bias: they readily identify evidence in support of their views, but fail to consider evidence that might falsify their views. Providing opportunities for students to debate ideas with peers may foster the development of critical thinking skills by encouraging them to consider multiple points of view.

Kuhn's co-authored monograph Strategies of Knowledge Acquisition explains knowledge acquisition as a process of coordinating new evidence with existing theories. In this study, the authors used a microgenetic method to examine strategies used by college students and preadolescent children in acquiring knowledge in physical and social domains. Participants used a variety of strategies to solve problems and did not always rely on the most effective strategies within their individual repertories. Kuhn and her colleagues discuss the importance of metacognitive abilities to reflect on one's knowledge and manage the choice of problem solving strategies in cognitive development.

== Publications (selection) ==
- Kuhn, D. (1993). Science as argument: Implications for teaching and learning scientific thinking. Science Education, 77(3), 319–337.
- Kuhn, D. (1989). Children and adults as intuitive scientists. Psychological Review, 96(4), 674–689.
- Kuhn, D. (1992). Thinking as argument. Harvard Educational Review, 62(2), 155–179.
- Kuhn, D. (1995). Microgenetic study of change: What has it told us?. Psychological Science, 6(3), 133–139.
- Kuhn, D. (1999). A developmental model of critical thinking. Educational Researcher, 28(2), 16–46.
- Kuhn, D. (2000). Metacognitive development. Current Directions in Psychological Science, 9(5), 178–181.
- Kuhn, D., Garcia-Mila, M., Zohar, A., & Andersen, White, S. H.; Klahr, D., Carver, S. M. (1995). Strategies of Knowledge Acquisition. Monographs of the Society for Research in Child Development, 60(4): i–157.
