= Elizabeth Murray (doctor) =

British medical researcher (1960–2023)

Elizabeth Murray FRCGP FRCP FHEA
- Born: 8 February 1960
- Died: 7 April 2023 (aged 63)
- Education: University of Oxford
- Occupations: General Practitioner, Researcher
- Employer: University College London

Elizabeth Murray (8 February 1960 – 7 April 2023) was a British general practitioner and professor of e-health and primary care at University College London. In 2003 she established the eHealth Unit at UCL where she was co-director, and she was also Deputy Director of the UCL Institute of Healthcare Engineering.

== Education ==
Murray graduated with a B.A. in Physiological Sciences from St Hilda's College, Oxford in 1981, followed by an MSc in Clinical Medicine from Wolfson College, Oxford in 1982. In 2001 Murray was awarded a PhD in Medical Education from the University of Maastricht.

== Career and research ==
Murray's research focused on the use of digital health to improve health and health care. She had a specific focus on the development, evaluation and implementation of digital health interventions. Murray's research was highly interdisciplinary, and involved collaboration with human computer interaction and computer scientists, biomedical and health service research methods.

In 2001, Murray was awarded a Harkness Fellowship in Health Care Policy at the University of California, San Francisco. On her return to the UK, Murray was awarded a Department of Health Career Scientist Award (2002–2007). In 2003, Murray set up the UCL eHealth Unit focused on multidisciplinary research in eHealth. With colleagues at the eHealth Unit, Murray set up a not-for-profit Community Interest Company, HeLP Digital, to disseminate evidence-based digital health interventions developed at UCL across the NHS and internationally.

Through HeLP Digital, Murray developed a programme to help people with Type 2 diabetes by providing evidence-based information and support online (HeLP-Diabetes), with funding by the NIHR. NHS England announced it will be rolling out the HeLP-Diabetes programme nationally in 2020, following trials across 11 areas of the UK.

Murray was a member of the Steering Group for Public Health England workstream on evaluation of digital health interventions, a member of the NHSE Diabetes Programme Board, and a member of the Public Health England Behavioural Science Advisory Board.

== Personal life and death ==
In 2018, Murray entered into a civil partnership with Debby Lennard, a senior civil servant. Murray was diagnosed with breast cancer in 2022, and died on 7 April 2023, at the age of 63. She was survived by her partner, Debby.
