= Yonsei =

Yonsei may refer to:

- Yonsei (Japanese diaspora), descendants of Japanese emigrants
- Yonsei University, a private university in Seoul
  - Severance Hospital, hospital affiliated with Yonsei University
- Yonsei Medical Journal, general medical journal
