= AB-5'F-BUTINACA =

Clinical data
- Drug class: Cannabinoid CB_{1} receptor agonist
- ATC code: None

Identifiers
- IUPAC name: N-(1-amino-3-methyl-1-oxobutan-2-yl)-1-butyl-5-fluoroindazole-3-carboxamide
- PubChem CID: 177924585

Chemical and physical data
- Formula: C_{17}H_{23}FN_{4}O_{2}
- Molar mass: 334.395 g·mol^{−1}
- 3D model (JSmol): Interactive image
- SMILES: CCCCN1C2=C(C=C(C=C2)F)C(=N1)C(=O)NC(C(C)C)C(=O)N
- InChI: InChI=1S/C17H23FN4O2/c1-4-5-8-22-13-7-6-11(18)9-12(13)15(21-22)17(24)20-14(10(2)3)16(19)23/h6-7,9-10,14H,4-5,8H2,1-3H3,(H2,19,23)(H,20,24); Key:INFPTRNVDSIRRH-UHFFFAOYSA-N

AB-5'F-BUTINACA is a synthetic cannabinoid of the indazole family.

It is a potent full agonist of the cannabinoid CB_{1} receptor, with an EC_{50} of 18.7 nM and an E_{max} relative to JWH-018 of 107%. In addition to its cannabinoid CB_{1} receptor agonism, AB-5'F-BUTINACA is also a very-low-potency serotonin 5-HT_{2A} receptor partial agonist, with an EC_{50} of greater than 10,000 nM and an E_{max} relative to LSD of 67.3%. The drug was the most efficacious serotonin 5-HT_{2A} receptor agonist of a series of assessed synthetic cannabinoids. However, due to its very low potency, this action may not be pharmacologically relevant.

AB-5'F-BUTINACA produces effects in rodents including neurological changes, sensorimotor alterations, analgesia, hypothermia, bradypnea, hypolocomotion, convulsions, and hyperreflexia. These effects can be variably reversed by the selective cannabinoid CB_{1} receptor antagonist NESS-0327 and by the selective serotonin 5-HT_{2A} receptor antagonist volinanserin (MDL-100907). The drug did not produce the head-twitch response, a behavioral proxy of psychedelic effects, in rodents. It is said to be unclear whether the serotonin 5-HT_{2A} receptor involvement in AB-5'F-BUTINACA's effects is due to direct interaction with this receptor or mere endocannabinoid system modulation of the serotonin system.

The chemical synthesis of AB-5'F-BUTINACA has been described.

AB-5'F-BUTINACA was first described in the scientific literature by 2025.

== See also ==
- List of miscellaneous serotonin 5-HT_{2A} receptor agonists
