= Christy Holland =

American scientist

- Occupation: Professor

Academic background
- Education: Wellesley College, Yale University

Academic work
- Discipline: Medical physics
- Sub-discipline: ultrasound technology
- Institutions: University of Cincinnati
- Notable works: Mechanical Index
- Website: http://www.med.uc.edu/ultrasound/people/hollandck

Christy Katherine Smith Holland is an American scientist and professor of internal medicine and biomedical engineering at the University of Cincinnati. After a B.A. with majors in physics and music at Wellesley College, she obtained her Ph.D.in engineering and applied science from Yale University. Holland was editor-in-chief of Ultrasound in Medicine and Biology from 2006-2021. Holland's articles in peer-reviewed scientific journals have been cited over 11,000 times, giving her an h-index of 60.

== Honors ==
Holland is a fellow of the Acoustical Society of America, the American Institute of Ultrasound in Medicine, the American Institute for Medical and Biological Engineering., and the IEEE.
