= Ontogenetic parade =

Developmental psychology term for childhood fears progression

In developmental psychology, the ontogenetic parade is the term introduced by Isaac Marks for the predictable pattern of the development of normal childhood fears: emergence, plateau, and decline.
