= Mechanical index =

Mechanical index (MI) is a unitless ultrasound metric originally developed by Robert Apfel and Christy Holland. It is defined as

$$\text{MI} = \frac{P_r}{\sqrt{f_c}},$$

where

- P_{r} is the peak rarefaction pressure of the ultrasound wave (MPa), derated by an attenuation factor to account for in-tissue acoustic attenuation
- f_{c} is the center frequency of the ultrasound pulse (MHz).

MI is measured with a calibrated hydrophone in a tank of degassed water. The pulse pressure amplitudes are measured along the central axis of the ultrasound beam. The P_{r} is calculated by reducing it using an attenuation coefficient of 0.3 dB/cm/MHz.

MI is a unitless number that can be used as an index of cavitation bio-effects; a higher MI value indicates greater exposure. Levels below 0.3 are generally considered to have no detectable effects. Currently the FDA stipulates that diagnostic ultrasound scanners cleared using the 510(k) pathway cannot exceed a mechanical index of 1.9.
