= Developmental psychology =

Scientific study of psychological changes in humans over the course of their lives

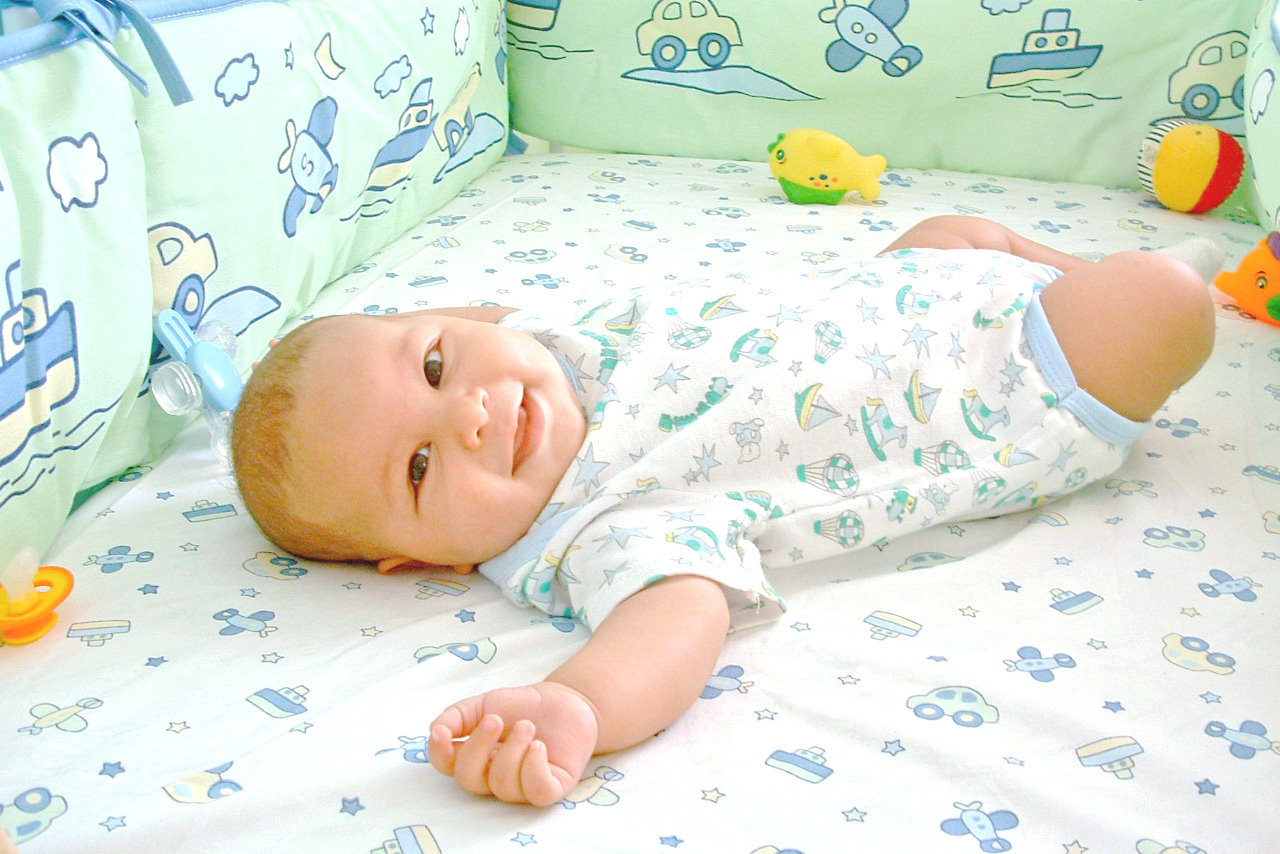
Special methods are used in the psychological study of infants.

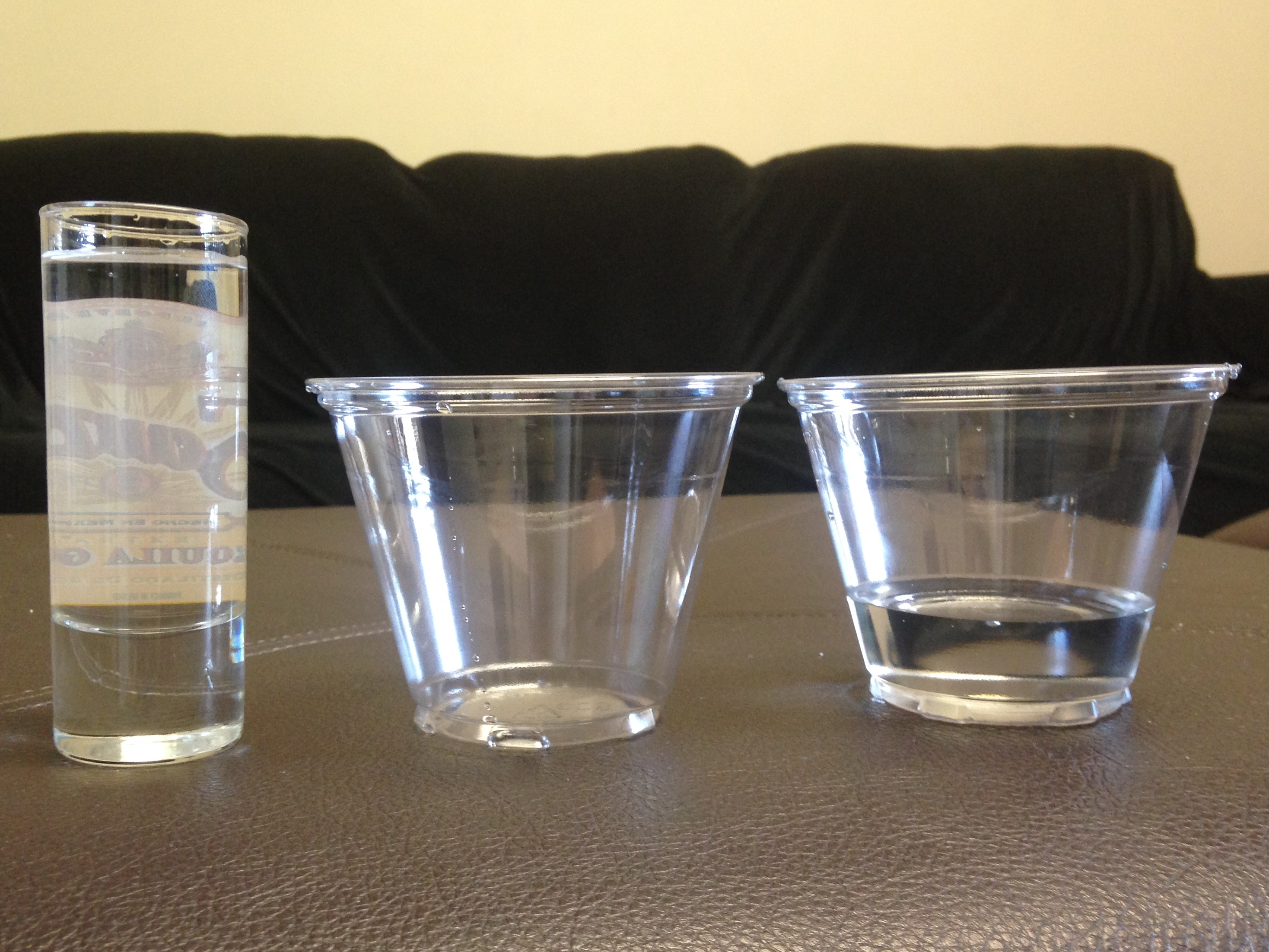
Piaget's test for Conservation. One of the many experiments used for children.

Developmental psychology is the scientific study of how and why the human mind grows, changes, and adapts over the course of a human lifetime. Originally concerned with infants and children, the field has expanded to include adolescence, adult development, aging, and the entire lifespan. Developmental psychologists aim to explain how thinking, feeling, and behaviors change throughout life. This field examines change across three major dimensions, which are physical development, cognitive development, and social emotional development. Within these three dimensions are a broad range of topics including motor skills, executive functions, moral understanding, language acquisition, social change, personality, emotional development, self-concept, and identity formation.

Developmental psychology explores the influence of both nature and nurture on human development, as well as the processes of change that occur across different contexts over time. Many researchers are interested in the interactions among personal characteristics, the individual's behavior, and environmental factors, including the social context and the built environment. Ongoing debates regarding developmental psychology include biological essentialism vs. neuroplasticity, and stages of development vs. dynamic systems of development. While research in developmental psychology has certain limitations, ongoing studies aim to understand how life stage transitions and biological factors influence human behavior and development.

Developmental psychology is related to a range of fields, such as educational psychology, child psychopathology, forensic developmental psychology, child development, cognitive psychology, ecological psychology, and cultural psychology. Influential developmental psychologists from the 20th century include Urie Bronfenbrenner, Erik Erikson, Sigmund Freud, Jean Piaget, Mary Ainsworth, John H. Flavell, and Lev Vygotsky.

== Historical antecedents ==
Jean-Jacques Rousseau and John B. Watson are typically cited as providing the foundation for modern developmental psychology. In the mid-18th century, Jean Jacques Rousseau described three stages of development: infants (infancy), puer (childhood) and adolescence in Emile: Or, On Education. Rousseau's ideas were adopted and supported by educators at the time.

Developmental psychology generally focuses on how and why certain changes (cognitive, social, intellectual, personality) occur over time in the course of a human life. Many theorists have made a profound contribution to this area of psychology. One of them is the psychologist Erik Erikson, who created a model of eight phases of psychosocial development. According to his theory, people go through different phases in their lives, each of which has its own developmental crisis that shapes a person's personality and behavior.

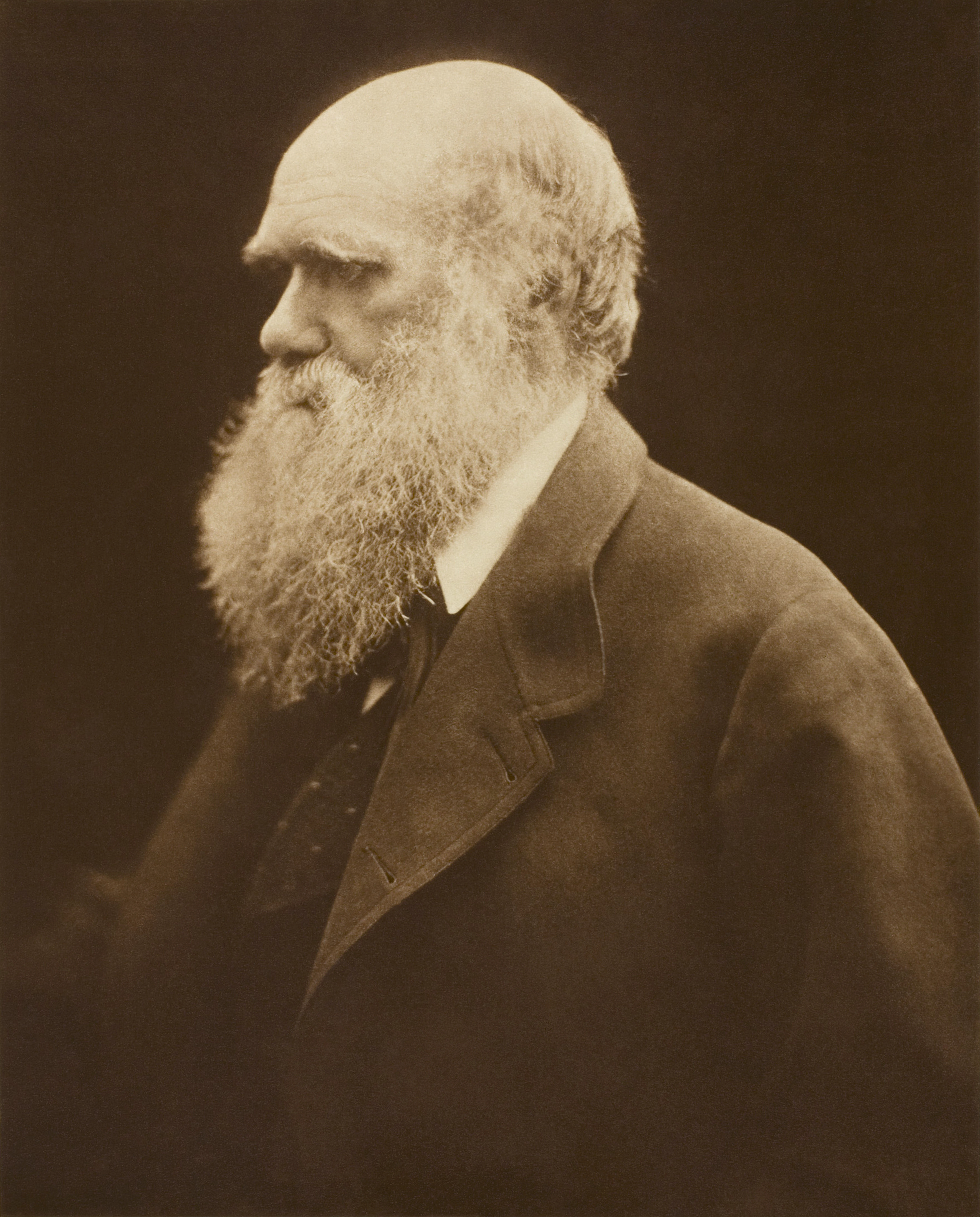
Charles Darwin

In the late 19th century, psychologists familiar with the evolutionary theory of Darwin began seeking an evolutionary description of psychological development; prominent here was the pioneering psychologist G. Stanley Hall, who attempted to correlate ages of childhood with previous ages of humanity. James Mark Baldwin, who wrote essays on topics that included Imitation: A Chapter in the Natural History of Consciousness and Mental Development in the Child and the Race: Methods and Processes, was significantly involved in the theory of developmental psychology. Sigmund Freud, whose concepts were developmental, significantly affected public perceptions.

== Theories ==
=== Psychosexual development ===
Sigmund Freud developed a theory that suggested that humans behave as they do because they are constantly seeking pleasure. This process of seeking pleasure changes through stages because people evolve. Each period of seeking pleasure that a person experiences is represented by a stage of psychosexual development. These stages symbolize the process of becoming a mature adult.

The first is the oral stage, which begins at birth and ends around a year and a half of age. During the oral stage, the child finds pleasure in behaviors like sucking and other mouth-related activities. The second is the anal stage, from about a year or a year and a half to three years of age. During the anal stage, the child defecates from the anus and is often fascinated with defecation. This period of development often occurs during toilet training. The child becomes interested in feces and urine. Children begin to see themselves as independent from their parents. They begin to desire assertiveness and autonomy.

The third is the phallic stage, which occurs from ages 3 to 5 (most of a person's personality forms by this age). During the phallic stage, the child becomes aware of its sexual organs. Pleasure comes from finding acceptance and love from the opposite sex. The fourth is the latency stage, which occurs from age five until puberty. During the latency stage, the child's sexual interests are repressed.

Stage five is the genital stage, which occurs from puberty through adulthood. During the genital stage, puberty begins. Children have now matured and begin to think about other people instead of just themselves. Pleasure comes from feelings of affection from other people.

Freud believed there is tension between the conscious and the unconscious because the conscious resists what the unconscious seeks to express. To explain this, he developed three personality structures: id, ego, and superego. The id, the most primitive of the three, functions according to the pleasure principle: seek pleasure and avoid pain. The superego plays the critical and moralizing role, while the ego is the organized, realistic part that mediates between the desires of the id and the superego.

=== Theories of cognitive development ===
Jean Piaget, a Swiss theorist, posited that children learn by actively constructing knowledge through their interactions with their physical and social environments. He suggested that the adult's role in helping the child learn was to provide appropriate materials. In his interviews with children, which formed an empirical basis for his theories, he used a form of Socratic questioning to elicit their thinking. He argued that a principal source of development was through the child's inevitable generation of contradictions through their interactions with their physical and social worlds. The child's resolution of these contradictions led to more integrated and advanced forms of interaction, a developmental process that he called "equilibration."

Piaget argued that intellectual development occurs through a series of stages generated by the process of equilibration. Each stage consists of steps that the child must master before moving on to the next. He believed that these stages are not separate from one another, but rather that each stage builds on the previous one in a continuous learning process. He proposed four stages: sensorimotor, pre-operational, concrete operational, and formal operational. Though he did not believe these stages occurred at any given age, many studies have determined when these cognitive abilities should take place.

=== Stages of moral development ===
Piaget claimed that logic and morality develop through constructive stages. Expanding on Piaget's work, Lawrence Kohlberg determined that the process of moral development was principally concerned with justice, and that it continued throughout the individual's lifetime.

He proposed three levels of moral reasoning: pre-conventional, conventional, and post-conventional. Pre-conventional moral reasoning is typical of children and is characterized by reasoning based on the rewards and punishments associated with different courses of action. Conventional moral reasoning occurs during late childhood and early adolescence and is characterized by rule-based reasoning grounded in societal conventions. Lastly, post-conventional moral reasoning is a stage during which the individual sees society's rules and conventions as relative and subjective, rather than as authoritative.

Kohlberg used the Heinz Dilemma to apply to his stages of moral development. The Heinz Dilemma involves Heinz's wife dying from cancer and Heinz having the dilemma of saving his wife by stealing a drug. Preconventional morality, conventional morality, and post-conventional morality apply to Heinz's situation.

=== Stages of psychosocial development ===
German-American psychologist Erik Erikson and his collaborator and wife, Joan Erikson, posit eight stages of human development, influenced by biological, psychological, and social factors, throughout the lifespan. At each stage, the person must resolve a challenge or an existential dilemma. Successful resolution of the dilemma results in the person ingraining a positive virtue, but failure to resolve the fundamental challenge of that stage reinforces negative perceptions of the person or the world around them, preventing the person's personal development.

The first stage, "Trust vs. Mistrust", takes place in infancy. The positive virtue for the first stage is hope, in the infant learning who to trust and having hope for a supportive group of people to be there for them. The second stage is "Autonomy vs. Shame and Doubt" with the positive virtue being will. This takes place in early childhood, when the child learns to become more independent by discovering what they can do. If the child is overly controlled, feelings of inadequacy are reinforced, which can lead to low self-esteem and doubt.

The third stage is "Initiative vs. Guilt". The virtue gained is a sense of purpose. This takes place primarily via play. This is the stage when the child will be curious and engage in many interactions with other kids. They will ask many questions as their curiosity grows. If too much guilt is present, the child may have a slower, harder time interacting with their world and the other children in it.

The fourth stage is "Industry (competence) vs. Inferiority". The virtue of this stage is competence and results from the child's early experiences in school. This stage is when the child will try to win others' approval and understand the value of their accomplishments.

The fifth stage is "Identity vs. Role Confusion". The virtue gained is fidelity, and it takes place in adolescence. This is when the child ideally begins to identify their place in society, particularly regarding their gender role.

The sixth stage is "Intimacy vs. Isolation", which happens in young adults, and the virtue gained is love. This is when a person starts to share their life intimately and emotionally with someone else. Not doing so can reinforce feelings of isolation.

The seventh stage is "Generativity vs. Stagnation". This happens in adulthood, and the virtue gained is care. A person becomes stable and starts to give back by raising a family and becoming involved in the community.

The eighth stage is "Ego Integrity vs. Despair". When one grows old, they look back on their life and contemplate their successes and failures. If they resolve this positively, the virtue of wisdom is gained. This is also the stage when one can gain a sense of closure and accept death without regret or fear.

=== Stages based on the model of hierarchical complexity ===
Michael Commons enhanced and simplified Bärbel Inhelder and Piaget's developmental theory, and offers a standard method of examining the universal pattern of development. The Model of Hierarchical Complexity (MHC) is not based on the assessment of domain-specific information. It divides the Order of Hierarchical Complexity of tasks to be addressed from the Stage performance on those tasks. A stage is the order of hierarchical complexity of the tasks the participant successfully addresses. He expanded Piaget's original eight stages (counting the half-stages) to seventeen stages. The stages are:

1. Calculatory
2. Automatic
3. Sensory & Motor
4. Circular sensory-motor
5. Sensory-motor
6. Nominal
7. Sentential
8. Preoperational
9. Primary
10. Concrete
11. Abstract
12. Formal
13. Systematic
14. Metasystematic
15. Paradigmatic
16. Cross-paradigmatic
17. Meta-Cross-paradigmatic

The hierarchical complexity order of tasks predicts performance difficulty, with an R ranging from 0.9 to 0.98.

In the MHC there are three main axioms for an order to meet for the higher order task to coordinate the next lower order task. Axioms are rules used to determine how the MHC orders actions to form a hierarchy. These axioms are: a) defined in terms of tasks at the next lower order of hierarchical complexity task action; b) defined as the higher order task action that organizes two or more less complex actions; that is, the more complex action specifies the way in which the less complex actions combine; c) defined as the lower order task actions have to be carried out non-arbitrarily.Commons, Michael L.; Gane-McCalla, Rebecca; Barker, Christopher D.; Li, Ellen Y. (2014). "The model of hierarchical complexity as a measurement system". Behavioral Development Bulletin. 19 (3). American Psychological Association: 9–68. doi:10.1037/h0100589.

=== Ecological systems theory ===
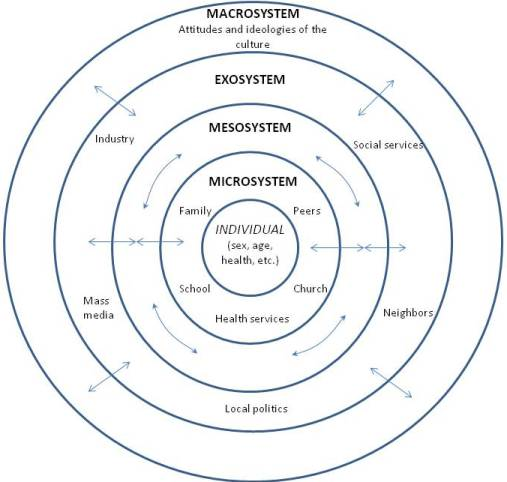
Bronfenbrenner's ecological systems theory

Ecological systems theory, originally formulated by Urie Bronfenbrenner, specifies four types of nested environmental systems, with bidirectional influences within and between them. The four systems are microsystem, mesosystem, exosystem, and macrosystem. Each system contains roles, norms, and rules that can powerfully shape development. The microsystem is the direct environment in our lives, such as our home and school. Mesosystem is how relationships connect to the microsystem. The exosystem is a larger social system in which the child plays no role. Macrosystem refers to the cultural values, customs, and laws of society.

The microsystem is the immediate environment surrounding and influencing the individual (e.g., school or home). The mesosystem is the combination of two microsystems and the ways they influence each other (e.g., sibling relationships at home vs. peer relationships at school). The exosystem is the interaction among two or more settings that are indirectly linked (for example, a father's job requiring more overtime influences his daughter's performance in school because he can no longer help with her homework). The macrosystem is broader, encompassing socioeconomic status, culture, beliefs, customs, and morals (for example, a child from a wealthier family may see a peer from a less wealthy family as inferior for that reason). Lastly, the chronosystem refers to the chronological nature of life events and how they interact and change the individual and their circumstances through transition (example: a mother losing her own mother to illness and no longer having that support in her life).

Since its publication in 1979 Bronfenbrenner's major statement of this theory, The Ecology of Human Development, has had widespread influence on the way psychologists and others approach the study of human beings and their environments. As a result of this conceptualization of development, these environments—from the family to economic and political structures—have come to be viewed as part of the life course from childhood through to adulthood.

=== Zone of proximal development ===
Lev Vygotsky was a Russian theorist from the Soviet era, who posited that children learn through hands-on experience and social interactions with members of their culture. Vygotsky believed that a child's development should be examined during problem-solving activities. Unlike Piaget, he claimed that timely and sensitive intervention by adults when a child is on the edge of learning a new task (called the "zone of proximal development") could help children learn new tasks.

The zone of proximal development is a concept used to explain children's learning and collaborative problem-solving with an adult or peer. This adult role is often referred to as the skilled "master", whereas the child is considered the learning apprentice through an educational process often termed "cognitive apprenticeship". Martin Hill stated that "The world of reality does not apply to the mind of a child." This technique is called "scaffolding" because it builds on children's existing knowledge, with adults helping them learn new knowledge.

Vygotsky was strongly focused on the role of culture in determining the child's pattern of development, arguing that development moves from the social level to the individual level. In other words, Vygotsky claimed that psychology should focus on the progress of human consciousness through the relationship of an individual and their environment. He felt that if scholars continued to disregard this connection, then this disregard would inhibit the full comprehension of the human consciousness.

=== Constructivism ===
Constructivism is a paradigm in psychology that characterizes learning as an active process of constructing knowledge. Individuals create meaning for themselves or make sense of new information by selecting, organizing, and integrating information with other knowledge, often in the context of social interactions. Constructivism can occur in two ways: individual and social. Individual constructivism is the view that a person constructs knowledge through cognitive processes based on their own experiences rather than by memorizing facts provided by others. Social constructivism is the view that individuals construct knowledge through interactions between the knowledge they bring to a situation and the social or cultural exchanges within that context. A foundational concept of constructivism is that the purpose of cognition is to organize one's experiential world, instead of the ontological world around them.

Jean Piaget, a Swiss developmental psychologist, proposed that learning is an active process because children learn through experience, make mistakes, and solve problems. Piaget proposed that learning should be holistic by helping students understand that meaning is constructed.

=== Evolutionary developmental psychology ===
Evolutionary developmental psychology is a research paradigm that applies the basic principles of Darwinian evolution, particularly natural selection, to understand the development of human behavior and cognition. It involves the study of both the genetic and environmental mechanisms that underlie the development of social and cognitive competencies, as well as the epigenetic (gene-environment interactions) processes that adapt these competencies to local conditions.

EDP considers both the reliably developing, species-typical features of ontogeny (developmental adaptations) and individual differences in behavior from an evolutionary perspective. While evolutionary views tend to regard most individual differences as the result of either random genetic noise (evolutionary byproducts) and/or idiosyncrasies (for example, peer groups, education, neighborhoods, and chance encounters) rather than products of natural selection, EDP asserts that natural selection can favor the emergence of individual differences via "adaptive developmental plasticity". From this perspective, human development follows alternative life-history strategies in response to environmental variability, rather than following one species-typical pattern of development.

EDP is closely linked to the theoretical framework of evolutionary psychology (EP), but is also distinct from EP in several domains, including research emphasis (EDP focuses on adaptations of ontogeny, as opposed to adaptations of adulthood) and consideration of proximate ontogenetic and environmental factors (i.e., how development happens) in addition to more ultimate factors (i.e., why development happens), which are the focus of mainstream evolutionary psychology.

=== Attachment theory ===
Attachment theory, originally developed by John Bowlby, focuses on the importance of open, intimate, emotionally meaningful relationships. Attachment is described as a biological system or powerful survival impulse that evolved to ensure the survival of the infant. A threatened or stressed child will move toward caregivers who provide a sense of physical, emotional, and psychological safety. Attachment feeds on body contact and familiarity. Psychologist Harry Harlow's research with infant rhesus monkeys in the mid-20th century provided pivotal experimental support for attachment theory. His studies found that infant monkeys consistently preferred cloth surrogate mothers that provided comfort over wire ones that offered only food. These results demonstrated that emotional security and physical comfort are more critical to attachment than nourishment alone. Harlow's findings reinforced Bowlby's view that early caregiving relationships are biologically essential for healthy emotional development and social bonding later in life.

Later, Mary Ainsworth developed the strange situation protocol and the concept of the secure base. This tool has been found to help understand attachment, such as the Strange Situation Test and the Adult Attachment Interview. Both of which help determine factors of certain attachment styles. The Strange Situation Test helps identify "disturbances in attachment" and whether specific attributes contribute to a particular attachment issue. The Adult Attachment Interview is a tool that is similar to the Strange Situation Test but instead focuses attachment issues found in adults. Both tests have helped many researchers gain more information on the risks and how to identify them.

Theorists have proposed four types of attachment styles: secure, anxious-avoidant, anxious-resistant, and disorganized. Secure attachment is a healthy attachment between the infant and the caregiver. It is characterized by trust. Anxious-avoidant is an insecure attachment between an infant and a caregiver. This is characterized by the infant's indifference toward the caregiver. Anxious-resistant is an insecure attachment between the infant and the caregiver, characterized by distress when separated and anger upon reunion. Disorganized is an attachment style without a consistent pattern of responses upon return of the parent.

It is possible to prevent a child's innate propensity to develop bonds. Some infants are kept in isolation or subjected to severe neglect or abuse, or they are raised without the stimulation and care of a regular caregiver. This deprivation may cause short-term consequences such as separation, rage, despair, and a brief lag in cerebral growth. Increased aggression, clinging behavior, alienation, psychosomatic illnesses, and an elevated risk of adult depression are among the long-term consequences.\

According to attachment theory, a psychological concept, people's capacity to develop healthy social and emotional ties later in life is greatly influenced by their early relationships with their primary caregivers, especially during infancy. This suggests that humans have an innate need to form strong bonds with caregivers to survive and remain healthy. Childhood attachment styles can have an impact on how people behave in adult social situations, including romantic partnerships.

=== Nature vs nurture ===
A significant concern of developmental psychology is the relationship between innateness and environmental influences on development. This is often referred to as "nature and nurture" or nativism versus empiricism. A nativist account of development would argue that the processes in question are innate, that is, they are specified by the organism's genes. What makes a person who they are? Is it their environment or their genetics? This is the debate of nature vs nurture.

According to an empiricist viewpoint, those processes are learned through interaction with the environment. Today, most developmental psychologists take a more holistic approach, emphasizing the interaction between genetic and environmental influences. One of the ways this relationship has been explored in recent years is through the emerging field of evolutionary developmental psychology.

The dispute over innateness has been well represented in the field of language acquisition studies. A major question in this area is whether or not certain properties of human language are specified genetically or can be acquired through learning. The empiricist position on language acquisition holds that language input provides the necessary information for learning language structure and that infants acquire language through a process of statistical learning. From this perspective, language can be acquired via general learning methods that also apply to other aspects of development, such as perceptual learning.

The nativist position argues that the input from language is too impoverished for infants and children to acquire the structure of language. Linguist Noam Chomsky asserts that, evidenced by the lack of sufficient information in the language input, there is a universal grammar that applies to all human languages and is pre-specified. This has led to the idea that there is a special cognitive module suited for learning language, often called the language acquisition device. Chomsky's critique of the behaviorist model of language acquisition is regarded by many as a key turning point in the decline in the prominence of the theory of behaviorism generally. But Skinner's conception of "Verbal Behavior" has not died, perhaps in part because it has generated successful practical applications.

Maybe there could be "strong interactions of both nature and nurture". Many researchers now emphasize that development results from a continuous, dynamic interaction between genetic predispositions and environmental influences. Rather than acting independently, nature and nurture are seen as intertwined forces, in which genetic factors can shape sensitivity to environmental inputs, and environmental conditions can influence gene expression throughout development.

=== Continuity vs discontinuity ===
One of the major discussions in developmental psychology includes whether development is discontinuous or continuous.

Continuous development is quantifiable, whereas discontinuous development is qualitative. Quantitative estimates of development can include measuring a child's stature, memory, or attention span. "Particularly dramatic examples of qualitative changes are metamorphoses, such as the emergence of a caterpillar into a butterfly."

Those psychologists who bolster the continuous view of improvement propose that improvement involves slow, progressive changes throughout life, with behavior in earlier stages of development laying the foundation for the abilities and capacities required for later stages. "To many, the concept of continuous, quantifiable measurement seems to be the essence of science".

However, not all psychologists concur that advancement could be a continuous process. A few see advancement as a discontinuous process. They accept that advancement comprises distinct stages, with different types of behavior occurring in each organization. This proposes that the development of certain capacities at each stage, such as particular feelings or ways of thinking, has definite beginning and end points. Nevertheless, there is no exact moment when a capacity suddenly appears or disappears. Although some sorts of considering, feeling, or carrying on may seem abrupt, it is more than likely that this has been developing gradually for some time.

Stage theories of development rest on the suspicion that development may be a discontinuous process, comprising distinct stages characterized by subjective contrasts in behavior. They moreover assume that the structure of the stages is not variable from person to person; in any case, the time of each stage may vary. Stage theories can be differentiated with ceaseless hypotheses, which state that development is an incremental process.

=== Stability vs change ===
This issue concerns the extent to which one becomes an older version of their earlier self or develops into something different from who they were at an earlier stage of development. It considers the extent to which early experiences (especially infancy) or later experiences are the key determinants of a person's development. Stability is defined as the consistent ordering of individual differences with respect to some attribute. Change is altering someone/something.

Most human development lifespan developmentalists recognize that extreme positions are unwise. Therefore, the key to a comprehensive understanding of development at any stage requires the interaction of different factors and not only one.

=== Theory of mind ===
Theory of mind is the ability to attribute mental states to ourselves and others. It is a complex but vital process in which children begin to understand the emotions, motives, and feelings of not only themselves but also others. Theory of mind allows individuals to understand that others have beliefs and desires that differ from their own. This ability enables successful social interactions by recognizing and interpreting others' mental states. If a child does not fully develop theory of mind within this crucial 5-year period, they can suffer from communication barriers that follow them into adolescence and adulthood. Exposure to more people and the availability of stimuli that encourage social-cognitive growth is a factor that relies heavily on family.

== Mathematical models ==
Developmental psychology is concerned not only with describing the characteristics of psychological change over time but also with explaining the principles and internal workings underlying these changes. Psychologists have attempted to better understand these factors by using models. A model must account for the means by which a process takes place. This is sometimes done in reference to changes in the brain that may correspond to changes in behavior over the course of development.

Mathematical modeling is useful in developmental psychology for implementing theory in a precise and easy-to-study manner, allowing generation, explanation, integration, and prediction of diverse phenomena. Several modeling techniques are applied to development: symbolic, connectionist (neural network), or dynamical systems models.

Dynamic systems models illustrate how many different features of a complex system may interact to yield emergent behaviors and abilities. Nonlinear dynamics has been applied to human systems specifically to address issues that require attention to temporality, such as life transitions, human development, and behavioral or emotional change over time. Nonlinear dynamic systems is currently being explored as a way to explain discrete phenomena of human development such as affect, second language acquisition, and locomotion.

== Research areas ==
=== Neural development ===
One critical aspect of developmental psychology is the study of neural development, which examines how the brain changes across the lifespan. Neural development focuses on how the brain changes and develops during different stages of life. Studies have shown that the human brain undergoes rapid changes during the prenatal and early postnatal periods. These changes include the formation of neurons, the development of neural networks, and the establishment of synaptic connections. The formation of neurons and the establishment of basic neural circuits in the developing brain are crucial for laying the foundation of the brain's structure and function, and disruptions during this period can have long-term effects on cognitive and emotional development.

Experiences and environmental factors play a crucial role in shaping neural development. Early sensory experiences, such as exposure to language and visual stimuli, can influence the development of neural pathways related to perception and language processing.

Genetic factors play a huge role in neural development. Genetic factors can influence the timing and pattern of neural development, as well as the susceptibility to certain developmental disorders, such as autism spectrum disorder and attention-deficit/hyperactivity disorder.

Research finds that the adolescent brain undergoes significant changes in neural connectivity and plasticity. During this period, a pruning process occurs in which certain neural connections are strengthened while others are eliminated, resulting in more efficient neural networks and increased cognitive abilities, such as decision-making and impulse control.

The study of neural development provides crucial insights into the complex interplay between genetics, environment, and experiences in shaping the developing brain. By understanding the neural processes underlying developmental changes, researchers gain a clearer picture of human cognitive, emotional, and social development.

=== Cognitive development ===
Cognitive development is primarily concerned with how infants and children acquire, develop, and use internal mental capabilities such as problem-solving, memory, and language. Major topics in cognitive development include language acquisition and the development of perceptual and motor skills. Piaget was one of the influential early psychologists to study the development of cognitive abilities. His theory suggests that development proceeds through a set of stages from infancy to adulthood, with an endpoint or goal.

Other accounts, such as that of Lev Vygotsky, have suggested that development does not progress through stages, but rather that the developmental process, which begins at birth and continues until death, is too complex for such structure and finality. Rather, from this viewpoint, developmental processes proceed more continuously. Thus, development should be analyzed rather than treated as a product to obtain.

K. Warner Schaie has expanded the study of cognitive development into adulthood. Rather than being stable from adolescence, Schaie sees adults as progressing in the application of their cognitive abilities.

Modern cognitive development has integrated the considerations of cognitive psychology and the psychology of individual differences into the interpretation and modeling of development. Specifically, the neo-Piagetian theories of cognitive development showed that the successive levels or stages of cognitive development are associated with increasing processing efficiency and working memory capacity. These increases explain differences between stages, progression to higher stages, and individual differences among children who are the same age and grade level. However, other theories have moved away from Piagetian stage theories. They are influenced by accounts of domain-specific information processing, which posit that development is guided by innate, evolutionarily specified, and content-specific information-processing mechanisms.

=== Social and emotional development ===
Developmental psychologists who are interested in social development examine how individuals develop social and emotional competencies. For example, they study how children form friendships, how they understand and deal with emotions, and how identity develops. Research in this area may involve studying the relationship between cognition, cognitive development, and social behavior.

Emotional regulation (ER) refers to an individual's ability to modulate emotional responses across a variety of contexts. In young children, this modulation is in part controlled externally by parents and other authority figures. As children develop, they take on increasing responsibility for their internal state. Studies have shown that the development of ER is affected by the emotional regulation children observe in their parents and caregivers, the emotional climate at home, and the reactions of parents and caregivers to the child's emotions.

Music also influences stimulating and enhancing the senses of a child through self-expression.

A child's social and emotional development can be disrupted by motor coordination problems, as evidenced by the environmental stress hypothesis. The environmental hypothesis explains how children with coordination problems and developmental coordination disorder are exposed to several psychosocial consequences which act as secondary stressors, leading to an increase in internalizing symptoms such as depression and anxiety. Motor coordination problems affect fine and gross motor movement as well as perceptual-motor skills. Secondary stressors commonly identified include the tendency for children with poor motor skills to be less likely to participate in organized play with other children and more likely to feel socially isolated.

Social and emotional development focuses on five key areas: Self-Awareness, Self-Management, Social Awareness, Relationship Skills, and Responsible Decision Making.

=== Physical development ===
Physical development concerns the physical maturation of an individual's body until it reaches adult stature. Although physical growth is a highly regular process, all children differ tremendously in the timing of their growth spurts. Studies are being done to analyze how the differences in these timings affect and are related to other variables of developmental psychology such as information processing speed. Traditional measures of physical maturity using X-rays are less commonly used nowadays than simple measurements of body parts such as height, weight, head circumference, and arm span.

A few other studies and practices in physical developmental psychology include research on the phonological abilities of mature 5- to 11-year-olds and the controversial hypotheses that left-handers are maturationally delayed compared to right-handers. A study by Eaton, Chipperfield, Ritchot, and Kostiuk in 1996 found in three different samples that there was no difference between right- and left-handers.

=== Memory development ===
Researchers interested in memory development examine how our memory develops from childhood onward. According to fuzzy-trace theory, a theory of cognition originally proposed by Valerie F. Reyna and Charles Brainerd, people have two separate memory processes: verbatim and gist. These two traces begin to develop at different times and at different paces. Children as young as four years old have verbatim memory, memory for surface information, which increases up to early adulthood, at which point it begins to decline. On the other hand, our capacity for gist memory, memory for semantic information, increases through early adulthood, after which it remains stable through old age. Furthermore, reliance on gist memory traces increases with age. Neuroscientific research has contributed to understanding the biological mechanisms behind memory development. A study using diffusion MRI in children aged 4 to 12 found that greater maturity of white matter tracts, specifically the uncinate fasciculus and dorsal cingulum bundle, was associated with stronger episodic memory recall. These findings suggest that the structural development of white matter pathways plays a significant role in memory function during childhood.

== Research methods and designs ==
=== Main research methods ===
Developmental psychology employs many of the research methods used in other areas of psychology. However, infants and children cannot be tested in the same ways as adults, so different methods are often used to study their development.

Developmental psychologists have many methods to study changes in individuals over time. Common research methods include systematic observation, such as naturalistic observation or structured observation; self-reports, such as clinical interviews or structured interviews; the clinical or case study method; and ethnography or participant observation. These methods differ in the extent of control researchers impose on study conditions, and how they construct ideas about which variables to study. Every developmental investigation can be characterized in terms of whether its underlying strategy involves the experimental, correlational, or case study approach. The experimental method involves "actual manipulation of various treatments, circumstances, or events to which the participant or subject is exposed; the experimental design points to cause-and-effect relationships. This method allows for strong inferences to be made of causal relationships between the manipulation of one or more independent variables and subsequent behavior, as measured by the dependent variable. The advantage of using this research method is that it permits the determination of cause-and-effect relationships among variables. On the other hand, the limitation is that data obtained in an artificial environment may lack generalizability. The correlational method explores the relationship between two or more events by gathering information about these variables without researcher intervention. The advantage of using a correlational design is that it estimates the strength and direction of relationships among variables in the natural environment; but the limitation is that it does not permit the determination of cause-and-effect relationships among variables. The case study approach allows investigations to obtain an in-depth understanding of an individual participant by collecting data based on interviews, structured questionnaires, observations, and test scores. Each of these methods has its strengths and weaknesses, but the experimental method, when appropriate, is the preferred method of developmental scientists because it provides a controlled situation and conclusions to be drawn about cause-and-effect relationships.

=== Research designs ===
Most developmental studies, regardless of whether they employ the experimental, correlational, or case study method, can also be constructed using research designs. Research designs are logical frameworks used to make key comparisons within research studies, such as:

- cross-sectional design
- longitudinal design
- sequential design
- microgenetic design

In a longitudinal study a researcher observes many individuals born at or around the same time (a cohort) and conducts follow-up observations as the cohort ages. This method can be used to draw conclusions about which types of development are universal (or normative) and occur in most members of a cohort. As an example a longitudinal study of early literacy development examined in detail the early literacy experiences of one child in each of 30 families.

Researchers may also observe how development varies among individuals and hypothesize about the causes of variation in their data. Longitudinal studies often require substantial time and funding, making them infeasible in some situations. Also, because members of a cohort all experience historical events unique to their generation, apparently normative developmental trends may, in fact, be universal only to their cohort.

In a cross-sectional study a researcher observes differences among individuals of different ages at a single point in time. This generally requires fewer resources than the longitudinal method, and because the individuals come from different cohorts, shared historical events are less of a confounding factor. By the same token, however, cross-sectional research may not be the most effective way to study differences between participants, as these differences may result not from their different ages but from their exposure to different historical events.

A third study design, the sequential design, combines both methodologies. Here, a researcher observes members of different birth cohorts at the same time, and then tracks all participants over time, charting changes in the groups. While much more resource-intensive, the format helps clarify the distinction between changes attributable to an individual or historical environment and those that are truly universal.

Because every method has some weaknesses, developmental psychologists rarely rely on a single study or even a single method; instead, they seek consistent evidence from as many converging sources as possible.

== Life stages of psychological development ==
=== Prenatal development ===
Prenatal development is of interest to psychologists investigating the context of early psychological development. Prenatal development involves three main stages: the germinal stage, the embryonic stage, and the fetal stage. The germinal stage begins at conception and lasts until 2 weeks; the embryonic stage is the development from 2 weeks to 8 weeks; the fetal stage is from 9 weeks until birth. The senses develop in the womb itself: a fetus can both see and hear by the second trimester (13 to 24 weeks of age). The sense of touch develops in the embryonic stage (5 to 8 weeks). Most of the brain's billions of neurons are also developed by the second trimester. Babies are hence born with some odor, taste, and sound preferences, largely related to the mother's environment.

Some primitive reflexes also arise before birth and remain present in newborns. One hypothesis is that these reflexes are vestigial and have limited use in early human life. Piaget's theory of cognitive development suggested that some early reflexes are building blocks for infant sensorimotor development. For example, the tonic neck reflex may help development by bringing objects into the infant's field of view.

Other reflexes, such as the walking reflex, appear to be replaced by more sophisticated voluntary control later in infancy. This may be because the infant gains too much weight after birth to be strong enough to use the reflex, or because the reflex and subsequent development are functionally different. It has also been suggested that some reflexes (for example the moro and walking reflexes) are predominantly adaptations to life in the womb with little connection to early infant development. Primitive reflexes reappear in adults under certain conditions, such as neurological conditions like dementia or traumatic lesions.

Ultrasounds have shown that infants are capable of a range of movements in the womb, many of which appear to be more than simple reflexes. By the time they are born, infants can recognize and have a preference for their mother's voice, suggesting some prenatal development of auditory perception. Prenatal development and birth complications may also be connected to neurodevelopmental disorders, for example, in schizophrenia. With the advent of cognitive neuroscience, embryology, and the neuroscience of prenatal development, these areas have become of increasing interest to developmental psychology research.

Theoretical extensions in the field now investigate "embryonic spiritual life". While debated, these theories cite fetal sensory capacities to suggest that prenatal experiences may influence the development of later spiritual representations and self-transcendence.

Several environmental agents—teratogens—can cause damage during the prenatal period. These include prescription and nonprescription drugs, illegal drugs, tobacco, alcohol, environmental pollutants, infectious disease agents such as the rubella virus and the toxoplasmosis parasite, maternal malnutrition, maternal emotional stress, and Rh factor blood incompatibility between mother and child. Many statistics prove the effects of the aforementioned substances. A leading example of this would be that at least 100,000 "cocaine babies" were born in the United States annually in the late 1980s. "Cocaine babies" are proven to have quite severe and lasting difficulties that persist throughout infancy and right throughout childhood. The drug also encourages behavioral problems in the affected children and defects of various vital organs.

=== Infancy ===
From birth until the first year, children are referred to as infants. As they grow, children respond to their environment in unique ways. Developmental psychologists vary widely in their assessment of infant psychology, and the influence the outside world has upon it.

The majority of a newborn infant's time is spent sleeping. At first, their sleep cycles are evenly spread throughout the day and night, but after a couple of months, infants generally become diurnal. In human or rodent infants, there is always the observation of a diurnal cortisol rhythm, which is sometimes entrained with a maternal substance. Nevertheless, the circadian rhythm starts to take shape; a 24-hour rhythm is observed in just some few months after birth.

Infants can be seen to have six states, grouped into pairs:

- quiet sleep and active sleep (dreaming, when REM sleep occurs). Generally, there are various reasons as to why infants dream. Some argue that it is just a psychotherapy, which usually occurs normally in the brain. Dreaming is a form of processing and consolidating information acquired during the day. Freud argues that dreams are a way of representing unconscious desires.
- quiet waking, and active waking
- fussing and crying. In a normal setup, infants cry for different reasons. Mostly, infants cry due to physical discomfort, hunger, or to receive attention or stimulation from their caregiver.

==== Infant perception ====
Infant perception is what a newborn can see, hear, smell, taste, and touch. These five features are considered the "five senses". Because of these different senses, infants respond to stimuli differently.

- Vision is significantly worse in infants than in older children. An infant's vision tends to be blurry in the early stages but improves over time. Color perception, similar to that seen in adults, has been demonstrated in infants as young as four months using habituation methods. Infants attain adult-like vision at about six months.
- Hearing is well-developed before birth. Newborns prefer complex sounds to pure tones, human speech to other sounds, their mother's voice to other voices, and their native language to other languages. Scientists believe these features are probably learned in the womb. Infants are fairly good at detecting the direction a sound comes from, and by 18 months, their hearing ability is approximately equal to an adult's.
- Smell and taste are present, with infants showing different expressions of disgust or pleasure when presented with pleasant odors (honey, milk, etc.) or unpleasant odors (rotten egg) and tastes (e.g., sour taste). Newborns are born with odor and taste preferences acquired in the womb from the amniotic fluid, which, in turn, is influenced by what the mother eats. Both breast- and bottle-fed babies around three days old prefer the smell of human milk to that of formula, indicating an innate preference. Older infants also prefer the smell of their mother to that of others.
- Touch and feel is one of the better-developed senses at birth, as it is one of the first senses to develop inside the womb. This is evidenced by the primitive reflexes described above, and the relatively advanced development of the somatosensory cortex.
- Pain: Infants feel pain similarly, if not more strongly than older children, but pain relief in infants has not received as much attention as an area of research. Glucose is known to relieve pain in newborns.

==== Language ====
Babies are born with the ability to discriminate virtually all sounds of all human languages. Infants of around six months can differentiate between phonemes in their own language, but not between similar phonemes in another language. Notably, infants can distinguish between different durations and sound levels and readily differentiate among the languages they have encountered, making it easier for them to understand a given language than for adults to do so.

At this stage, infants also start to babble, making vowel-consonant sounds as they try to understand the true meaning of language and copy what they hear in their surroundings, producing their own phonemes.

In various cultures, a distinct form of speech called "babytalk" is used when communicating with newborns and young children. This register consists of simplified terms for common topics such as family members, food, hygiene, and familiar animals. It also exhibits specific phonological patterns, such as substituting initial velar sounds for alveolar sounds, especially in languages like English. Furthermore, babytalk often involves morphological simplifications, such as regularizing verb conjugations (for instance, saying "corned" instead of "cornered" or "goed" instead of "went"). This language is typically taught to children and is perceived as their natural way of communication. Interestingly, in mythology and popular culture, certain characters, such as the "Hausa trickster" or the Warner Bros cartoon character "Tweety Pie", are portrayed as speaking in a babytalk-like manner.

=== Infant cognition: the Piagetian era ===
Piaget suggested that an infant's perception and understanding of the world depended on their motor development, which was required for the infant to link visual, tactile, and motor representations of objects. The concept of object permanence refers to the knowledge that an object exists even when it is not directly perceived or visible; in other words, something is still there even if it is not visible. This is a crucial developmental milestone for infants, who learn that something is not necessarily lost forever just because it is hidden. When a child displays object permanence, they will look for a hidden toy, showing that they are aware the item is still there even when covered by a blanket. Most babies begin to exhibit signs of object permanence around 8 months of age. According to this theory, infants develop object permanence through touching and handling objects.

Piaget's sensorimotor stage comprised six sub-stages (see sensorimotor stages for more detail). In the early stages, development arises out of movements caused by primitive reflexes. Discovery of new behaviors results from classical and operant conditioning, and the formation of habits. From eight months the infant can uncover a hidden object but will persevere when the object is moved.

Piaget concluded that infants lacked object permanence before 18 months, as they failed to look for an object where it had last been seen. Instead, infants continued to look for an object where it was first seen, committing the "A-not-B error". Some researchers have suggested that before the age of 8–9 months, infants' inability to understand object permanence extends to people as well, which explains why infants at this age do not cry when their mothers are out of sight ("Out of sight, out of mind").

==== Recent findings in infant cognition ====
In the 1980s and 1990s, researchers developed new methods for assessing infants' understanding of the world with far more precision and subtlety than Piaget could achieve in his time. Since then, many studies using these methods suggest that young infants understand far more about the world than was once thought.

Based on recent findings, some researchers (such as Elizabeth Spelke and Renee Baillargeon) have proposed that an understanding of object permanence is not learned at all, but rather comprises part of the innate cognitive capacities of our species.

According to Jean Piaget's developmental psychology, object permanence, or the awareness that objects exist even when they are no longer visible, was thought to emerge gradually between the ages of 8 and 12 months. However, experts such as Elizabeth Spelke and Renee Baillargeon have questioned this notion. They studied infants' comprehension of object permanence at a young age using novel experimental approaches such as violation-of-expectation paradigms. These findings imply that children as young as 3 to 4 months old may have an innate awareness of object permanence. Baillargeon's "drawbridge" experiment, for example, showed that infants were surprised when they observed events that contradicted expectations about object permanence. This proposition has important consequences for our understanding of infant cognition, implying that infants may be born with core cognitive abilities rather than developing them via experience and learning.

Other research has suggested that young infants in their first six months of life may possess an understanding of numerous aspects of the world around them, including:

- an early numerical cognition, that is, an ability to represent number and even compute the outcomes of addition and subtraction operations;
- an ability to infer the goals of people in their environment;
- an ability to engage in simple causal reasoning.

=== Critical periods of development ===
There are critical periods in infancy and childhood during which the development of certain perceptual, sensorimotor, social, and language systems depends crucially on environmental stimulation. Feral children such as Genie, deprived of adequate stimulation, fail to acquire important skills and are unable to learn in later childhood. In this case, Genie is used to represent the case of a feral child because she was socially neglected and abused while she was just a young girl. She underwent abnormal child development, which involved problems with her linguistics. This happened because she was neglected while she was very young, with no one to care about her, and had less human contact.

The concept of critical periods is also well established in neurophysiology, as demonstrated by the work of Hubel and Wiesel, among others. Neurophysiology in infants generally provides correlating details that exist between neurophysiological details and clinical features, and also focuses on vital information on rare and common neurological disorders that affect infants.

==== Developmental delays ====
Studies have examined differences between children with developmental delays and those with typical development. Normally, when comparing one another, mental age (MA) is not taken into consideration. There still may be differences in developmentally delayed (DD) children vs. typical development (TD) behavioral, emotional, and other mental disorders. Compared with MA children, there is a greater difference in overall normal developmental behaviors. DDs can cause lower MA, so comparing DDs with TDs may not be as accurate. Pairing DDs specifically with TD children at similar MA can be more accurate. There are levels of behavioral differences that are considered normal at certain ages. When evaluating DDs and MA in children, consider whether those with DDs have a larger amount of behavior that is not typical for their MA group. Developmental delays tend to contribute to other disorders or difficulties than their TD counterparts.

=== Toddlerhood ===
Infants shift between the ages of one and two to a developmental stage known as toddlerhood. In this stage, an infant's transition into toddlerhood is marked by self-awareness, linguistic development, and the emergence of memory and imagination.

During toddlerhood, babies begin learning how to walk, talk, and make decisions for themselves. An important characteristic of this age period is the development of language, where children are learning how to communicate and express their emotions and desires through the use of vocal sounds, babbling, and eventually words. Self-control also begins to develop. At this age, children take the initiative to explore, experiment, and learn from making mistakes. Caretakers who encourage toddlers to try new things and test their limits, help the child become autonomous, self-reliant, and confident. If the caretaker is overprotective or disapproving of independent actions, the toddler may begin to doubt their abilities and feel ashamed of the desire for independence. The child's autonomic development is inhibited, leaving them less prepared to deal with the world in the future. Toddlers also begin to identify with gender roles, acting according to their perception of what a man or woman should do.

Socially, the period of toddler-hood is commonly called the "terrible twos". Toddlers often use their new-found language abilities to voice their desires, but are often misunderstood by parents due to their language skills just beginning to develop. A person at this stage, testing their independence, is another reason behind the stage's infamous label. Tantrums in a fit of frustration are also common.

=== Childhood ===
Erik Erikson divides childhood into four stages, each with its distinct social crisis:

- Stage 1: Infancy (0 to 1½) in which the psychosocial crisis is Trust vs. Mistrust
- Stage 2: Early childhood (2½ to 3), in which the psychosocial crisis is Autonomy vs. Shame and doubt
- Stage 3: Play age (3 to 5) in which the psychosocial crisis is Initiative vs. Guilt. (This stage is also called the "pre-school age", "exploratory age", and "toy age".)
- Stage 4: School age (5 to 12), in which the psychosocial crisis is Industry vs. Inferiority

==== Infancy ====
As stated, Erikson's psychosocial crisis is Trust versus Mistrust. Needs are the foundation for gaining or losing trust in the infant. If the needs are met, trust in the guardian and the world forms. If the needs are not met or the infant is neglected, mistrust forms alongside feelings of anxiety and fear.

==== Early Childhood ====
Autonomy versus shame follows trust in infancy. The child begins to explore their world at this stage and develops preferences. If autonomy is allowed, the child grows in independence and their abilities. If freedom of exploration is hindered, it leads to feelings of shame and low self-esteem.

==== Play (or preschool) ages 3–5 ====
In the earliest years, children are "completely dependent on the care of others". Therefore, they develop a "social relationship" with their caregivers and, later, with family members. During their preschool years (3–5), they "enlarge their social horizons" to include people outside the family.

Preoperational and then operational thinking develops, which means actions are reversible, and egocentric thought diminishes.

Preschoolers' motor skills improve, allowing them to do more things for themselves. They become more independent. No longer completely dependent on others' care, this age group's world expands. More people have a role in shaping their individual personalities. Preschoolers explore and question their world. For Jean Piaget, the child is "a little scientist exploring and reflecting on these explorations to increase competence" and this is done in "a very independent way".

Play is a major activity for ages 3–5. For Piaget, through play, "a child reaches higher levels of cognitive development."

In their expanded world, children in the 3–5 age group attempt to find their own way. If this is done in a socially acceptable way, the child develops initiative. If not, the child develops guilt. Children who develop "guilt" rather than "initiative" have failed Erikson's psychosocial crisis for the 3–5 age group.

==== Middle and Late childhood ages 6–12 ====
According to Erik Erikson, the psychosocial crisis during middle childhood is Industry vs. Inferiority, which, if successfully met, instills a sense of Competence in the child.

In all cultures, middle childhood is a time for developing "skills that will be needed in their society." School offers an arena in which children can gain a view of themselves as "industrious (and worthy)". They are "graded for their school work and often for their industry". They can also develop industry outside of school in sports, games, and volunteer work. Children who achieve "success in school or games might develop a feeling of competence."

The "peril during this period is that feelings of inadequacy and inferiority will develop. Parents and teachers can "undermine" a child's development by failing to recognize accomplishments or being overly critical of a child's efforts. Children who are "encouraged and praised" develop a belief in their competence. Lack of encouragement or ability to excel lead to "feelings of inadequacy and inferiority".

The Centers for Disease Control (CDC) divides Middle Childhood into two stages, 6–8 years and 9–11 years, and gives "developmental milestones for each stage".

==== Middle Childhood (6–8) ====
Entering elementary school, children in this age group begin to think about the future and their "place in the world". Working with other students and wanting their friendship and acceptance becomes more important. This leads to "more independence from parents and family". As students, they develop the mental and verbal skills "to describe experiences and talk about thoughts and feelings". They become less self-centered and show "more concern for others".

==== Late Childhood (9–12) ====
For children ages 9–11 "friendships and peer relationships" increase in strength, complexity, and importance. This results in greater "peer pressure". They grow even less dependent on their families, and they are challenged academically. To meet this challenge, they increase their attention span and learn to see other points of view.

=== Adolescence ===
Adolescence is the period of life between the onset of puberty and the full commitment to an adult social role, such as worker, parent, and/or citizen. It is the period known for the formation of personal and social identity (see Erik Erikson) and the discovery of moral purpose (see William Damon). Intelligence is demonstrated through the logical use of symbols to represent abstract concepts and to support formal reasoning. A return to egocentric thought often occurs early in the period. Only 35% develop the capacity to reason formally during adolescence or adulthood. (Huitt, W., and Hummel, J., January 1998)

Erik Erikson labels this stage identity versus role confusion. Erikson emphasizes the importance of developing a sense of identity in adolescence because it affects the individual throughout their life. Identity is a lifelong process, shaped by curiosity and active engagement. Role confusion is often considered the current state of an individual's identity. Identity exploration is the process of changing from role confusion to resolution.

During Erik Erikson's identity versus role uncertainty stage, which occurs in adolescence, people struggle to form a cohesive sense of self while exploring many social roles and prospective life routes. This time is characterized by deep introspection, self-examination, and the pursuit of self-understanding. Adolescents are confronted with questions regarding their identity, beliefs, and future goals. The major problem is building a strong sense of identity in the face of society standards, peer pressure, and personal preferences. Adolescents engage in identity exploration, commitment, and synthesis, actively seeking new experiences, embracing ideals and aspirations, and integrating their evolving sense of self into a coherent identity. Successfully navigating this stage builds the groundwork for good psychological development in adulthood, allowing people to pursue meaningful relationships, make positive contributions to society, and handle life's adversities with perseverance and purpose.

It is divided into three parts, namely:

1. Early Adolescence: 9 to 13 years
2. Mid Adolescence: 13 to 15 years and
3. Late Adolescence: 15 to 18 years

The adolescent unconsciously explores questions such as "Who am I? Who do I want to be?" Like toddlers, adolescents must explore, test limits, become autonomous, and commit to an identity, or sense of self. Different roles, behaviors, and ideologies must be tried out to select an identity. Role confusion and inability to choose a vocation can result from a failure to achieve a sense of identity through, for example, friends.

=== Early adulthood ===
Early adulthood generally refers to the period between ages 18 and 39, and according to theorists such as Erik Erikson, is a stage where development is mainly focused on maintaining relationships. Erikson shows the importance of relationships by labeling this stage intimacy vs isolation. Intimacy suggests a process of becoming part of something larger than oneself through sacrifice in romantic relationships and by working toward both life and career goals. Other examples include creating bonds of intimacy, sustaining friendships, and starting a family. Some theorists argue that the development of intimacy skills depends on the resolution of earlier developmental stages. A sense of identity gained in the previous stages is also necessary for intimacy to develop. If this skill is not learned, the alternative is alienation, isolation, a fear of commitment, and the inability to depend on others.

Isolation, on the other hand, suggests something different from what most may expect. Erikson defined it as a delay in commitment to maintain freedom. Yet this decision does not come without consequences. Erikson explained that choosing isolation may affect one's chances of getting married, progressing in a career, and overall development.

A related framework for studying this stage of the lifespan is emerging adulthood. Scholars of emerging adulthood, such as Jeffrey Arnett, are not necessarily interested in relationship development. Instead, this concept suggests that people transition after their teenage years into a period, not characterized as relationship building and an overall sense of constancy with life, but with years of living with parents, phases of self-discovery, and experimentation.

=== Middle adulthood ===
Middle adulthood generally refers to the period between ages 40 and 64. During this period, middle-aged adults experience a conflict between generativity and stagnation. Generativity is the sense of contributing to society, the next generation, or one's immediate community. On the other hand, stagnation results in a lack of purpose. The adult's identity continues to develop in middle-adulthood. Middle-aged adults often adopt opposite gender characteristics. The adult realizes they are halfway through their life and often reevaluates vocational and social roles. Life circumstances can also cause a reexamination of identity.

Physically, middle-aged individuals experience declines in muscular strength, reaction time, sensory acuity, and cardiac output. Also, women experience menopause at an average age of 48.8 and a sharp drop in the hormone estrogen. Men experience an equivalent endocrine system event to menopause. Andropause in males is a hormone fluctuation with physical and psychological effects that can be similar to those seen in menopausal females. As men age, lowered testosterone levels can contribute to mood swings and a decline in sperm count. Sexual responsiveness can also be affected, including delays in erection and longer periods of penile stimulation required to achieve ejaculation.

The important influence of biological and social changes experienced by women and men in middle adulthood is reflected in the fact that depression is highest at age 48.5 around the world.

=== Old age ===
The World Health Organization finds "no general agreement on the age at which a person becomes old." Most "developed countries" set the age as 65 or 70. However, in developing countries, the inability to make an "active contribution" to society, rather than chronological age, marks the beginning of old age. According to Erikson's stages of psychosocial development, old age is the stage in which individuals assess the quality of their lives.

Erikson labels this stage as integrity versus despair. For integrated persons, there is a sense of fulfillment in life. They have become self-aware and optimistic through life's commitments and connections with others. While reflecting on life, people at this stage develop a sense of contentment with their experiences. If a person falls into despair, they are often disappointed about failures or missed chances in life. They may feel that the time left in life is an insufficient amount to turn things around.

Physically, older people experience a decline in muscular strength, reaction time, stamina, hearing, distance perception, and the sense of smell. They also are more susceptible to diseases such as cancer and pneumonia due to a weakened immune system. Programs aimed at balance, muscle strength, and mobility have been shown to reduce disability among mildly (but not more severely) disabled elderly.

Sexual expression depends in large part upon the emotional and physical health of the individual. Many older adults continue to be sexually active and satisfied with their sexual activity.

Mental disintegration may also occur, leading to dementia or ailments such as Alzheimer's disease. The average age of onset for dementia in males is 78.8 and 81.9 for women. It is generally believed that crystallized intelligence increases up to old age, while fluid intelligence decreases with age. Whether or not normal intelligence increases or decreases with age depends on the measure and study. Longitudinal studies show that perceptual speed, inductive reasoning, and spatial orientation decline. An article on adult cognitive development reports that cross-sectional studies show that "some abilities remained stable into early old age".

== Parenting ==
Parenting variables alone have typically accounted for 20 to 50 percent of the variance in child outcomes.

All parents have their own parenting styles. Parenting styles, according to Kimberly Kopko, are "based upon two aspects of parenting behavior: control and warmth. Parental control refers to the degree to which parents manage their children's behavior. Parental warmth refers to the degree to which parents are accepting and responsive to their children's behavior."

=== Parenting styles ===
The following parenting styles have been described in the child development literature:

- Authoritative parenting is characterized by parents who have high parental warmth, responsiveness, and demandingness, but rate low in negativity and conflict. These parents are assertive but not intrusive or overly restrictive. This method of parenting is associated with more positive social and academic outcomes. The beneficial outcomes of authoritative parenting are not necessarily universal. Among African American adolescents, authoritative parenting is not associated with academic achievement in the absence of peer support for achievement. Children who authoritative parents raise are "more likely to become independent, self-reliant, socially accepted, academically successful, and well-behaved. They are less likely to report depression and anxiety, and less likely to engage in antisocial behavior like delinquency and drug use."
- Authoritarian parenting is characterized by low levels of warmth and responsiveness with high levels of demandingness and firm control. These parents focus on obedience, and they monitor their children regularly. In general, this style of parenting is associated with maladaptive outcomes. The outcomes are more harmful for middle-class boys than girls, preschool white girls than preschool black girls, and for white boys than Hispanic boys.
- Permissive parenting is characterized by high levels of responsiveness combined with low levels of demandingness. These parents are lenient and do not necessarily require mature behavior. They allow for a high degree of self-regulation and typically avoid confrontation. Compared to children raised using the authoritative style, preschool girls raised in permissive families are less assertive. Additionally, preschool children of both sexes are less cognitively competent than those children raised under authoritative parenting styles. A subtype of this style, known as indulgent parenting, includes patterns of excessive emotional and behavioral leniency. Adolescents raised by highly indulgent parents have been found to report lower self-worth and higher levels of depression, suggesting that this form of permissive parenting may contribute to negative psychological outcomes.
- Rejecting or neglectful parenting is characterized by low levels of demandingness and responsiveness. These parents are usually unsupportive, unstructured, and uninterested in their children's lives. Low degrees of reactivity and demandingness are characteristics of this parenting style. Children in this category are typically the least competent of all the categories.

=== Mother and father factors ===
Parenting research has traditionally focused on mothers, but recent studies highlight the important role of fathers in child development. Children as young as 15 months benefit significantly from substantial engagement with their father. In particular, a study in the U.S. and New Zealand found the presence of the natural father was the most significant factor in reducing rates of early sexual activity and rates of teenage pregnancy in girls. However, neither a mother nor a father is actually essential in successful parenting, and both single parents as well as homosexual couples can support positive child outcomes. Children need at least one consistently responsible adult with whom they can form a positive emotional bond. Having multiple such figures further increases the likelihood of positive outcomes. Recent research also suggests that the way parents interact with infants can influence early brain development. Parents who guide their baby's attention during play by shifting their gaze between a toy and the child tend to have infants with more complex brain activity. This attention-guiding behavior helps infants process social cues more effectively.

=== Divorce ===
Another parental factor often debated in terms of its effects on child development is divorce. Divorce in itself is not a determining factor of negative child outcomes. In fact, the majority of children from divorcing families fall into the normal range on measures of psychological and cognitive functioning. Many mediating factors play a role in determining the effects divorce has on a child, for example, divorcing families with young children often face harsher consequences in terms of demographic, social, and economic changes than do families with older children. Positive coparenting after divorce is part of a pattern associated with positive child coping, while hostile parenting behaviors lead to a destructive pattern, leaving children at risk. Additionally, a direct parental relationship with the child also affects the development of a child after a divorce. Overall, protective factors that facilitate positive child development after a divorce include maternal warmth, a positive father-child relationship, and parental cooperation.

== Cross-cultural ==
A way to improve developmental psychology is through cross-cultural studies. The field of psychology in general assumes that "basic" human developments are representative of any population, specifically the Western-Educated-Industrialized-Rich and Democratic (W.E.I.R.D.) subjects relied on for the majority of its studies. Previous research generalizes findings from W.E.I.R.D. samples because many in the Psychological field assume certain aspects of development are exempt from, or unaffected by, life experiences. However, many of the assumptions have been proven incorrect or are not supported by empirical research. For example, according to Kohlberg, moral reasoning is dependent on cognitive abilities. While both analytical and holistic cognitive systems can develop in any adult, the West remains on the analytical end of the spectrum. In contrast, the non-West tends to rely on holistic processes. Furthermore, moral reasoning in the West focuses on aspects that support autonomy and the individual. In contrast, non-Western adults emphasize moral behaviors that support the community and maintain an image of holiness or divinity. Not all aspects of human development are universal, and we can learn a lot from observing different regions and subjects.

=== Indian model of human development ===
An example of a non-Western model of development stages is the Indian model, which focuses much of its psychological research on morality and interpersonal progress. The developmental stages in Indian models are rooted in Hinduism, which primarily outlines stages of life in the process of someone discovering their fate or Dharma. This cross-cultural model can add another perspective to psychological development in which the West behavioral sciences have not emphasized kinship, ethnicity, or religion.

Indian psychologists study the relevance of attentive families during the early stages of life. The early life stages conceptualize a different parenting style from the West because they do not try to rush children out of dependence. The family is meant to help the child grow into the next developmental stage at a particular age. This way, when children finally integrate into society, they are interconnected with those around them and reach renunciation when they are older. Children are raised in joint families so that, in early childhood (ages 6 months to 2 years), other family members gradually help wean the child from its mother. During ages 2 to 5, the parents do not rush toilet training. Instead of training the child to perform this behavior, the child learns to do it as they mature at their own pace.

This model of early human development encourages dependency, unlike Western models that value autonomy and independence. By being attentive and not forcing the child to become independent, the child becomes confident and develops a sense of belonging by late childhood and adolescence. This stage in life (5–15 years) is also when children start education and increase their knowledge of Dharma. It is within early and middle adulthood that we see moral development progress. Early, middle, and late adulthood are all concerned with caring for others and fulfilling Dharma. The main distinction between early adulthood and middle or late adulthood lies in the extent of their influence. Early adulthood emphasizes the importance of fulfilling the immediate family needs, until later adulthood, when they broaden their responsibilities to the general public. The old-age life stage development reaches renunciation or a complete understanding of Dharma.

Current mainstream views in psychology are opposed to the Indian model of human development. The criticism of such models is that they promote an overly protective parenting style and encourage excessive dependence. It focuses on interpersonal instead of individual goals. Also, there are some overlaps and similarities between Erikson's stages of human development and the Indian model, but both of them still have major differences. The West prefers Erickson's ideas over the Indian model because scientific studies support them. Life cycles based on Hinduism are less favored because they are not supported by research and focus on ideal human development.

== See also ==
- Attitude change
- Behavioral cusp
- Developmental psychobiology
- Developmental psychopathology
- Developmental systems theory
- Dynamic-maturational model of attachment and adaptation
- Educational psychology
- Ethnic identity development
- Group development
- Habilitation (human development)
- List of developmental psychologists
- Ontogenetic parade
- Outline of psychology
- Perceptual narrowing
- Pre- and perinatal psychology
- Scale error
- Sociometric status
- Early theories in child psychology

=== Journals ===
- Autism Research
- Child Development
- Development and Psychopathology
- Developmental Neuropsychology
- Developmental Psychology
- Developmental Review
- Developmental Science
- Human Development (journal)
- Journal of Abnormal Child Psychology
- Journal of Adolescent Health
- Journal of Autism and Developmental Disorders
- Journal of Child Psychology and Psychiatry
- Journal of Clinical Child and Adolescent Psychology
- Journal of Pediatric Psychology
- Journal of Research on Adolescence
- Journal of Youth and Adolescence
- Journal of the American Academy of Child and Adolescent Psychiatry
- Psychology and Aging
- Research in Autism Spectrum Disorders

== Sources ==
- Berk, Laura E. (2012). Infants and Children: Prenatal Through Middle Childhood. Allyn & Bacon. ISBN 978-0-205-83191-3.
- Erikson, Erik H.; Erikson, Joan M. (1998). The Life Cycle Completed. W. W. Norton & Company. ISBN 978-0-393-34743-2.
- Halpenny, Ann Marie; Pettersen, Jan (2013). Introducing Piaget. doi:10.4324/9780203111895. ISBN 978-1-136-28031-3.
