= Scale error =

In developmental psychology, Scale error is a serious attempt made by a young child to perform a task that is behaviorally inappropriate for the object because of a mistaken difference in the perceived and actual size of the objects involved. The child does not consider the size of their body in relation to the object and may attempt to fit into miniature objects or toys. An example of this would be a child attempting to slide down a toy slide or attempting to enter and drive a miniature toy car.

This phenomenon was first documented and studied by DeLoache et al. in 2004. Recent studies have added to the wealth of knowledge on the topic including evidence of the prevalence of scale error outside of the laboratory, as well as investigations into the frequency of scale errors in children.

== Criteria for scale errors ==
For an action to be considered a scale error under the strictest definition, a child must:

- Perform or attempt to perform part or all of the actions done with the large object, on the smaller object.
- Make actual physical contact with the relevant body part.
- Perform the behavior with such seriousness that they are obviously not pretending; often the behavior is repetitive, and the lack of success becomes frustrating to the child.

== DeLoache study ==
Psychologists DeLoache, Uttal, and Rosengren conducted and documented the first study on the aspect of Scale Error. In their study children were introduced to large (normal-sized) objects and given a chance to familiarize themselves with them. Some children were also prompted to engage in play behavior with the objects. After several minutes, the large objects were replaced with smaller versions of the same object. In several cases, regardless of prompting, the child attempted to interact with the small object in the same way they would have interacted with the large object.

The researchers believed that the error was caused by an underdeveloped functioning between the part of the brain that controls the actual physical movement with the part that controls the planning of the action, as well as a lack of inhibition. When the child sees the toy chair the occipital lobe, the part of the brain responsible for seeing the object and planning the next action, is activated and recognizes the object as a part of the chair category, but does not take the size of the chair into account. Next, the motor cortex, which controls the physical movement of the action, recognizes the appropriate movement/action for a chair, and the child then takes "appropriate" action—attempts to sit in the chair. During this step the child performs the action proportionate to the miniature object, and thus is able to carry out precise movements. However, the step itself is initiated based on a larger mental representation.

In older more developed children, these steps are usually inhibited by recognition and integration of the true miniature size of the object into the child's action plan. The child in this case would then go about playing with the toy normally.

The study also found that if the child is given the choice, they will never choose to interact with the smaller object over the larger object.

== Theoretical explanations ==
The original explanation proposed by DeLoache et al. (2004) attributed scale errors to a lack of inhibitory control, suggesting children fail to suppress an action plan triggered by object recognition. Ishibashi and Moriguchi (2017) directly tested this, finding no significant relationship between inhibitory control and scale error frequency in a sample of 54 children. Instead, conceptual understanding of size was the stronger predictor, suggesting scale errors reflect a gap in how children represent object dimensions rather than a failure to inhibit impulsive responses.

Milner and Goodale's two-stream model of visual processing offers a neurological account. The ventral stream processes object identity and semantic knowledge, while the dorsal stream guides real-time motor action using spatial information. In scale errors, the ventral stream identifies a miniature chair as a chair and activates a sitting routine, while the dorsal stream correctly scales the child's movements to the object's actual dimensions. This explains the core paradox: movements are physically precise, yet the action itself is entirely inappropriate.

Building on this, Glover's (2004) planning-control model proposes that action planning draws on semantic knowledge of what an object is for, whereas motor execution is guided in real time by actual spatial properties. Scale errors occur when the planning stage fires an inappropriate action programme based on categorical identity, while execution correctly adjusts to the miniature object's true size.

== Body Size Awareness ==
One explanation for scale errors involving the child's own body concerns body self-representation. Brownell, Zerwas, and Ramani (2007) found a clear dissociation: children performed poorly on tasks requiring body size awareness but showed no deficit on size comparison tasks not involving their own bodies, and performance on the two task types was statistically unrelated. This rules out a general spatial cognition deficit and points specifically to underdeveloped objective self-representation. However, body self-awareness cannot fully explain scale errors, as later research showed errors extend beyond actions involving the child's own body.

== Extension of scale errors ==
Ware et al. (2006) demonstrated that more than half of 74 children made scale errors with a doll, attempting to fit it into objects too small for it. Since the child's own body was not involved, this rules out body self-representation as the sole mechanism, suggesting the error applies to any agent the child is representing in action.

Casler et al. (2011) extended the phenomenon to instrumental tool use, finding a 65% error rate across 48 children in a free-play session. Errors persisted even when an appropriately sized alternative tool was available, and a separate study confirmed perceptual abilities were intact, with children selecting correctly sized tools approximately 90% of the time when no function-priming occurred. This points to teleofunctional reasoning: the tendency to associate objects so strongly with their function that size information is overridden during action planning.

== Additional studies ==
=== Rosengren et al. 2009 ===
According to surveys taken by the researchers, the phenomenon is not common; parents more often reported that their child did not engage in the behavior. It is speculated, however, that parents may not remember less striking errors or they may not have been present to witness them.

Additional studies were conducted to document and quantify how often scale errors were committed by children daily. Rosengren et al. (2009) instructed parent participants to observe their children and note when they engaged in a scale error. Parents were also instructed to differentiate between a scale error and pretense, or pretend play.

Rosengren et al. (2009) found that almost all parents documented an instance of scale error in their children. These results concluded that children will and do commit scale errors in early childhood. Specifically, 29 out of 30 parents reported at least one scale error, with an average of 3.2 scale errors per child. The frequency of errors appeared highest between 16 and 24 months, declining by around 27 months.

=== Ware et al. 2010 ===
In order to provide evidence of scale error prevalence outside of the laboratory, Ware et al. (2010) conducted multiple studies to explore the presence of scale errors in children's daily lives.

Throughout 2 studies, researchers had participants complete internet surveys questioning if the participant had ever seen a child engage in a scale error. Responses were screened and in the second study participants were interviewed through a secondary phone call about the incident they had identified.

Ware et al. (2010) concluded that scale errors occurred both in and out of the laboratory setting. The study provided the first evidence of children making scale errors outside of the laboratory setting. The findings also demonstrated that prior exposure to full-sized objects is not a necessary condition for scale errors to occur in everyday life.

=== Prevalence estimates ===
Prevalence estimates vary substantially by methodology. Ware et al. (2010) reported an 18% rate from retrospective online surveys, while Rosengren et al. (2009) found 97% when parents kept prospective real-time diaries. This disparity reflects how methodology shapes findings: retrospective surveys are prone to recall bias for infrequent behaviours, whereas prospective diaries capture events as they occur. Ishibashi et al. (2021) further confirmed that scale errors occur in classroom and home settings without prior lab-based priming.

== Individual differences ==
Scale error frequency varies considerably between children. Rosengren, Schein, and Gutiérrez (2010) found that one child produced 16 errors while others produced only one or none, and counter-intuitively, extended exposure to replica objects was initially associated with increased rather than decreased error rates.

Ishibashi and Uehara (2020) found that children who produced scale errors engaged in significantly less pretend play with miniature toys, while those without scale errors rapidly adjusted their behaviour, treating miniature objects as toys rather than functional objects. This suggests that flexible representational shifting, the capacity underlying symbolic play, may be what scale error producers lack.

== Vocabulary and perceptual bias ==
Grzyb et al. (2019) found that scale errors were more common in early talkers, with predicate vocabulary being a stronger predictor than noun vocabulary. This reframes scale errors as a by-product of a cognitive strength: richer semantic representations of object function make the planning system more susceptible to categorical override. Grzyb et al. (2017) added a perceptual dimension, finding that children who produced scale errors were less likely to detect size changes in objects, suggesting size may not be reliably encoded as a feature of object identity from the outset.

== Robustness of the phenomenon ==
DeLoache et al. (2013) showed that scale errors persisted even after children were explicitly told objects were small, demonstrating the phenomenon is not a product of inattention. The authors concluded that errors reflect a failure to incorporate size information into action planning rather than a failure to perceive it, consistent with Glover's (2004) framework.

== Age ==
The frequency of scale errors seems to differ for children across age ranges. Across 18-30 month olds, frequencies of scale error peaked around 24 months. Jiang and Rosengren (2018) note that scale errors require the ability to stand, sit, and walk, explaining why errors are not observed in infants below approximately 12 months. Error frequency declines as children develop stronger size concept understanding, typically tapering off by around 27 to 30 months.

== See also ==
- Developmental Psychology
- Make Believe
- Play
