= Forensic developmental psychology =

Forensic developmental psychology is a field of psychology that focuses on "children's actions and reactions in a forensic context" and "children's reports that they were victims or witnesses of a crime". Bruck and Poole (2002) first coined the term "forensic developmental psychology". Although forensic developmental psychology specifically focuses on a child's reliability, credibility, and competency in the courtroom setting, it also includes topics such as autobiographical memory, memory distortion, eyewitness identification, narrative construction, personality, and attachment.

== Distinction between forensic, developmental, and forensic developmental psychology ==
	Forensic psychology	Developmental psychology	Forensic developmental psychology
What is it?	Field of psychology that focuses on the field of criminal investigation and the law; Areas of study: "ability to testify in court, reformulating psychological findings into the legal language of the courtroom, providing information to legal personnel in a way that can be understood"	Field of psychology that studies growth and development throughout an individual's lifespan; Areas of study: Infant, Childhood and Adolescence development, early Adulthood, Middle Adulthood and Older Adults, Cognitive development	Field of psychology that focuses on children's actions and reactions in a forensic context; Areas of study: autobiographical memory, memory distortion, eyewitness identification, narrative construction, personality, and attachment
Work setting	Criminal and civic court systems; Treatment facilities	Schools, universities, nonprofit agencies, and hospitals; Day cares and preschools; Rehabilitation hospitals, clinics, or residential facilities (nursing homes)	Criminal and civic court systems
Types of patients	Individuals, families, adults, elderly, and juvenile populations; Prisons and correctional facilities; Governmental agencies (criminal profiling); Client base is mostly criminal	Physically and mentally disabled children and adults; Patients dealing with substance abuse; Victims of abuse; Families; Aging population	Strong focus on children and adolescents, but may include adults as well; Criminal and civic court systems
Career paths	Can be both lawyers and psychologists; Consultants to attorneys and the courts; Expert witnesses; Treatment facilities (develop intervention techniques and treatment programs for prisoners)	Research; Academia (Professors/Teachers); Psychologists	Lawyers; Psychologists; Consultants to attorneys and the courts; Expert witnesses

== Child testimony process ==
Similar to adults, children who testify must undergo a testimony process in order to determine their relative competency, reliability, and credibility. This is important because trauma resulting from exposure to an open courtroom or confrontation with a defendant can ultimately lead to inaccurate testimony.

There are several similarities and differences between the competency evaluation for adults and for children. Both adults and children must be deemed as competent in order to testify in court. With regards to children, competency refers to a child's capacity and relative intelligence, their ability to distinguish between truth and lie, and their duty to tell the truth. In order to determine a child's competency, four factors may be considered:

- the child's ability to distinguish between true and lies along with the duty to speak the truth,
- the child's ability to perceive the occurrence accurately during that time,
- the child's ability to independently recollect the occurrence and
- the child's ability to verbally translate their memory of the occurrence and to answer simple questions about the event.

These guidelines were determined by the Wheeler v. United States (1985) Supreme Court case in which a 5-year-old boy was the only witness to a murder. The boy's testimony was ruled as admissible on the grounds that he was "sufficiently intelligent", could "distinguish between truth and lies", and understand that he was "morally obligated to tell the truth". Although federal guidelines exist for determining a child's competency, the capacities required for a child to be deemed competent also vary from state to state. For example, some states may require a child to be able to differentiate between truth and lie as well as recall past incidents, whereas other states may only require that the child is able to tell the truth.

Along with competency, a child's reliability and credibility must be tested as well. However, the guidelines for a determining a child's reliability and credibility are not as stringent as determining the child's competency. Although it is important to establish a child's relative reliability and credibility for their testimony, a judge cannot bar a witness from testifying on the grounds that he or she is competent but not credible.

== Factors impacting children's reports ==
Although measures exist to try to prevent poor reliability, credibility, and accuracy of children's reports, research of the child testimony process indicates that there are several difficulties that may be associated with the child testimony process, especially with regards to eyewitness testimony. Topics such as language development, memory skills, susceptibility to suggestion, the truth-lie competency, and credibility and deception detection are being researched to determine their impact on a child's competency, reliability, and credibility.

=== Language development ===
Individual differences in language development and comprehension may cause difficulties in determining a child's relative competence with the child testimony process and the trial. Although attorneys are required to use language that is developmentally appropriate with young child witnesses, children may still have difficulty understanding the difficult terminology associated with the courtroom. Even if a child's report is accurate, adults can also make inaccurate inferences based on their report. However, some research suggests that the reliability of children's communicative competence can be minimized by better and clearer instructions as well as by more thorough preparation before the trial.

=== Memory skills ===
The inconsistency of children's memory potentially creates a problem with the reliability of children's reports. A study done by Klemfuss and Ceci (2012) indicates that "general memory skill is inconsistently associated with children's accuracy". Children younger than the age of 6 also tend to remember a higher proportion of details inaccurately in their reports when compared to children of ages 8 and 10. Along with the problem of poor memory development at a young age, there is a problem with remembering information accurately after a certain period of time. According to Beuscher and Roberts (2005), individuals tend to remember a higher ratio of accurate to inaccurate information over time.

=== Susceptibility to suggestion ===
Suggestibility is defined by Ceci and Bruck (1995) as "the degree to which the encoding, storage, retrieval, and reporting of events can be influenced by internal and external factors". Although children's autobiographical recall can be highly accurate in many situations, increased exposure to suggestion can potentially increase the inaccuracy of a child's report. While previous research focused on the impact of a single piece of misinformation on the accuracy of children's reports, current research is now focusing on how multiple suggestive techniques affect the accuracy of children's reports. Ceci & Friedman (2000) suggest that a combination of implicit and explicit suggestive techniques such as bribes, threats, and repetitions of questions can have a large impact on young children's reports. These techniques are especially prevalent when interviewer bias is present during an interview with a child. Interviewer bias refers to when an interviewers' own prejudices or opinions about the event influence the manner in which they conduct the interview, and can occur when interviewers mold the interview to maximize disclosures that are consistent with their beliefs by gathering confirmatory evidence and neglecting disconfirmatory evidence.

Several other factors may contribute to a child's susceptibility to suggestion such as internal or external factors. For example, the child's memory report could have been permanently altered which would be an internal factor, or the child could simply be trying to please the report interviewer or another adult which would be an external factor. Another factor that contributes to increased susceptibility to suggestion is seen through the use of peer pressure. Ceci and Bruck (2002) stated that children who were exposed to higher amounts of peer pressure were more prone to change their perception of the event in question even if their initial report was accurate. Although it is difficult to predict whether or not a child will be more susceptible to suggestion, age and language skills are currently the most reliable predictors of children's resistance to suggestion.

=== Truth-lie competency ===
Another difficulty encountered with a child's credibility and reliability in the courtroom setting is truth-lie competency. Truth-lie competency refers to a child's relative accurate conception of the truth, and how a child perceives the truth when compared to an adult's perceptions. In order to determine whether a child is providing truthful testimony, the judge must determine whether the child has an accurate conception of the truth from an adult perspective before the child's testimony. There are three traditional methods of assessing a child's ability to differentiate between truth and lies such as asking the child to (1) define two concepts, (2) explain the difference between truth and lies and (3) identify examples of truth and lies statements.

Although limited, research suggests that young children may have differing definitions of lies than older children and adults. Developmentally inappropriate methods of gauging a child's truth-lie competency could also hinder a child's ability to distinguish between truth and lie. Two specific factors that may also influence a child's definition of a lie include the intention of the speaker and the virulence of what is said. Furthermore, a child's perception of the truth can be influenced by personal gain or reward or by the child's desire to please significant others such as parents, lawyers, or therapists.

=== Credibility and deception detection ===
Although the legal system takes care to ensure that children are sufficiently competent before testifying, it is still difficult to determine a child's credibility. Because of the relative difficulty in determining a child's reliability and credibility, few techniques exist to determine a child's ability to recount narratives accurately. One potential method of determining the reliability of a child's report is by the number of "fantastical" or highly implausible or imaginary details within the narrative. According to Bruck, Ceci, & Hembrooke (2002), a higher number of fantastical details are correlated with false narratives. Furthermore, children who describe false narratives tend to creatively utilize incorrect information to construct a false narrative. Research also suggests that the accuracy and credibility of children's reports are closely related when reports are influenced by suggestion.

A study done by Nysse-Carris et al. (2011) had adults rate videos of children's truthfulness and deceitfulness. The study's results indicated that the adults' accuracy was low (only slightly above chance) when rating the children. Furthermore, the study concluded that adults tend to be more biased in labeling children as liars. In general, adults—even adults who are experts in the field—cannot reliably predict the accuracy of a child's report or a child's competence.

=== False Memories ===
Dr. Steven Ceci, a child development expert at Cornell University, warns people about the dangers of relying on eyewitness testimony of children without having looked at the information obtained. There’s a possibility that children can create false memories. Children who attended McMartin preschool outside of Los Angeles in the 1980s accused their caregivers of sexual abuse. The children's stories turned out to be false. However, Ceci said that the children in this example, as well as others, were not lying. "Their recollections have been affected by the constant, provocative interviews they were subjected to," he stated, adding that the kids were repeatedly given leading questions.

== What experts have to say about child testimony ==
=== Expert Testimony: Children as Witnesses ===
How accurate are children as witnesses in court? Dr. Lyn Haber, Ph.D., goes over the whole child interviewing protocol on how children are asked to testify in court and analyzes the ways in which people could be skeptical on the credibility and reliability of their testimonies. Before questioning the child, some things you might want to be aware of includes who questions the child, the experience of the interview, how many people are asking the questions, where the interview is taking place, and who is present. You should be careful during the questioning protocol, thinking about how the questions are being asked and how the child is answering them. Be mindful of using leading, misleading, biased, and repeated questions. Suggestions on what to ask include who has discussed the crime with the child and how often would they be asking them about it. Some factors included in making the child’s memory more accurate include no one pressuring the child to explain what happened, the child telling the event to a trusted adult immediately, the child being questioned by a trained specialist, and the child testifying under emotionally safe and supported conditions. Some factors that may make the child’s memory inaccurate include the event being frightening, the child reporting the event to an unfamiliar person or authority figure, being questioned in a frightening, unfamiliar setting, and the child being reported to tell the story often.

=== The Question of Credibility when it comes to Child Witnesses ===
Sometimes when police come across a crime, they are left with a single eye witness which raises the question of whether they can rely on the child for a reliable testimony. Dr. Steven Ceci is a child development expert at Cornell University and talks about how the memory of children and adults are different based on their past knowledge of things, but that doesn’t mean children are less reliable than adults when it comes to credibility. An instance of this is underlined in the 2002 Samantha Runnion case where the 5-year-old girl was kidnapped just outside her Stanton, Calif., home. The only person around to witness her kidnapping was Sarah Ahn, a playmate. Ahn had given the police a detailed description of the suspect and the car he drove. Her description was so detailed that days later, he was captured. Although, as Ceci says, there is a limit when it comes to validity in statements, especially when the child is a 2 or 3 year old. Ceci also claims that sometimes an adult’s witness can be less reliable than a young kid’s in the sense that they can cheat or lie.
