= Microgenetic design =

Scientific method

Microgenetic design (a.k.a. microgenetic method) is a scientific method in which the same setting is studied repeatedly in order to observe change in detail. In contrast to cross-sectional and longitudinal designs, which provide broad outlines of the process of change, microgenetic designs provide an in-depth analysis of the behavior of the system while it is changing. Although often associated with developmental psychology, the method has been applied in adult settings as well, and the method is applicable to any system—human or otherwise—whose behavior changes over time, and where it may be useful or important to analyze the details of these changes. The term "microgenetic" appears to have originated with Heinz Werner, who described a "genetic method" in the early part of the 20th century, and has been employed by many prominent psychologists since that time. (It is unclear when and where the "micro" prefix was added.)

== Vygotskian theory ==
Information-processing psychologists, particularly Robert S. Siegler, also have adopted the microgenetic method advocated by the Soviet psychologist Lev Vygotsky. The microgenetic method is derived from Vygotsky’s developmental approach:

"…to encompass in research the process of a given thing’s development in all its phases and changes…fundamentally means to discover its nature, its essence, for ‘it is only in movement that a body shows what it is’" (Vygotsky, 1978, p. 65).

== See also ==
- Developmental psychology
