= Manuela Beltrán University =

Private university in Bogotá, Colombia

- Universidad Manuela Beltrán
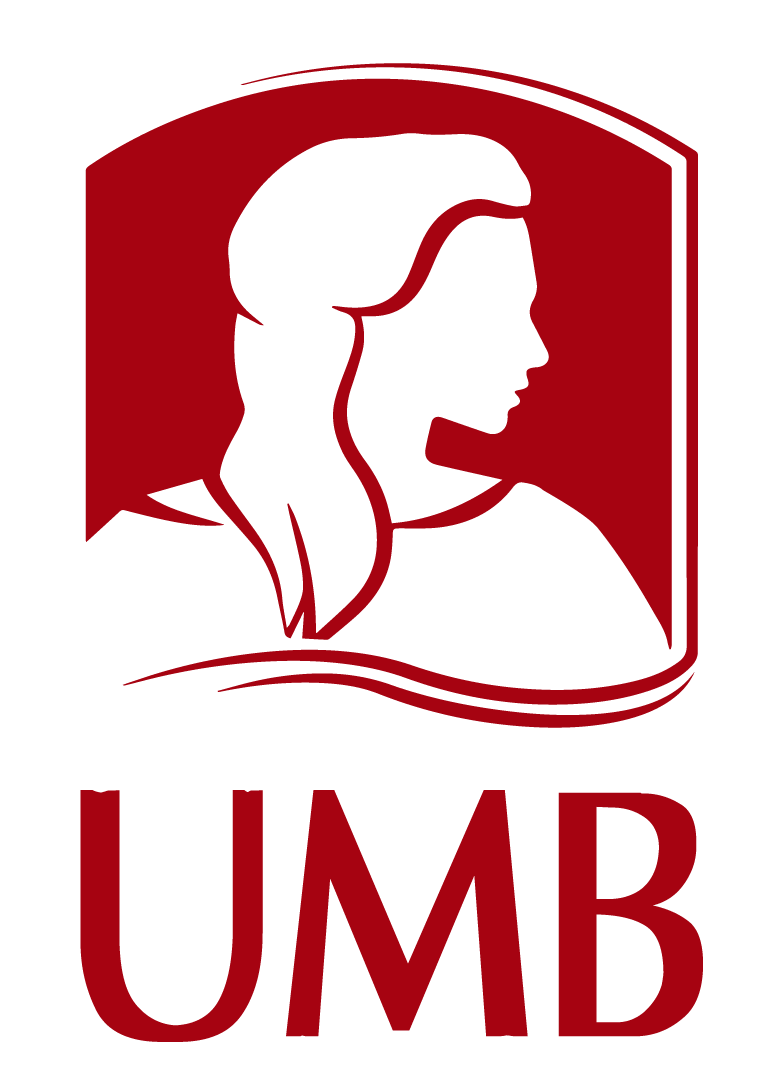
- Other names: UMB
- Motto: Formación para la libertad y el desarrollo
- Motto in English: Education for the freedom and development
- Type: Private
- Established: 1992
- Students: 8000
- Location: Bogotá, Colombia; 4°38′32″N 74°03′16″W
- Website: www.umb.edu.co

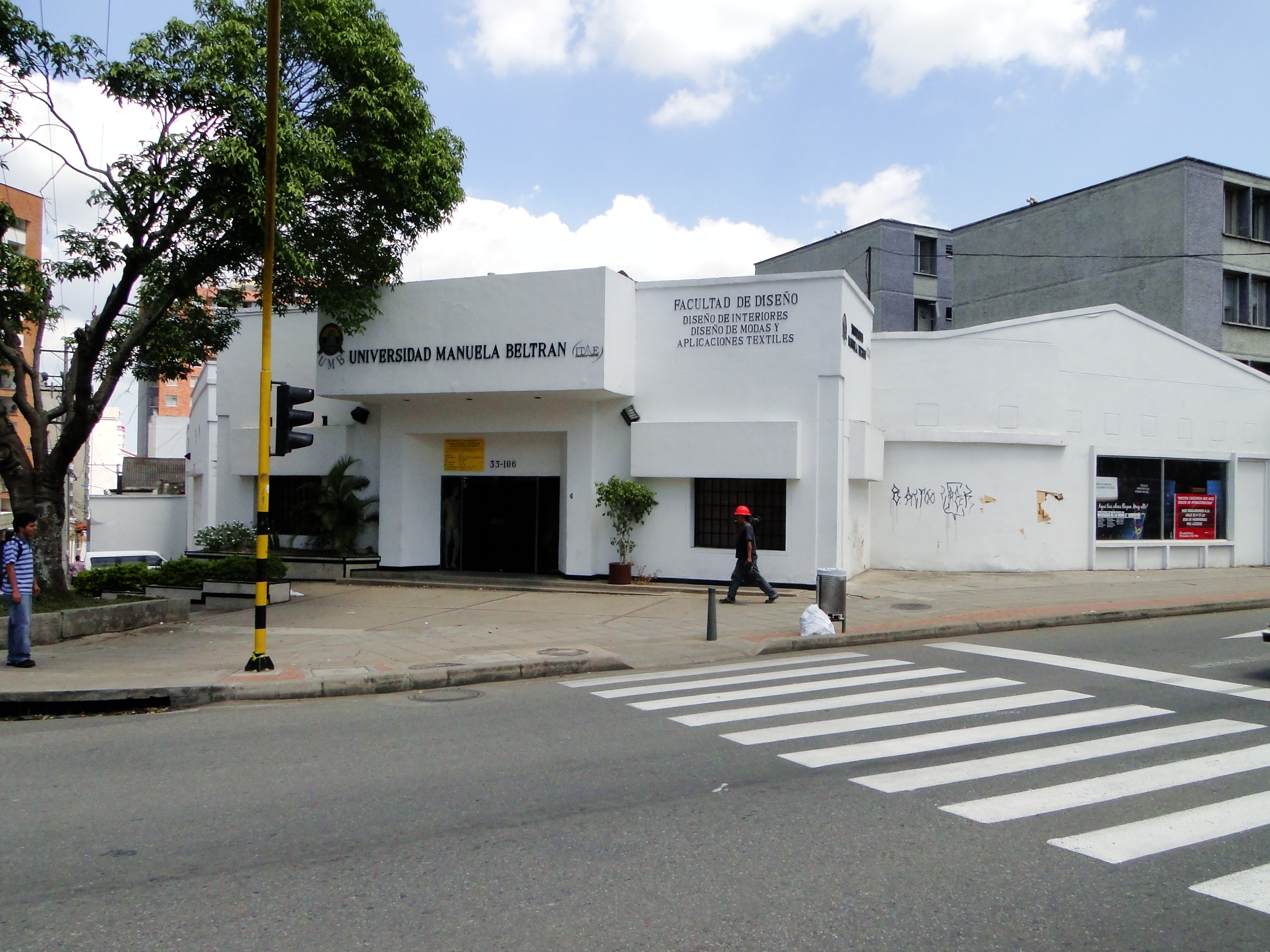
UMB Faculty of Design building

The Manuela Beltrán University (Spanish: Universidad Manuelta Beltrán, UMB) is a private university based in the city of Bogotá, Colombia.

== See also ==
- List of universities in Colombia
