= Journal of Pediatric Psychology =

- Discipline: Child psychology
- Language: English
- Edited by: Avani C. Modi

Publication details
- History: 1976-present
- Publisher: Oxford University Press
- Frequency: 12/year
- Impact factor: 3.624 (2021)

Standard abbreviations
- ISO 4: J. Pediatr. Psychol.

Indexing
- CODEN: JPPSDW
- ISSN: 0146-8693 (print); 1465-735X (web)

Links
- Journal homepage; Online access; Online archive

The Journal of Pediatric Psychology (JPP) is a peer-reviewed academic journal covering child psychology. It was established in 1976 and is published 12 times per year by Oxford University Press on behalf of the Society of Pediatric Psychology, division 54 of the American Psychological Association, of which it is the scientific publication. The editor-in-chief is Avani C. Modi (Cincinnati Children's Hospital Medical Center). According to the Journal Citation Reports, the journal has a 2021 impact factor of 3.624.
