= Journal of Clinical Anesthesia =

- Discipline: Anesthesiology
- Language: English
- Edited by: Alparslan Turan, MD.

Publication details
- History: 1988–present
- Publisher: Elsevier
- Frequency: 8 issues/year
- Impact factor: 6.039 (2019)

Standard abbreviations
- ISO 4: J. Clin. Anesth.

Indexing
- ISSN: 0952-8180 (print); 1873-4529 (web)
- OCLC no.: 173716089

Links
- Journal homepage; Online access; Online archive

The Journal of Clinical Anesthesia is a peer-reviewed medical journal covering a variety of topics in anesthesiology. It was established in 1988 and is published eight times per year by Elsevier. It is the official journal of the American Association of Clinical Directors, the Society for Airway Management, and the Orthopedic Anesthesia Pain Rehabilitation Society. The editor-in-chief is Alparslan Turan, MD (Cleveland Clinic). According to the Journal Citation Reports, the journal has a 2022 impact factor of 6.7.
