= The Journal of Pain =

- Discipline: Anesthesiology
- Language: English
- Edited by: Tonya M. Palermo

Publication details
- Former name(s): APS Journal, Pain Forum
- History: 1992-present
- Publisher: Elsevier on behalf of the United States Association for the Study of Pain
- Frequency: Monthly
- Impact factor: 4.621 (2019)

Standard abbreviations
- ISO 4: J. Pain

Indexing
- CODEN: JPOAB5
- ISSN: 1526-5900
- LCCN: sn99009246
- OCLC no.: 612294357

Links
- Journal homepage; Online access; Pain Forum online archive; APS Journal online archive

The Journal of Pain is a monthly peer-reviewed medical journal published by Elsevier on behalf of the United States Association for the Study of Pain and covers research and reviews on pain, including anesthesiology and palliative care and related educational and policy issues. The editor-in-chief is Tonya M. Palermo (University of Washington). The journal was established in 1992 as the APS Journal and was renamed Pain Forum in 1995 before obtaining its current name in 2000, with volume numbering restarting at 1. In December 2019, following the bankruptcy of the American Pain Society, the newly formed United States Association for the Study of Pain purchased the journal. According to the Journal Citation Reports, the journal has a 2019 impact factor of 4.621. The Journal is included in the Index Medicus and in MEDLINE.

== Editors-in-chief ==
- Mark Jensen
- Tonya M. Palermo
