= Early theories in child psychology =

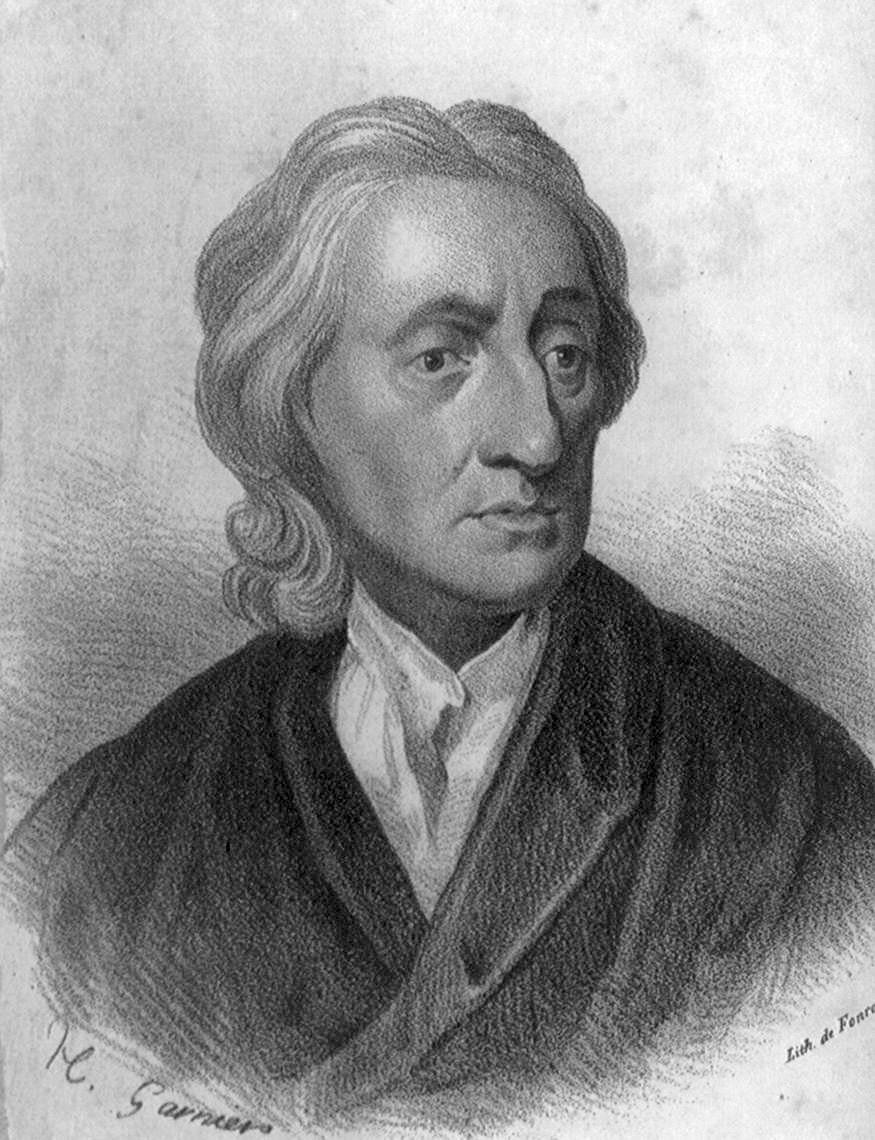
John Locke

Early theories in child psychology were advocated by three famous theorists: John Locke, Jean Jacques Rousseau and Charles Darwin. They represent three famous schools of thought, namely the influence of the child’s environment, the role of the child’s cognitive development and the relationship with evolutionary origins of behavior. These three schools formed the basis of modern developments in Child Psychology.

== John Locke (1632–1704) ==
John Locke believed that all children are born equal. They are like blank slates or tabula rasa. Their development takes place due to the influence of environment. The environment shapes a child’s behavior. The child can be groomed as a surgeon, actor, or artisan depending on the influence of the environment. The child's becoming a scoundrel, beggar or thief is due to the influence of the environment in which he grew up. Locke advised parents to reward good behavior with recognition and bad behavior with reprimands rather than material rewards and punishments.

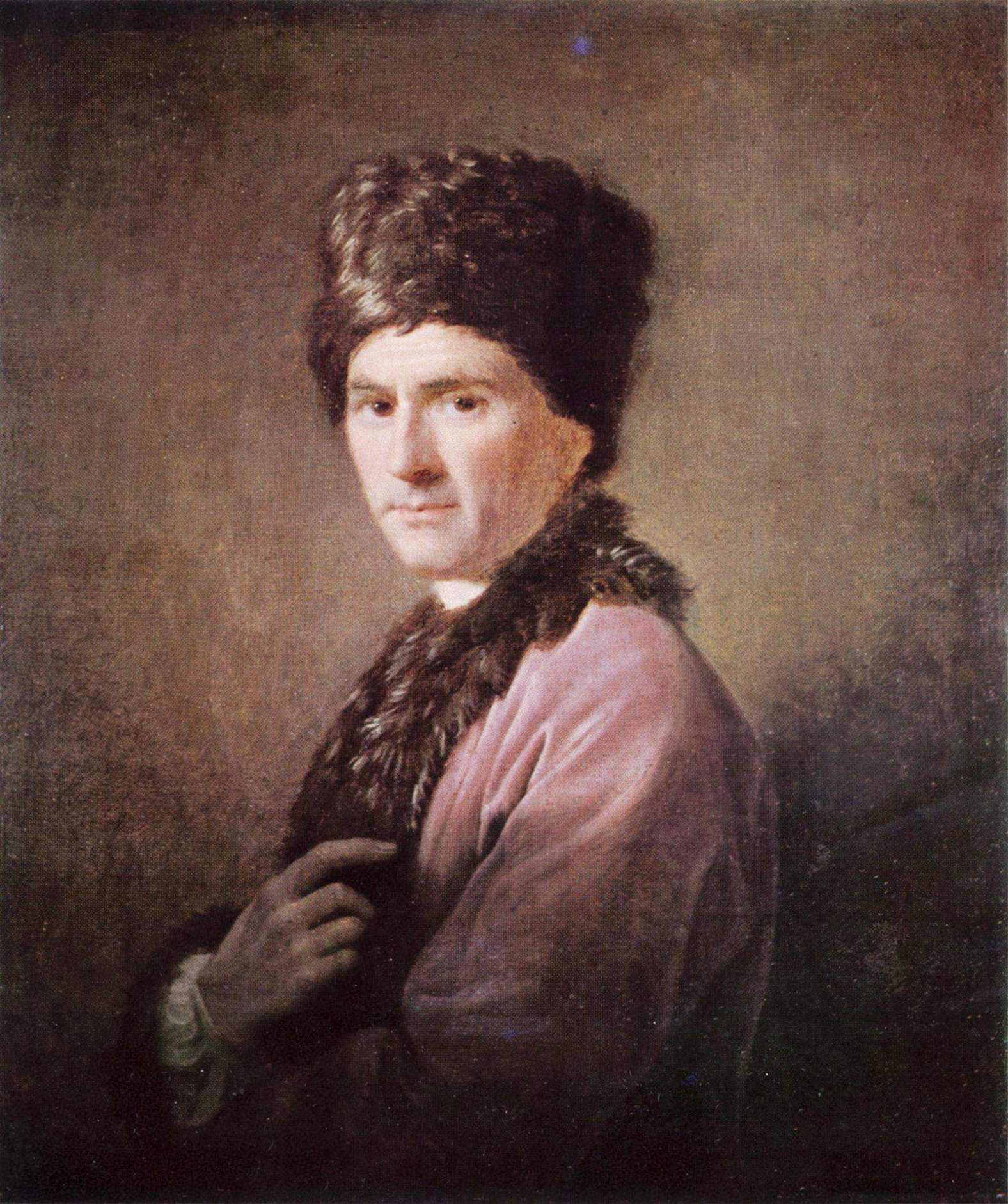
Jean Jacques Rousseau

== Jean Jacques Rousseau (1712–1778) ==
Jean Jacques Rousseau disagreed with Locke and believed that children are born with inherent talents and potential, which unfold as they grow. Growth is achieved as a result of experience and learning. The growth also followed a time table. They have innate feelings of right and wrong, fairness and unfairness. He also believed that children learn whatever the child did not inherently possess and for such learning the child depends on environment for interaction. Rousseau advocated strongly that in view of inherent potential, children should be facilitated and self learning is best way. In this way Rousseau disagreed from Locke and his model was called ‘nativism’. Rousseau highlighted his views on child development in his novel Emile. He mainly propagated three views, namely that children should be given intervention only at the appropriate time depending on their maturity, that children should be allowed to explore as inherently they possess the interest of discovery, and finally that they should be encouraged to follow their natural interest and inclination.

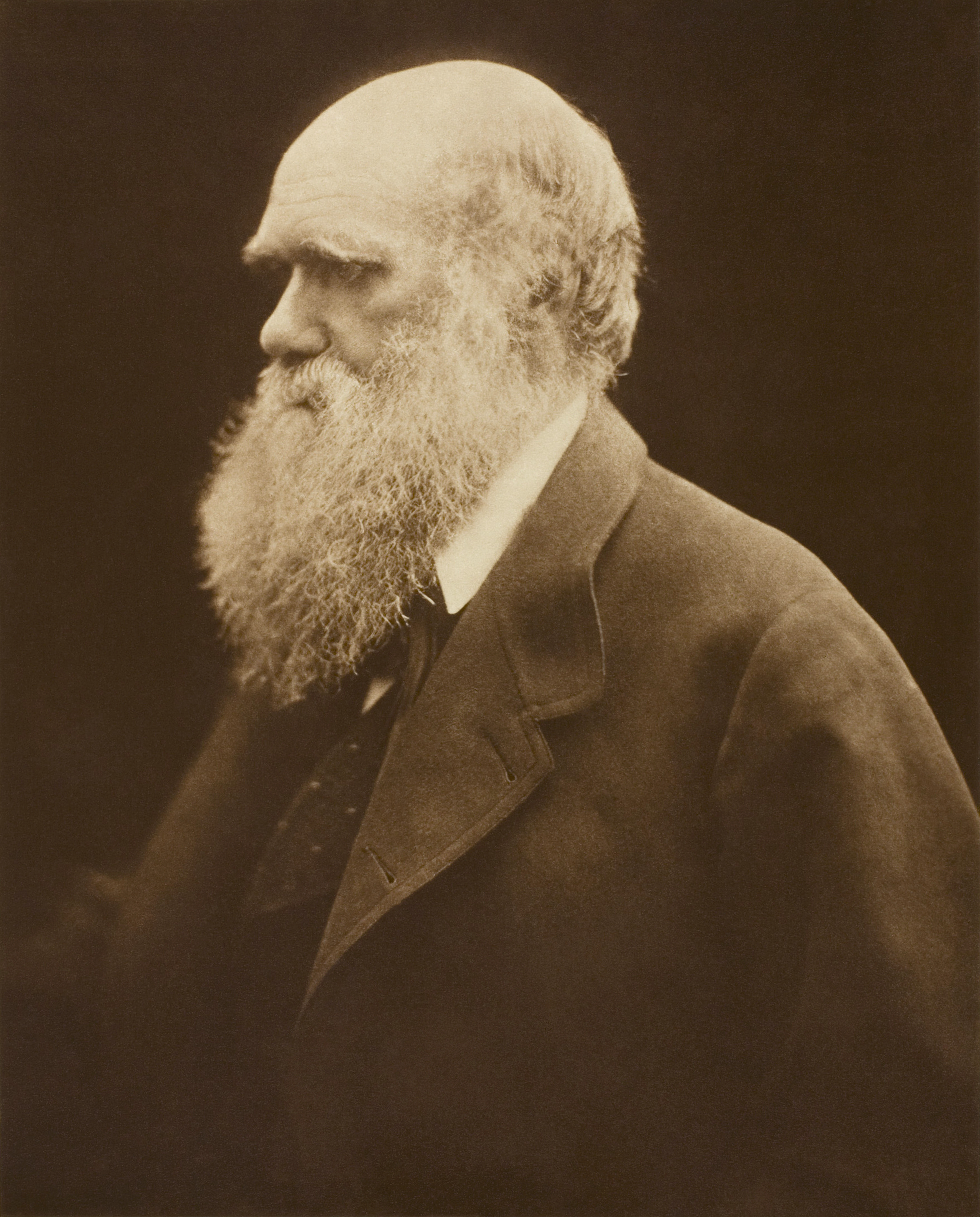
Charles Darwin

== Charles Darwin (1809–1882) ==
Charles Darwin suggested that any human behavior had its origin in the past which was essential for their survival. By observing his son's behavior, Darwin kept a record of the growth and behavior of the child. Even though Darwin's theory of evolution is not directly related to child development, Darwin noted that the stages of evolution of a species largely resembled the stages of development of the child. His theory helped other biologists develop theories along similar lines.
