= Current Medical Science =

- Discipline: Medicine
- Language: English, German
- Edited by: Jian-guo Chen

Publication details
- Former name(s): Acta Academiae Medicinae Wuhan; Journal of Tongji Medical University; Journal of Huazhong University of Science and Technology Medical Sciences
- History: 1981–present
- Publisher: Springer Science+Business Media
- Frequency: Bimonthly
- Impact factor: 0.948 (2017)

Standard abbreviations
- ISO 4: Curr. Med. Sci.

Indexing
- ISSN: 2096-5230 (print); 2523-899X (web)
- LCCN: 2018243250
- OCLC no.: 1063597477

Links
- Journal homepage; Online archive

Current Medical Science is a bimonthly peer-reviewed general medical journal. It was established in 1981 and is published by Springer Science+Business Media in a partnership with China's Huazhong University of Science and Technology. The editor-in-chief is Jian-guo Chen. According to the Journal Citation Reports, the journal has a 2017 impact factor of 0.948.
