= Yonsei Medical Journal =

- Discipline: Medicine
- Language: English

Publication details
- History: 1960-present
- Publisher: Yonsei University, College of Medicine (South Korea)

Standard abbreviations
- ISO 4: Yonsei Med. J.

Indexing
- ISSN: 0513-5796

Links
- Journal homepage

The Yonsei Medical Journal is a general medical journal which has been published since 1960 by the Yonsei University, College of Medicine. It is published bimonthly.

The journal covers in all areas related to medicine based on clinical or basic research. The editor-in-chief is In-Hong Choi.

== Indexing ==
Since YMJ became the first Korean journal indexed in Index Medicus in 1962, YMJ has been indexed/tracked/covered by MEDLINE, PubMed, PubMed Central, Science Citation Index (SCI), BIOSIS Previews, SCOPUS, Embase, Chemical Abstracts Service (CAS), KoreaMed, Synapse, KoMCI, CrossRef and Google Scholar. Full text PDF files are available at YMJ Archive.

== See also ==
- Current Medical Science
- British Medical Bulletin
