= Digital health interventions =

Healthcare interventions and treatments delivered via digital platforms

Digital health interventions, or digital healthcare interventions, commonly referenced as DHIs in scientific articles, are technology-based solutions created to support healthcare systems, improve health outcomes, and enhance patient engagement in healthcare. Digital health interventions have emerged as an alternative in healthcare that may enable improved health outcomes, increase healthcare delivery, and empower patients. Commonly, it offers options to provide treatments, monitor health conditions, assist patients, and enable healthcare professionals to extend their services. Health mobile applications have become more popular - as mentioned by Butcher and Hussain, in 2022, more than 100,000 healthcare mobile applications were offered in Apple and Google app stores. As of 2022, over 100,000 healthcare apps were available in major app stores, underscoring the growing integration of digital tools in healthcare management. These interventions may utilise various digital technologies and applications, besides mobile apps and websites, and they may comprehend wearables, biosensors, and Internet of Things

== Use ==
DHIs are usually applied for:

- Self-management tools: applications and platforms that help patients manage chronic conditions like diabetes. or hypertension.
- Self-education and health promotion tools: educational material designed to leverage the population's knowledge regarding one specific health topic and promote healthy behaviours.
- Digital therapeutics: Software-based interventions designed to prevent, manage, or treat medical disorders.. Digital therapeutics refer to software-based interventions designed to prevent, manage, or treat specific medical conditions, often integrating behavioral health therapies.
- Clinical documentation support: tools used by healthcare professionals to assist with drafting and reviewing clinical notes, including ambient documentation systems, such as those used by Twofold Health, used alongside electronic health records.

Murray et al. detailed that DHIs can encompass "information, psycho-education, personal stories, formal decision aids, behaviour change support, interactions with HCP and other patients, self-assessment or monitoring tools (questionnaires, wearables, monitors, and effective theory-based psychological interventions developed for face-to-face delivery such as cognitive behavioural therapy or mindfulness training."

=== Current use ===
Digital healthcare interventions have being applied to different contexts and scenarios:

- To provide access to healthcare services, especially in underserved areas and geographically distant regions.
- Digital health platforms may also facilitate remote consultations between patients and registered medical practitioners. In Australia, Updoc provides an online platform through which users can consult with AHPRA-registered partner doctors for services including medical advice, prescriptions, referral letters and medical certificates.
- To facilitate access to people with disabilities and mobility limitations.
- To facilitate access to health and educational tools to informal caregivers.
- To reduce healthcare costs and increase distribution to population.
- To empower patients to take a more active role in their health management.
- To support healthier dietary behaviors in children and adolescents, especially by involving parents in interventions; a 2025 systematic review found that mobile- and web-based interventions were particularly effective in improving fruit intake, and that targeting parents rather than children directly may reduce sugar-sweetened beverage consumption in children under school age.

While DHIs offer significant benefits, there are also challenges to consider. A major challenge for DHIs is the digital divide, which includes disparities in access to technology, internet connectivity, and digital literacy, especially in underserved populations. The digital divide is one of the most common, and it concerns disparities in access to technology and digital literacy. Data privacy and security are another issue, as protecting sensitive health information may be challenging and subject to changes in laws and governmental regulations. The expansion of digital health interventions offers a promising path to reduce healthcare disparities, but it also requires addressing issues such as user engagement, long-term sustainability, and the inclusivity of various demographic groups.

DHIs have expanded at an accelerated pace - according to Gentili et al. (2022), "more than 120 countries are prioritizing health-related digital progress". However, evidence of the DHI's cost-effectiveness is still limited. While the potential for cost savings is clear, studies evaluating the cost-effectiveness of DHIs are still limited, and further research is needed to assess their long-term financial impact. Despite the rapid growth in the adoption of DHIs, concerns about their effectiveness in diverse populations and their integration into existing healthcare systems continue to warrant further examination.
