= Sensorimotor =

Sensorimotor or sensory-motor may refer to:

- Sensory motor amnesia
- Sensorimotor rhythm
- Sensory-motor coupling
- The sensorimotor stage in Piaget's theory of cognitive development
- Sensorimotor (album), by Lusine
