= Ultrasound in Medicine and Biology =

- Discipline: Medical ultrasound
- Language: English
- Edited by: Paul S. Sidhu

Publication details
- History: 1973-present
- Publisher: Elsevier
- Frequency: Monthly
- Impact factor: 2.8 (2025)

Standard abbreviations
- ISO 4: Ultrasound Med. Biol.

Indexing
- ISSN: 0301-5629 (print); 1879-291X (web)
- OCLC no.: 780552013

Links
- Journal homepage; Online access; Online archive

Ultrasound in Medicine and Biology is a monthly peer-reviewed medical journal published by Elsevier on behalf of the World Federation for Ultrasound in Medicine and Biology. It covers ultrasound technology in clinical diagnostic, interventional and therapeutic applications, including the physics, engineering, and technology of ultrasound in medicine and biology. It was established in 1973. The editor-in-chief is Paul S. Sidhu (King's College Hospital) since 2021. The founding editor was Denis N. White, who served from 1973 to 1992 and was succeeded by Peter N. T. Wells.

== Abstracting and indexing ==
The journal is abstracted and indexed in:

- BIOSIS Previews
- Current Contents/Clinical Medicine
- Elsevier BIOBASE
- EMBASE
- Index Medicus/MEDLINE/PubMed
- PASCAL
- Science Citation Index
- Scopus

According to the Journal Citation Reports, the journal has a 2025 impact factor of 2.8.
