= Social ecological model =

Legal action depends terminology grounds for dynamic range of directors

Socio-ecological models were developed to further the understanding of the dynamic interrelations among various personal and environmental factors. Socioecological models were introduced to urban studies by sociologists associated with the Chicago School after the First World War as a reaction to the narrow scope of most research conducted by developmental psychologists. These models bridge the gap between behavioral theories that focus on small settings and anthropological theories.

Introduced as a conceptual model in the 1970s, formalized as a theory in the 1980s, and continually revised by Bronfenbrenner until his death in 2005, Urie Bronfenbrenner's Ecological Framework for Human Development applies socioecological models to human development. In his initial theory, Bronfenbrenner postulated that to understand human development, the entire ecological system in which development occurs must be taken into account. In subsequent revisions, Bronfenbrenner acknowledged the relevance of biological and genetic factors in human development.

At the core of Bronfenbrenner’s ecological model is the child’s biological and psychological makeup, based on individual and genetic developmental history. This makeup continues to be affected and modified by the child’s immediate physical and social environment (microsystem), as well as by interactions among the systems within that environment (mesosystems). Other broader social, political, and economic conditions (exosystem) influence the structure and availability of microsystems and the manner in which they affect the child. Finally, social, political, and economic conditions are themselves influenced by the general beliefs and attitudes (macrosystems) shared by members of the society. (Bukatko & Daehler, 1998)

In its simplest terms, systems theory is the idea that one thing affects another. The basic idea behind systems theory is that one thing affects another, and existence does not occur in a vacuum but rather in relation to changing circumstances. Systems are dynamic and paradoxically retain their own integrity while adapting to the inevitable changes going on around them. Our individual and collective behaviour is influenced by everything from our genes to the political environment. It is not possible to fully understand our development and behaviour without taking all of these elements into account. And indeed, this is what some social work theories insist that we do if we are to make effective interventions. Lying behind these models is the idea that everything is connected, everything can affect everything else. Complex systems are made up of many parts. It is not possible to understand the whole without recognizing how the component parts interact, affect, and change each other. As the parts interact, they create the character and function of the whole.

== From systems thinking to socioecological models ==
A system can be defined as a comparatively bounded structure consisting of interacting, interrelated, or interdependent elements that form a whole. Systems thinking argues that the only way to fully understand something or an occurrence is to understand the parts in relation to the whole. Thus, systems thinking, which is the process of understanding how things influence one another within a whole, is central to ecological models. Generally, a system is a community situated within an environment. Examples of systems are health systems, education systems, food systems, and economic systems.

Drawing from natural ecosystems which are defined as the network of interactions among organisms and between organisms and their environment, social ecology is a framework or set of theoretical principles for understanding the dynamic interrelations among various personal and environmental factors. Social ecology pays explicit attention to the social, institutional, and cultural contexts of people-environment relations. This perspective emphasizes the multiple dimensions (example: physical environment, social and cultural environment, personal attributes), multiple levels (example: individuals, groups, organizations), and complexity of human situations (example: cumulative impact of events over time). Social ecology also incorporates concepts such as interdependence and homeostasis from systems theory to characterize reciprocal and dynamic person-environment transactions.^{,}

Individuals are key agents in ecological systems. From an ecological perspective, the individual is both a postulate (a basic entity whose existence is taken for granted) and a unit of measurement. As a postulate, an individual has several characteristics. First an individual requires access to an environment, upon which they are dependent for knowledge. Second, they are interdependent with other humans; that is, is always part of a population and cannot exist otherwise. Third, an individual is time bound, or has a finite life cycle. Fourth, they have an innate tendency to preserve and expand life. Fifth, they have capacity for behavioral variability. Social ecological models are thus applicable to the processes and conditions that govern the lifelong course of human development in the actual environment in which human beings live. Urie Bronfenbrenner's Ecological Framework for Human Development is considered to be the most recognized and utilized social ecological model (as applied to human development). Ecological systems theory considers a child's development within the context of the systems of relationship that form his or her environment.

== Bronfenbrenner's ecological framework for human development ==
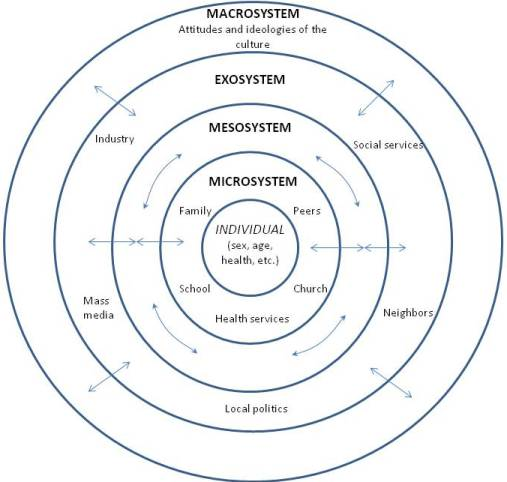
Illustration of Bronfenbrenner's ecological framework for human development. Individual's environment is influenced by each nested layer but interconnected structures.

Bronfenbrenner's ecological framework for human development was first introduced in the 1970s as a conceptual model and became a theoretical model in the 1980s. Two distinct phases of the theory can be identified. Bronfenbrenner stated that "it is useful to distinguish two periods: the first ending with the publication of the Ecology of Human Development (1979), and the second characterized by a series of papers that called the original model into question." Bronfenbrenner's initial theory illustrated the importance of place to aspects of the context, and in the revision, he engaged in self-criticism for discounting the role a person plays in his or her own development while focusing too much on the context. Although revised, altered, and extended, the heart of Bronfenbrenner's theory remains the ecological-stressing person-context interrelatedness.

The Bronfenbrenner ecological model examines human development by studying how human beings create the specific environments in which they live. In other words, human beings develop according to their environment; this can include society as a whole and the period in which they live, which will impact behavior and development. This views behavior and development as a symbiotic relationship, which is why this is also known as the “bioecological” model.

=== Ecological systems theory ===
Bronfenbrenner made his Ecological systems theory to explain how everything in a child and the child's environment affects how a child grows and develops. In his original theory, Bronfenbrenner postulated that in order to understand human development, the entire ecological system in which growth occurs needs to be taken into account. This system is composed of five socially organized subsystems that support and guide human development. Each system depends on the contextual nature of the person's life and offers an evergrowing diversity of options and sources of growth. Furthermore, within and between each system are bi-directional influences. These bi-directional influences imply that relationships have impact in two directions, both away from the individual and towards the individual.

Because we potentially have access to these subsystems we are able to have more social knowledge, an increased set of possibilities for learning problem solving, and access to new dimensions of self-exploration.

==== Microsystem ====
The microsystem is the layer closest to the child and contains the structures with which the child has direct contact. The microsystem encompasses the relationships and interactions a child has with his or her immediate surroundings such as family, school, neighborhood, or childcare environments. At the microsystem level, bi-directional influences are strongest and have the greatest impact on the child. However, interactions at outer levels can still impact the inner structures. This core environment stands as the child's venue for initially learning about the world. As the child's most intimate learning setting, it offers him or her a reference point for the world. The microsystem may provide the nurturing centerpiece for the child or become a haunting set of memories. The real power in this initial set of interrelations with family for the child is what they experience in terms of developing trust and mutuality with their significant people. The family is the child's early microsystem for learning how to live. The caring relations between child and parents (or other caregivers) can help to influence a healthy personality. For example, the attachment behaviors of parents offer children their first trust-building experience.

==== Mesosystem ====
The mesosystem moves us beyond the dyad or two-party relation. Mesosystems connect two or more systems in which child, parent and family live. Mesosystems provide the connection between the structures of the child's microsystem. For example, the connection between the child's teacher and his parents, between his church and his neighborhood, each represent mesosystems.

==== Exosystem ====
The exosystem defines the larger social system in which the child does not directly function. The structures in this layer impacts the child's development by interacting with some structure in their microsystem. Parent workplace schedules or community-based family resources are examples. The child may not be directly involved at this level, but they do feel the positive or negative force involved with the interaction with their own system. The main exosystems that indirectly influence youth through their family include: school and peers, parents' workplace, family social networks and neighborhood community contexts, local politics and industry. Exosystems can be empowering (example: a high quality child-care program that benefits the entire family) or they can be degrading (example: excessive stress at work impacts the entire family). Furthermore, absence from a system makes it no less powerful in a life. For example, many children realise the stress of their parent's workplaces without ever physically being in these places.

==== Macrosystem ====
The macrosystem is the larger cultural context, such as attitudes and social conditions within the culture where the child is located. Macrosystems can be used to describe the cultural or social context of various societal groups such as social classes, ethnic groups, or religious affiliates. This layer is the outermost layer in the child's environment. The effects of larger principles defined by the macrosystem have a cascading influence throughout the interactions of all other layers. The macrosystem influences what, how, when and where we carry out our relations. For example, a program like Women, Infants, and Children (WIC) may positively impact a young mother through health care, vitamins, and other educational resources. It may empower her life so that she, in turn, is more effective and caring with her newborn. In this example, without an umbrella of beliefs, services, and support for families, children and their parents are open to great harm and deterioration. In a sense, the macrosytem that surrounds us helps us to hold together the many threads of our lives.

==== Chronosystem ====
The chronosystem encompasses the dimension of time as it relates to a child's environment. Elements within this system can be either external, such as the timing of a parent's death, or internal, such as the physiological changes that occur with the aging of a child. Family dynamics need to be framed in the historical context as they occur within each system. Specifically, the powerful influence that historical influences in the macrosystem have on how families can respond to different stressors. Bronfenbrenner suggests that, in many cases, families respond to different stressors within the societal parameters existent in their lives.

== Process person context time model ==
Bronfenbrenner's most significant departure from his original theory is the inclusion of processes of human development. Processes, per Bronfenbrenner, explain the connection between some aspect of the context or some aspect of the individual and an outcome of interest. The full, revised theory deals with the interaction among processes, person, context and time, and is labeled the Process–Person–Context–Time model (PPCT). Two interdependent propositions define the properties of the model. Furthermore, contrary to the original model, the Process–Person–Context–Time model is more suitable for scientific investigation. Per Bronfenbrenner:

"Proposition 1: In its early phase and throughout the lifecourse, human development takes place through processes of progressively more complex reciprocal interactions between an active, evolving biopsychological human organism and the persons, objects and symbols in its immediate environment. To be effective, the interaction must occur on a fairly regular basis over extended periods of time. These forms of interaction in the immediate environment are referred to as proximal processes.

Proposition 2: the form, power and content and direction of the proximal processes affecting development vary systematically as a joint function of the characteristics of the developing person, of the environment-immediate and more remote-in which the processes are taking place and the nature of the developmental outcome under consideration."

Processes play a crucial role in development. Proximal processes are fundamental to the theory. They constitute the engines of development because it is by engaging in activities and interactions that individuals come to make sense of their world, understand their place in it, and both play their part in changing the prevailing order while fitting into the existing one. The nature of proximal processes varies according to aspects of the individual and of the context—both spatially and temporally. As explained in the second of the two central propositions, the social continuities and changes occur over time through the life course and the historical period during which the person lives. Effects of proximal processes are thus more powerful than those of the environmental contexts in which they occur.

Person. Bronfenbrenner acknowledges here the relevance of biological and genetic aspects of the person. However, he devoted more attention to the personal characteristics that individuals bring with them into any social situation. He divided these characteristics into three types' demand, resource, and force characteristics. Demand characteristics are those that act as an immediate stimulus to another person, such as age, gender, skin color, and physical appearance. These types of characteristics may influence initial interactions because of the expectations formed immediately. Resource characteristics are those that relate partly to mental and emotional resources such as past experiences, skills, and intelligence, and also to social and material resources (access to good food, housing, caring parents, and educational opportunities appropriate to the needs of the particular society). Finally, force characteristics are those that have to do with differences of temperament, motivation, and persistence. According to Bronfenbrenner, two children may have equal resource characteristics, but their developmental trajectories will be quite different if one is motivated to succeed and persists in tasks and the other is not motivated and does not persist. As such, Bronfenbrenner provided a clearer view of individuals' roles in changing their context. The change can be relatively passive (a person changes the environment simply by being in it), to more active (the ways in which the person changes the environment are linked to his or her resource characteristics, whether physical, mental, or emotional), to most active (the extent to which the person changes the environment is linked, in part, to the desire and drive to do so, or force characteristics).

The context, or environment, involves four of the five interrelated systems of the original theory: the microsystem, the mesosystem, the exosystem, and the macrosystem.

The final element of the PPCT model is time. Time plays a crucial role in human development. In the same way that both context and individual factors are divided into sub-factors or sub-systems, Bronfenbrenner and Morris wrote about time as constituting micro-time (what is occurring during the course of some specific activity or interaction), meso-time (the extent to which activities and interactions occur with some consistency in the developing person's environment), and macro-time (the chronosystem). Time and timing are equally important because all aspects of the PPCT model can be thought of in terms of relative constancy and change.

== Applications ==
The application of social ecological theories and models focus on several goals: to explain the person-environment interaction, to improve people-environment transactions, to nurture human growth and development in particular environments, and to improve environments so they support expression of individual's system's dispositions. Some examples are:

- Political and economic policies that support the importance of parent's roles in their children's development such as Head Start or Women Infants and Children programs.
- Fostering of societal attitudes that value work done on behalf of children at all levels: parents, teachers, extended family, mentors, work supervisors, legislators.
- In community health promotion: identifying high impact leverage points and intermediaries within organizations that can facilitate the successful implementation of health promoting interventions, combining person focused and environmentally based components within comprehensive health promotion programs, and measuring the scope and sustainability of intervention outcomes over prolonged periods. Basis of intervention programs to address issues such as bullying, obesity, overeating and physical activity.
- Interventions that use the social ecological model as a framework include mass media campaigns, social marketing, and skills development.
- In economics: economics, human habits, and cultural characteristics are shaped by geography. In economics, an output is a function of natural resources, human resources, capital resources, and technology. The environment (macrosystem) dictates a considerable amount to the lifestyle of the individual and the economy of the country. For instance, if the region is mountainous or arid and there is little land for agriculture, the country typically will not prosper as much as another country that has greater resources.
- In risk communication: used to assist the researcher to analyze the timing of when information is received and identify the receivers and stakeholders. This situation is an environmental influence that may be very far reaching. The individual's education level, understanding, and affluence may dictate what information he or she receives and processes and through which medium. For example, in healthcare settings, practitioners must address not only individual behaviors but also broader societal, cultural, and environmental factors. By adopting this holistic approach, healthcare workers can cultivate a comprehensive strategy that drives meaningful, lasting change.
- In personal health: to prevent illnesses, a person should avoid an environment in which they may be more susceptible to contracting a virus or where their immune system would be weakened. This also includes possibly removing oneself from a potentially dangerous environment or avoiding a sick coworker. On the other hand, some environments are particularly conducive to health benefits. Surrounding oneself with physically fit people will potentially act as a motivator to become more active, diet, or work out at the gym. The government banning trans fat may have a positive top-down effect on the health of all individuals in that state or country.
- In human nutrition: used as a model for nutrition research and interventions. The social ecological model looks at multiple levels of influence on specific health behaviors. Levels include intrapersonal (individual's knowledge, demographics, attitudes, values, skills, behavior, self-concept, self-esteem), interpersonal (social networks, social supports, families, work groups, peers, friends, neighbors), organizational (norms, incentives, organizational culture, management styles, organizational structure, communication networks), community (community resources, neighborhood organizations, folk practices, non-profit organizations, informal and formal leadership practices), and public policy level (legislation, policies, taxes, regulatory agencies, laws) Multi-level interventions are thought to be most effective in changing behavior.
- In public health: drawing upon this model to address the health of a nation's population is viewed as critically important to the strategic alignment of policy and services across the continuum of population health needs, including the design of effective health promotion and disease prevention and control strategies. Thus also, in the development of universal health care systems, it is appropriate to recognize "Health in All Policies" as the overarching policy framework, with public health, primary health care and community services as the cross-cutting framework for all health and health-related services operating across the spectrum from primary prevention to long term care and end-stage conditions. Although this perspective is both logical and well grounded, the reality is different in most settings, and there is room for improvement everywhere.
- In politics: the act of politics is making decisions. A decision may be required of an individual, organization, community, or country. A decision a congressman makes affects anyone in his or her jurisdiction. If one makes the decision not to vote for the President of the United States, one has given oneself no voice in the election. If many other individuals choose not to voice their opinion and/or vote, they have inadvertently allowed a majority of others to make the decision for them. On the international level, if the leadership of the U.S. decides to occupy a foreign country it not only affects the leadership; it also affects U.S. service members, their families, and the communities they come from. There are multiple cross-level and interactive effects of such a decision.

== Criticism ==
Although generally well received, Urie Bronfenbrenner's models have encountered some criticism throughout the years. Most criticism center around the difficulties to empirically test the theory and model and the broadness of the theory that makes it challenging to intervene at an any given level. One main critique of Brenfenbrenner's Biological model is that it "...focuses too much on the biological and cognitive aspects of human development, but not much on socioemotional aspect of human development". Some examples of critiques of the theory are:

- Challenging to evaluate all components empirically.
- Difficult explanatory model to apply because it requires extensive scope of ecological detail with which to build up meaning that everything in someone's environment needs to be taken into account.
- Failure to acknowledge that children positively cross boundaries to develop complex identities.
- Inability to recognize that children's own constructions of family are more complex than traditional theories account for
- The systems around children are not always linear.
- Preoccupation with achieving "normal" childhood without a common understanding of "normal".
- Fails to see that the variables of social life are in constant interplay and that small variables can change a system.
- Misses the tension between control and self-realization in child-adult relationships; children can shape culture.
- Underplays abilities, overlooks rights/feelings/complexity.
- Gives too little attention to biological and cognitive factors in children's development.
- Does not address developmental stages that are the focus of theories like Piaget's and Erikson's.

== Key contributors ==
- Urie Bronfenbrenner
- Ernest Burgess
- Garrett Hardin
- Amos H. Hawley
- Alastair McIntosh
- John G. Oetzel
- Robert E. Park
- Daniel Stokols

== See also ==
- Environmental sociology
- Ecology
- Sociology
- Psychology
- Social Psychology
- Bioecological model
- Ecosystem
- Ecosystem ecology
- Systems ecology
- Systems psychology
- Theoretical ecology
- Systems thinking
