= Stokols =

Stokols is a surname. Notable people with the surname include:

- Daniel Stokols (born 1948), American academic
- Eli Stokols (born 1978/1979), American journalist
- Stephen Stokols, American businessman
