= University of California, Irvine academics =

The University of California, Irvine has over fourteen academic divisions.

== Academics ==
=== Academic units ===
UC Irvine's academic units are referred to as Schools. As of the 2016-2017 school year, there are thirteen Schools. In addition, there is one Program and one Department not contained in a School, as well as various interdisciplinary programs. The College of Health Sciences was established in 2004, but no longer exists as a separate academic unit. On November 16, 2006, the UC Regents approved the establishment of the School of Law, with an expected opening in fall 2009. The School of Education was established by the Regents of the University of California in 2012. Supplementary education programs offer accelerated or community education in the form of Summer Session and UC Irvine Extension. Additionally, UCI's Campus wide Honors Program is implementing an independent study program, which will allow students to develop their own curriculum across Schools and graduate with their own self-created major. In 2016, the university announced that it had received a large donation from Bill Gross' philanthropic foundation to turn its nursing science program into the Sue and Bill Gross School of Nursing, which was approved in January 2017.

==== List of current units ====
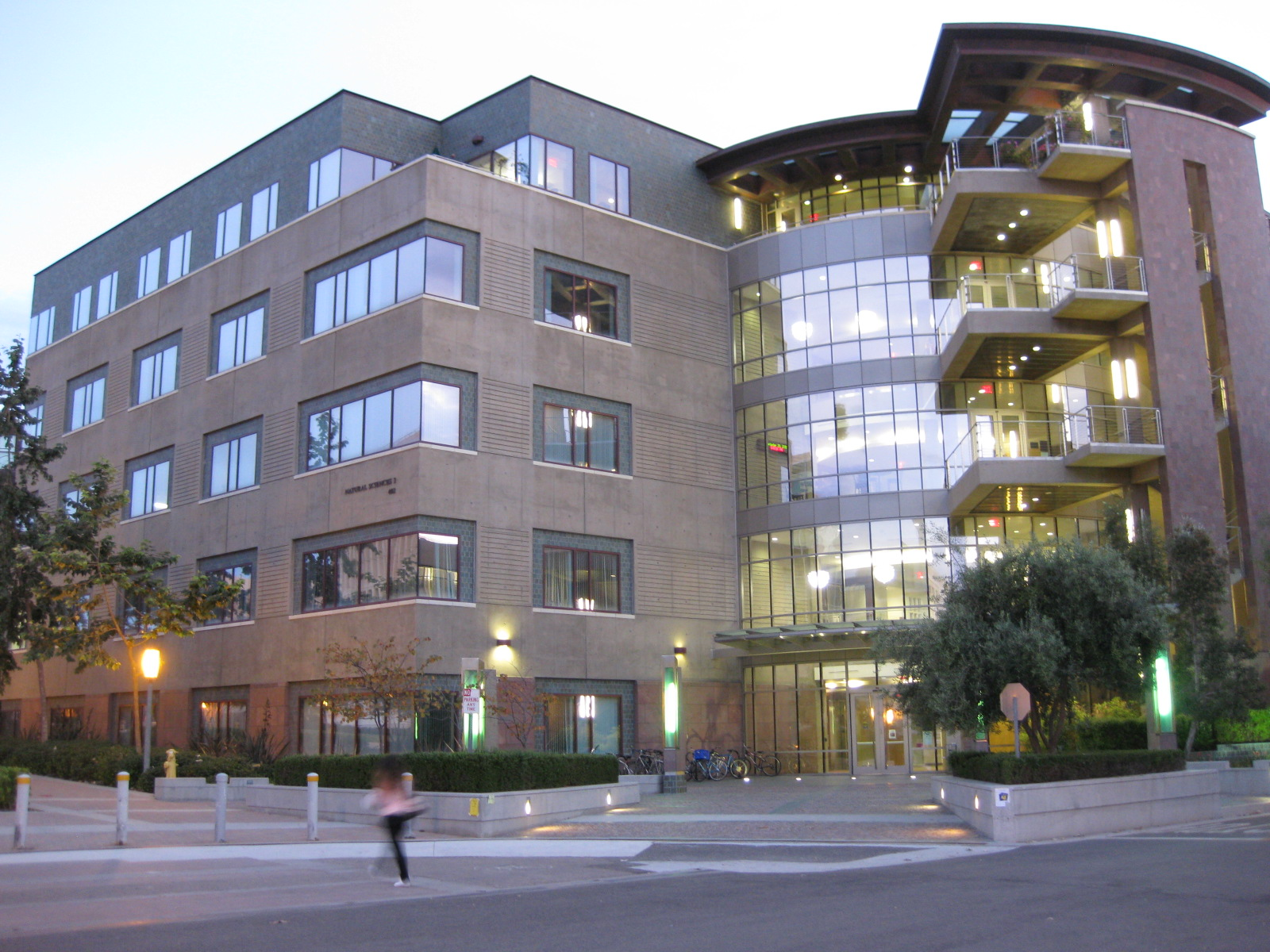
Natural Sciences II, School of Biological Sciences

A picture of the School of Social Sciences from Aldrich Park.

- Claire Trevor School of the Arts
- UCI School of Biological Sciences
- Paul Merage School of Business
- School of Education
- Henry Samueli School of Engineering
- School of Humanities
- Donald Bren School of Information and Computer Sciences
- School of Law
- School of Medicine
- Sue and Bill Gross School of Nursing
- School of Pharmacy & Pharmaceutical Sciences
- School of Physical Sciences
- Program in Public Health
- School of Social Ecology
- School of Social Sciences

=== Academic structure ===
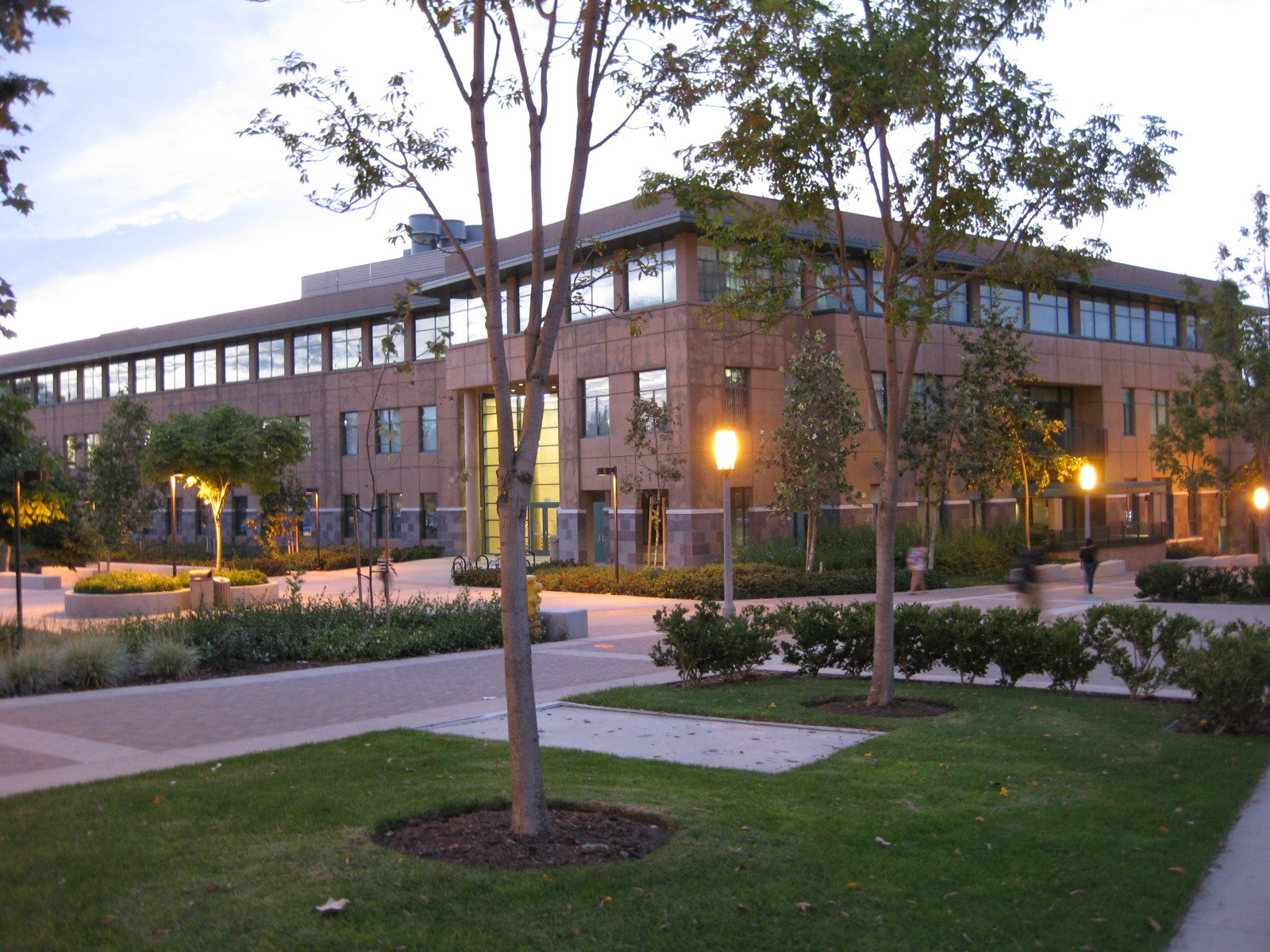
Biological Science III, School of Biological Sciences

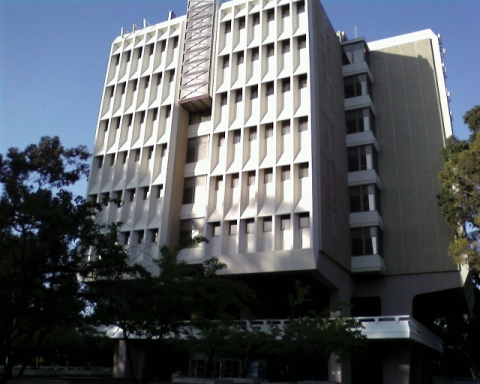
The Engineering Tower, located in the Henry Samueli School of Engineering, is the tallest building on campus.

UCI's academic year is divided into three quarters, each composed of ten weeks of instruction and one week of final examinations. The university requires a minimum of 12 units per quarter (about 3 classes) to be considered a full-time student, with the maximum being 20 units. The maximum amount of units can be exceeded by petition or by enrolment in the Campus wide Honors Program. The average UCI undergraduate takes four courses, or 16 units. Courses offered are usually worth between 1 and 5 quarter units. Summer courses are offered in either the quarter format of 11 weeks or two summer sessions of roughly half the time for a standard quarter.

UCI employs the traditional A-F grading scale and GPA system, modified for use with the quarter system. Students may elect to take a course for Pass/Not Pass credit, in which a passing grade offers units towards graduation without positively or adversely affecting a student's GPA. This option is often associated with courses that count for fewer than four units (for example, internship credit) or with courses a student wishes to take without the pressure of achieving a desired letter grade. Pass/Not Pass may be used for one course each quarter, with only 12 units counting towards graduation requirements.

In total, at least 180 quarter units are required to graduate. Most of the units come from the graduation requirements of an undergraduate's major, but a substantial amount also come from the general education requirement known as the "breadth requirement". The breadth requirement consists of seven subject categories:

1. Writing
2. Natural Sciences
3. Social and Behavioural Sciences
4. Humanistic Inquiry
5. Mathematics and Symbolic Systems
6. Language Other Than English
7. Multicultural Studies and International/Global Issues

The first category, Writing, is separated between lower-division writing (three courses) and upper-division writing (requiring the completion of a research project). The sixth category, Language Other Than English, can be fulfilled through four quarters of instruction (or more, depending on a student's major requirements). It may alternatively be satisfied by taking three years of a foreign language in high school, passing an AP test in a language other than English with a 4 or 5, or scoring a 620 or better on an SAT II exam in a language other than English. The seventh category, Multicultural Studies and International/Global Issues, contains two subcategories, Multicultural Studies and International/Global Issues. Category VII and the other categories not listed in detail here each require the completion of three courses from a series or subject area. Additionally, students may partially fulfil selected breadth requirements through petition or participation in extracurricular activities.

Of its 76 undergraduate majors, UCI's most popular ones are Biological Sciences (621 degrees awarded in the 2004-2005 academic year), Economics (417), Information & Computer Science (478) and Psychology and Social Behavior (324). UCI also hosts a diverse array of minors and certification programs. In 2005 the university awarded a total of 5,242 bachelor's degrees, 943 master's degrees, and 276 doctorates.

=== Rankings and distinctions ===
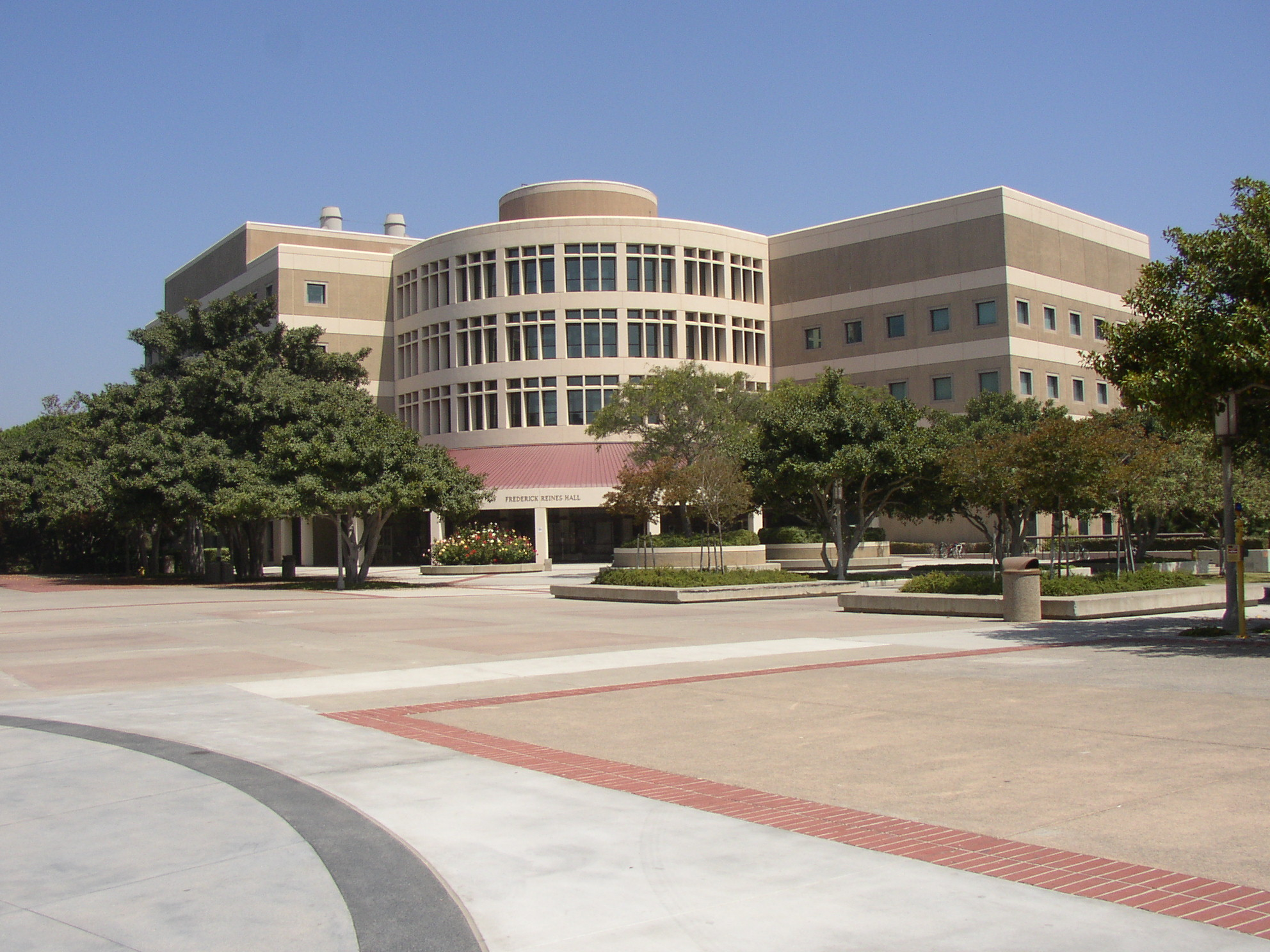
Frederick Reines Hall in the School of Physical Sciences, named after one of three UCI faculty members to receive the Nobel Prize.

In the 2008 U.S. News & World Report survey, UCI is ranked 5th among public universities in California (an honor that's shared with UC Santa Barbara), 13th among all public universities in the U.S., and 44th among all universities in the U.S., public or private.

UCI's graduate programs also receive top-50 rankings from U.S. News & World Report, earning distinction in literary criticism and theory (1), criminology (4), behavioral neuroscience (5), creative writing (6), health care management (9), organic chemistry (9), information systems (11), drama and theater (12), third-world literature (12), cognitive psychology (13), English (16), psychology – neurobiology and behavior (16), chemistry (18), experimental psychology (19), gender and literature (19), executive M.B.A. (20), cell biology/developmental biology (21), 19th- and 20th century literature (22), psychology – cognitive science (22), sociology (27), aerospace engineering (29), computer science (29), physics (29), mechanical engineering (30), civil engineering (31), biological sciences (32), history (32), environmental engineering (34), fine arts (34), political science (35), education (37), business (38), biomedical engineering (40), engineering (41), materials science engineering (45), economics (46), medicine (46), mathematics (47), psychology and social behavior (47), and electrical engineering (49).

UCI's Master of Fine Arts degree program in creative writing has graduated such authors as Richard Ford, Michael Chabon, and Alice Sebold. The graduate program in philosophy was ranked 17th in the English-speaking world by the Philosophical Gourmet Report, while Chemical and Engineering News ranks UCI fifth (tied with, among others, Harvard University) in conferring doctoral degrees in chemistry. The Wall Street Journal ranks UCI's Paul Merage School of Business fourth in the nation for information technology.

UC Irvine is a member of the Association of American Universities. As of 2006, in the Academic Ranking of World Universities by Shanghai Jiao Tong University’s Institute of Higher Education, UCI is ranked 34th in the U.S., 36th in the Americas and 44th in the world.

Three faculty have been named National Medal of Science recipients. Additionally, three researchers from UCI's faculty received the Nobel Prize during their tenure at UCI: Frank Sherwood Rowland (Chemistry, 1995), Frederick Reines (Physics, 1995) (deceased), and Irwin Rose (Chemistry, 2004). Dr. Rowland's Nobel-winning research was conducted exclusively at UC Irvine, along with fellow prize-winner Mario J. Molina. Irwin Rose received the Nobel Prize for his work on biological proteins. F. Sherwood Rowland is known for helping to discover CFCs and their harmful effects on the ozone layer, while Frederick Reines received the Nobel Prize for his work in discovering the neutrino. UCI is the first public university to have two Nobel laureates (Rowland and Reines) who received their prizes in the same year (1995).

UCI's faculty are also members of the following U.S. learned societies:

- American Academy of Arts and Sciences (39 members)
- American Association for the Advancement of Science (105 members)
- American Philosophical Society (7 members)
- American Physical Society (30 members)
- American Psychological Association (20 members)
- Institute of Medicine (5 members)
- National Academy of Engineering (8 members)
- National Academy of Sciences (22 members)

== Honors and research opportunities ==
=== Campuswide Honors Collegium ===
In 1988, UC Irvine founded the Campuswide Honors Program, which was promoted to Campuswide Honors Collegium in 2019, on the pillars of academics, community and support. In an effort to attract and retain academically gifted students at UCI, Campuswide Honors combines the "qualities of a liberal arts college with the unique opportunities offered by a major research university". The Campuswide Honors population includes students from all undergraduate majors and has grown with the UCI campus, maintaining a size 3% of UCI’s undergraduate population. Students are accepted into Campuswide Honors by invitation based on their UCI application or by applying as an undergraduate. Campuswide Honors students are entitled to many benefits that make the college experience more intellectually stimulating, fun, and convenient. Those who complete the honors requirements graduate with Campuswide Honors and are linked through an active alumni network. Campuswide Honors graduates have gone on to come of the most prestigious graduate and professional schools in the world.

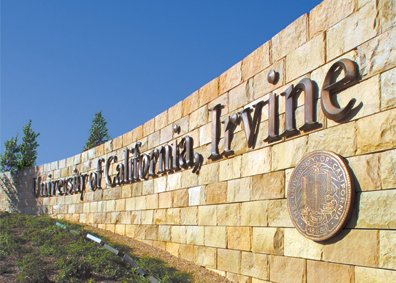
One of two identical UCI signs that face the main campus' Bison Avenue entrance.

One of the most significant Campuswide Honors requirements is the submission of an honors thesis, a long-term research project. An honors thesis may be completed either through independent study with a professor or one of the formal department honors programs on campus. These programs offer research seminars, grant application advising, and faculty mentor assistance, and confer department honors upon graduation. These programs, while separate from the Campuswide Honors Collegium, are administered by their respective academic units and open to all eligible undergraduates.

=== Scholarship Opportunities Program ===
An outgrowth of the CHP is the Scholarship Opportunities Program (SOP). SOP assists students interested in applying for scholarships. SOP emphasizes personal assistance with scholarship applications, but also offers students the opportunity to work towards merit and university scholarships, most of which are aimed at financing a research project or graduate education. UCI is a prolific producer of scholarship recipients, with students earning scholarships such as the Fulbright, Marshall, Truman, and National Science Foundation grants. UCI students also compete vigorously for UCI scholarships and research grants.

=== Undergraduate Research Opportunities Program ===
Many students who wish to complete an honors thesis, or other work of research, opt to participate in the Undergraduate Research Opportunities Program, which provides undergraduate students with the opportunity to gain valuable research experience. Better known on campus as UROP (pronounced you-ROP), the program provides funding and credit to undergraduate students who volunteer for faculty-mentored research projects pertaining to all academic disciplines. Launched in 1995, UROP has grown sharply in recent years and has received wide support from the faculty, including the active involvement of the UROP Faculty Advisory Board. Upon completion of the year-long research project, students are expected to present their findings at the school's research symposium.

Publication in the UROP Undergraduate Research Journal is known to be extremely competitive. Although not a requirement, some students may submit their written reports (ranging from 15-25 pages) to the faculty committee in order to be considered for publication in the university's research journals. In many cases, students are asked to submit numerous drafts to the faculty committee for review, only to find out that their papers are later denied publication. In the past, a mere 5% of all submissions were accepted for publication in the journal. UROP is comparable to similar programs at other large universities, such as the Massachusetts Institute of Technology, Boston University, and the University of Michigan.

=== Research organizations ===
To complement its mission as a research university, UCI hosts a diverse array of nationally and internationally recognized research organizations. These organizations are either chaired by or composed of UCI faculty, frequently draw upon undergraduates and graduates for research assistance, and produce a multitude of innovations, patents, and scholarly works. Some are housed in a school or department office; others are housed in their own multimillion-dollar facilities. These are a few of the more prolific research organizations at UCI:

- Beckman Laser Institute
- California Institute for Telecommunications and Information Technology (also known as Calit2)
- Center for Global Peace and Conflict Studies
- Center for Unconventional Security Affairs
- Chao Family Comprehensive Cancer Center
- National Fuel Cell Research Center
- Reeve-Irvine Research Center
- Center for the Study of Democracy
- Center for Health Policy Research

== Academic and professional preparation ==
=== Academic preparation programs ===
UCI is noted for offering 19 programs, collectively governed by the Center for Educational Partnerships (CFEP), that provide academic assistance for K-12 and college-age students. CFEP programs range from K-12 student development, college preparatory outreach, graduate/professional school development, and community outreach. UC Irvine offers other graduate and professional degree development programs also, such as the Alliance for Graduate Education and the Professoriate, UC-LEADS, Summer Academic Enrichment Program, and Student Academic Advancement Services.

Students interested in any major may participate in the SAGE Scholars Program, which offers extensive leadership and business training through courses, events, community service, and extracurricular activities. Additionally, it may provide up to an $8000 scholarship and an internship with a local company (for example Parker Hannifin, Broadcom, Allergan, Merrill Lynch). Another professional preparation program (for students interested in pursuing a career in law) is the UCI Law Forum. This certificate program offers courses, lectures, seminars, and extracurricular activities related to the legal profession. Like the SAGE Scholars Program, the Law Forum also allows students to develop advocacy, public speaking, and writing skills that are relevant both for academic and practical applications.

=== Internship programs ===
While most universities have internship programs, UC Irvine is unique in starting two internship programs that have become a mainstay for the whole University of California system. UC Irvine created the UCDC program in 1982 with four undergraduates; today, UCDC has nearly 50 UCI students in its summer program and maintains an equivalent academic year program. UCDC encourages students to seek internships in Washington, D.C., and houses them at the UC Washington Center. UCDC has since expanded to other UC campuses, with each campus administering their own summer and academic year programs. UC Irvine is also responsible for establishing the Sacramento Internship Program (SIP) in 2000. It is structurally similar to UCDC's summer program, but arranges for internships in the state capital and houses interns in a private apartment complex. SIP's academic year equivalent, the Scholar Intern Program, is administered by the UC Center Sacramento office.
