= Martha E. Bernal =

American psychologist (1931–2001)

- Born: April 13, 1931; San Antonio, Texas, U.S.
- Died: September 28, 2001 (aged 70); Black Canyon City, Arizona, U.S.
- Education: Texas Western College (UTEP), Syracuse University, Indiana University Bloomington
- Occupation: Clinical psychologist

Martha E. Bernal (April 13, 1931 – September 28, 2001) was an American clinical psychologist. She earned her doctoral degree at Indiana University Bloomington in 1962. She was the first Hispanic woman to receive a doctorate in psychology in the United States. Although Bernal's clinical work focused on the assessment and treatment of children with behavioral problems, she also developed organizations with a strong focus on minority ethnic groups.

== Childhood ==
Born to Mexican immigrants in San Antonio, Texas in 1931, Bernal was raised in Mexican culture while experiencing life as a Mexican American. At first her father, Enrique de Bernal, did not want her to continue her educational pursuits, but with the support of her older sister, Cristina, and her mother, Alicia, her father eventually relented. Initially, he was said to believe that "women were to be married and a college education for a woman was a waste", until he realized Martha's efforts and seriousness for her success.

== Education ==
Bernal began school in 1937 at a time when students at her school were prohibited from speaking Spanish. Additionally, she and her sisters were discouraged from taking academically advanced courses. Bernal recalled this environment as leading her to feel shame about her ethnicity and native tongue. Yet with reliance and sheer will, she eventually graduated, which was a significant accomplishment at the time due to Hispanic girls having high dropout rates.

In 1952, Bernal received a bachelor's degree from Texas Western College, which is now the University of Texas at El Paso. Later, she attended Syracuse University and graduated with a Master of Arts degree in 1955. Moving on to Indiana University, she struggled with sexism. While white men were welcome to conduct faculty-supervised research, women were denied such opportunities and often subject to sexual advances from professors. Bernal was ready to quit Indiana University until one of her teachers, Harry Yamaguchi, persuaded her to finish her doctorate. She eventually earned her doctorate in psychology with the additional support of other faculty members Roland C. Davis, Arnold Binder, and Leon. Bernal earned her degree during a time when less than 3% of doctorate degrees were being earned by Hispanic individuals.

== Work ==
After obtaining her doctoral degree from Indiana University in 1962, Bernal applied for various faculty jobs. This proved to be difficult for her as various institutions would reject her by openly stated that they, "do not hire women." Unable to get a faculty position, she obtained a U.S. Public Health Service Postdoctoral Fellowship at UCLA and conducted research for two years. Eventually, she became a faculty member at Arizona State University where she would study ethnic identity development among Mexican American children. She was able to conduct her research through a lab that a grant awarded to her in 1996 from the National Institute of Mental Health (NIMH) made possible to open. During this time she developed her interest in the behavioral principles and methods for the treatment of childhood psychopathology, mainly children with conduct disorders, as well as developed mechanisms used for measuring ethnic identity and the development of ethnic identity among Mexican American children. With her study on conduct disorders in children, Bernal focused on altering how parents respond to their children's behavior by teaching them skills that could later reverse the child's conduct. In this way, Bernal suggested conduct disorders in children were not inherited but instead learned from the environment that child finds themselves in. Eventually she became known nationally for displaying how behavioral interventions for children operate and the interventions' ability to operate over time, as well as for developing the Ethnic Identity Questionnaire. Bernal and her colleagues adapted the Ethnic Identity Questionnaire to measure ethnic identity development among young Mexican American children. She worked from 1964 to 1971 in the UCLA's Neuropsychiatric Institute developing behavioral interventions and then continued her work at the University of Denver from 1971 to 1986. Some of the interventions involved training parents by giving them lesson plans to help with their children's conduct problems.

Bernal's research on ethnic identity also examined how Mexican American children developed an understanding of their ethnic-group membership. In a 1990 study with George P. Knight and colleagues, she investigated the development of ethnic identity among Mexican American children, including children's ethnic self-identification, knowledge, preferences, and attitudes. The research contributed to a growing body of developmental psychology examining ethnicity as an important component of children's social and psychological development.

Bernal's work in applied behavior analysis also examined the use of behavioral interventions by parents. In 1978, Bernal and Juel Ann North reviewed 26 commercially available parent-training manuals intended for parents or professionals working with childhood behavior problems. They found that although many manuals adequately presented behavioral principles and procedures, relatively few had been empirically evaluated to determine whether their use resulted in measurable behavioral change. Bernal and North emphasized the importance of evaluating parent-training programs through direct measures of changes in both parent and child behavior rather than relying solely on consumer evaluations. This work reflected Bernal's broader emphasis on empirically evaluating behavioral interventions rather than assuming that commonly used clinical practices were effective.

In 1993, Bernal co-authored a book, Ethnic Identity: Formation and Transmission Among Hispanics and Other Ethnic Minorities.

== Legacy ==
Shortly after she started research in minority mental health, Bernal became the lead researcher on the topic of training minority psychologists. As a recipient of the NIMH National Research Service Award in 1979, Bernal published her research in American Psychologist and The Counseling Psychologist showing the paucity of courses in multicultural health and the gross underrepresentation of minority students and faculty across clinical psychology programs in the United States. Bernal advocated for the preparation of mental health professionals to provide services to the growth of ethnic minorities in the United States. Bernal was outspoken about the need to recruit and train more ethnic minorities in the field of psychology, and worked to incorporate specific organizations into the APA that had a focus on ethnic issues. Her research convinced many people in the APA to form the Board of Ethnic Minority Affairs (BEMA).

Bernal made numerous contributions to the field of psychology, and received several awards for her developments in pediatric clinical psychology as well as minority mental health. Informed by her personal experiences with structural and social prejudice, Bernal was instrumental in expanding access to care for minority groups and increasing recruitment of Hispanics into the field of psychology the United States. Among her awards, Bernal received the Distinguished Life Achievement Award from APA's Division 45, and APA's Distinguished Contribution to Psychology in the Public Interest Award in 2001. She also contributed much to the establishment of the National Hispanic Psychology Association, now known as the National Latino Psychological Association, where she became the second president and eventually the treasurer. One of Bernal's most notable accomplishments was the education and mentoring of numerous students. She helped her students navigate issues that she herself had struggled with throughout her life and academic career. Today, several scholarships have been created in her name to offset the costs of higher education for minority students, with a particular focus on women. One includes a scholarship from Arizona State University, where she sponsored a symposium on Ethnic Identity. She wanted to help students have equal opportunities for advancement in psychology. She has gained extensive acknowledgments from the people she has interacted with, becoming an inspiration to many of her followers and peers.

Bernal also examined the preparation of clinical psychologists to work with ethnic-minority populations. In a 1982 study with psychologist Amado M. Padilla, she examined minority-related curricula and training in clinical psychology programs. Their work documented limitations in training related to ethnic-minority populations as well as the underrepresentation of ethnic-minority students and faculty within psychology training programs. Bernal and Padilla argued for increased attention to culturally relevant education, recruitment, and training within clinical psychology.

More than a decade later, Bernal and Felipe G. Castro revisited the issue in a 1994 study of clinical psychology training. They reported evidence of progress while also identifying continuing limitations in the preparation of psychologists for research and service with ethnic-minority populations.

On April 13, 2024, a Google Doodle was posted to celebrate “the 93rd birthday of Mexican American psychologist, Dr. Martha Bernal”.

== Death ==
In her later years, Bernal battled cancer and was eventually forced to stop her work due to declining health. However, she continued to be an influential leader by working with the APA's Commission on Ethnic Minority Recruitment, Retention and Training (CEMRRAT) and the Committee on Gay, Lesbian, and Bisexual Affairs, remaining an active member until her death. After recovering from cancer three times, she was diagnosed with lung cancer and died at the age of 70 on September 28, 2001.
