= Ecological counseling =

Counseling method

Ecological counseling is a form of pastoral counseling which is dependent on the meaning clients derive from their interactions with their own environment. It is an approach that integrates personal and environmental factors to conceptualize human issues by focusing on their interaction. By doing so, divergent forces that converge through the development of human life can be organized into a logical and coherent narrative. This process attempts to assist people in recreating their lives, similar to various forms of counseling.

Ecological counseling seeks to understand people's ecological niches and assist them to live a satisfying life. This is accomplished by improving one's interactional quality, or concordance, through counseling intervention at both the personal and environmental levels.

The theoretical structure of this approach emerges from the integration of field theory, phenomenology, and constructivism. In 1935, Kurt Lewin, a German Gestalt psychologist, articulated that human behavior is a product of personal and environmental factors and formulated the equation B=(PxE). Urie Bronfenbrenner expanded Lewin's work in 1979 into Ecological Systems Theory. Ecological counseling posits that the person is inextricably situated within radically specific and interdependent ecological systems. Additionally, the individual carries particular capacities, limitations, temperaments, preferences, symbolic representation systems, and personal historicity through the varying environmental settings in which the person lives. The interactions between the person and environment result in the construction of individual ecological niches. These niches are what one experiences as their world.

Ecological counseling has implications for clinical counseling practice, counselor training, group work, career counseling, social service delivery, research, social justice initiatives, community intervention, consultation, supervision, and human growth & development.

== See also ==
- Ecological psychology
- List of counseling topics
