= University of California, Irvine School of Social Ecology =

School of the University of California, Irvine

Coordinates: 33.6463°N 117.839°W

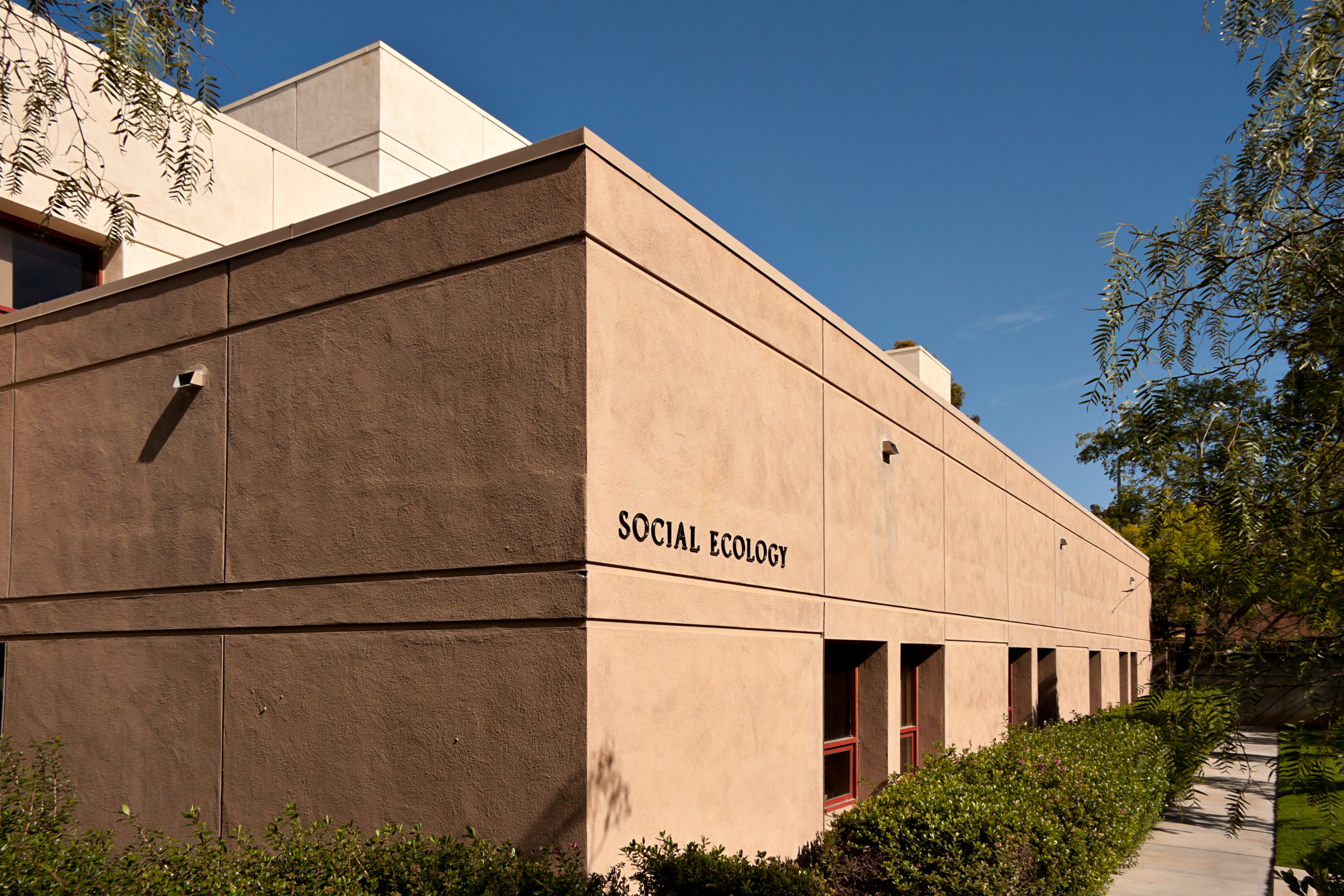
- Social Ecology I building.
- Former name: Program in Social Ecology
- Type: School
- Established: 1970 (as a program); 1992 (as a school)
- Parent institution: University of California, Irvine
- Dean: Jon Gould
- Location: Irvine, California, United States
- Website: socialecology.uci.edu

The University of California, Irvine School of Social Ecology (SSE) is a school at the University of California, Irvine (UCI) that focuses on social ecology. Students in SSE at UCI undergo a multidisciplinary program that examines real-world social and environmental issues, involves the students in off-campus internships and SSE offers undergraduate and graduate degrees, including bachelor's, professional master's, and Ph.D.s.

The school has three departments: Criminology, Law and Society; Psychological Science (prior to Fall 2019 known as Psychology and Social Behavior); and Urban Planning and Public Policy. It is also home to approximately 70 faculty, 2,500 undergraduate students, 300 graduate students, and over 20,000 alumni; it offers five undergraduate degrees and eight graduate degrees, including two professional degrees. It is the third-largest school at UCI by population.

== History ==
In 1970, SSE was founded as the first US academic unit in social ecology. Founded by Arnold Binder, the program intended to address social problems of the day by promoting research and training that crossed disciplinary boundaries and held direct relevance to public policy and social issues. The program also encouraged students to apply theory and research to the study of community issues by emphasizing hands-on, cross-disciplinary research, education, and training. Since the beginning of the program in 1970, all undergraduate students in the program have been required to take field study internships with a community organization in order to graduate.

In 1988, UCI began the process to accord School status to the program. In 1992, the University of California Regents formally approved SSE.

In the following decades, SSE continued to expand its offerings and infrastructure. In 1993, the school established the Department of Urban Planning and Public Policy and began awarding master's degrees in Urban and Regional Planning. A second social ecology building on campus opened in 1996, the same year that new Ph.D. programs in Urban and Regional Planning and Environmental Health Science and Policy were approved by the Academic Senate. In 2003, the Urban and Regional planning department and Ph.D. program were renamed "Planning, Policy and Design" (PPD). In 2009, PPD inaugurated an undergraduate major, a B.A. in Urban Studies. In 2011, PPD helped launch a Master's of Public Policy degree. SSE faculty were also involved in launching UCI's public health program and law school.

The American Psychological Society Observer lauded the Department of Psychological Science as "one of the most successful interdisciplinary arenas in the field and a good example of a growing trend in behavioral research". The Urban Planning and Public Policy department ranked at the top of measures of productivity in a 2012 Planetizen survey of 372 planning educators from accredited planning schools.

== Academics ==
Core courses introduce B.A., M.A., and Ph.D. Social Ecology students to integrative concepts and methods drawn from systems theory and ecology, while also emphasizing the value of applying multiple disciplinary perspectives to the analysis of community problems. Students are both trained in research skills and prepared for community-oriented jobs.

The School is organized into three departments. The department of criminology and law and society focuses on "the social, political, economic and cultural factors that lead to the development of law and explain the structure of our legal system". The psychological science department researches "developmental, social, personality, health, and legal aspects of psychology as well as biological, clinical, cultural, community, environmental, and ecological psychology". Finally, the department of planning, policy and design studies the areas and intersections of the natural environment, the built community and public policy. The department is especially centered on the intersection of these three fields.

SSE's faculty include Elizabeth Loftus, known for her expertise on false memories.

SSE offers majors in Criminology, Law and Society; Psychology and Social Behavior; Social Ecology; and Urban Studies Planning and Policy(Formerly known as Urban Studies), as well as various minors in a variety of topics relating to the population and their impact on society. The field study curriculum requires all undergraduate Social Ecology students to complete internships at local sites to encourage experiential learning and community-engaged scholarship. Graduate degrees include master's degrees in urban and regional planning, public policy (jointly with the School of Social Sciences) and criminology, law & society, as well as PhDs in Social Ecology; Criminology, Law and Society; Planning, Policy and Design; and Psychology and Social Behavior.

=== Research centers ===
SSE research centers focus on institutional, legal, political, environmental, and social issues. SSE's centers include the Center for Evidence-Based Corrections, Community Outreach Partnership Center, Center for Psychology and Law, Center for Unconventional Security Affairs, and the Newkirk Center for Science and Society. In addition, the School partners with other units on campus for interdisciplinary research centers, such the Center in Law, Society and Culture (in partnership with the Schools of Humanities and Social Sciences) and the Center for Organizational Research (with the Schools of Social Sciences, Business, and Information and Computer Sciences).

== See also ==
- University of California, Irvine academics
