= Social systems theory =

Social systems theory may refer to one of the following theories:

- Niklas Luhmann's theory of social systems
- Actor–network theory, a theoretical and methodological approach to social theory where everything in the social and natural worlds exists in constantly shifting networks of relationships
- Conflict theories, perspectives in political philosophy and sociology that argue that individuals and groups within society interact on the basis of conflict rather than agreement
- Network theory, the study of graphs as a representation of relations between discrete objects
- Ecological systems theory, a theory in developmental psychology
- Social network analysis, the analysis of social structures using network and graph theory
- Structural functionalism, a theoretical framework for constructing theories that views society as an intricate system where its components collaborate to foster unity and stability
- Symbolic interactionism, a sociological theory focused on cultural symbols exchanged during interpersonal interactions
- Systems theory, a transdisciplinary study of systems
- World-systems theory, an approach emphasizing the world-system as the primary unit of social analysis
