= Social ecology (academic field) =

Study of relationships between people and their environment

Social ecology is the study of how people engage with, respond to, and impact their environment. Early social ecology existed within the frameworks of biological ecology, human ecology, systems theory, and ecological psychology, examining people-environment relationships through the lens of "biological processes and geographic environment." Modern social ecology merges this old framework with novel systems focusing on the role of social, psychological, institutional, and cultural contexts. This has enabled multidisciplinary study into the health of communities and individuals. Social ecology has been employed to study a diverse array of social problems and policies within the behavioral and social sciences.

== Conceptual Framework ==
The 1970s and 1980s saw increased public awareness of the social role in the establishment of disease as well as a rising interest in disease prevention and health promotion. In 1996, Research Professor Daniel Stokols established six guidelines for effective utilization of social ecology in the promotion of community health, a direct response to this emerging field:

1. Examine Links between Multiple Facets of Well-being and Diverse Conditions of the Sociophysical Environment
2. Consider Joint Influence of Intrapersonal and Environmental Conditions on Individual and Community Well-being
3. Develop Health Promotion Programs that Enhance the Fit Between People and Their Surroundings
4. Focus Health Promotive Interventions on High-Impact Behavioral and Organizational "Leverage Points"
5. Design Health Promotion Programs that Address Interdependencies Between the Physical and Social Environment and Encompass Multiple Settings and Life Domains
6. Integrate Multidisciplinary Perspectives in the Design of Health Promotion Programs and Use Multiple Methods to Gauge Scientific and Social Validity of Interventions

Four years after Stokols made his proposal, Gryzwacz and Fuqua established four leverage points that they deemed wielded a "disproportionate amount of influence" on critical health outcomes. These leverage points are the following:

1. Socioeconomic Status
2. The Family
3. Employment and Work
4. School

Socioeconomic status is "consistently linked to health status and mortality across cultures and time;" however, individuals with a strong sense of control could reduce the severity of this detriment. Family structure provides positive financial and social benefits, reducing negative-health outcomes. Beliefs about individual health within collective family units can be passed down to individuals. As most adults work full-time, physical, social, and psychological aspects of their job condition their willingness to "adhere to medical treatment" and "health promotion interventions". The same holds true for students, where physical environmental dangers, social controls, peer groups, and academic pressure can influence long-term health outcomes. Future social ecology models and health treatments were heavily advised to consider these four factors for maximum effectiveness.

== Philosophy and ethics ==
American environmental activist Murray Bookchin introduced the idea of social ecology. He makes the case that environmentalists should be less concerned with addressing the idea that humans can and should manage nature, and more with focusing on the specific symptoms of a problem. Social ecology was built on top of this philosophy. According to Bookchin, society's divisions are detrimental to it as a whole, Human-made hierarchies are the root cause of all social and environmental problems and dysfunctions in human society. Bookchin thought that society and life should be viewed as an ecosystem, where all the components are equally vital to a stable, healthy, and sustainable environment, as opposed to a hierarchy.

Murray Bookchin contends that rather than existing outside of nature, humans are a part of it. Bookchin distinguished between two types of nature: the first, or biotic, and the second, or human. For Bookchin, nature in its whole is an ever-evolving evolutionary process rather than a static condition like a breathtaking panorama. Not only the human organism but also human civilization is the product of this continuous evolutionary endeavor. It is not the intention of human reason or social structure to be freak mutations apart from the rest of nature. Rather, they are designed to interact with nature and advance its evolution in ways that other species cannot. Humans can assume their proper place in the ecosystem if the desire for supremacy is subdued. In a nutshell, Bookchin lays out the fundamental political framework that would enable this: a global order devoid of nation states, where political life is centered around towns linked by weak institutions that forbid them from taking advantage of one another. These municipalities would foster a real type of citizenship where the barriers between individual and group interests, as well as between human and ecological interests, would be eliminated. They would also naturally become part of their local ecosystems.

Bookchin's main advantage is that he provides strong arguments for why people should care about ecology in addition to self-preservation. The idea of "biocentrism," which prioritizes the needs of the environment over human needs and views humans as having equal value with non humans, and "anthropocentrism," which places an absolute emphasis on human interests, are two main points of contention in environmental ethics. Biocentrism is predicated on the idea that humans and the rest of nature are identical, whereas anthropocentrism is predicated on the idea that humans are superior to and distinct from nature. According to Bookchin, although being distinct from the rest of nature, people are nevertheless an essential component of it. Thus, in his opinion, neither biocentrism nor anthropocentrism is sufficient. This is particularly fascinating because it eliminates any notions that humans are completely separated from the natural world, allowing humanity to still recognize something unique about itself and find value in civilization and technological advancement. It also instills a sense of duty towards the natural world.

It is thought that if these values are applied to every aspect of society, there will be more equality and cooperation and hierarchies won't determine who wins and who loses. An essential component of a competent social worker's perspective is appreciating the significance of each "piece" to the system as a whole.

=== Relationship to similar philosophies ===
==== Communalism ====
Social ecology promotes autonomous individual communities built on mutual assistance and cooperation, but Bookchin set himself apart from communalism by stressing decentralization and participatory democracy. This form of democratic deliberation promotes autonomy and self-reliance rather than centralized state politics.

==== Marxism ====
Social class and power dynamics are the main lenses through which social ecology views society. Bookchin, however, took issue with Marxism's primary focus on economic inequality and its disregard for ecological issues.

==== Environmentalism ====
Concern for the environment and the necessity of sustainable practices are shared by social ecology and environmentalism. Social ecology goes beyond conventional environmentalism, however, contending that social problems such as inequality, dominance, and hierarchy cannot be solved in a vacuum when it comes to ecological issues.

=== Deep ecology ===
Deep ecology and social ecology promote a biocentric worldview and highlight the inherent value of nature. Bookchin, however, criticizes deep ecology for frequently focusing on individualistic solutions rather than taking into account the social causes of environmental problems.

=== Anarchism ===
Anarchism and social ecology are both movements that support individual and collective autonomy while criticizing hierarchical power structures. Bookchin, however, was not in agreement with many anarchists regarding the significance of democratic decision-making and social organization.

== Academic programs ==
Several academic programs combine a broad definition of "environmental studies" with analyses of social processes, biological considerations, and the physical environment. A number of social ecology degree-granting programs and research institutes shape the global evolution of the social ecological paradigm. Examples include:

- College of the Atlantic
- UC Irvine School of Social Ecology
- Yale School of Forestry & Environmental Studies
- Cornell University College of Human Ecology
- New York University, Environmental Education
- The Institute for Social Ecology in Plainfield, VT
- The Institute for Social-Ecological Research, Frankfurt
- Institute of Social Ecology, Vienna
- Stockholm Resilience Centre

Most of the 120 programs listed by the Society of Human Ecology(linked below) focus on human ecology, although many overlap with social ecology.

- Society for Human Ecology list of programs and institutions

== See also ==
- Murray Bookchin#Social ecology
- Social ecological model
- Ecology
- Environmental stewardship
