= Joan Petersilia =

American criminologist and academic (1951–2019)

- Born: Joan Ramme; January 2, 1951; Pittsburgh, Pennsylvania, U.S.
- Died: September 23, 2019 (aged 68); Santa Barbara, California, U.S.
- Education: Loyola Marymount University (B.A., 1972); Ohio State University (M.A., 1974); University of California, Irvine (Ph.D., 1990)
- Alma mater: Loyola Marymount University
- Awards: 2014 Stockholm Prize in Criminology, received an honorary Doctor of Public Policy by the Frederick S. Pardee RAND Graduate School (also in 2014)
- Scientific career
- Fields: Criminology; Criminal law
- Institutions: Stanford University
- Thesis: Intensive supervision probation for high-risk offenders: findings from three California experiments (1990)
- Doctoral advisor: Arnold Binder

Joan Ramme Petersilia (January 2, 1951 – September 23, 2019) was an American criminologist and the Adelbert H. Sweet Professor of Law at Stanford Law School, as well as the faculty co-director of the Stanford Criminal Justice Center.

== Education ==
Petersilia received her B.A. from Loyola Marymount University in 1972 in sociology, her M.A. from Ohio State University in 1974, also in sociology, and her Ph.D. from the University of California, Irvine in criminology, law & society in 1990.

== Career ==
Petersilia began working for the RAND Corporation in 1974, and remained there until 1994. She joined the faculty of the University of California, Irvine in 1992 as a professor of criminology, law and society, and in 2005, she became the founding director of the Center on Evidence-Based Corrections there. She joined the faculty of Stanford Law School in 2009. She was a founding co-editor of the journal the Annual Review of Criminology.

== Research ==
Petersilia researched prisoner reentry for over three decades.

== Honors, awards and positions ==
For her research into prisoner reentry and the process of reintegrating released prisoners into society, Petersilia, along with Daniel Nagin, was awarded the 2014 Stockholm Prize in Criminology. Also that year, she received an honorary Doctor of Public Policy from the Frederick S. Pardee RAND Graduate School. She also served as president of the American Society of Criminology and the Association of Criminal Justice Research in California. She was also a fellow of the American Society of Criminology and the recipient of its Vollmer Award.

== Death ==
Petersilia died on September 23, 2019, from ovarian cancer. She had retired for health reasons a year earlier.

Professional and academic associations
Preceded by Joan McCord	President of the American Society of Criminology; 1990	Succeeded by John L. Hagan
