= Arnold Binder =

American sociologist

- Other name: Arnie Binder
- Education: Stanford University
- Known for: Juvenile delinquency
- Awards: Fellows Award from the Western Society of Criminology (1988-89)
- Scientific career
- Fields: Sociology; Criminology
- Workplaces: University of California, Irvine
- Thesis: An Investigation of Differential Decrement in the Intelligence of Schizophrenics (1953)
- Notable students: Joan Petersilia; Daniel Stokols

Arnold Binder was an American sociologist, criminologist, and Professor Emeritus of Criminology, Law & Society at the University of California, Irvine, where he founded the School of Social Ecology in 1970.

== Career ==
He had previously outlined a roadmap for the School and successfully persuaded UC-Irvine's administrators to create it. In this effort he was supported by Daniel Aldrich, UC-Irvine's chancellor at the time, who supported the School because of the connection between social ecology and the higher-education ideal of public service. He was vice chair and chair of the University of California's Academic Council from 1992–94 and chair of the Irvine division from 1995–98. He received the Oliver Johnson Award from the University of California Academic Senate in 2002. He also founded and initially led the Community Service Programs (originally called the Youth Services Program), a child intervention project in Southern California, in 1972. He is known for his work on juvenile delinquency, including the 1988 college textbook Juvenile Delinquency: Historical, Cultural, Legal Perspectives, which he co-authored with Gilbert Geis and Dickson Bruce. He has also researched hate crimes and the use of deadly force by police.

== Death ==
Binder died on October 2, 2021, at the age of 97.
