= Murray Krieger =

American literary critic (1923–2000)

- Born: November 27, 1923; Newark, New Jersey, US
- Died: August 5, 2000 (aged 76)

Academic background
- Education: University of Chicago; Ohio State University

Academic work
- Discipline: literary criticism
- School or tradition: New Criticism
- Institutions: University of Minnesota; University of Iowa; University of California, Irvine

Murray Krieger (November 27, 1923 – August 5, 2000) was an American literary critic and theorist. He was a professor at the University of Minnesota, the University of Iowa from 1963, and then the University of California, Irvine. In 1999, the University of California, Irvine dedicated a building, Murray Krieger Hall, to Krieger in recognition of his contributions to the school.

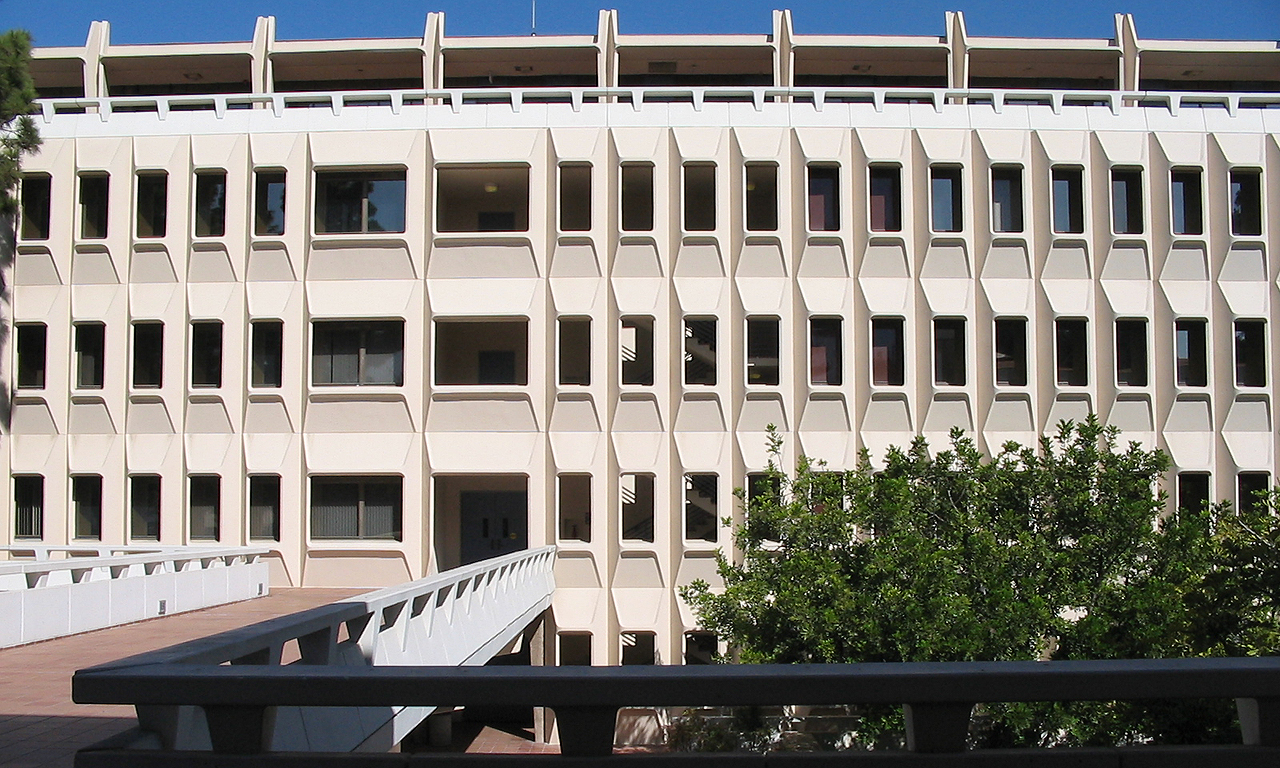
Murray Krieger Hall in the UC Irvine School of Humanities.

He was born in Newark, New Jersey. His older brother was historian Leonard Krieger. He served in World War II before studying at the University of Chicago, and Ohio State University as a doctoral student. One of the major New Critics, in 1976, he helped found the School of Criticism and Theory, which became an influential forum for literary criticism and critical theory in the United States. His study of the New Critics introduced a degree of philosophical sophistication and theoretical self-consciousness to formalist criticism that was rare among literary critics in the U.S. during that time.

Krieger's work focused on the nature of literary fiction and how it reveals the constructed nature of all forms of representation. According to him, literature is the "primary means of freeing ourselves from the constraints of ideology and arbitrary beliefs." He insisted that literature is different from other kinds of discourse because it never claims its fictional forms are anything other than illusions. Krieger argued that literary illusion, as illusion, offers society a critical perspective on the ideological systems by which beliefs are nourished and enforced as “true,” and he included among those systems any theoretical method that discounts the special status of literary forms. Consequently, in an ironic reversal of the revolution he had helped bring about, Krieger spent the last two decades of his career arguing for the importance of literature to the study of theory.

He received numerous awards and honors during his lifetime, including membership in the American Academy of Arts and Sciences (1983), the Humboldt Prize (1985), the UCI Medal (1990), and the Daniel G. Aldrich Award for Distinguished University Service (1993). Following his retirement in 1994, he was appointed University Research Professor, and in that capacity he continued to write, teach, and lecture around the world until his death six years later.

== Works ==
- The New Apologists for Poetry (1956)
- The Tragic Vision (1960)
- The Problems of Aesthetics: A Book of Readings (1963) with Eliseo Vivas
- A Window to Criticism (1964)
- Northrop Frye in Modern Criticism (1966) editor
- Play and Place of Criticism (1967)
- The Classic Vision: The Retreat from Extremity in Modern Literature (1971)
- Literature and History (1974) with Ralph Cohen
- Theory of Criticism: A Tradition and Its System (1976)
- Directions for Criticism: Structuralism & its Alternatives (1977) editor with L. S. Dembo
- Poetic Presence & Illusion: Essays in Critical History & Theory (1979)
- Arts on the Level (1981)
- Words about Words about Words: Theory, Criticism & the Literary Text (1988)
- A Reopening of Closure (1989)
- Ekphrasis (1992)
- Aims of Representation: Subject, Text, History (1993) editor
- The Institution of Theory (1994)
