= Stephen J. Ceci =

American psychologist

Stephen J. Ceci is a professor of developmental psychology at Cornell University. He studies the accuracy of children's courtroom testimony (as it applies to allegations of physical abuse, sexual abuse, and neglect), and he is an expert in the development of intelligence and memory. He has been the recipient of numerous awards, including lifetime contribution awards from the American Psychological Association (APA) and the Association for Psychological Science (APS) as well as many divisional and smaller society awards.

== Personal life ==
Stephen J. Ceci was born in Wilmington, Delaware, on March 22, 1950. He was the fourth of six children born to Italian parents. Ceci attended Catholic school until college. During childhood, he preferred playing sports and running around the neighborhood to attending school. As a teenager, Ceci worked as a numbers runner for a local bookie, where he became famous for his memory.

== Education ==
Stephen Ceci attended the University of Delaware on a scholarship from the school and graduated with a B.A. in psychology in 1973. He got his M.A. in developmental psychology from the University of Pennsylvania in 1975. He received in Ph.D. in developmental psychology from the University of Exeter, in England, in 1978. During his time at the University of Exeter, Ceci was mentored by Michael Howe, with whom he continued to work until Howe died in 2002. Their work together included: "Structural Analysis of Memory Traces in Children from 4 to 10 Years of Age" and "Semantic Knowledge as a Determinant of Developmental Differences in Recall".

== Career ==
After graduating from the University of Exeter, Ceci worked for the University of North Dakota as an assistant professor. He continued to work there until 1980 when he was hired by Cornell University. He is the Helen L. Carr Chaired Professor of Developmental Psychology for Cornell's College of Human Ecology. His research includes the study of children and the law, women and science, and intellectual development. In his studies in children and the law, he focuses his research on suggestibility, competency to testify, deception, and coerced confessions. His studies in women and science involve sexual discrimination and hiring, mentoring, and stereotyping. His work in intellectual development includes cross-cultural influences, schooling, intelligence, cognitive sexual differences, and achievement gaps.

Ceci introduced, in 1990, his "bio-ecological theory of intelligence". Later, in 1995, Ceci would then become a part of an 11-member American Psychological Association task force led by Ulric Neisser which published "Intelligence: Knowns and Unknowns", a report written in response to The Bell Curve.

He leads the Cornell Child Witness and Cognition Lab, one of the Lifespan Labs hosted by the Department of Psychology. This lab researches the connection of child psychology and the law by focusing on four key topics: child development, cognition and law, social psychology and the law, intellectual development, and select professional issues. This lab allows graduate and undergraduate students opportunities to get involved in research on legal issues that coincide with childhood development.

His professional expertise includes a broad spectrum of fields. One subject area that stands out in his career, is his research on women's under representation in science. This research has been praised by many commentaries, and his book The Mathematics of Sex has received endorsements from Diane Halpern, David Lubinski, Christina Hoff Sommers, Frank Farley, and Marcia Linn.

Ceci's article (co-written with Maggie Bruck), "The Suggestibility of Child Witnesses", won the 1994 Robert Chin Memorial Award for the most outstanding article on child abuse. His book (co-written with Maggie Bruck), "Jeopardy in the Courtroom: A Scientific Analysis of Children's Testimony", on the credibility of children's testimony in child abuse trials, received the 2000 William James Award for Excellence in Psychology. In 2003 Ceci received the American Psychological Association Award for Distinguished Scientific Applications of Psychology.

Awards and achievements
Date	Presenting organization	Award title
2000	American Academy of Forensic Psychology	Lifetime Distinguished Contribution Award
2002	American Psychological Association: Division of Developmental Psychology	Urie Bronfenbrenner Award for Lifetime Contribution to Developmental Psychology in the Service of Science and Society
2003	American Psychological Association	Distinguished Scientific Contribution Award for the Application of Psychology (Awarded alongside Elizabeth F. Loftus)
2005	Association for Psychological Science	James McKeen Cattell Fellow Award
2013	The Society for Research in Child Development	Senior Distinguished Contributions Award (Awarded alongside Judy DeLoache and Michael Lewis)
2014	American Psychological Association	E. L. Thorndike Award
2018	American Psychological Association	G. Stanley Hall Award for Distinguished Contributions to Developmental Psychology

=== In the media ===
Stephen Ceci has been seen on many forms of media, including: ABC 20/20, NBC Dateline NBC, ABC Nightline, ABC Good Morning America, ABC Primetime, CBS 48 Hours, PBS McNeil-Lehrer NewsHour, BBC, CBC Fifth Estate, Wall Street Journal, New York Times, New Yorker, Washington Post Time, Newsweek, London Times, and Reader's Digest.

=== Advisory board ===
- Was on the board of editorial advisors of the APA from 1993 to 1995
- Was on the Canadian Institute of Advanced Research from 1995 to 2003
- Was on the National Academy of Sciences' Board on Cognitive, Behavioral and Sensory Sciences from 1997 to 2007
- Was a member of the White House Commission on Children from 2002 to 2004
- Was on the board of the Journal of Applied Psychology from 2002 to 2006
- Was on the National Science Foundation Advisory Board on Social, Economic, and Behavioral Sciences before its termination on April 15, 2025
- Was on The National Research Council's SERP (Strategic Educational Research and Planning Committee)
- Was on the board of the past president of the APA (American Psychological Association) Society of Experimental Psychology and Cognitive Science
- Was the past president of the Society for General Psychology

He is the founding co-editor of Psychological Science in the Public Interest, published by APS.

He served on over 20 journals' editorial boards, as well as a senior advisor to several journals.

He holds a lifetime endowed chair in developmental psychology at Cornell.

== Research ==
Stephen J. Ceci, a developmental psychologist, is best known for his groundbreaking research on the reliability of courtroom testimonies made by children and the legal implications regarding cognitive development. His work has shaped how courts evaluate child witnesses, advocated for reforms in interviewing protocols, and raised awareness about how susceptible children are to suggestion and false memories. While Ceci has explored cognitive development more broadly, he has also extended his research to issues around gender differences in science, examining how stereotypes and hiring biases contribute to the under representation of women in STEM fields.

In 1990, Ceci introduced the "Bio-Ecological Theory of Intelligence", which holds that the level of mental activities or IQ are dependent on context. For example, he says traditional conceptions of intelligence ignore the role of society in shaping intelligence and underestimate the intelligence of non-Western societies. Additionally, in collaboration with Wendy M. Williams, he worked on a project that focuses on how cognitive performances differ between men and women. One study in particular earned acclaim for finding evidence that suggests that faculty prefer to hire women professors over equally qualified men.

Ceci's research on children and the law has significantly influenced the way that the legal system evaluates a child's testimony. His studies suggest that children are highly suggestible and that certain interviewing techniques can inadvertently lead to false memories. In another collaboration with psychologist Maggie Bruck, Ceci's work has moved beyond theory and has been implemented in real world scenarios, such as informing courtroom procedures and influencing judicial decisions. Notably, their findings have been cited by appellate judges when assessing the reliability of child witnesses, which emphasizes the real-world impact of their research on legal standards.

== See also ==
- Bioecological model
