= Eli Stokols =

American journalist

- Born: 1978 or 1979 (age 46–47)
- Education: University of California, Berkeley; Columbia University Graduate School of Journalism
- Occupation: Journalist
- Spouse: Elena Cecilia Schneider
- Parent(s): Jeannette J. Stokols; Daniel S. Stokols

Eli Stokols (born 1978/1979) is an American journalist. He is currently a White House reporter for POLITICO.

== Early life and education ==
Stokols was born into a Jewish family, the son of Jeannette J. Stokols and Daniel S. Stokols. He grew up in Irvine, California where his family were members of the Reconstructionist University Synagogue. He graduated from University High School in Irvine in 1997. He later graduated from the University of California, Berkeley. While there, he pitched for the Cal baseball team. He subsequently received an M.S. degree from the Columbia University Graduate School of Journalism in 2002.

== Career ==
He is currently a White House reporter for POLITICO. Previously a White House reporter for the Los Angeles Times , he covered the 2016 presidential campaign for The Wall Street Journal. He joined the WSJ's Washington bureau in March 2017. He previously worked as a national reporter for Politico. He joined Politico in the spring of 2016. Prior to that, he covered Colorado politics for nearly a decade at KDVR, and its sister station KWGN-TV, in Denver, Colorado. While in Denver, he hosted, #COpolitics: From the Source, a weekly interview show. In 2013 and 2014, he wrote for 5280 magazine.

== Personal life ==
Stokols' first marriage ended in divorce. On September 15, 2018, he married Elena Cecilia Schneider in an interfaith ceremony at the Augsburg Lutheran Church in Winston-Salem, N.C. They met in 2015 at Politico, where they both worked at the time.
