= Ecological systems theory =

Theory in developmental psychology

Ecological systems theory is a broad term used to capture the theoretical contributions of developmental psychologist Urie Bronfenbrenner. Bronfenbrenner developed the foundations of the theory throughout his career, published a major statement of the theory in American Psychologist, articulated it in a series of propositions and hypotheses in his most cited book, The Ecology of Human Development and further developing it in The Bioecological Model of Human Development and later writings. A primary contribution of ecological systems theory was to systemically examine contextual variability in development processes. As the theory evolved, it placed increasing emphasis on the role of the developing person as an active agent in development and on understanding developmental process rather than "social addresses" (e.g., gender, ethnicity) as explanatory mechanisms.

== Overview ==
Ecological systems theory describes a scientific approach to studying lifespan development that emphasizes the interrelationship of different developmental processes (e.g., cognitive, social, biological). It is characterized by its emphasis on naturalistic and quasi-experimental studies, although several important studies using this framework use experimental methodology. Although developmental processes are thought to be universal, they are thought to (a) show contextual variability in their likelihood of occurring, (b) occur in different constellations in different settings and (c) affect different people differently. Because of this variability, scientists working within this framework use individual and contextual variability to provide insight into these universal processes.

The foundations of ecological systems theory can be seen throughout Bronfennbrenner's career. For example, in the 1950s he analyzed historical and social class variations in parenting practices, in the 1960s he wrote an analysis of gender differences focusing on the different cultural meanings of the same parenting practices for boys and girls, and in the 1970s he compared childrearing in the US and USSR, focusing how cultural differences in the concordance of values across social institutions change parent influences.

The formal development of ecological systems theory occurred in three major stages. A major statement of the theory was published in American Psychologist. Bronfenbrenner critiqued then current methods of studying children in laboratories as providing a limited window on development, calling it "the science of the strange behavior of children in strange situations with strange adults for the briefest possible periods of time" (p. 513) and calling for more "ecologically valid" studies of developing individuals in their natural environment. For example, he argued that laboratory studies of children provided insight into their behavior in an unfamiliar ("strange") setting that had limited generalizability to their behavior in more familiar environments, such as home or school. The Ecology of Human Development articulated a series of definitions, propositions and hypotheses that could be used to study human development. This work categorized developmental processes, beginning with genetic and personal characteristics, though proximal influences that the developing person interacted with directly (e.g., social relationships), to influences such as parents' work, government policies or cultural value systems that affected them indirectly. As the theory evolved, it placed increasing emphasis on the role of the developing person as an active agent in development and on understanding developmental process rather than "social addresses" (e.g., gender, ethnicity) as explanatory mechanisms. The final form of the theory, developed in conjunction with Stephen Ceci, was called the Bioecological Model of Human Development and addresses critiques that previous statements of the theory under-emphasized individual difference and efficacy. Developmental processes were conceived of as co-occurring in niches that were lawfully defined and reinforcing. Because of this, Bronfenbrenner was a strong proponent of using social policy interventions as both a way of using science to improve child well-being and as an important scientific tool. Early examples of the application of ecological systems theory are evident in Head Start.

== The five systems ==
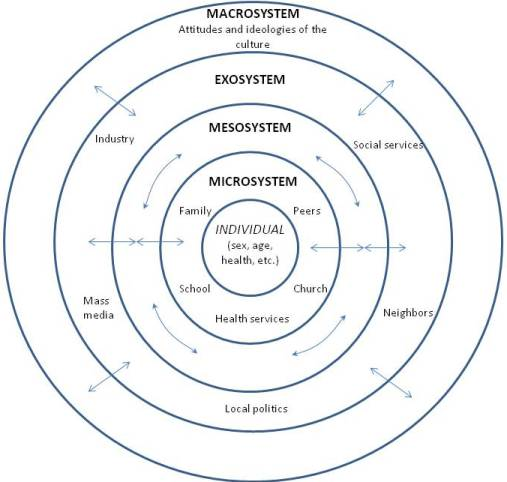
Bronfenbrenner's ecological systems theory

- Microsystem: Refers to the institutions and groups that most immediately and directly impact the child's development including: family, school, siblings, neighborhood, and peers.
- Mesosystem: Consists of interconnections between the microsystems, for example between the family and teachers or between the child's peers and the family.
- Exosystem: Involves links between social settings that do not involve the child. For example, a child's experience at home may be influenced by their parent's experiences at work. A parent might receive a promotion that requires more travel, which in turn increases conflict with the other parent resulting in changes in their patterns of interaction with the child.
- Macrosystem: Describes the overarching culture that influences the developing child, as well as the microsystems and mesosystems embedded in those cultures. Cultural contexts can differ based on geographic location, socioeconomic status, poverty, and ethnicity. Members of a cultural group often share a common identity, heritage, and values. Macrosystems evolve across time and from generation to generation.
- Chronosystem: Consists of the pattern of environmental events and transitions over the life course, as well as changing socio-historical circumstances. For example, researchers have found that the negative effects of divorce on children often peak in the first year after the divorce. By two years after the divorce, family interaction is less chaotic and more stable. An example of changing sociohistorical circumstances is the increase in opportunities for women to pursue a career during the last thirty years.

Later work by Bronfenbrenner considered the role of biology in this model as well; thus the theory has sometimes been called the bioecological model.

Per this theoretical construction, each system contains roles, norms and rules which may shape psychological development. For example, an inner-city family faces many challenges which an affluent family in a gated community does not, and vice versa. The inner-city family is more likely to experience environmental hardships, like crime and squalor. On the other hand, the sheltered family is more likely to lack the nurturing support of extended family.

Since its publication in 1979, Bronfenbrenner's major statement of this theory, The Ecology of Human Development has had widespread influence on the way psychologists and others approach the study of human beings and their environments. As a result of his groundbreaking work in human ecology, these environments—from the family to economic and political structures—have come to be viewed as part of the life course from childhood through adulthood.

Bronfenbrenner has identified Soviet developmental psychologist Lev Vygotsky and German-born psychologist Kurt Lewin as important influences on his theory.

Bronfenbrenner's work provides one of the foundational elements of the ecological counseling perspective, as espoused by Robert K. Conyne, Ellen Cook, and the University of Cincinnati Counseling Program.

There are many different theories related to human development. Human ecology theory emphasizes environmental factors as central to development.

== See also ==
- Bioecological model
- Ecosystem
- Ecosystem ecology
- Systems ecology
- Systems psychology
- Theoretical ecology
