= Urie Bronfenbrenner =

American psychologist

- Born: April 29, 1917; Moscow, Russian Empire
- Died: September 25, 2005 (aged 88); Ithaca, New York, U.S.
- Education: Cornell University; Harvard University; University of Michigan
- Known for: Ecological systems theory, co-founder of the Head Start program
- Spouse: Liese Price
- Children: 6, including Kate
- Scientific career
- Fields: Developmental psychology

Urie Bronfenbrenner (April 29, 1917 – September 25, 2005) was a Russian-born American psychologist best known for using a contextual framework to better understand human development. This framework, broadly referred to as 'ecological systems theory', was formalized in an article published in American Psychologist, articulated in a series of propositions and hypotheses in his most cited book, The Ecology of Human Development and further developed in The Bioecological Model of Human Development and later writings. He argued that natural experiments and applied developmental interventions provide valuable scientific opportunities. These beliefs were exemplified in his involvement in developing the US Head Start program in 1965. Bronfenbrenner's writings about the limitations of understanding child development solely from experimental laboratory research and the potential for using contextual variability to provide insight into developmental processes was important in changing the focus of developmental psychology.

== Early life and education ==
Bronfenbrenner was born in Moscow on April 29, 1917, to Russian Jewish parents, the pathologist Alexander Bronfenbrenner and Eugenie Kamenetski. When he was six, his family moved to the United States, first to Pittsburgh, Pennsylvania, and then a year later to rural New York State. His father worked as a neuropathologist at a hospital for the developmentally disabled called Letchworth Village, located in Rockland County, N.Y.

Bronfenbrenner received a bachelor's in psychology and music from Cornell University in Ithaca, New York, in 1938. He earned a master's in education from Harvard in 1940, and a doctorate in developmental psychology from the University of Michigan in 1942.

== Career ==
Bronfenbrenner entered the U.S. military the day after receiving his doctorate, going on to serve as a psychologist in various military bodies during World War II. After the war, he briefly worked as an assistant chief clinical psychologist for the newly-founded Veterans Administration Clinical Psychology Training Program in Washington, D.C. After working as an assistant professor at the University of Michigan for two years he moved to Cornell University in 1948 as an assistant professor in the Department of Child Development and Family Relations (now the Cornell Department of Human Development). The department was located in the College of Home Economics, one of the state-supported, Land Grant colleges within Cornell University. As a land grant college, it had a strong applied mission and included a nursery school. It was also an interdisciplinary department, including sociologists and historians as well as psychologists. At Cornell, his research focused on child development and the impact of social forces in this development for the rest of his career.

He was appointed to a federal panel about development in impoverished children around 1964 and 1965, with this panel helping in the creation of Head Start in 1965.

Bronfenbrenner wrote over 300 research papers and 14 books, and achieved the title of Jacob Gould Schurman Professor Emeritus of Human Development at Cornell University.

== Personal life ==
He was married to Liese Price and had six children and grandchildren (photo, p. 18, below).

According to Cornell University's 150th Anniversary magazine on the founding of Human Ecology (Vol. 43, No.1, Spring 2015), Urie Brofenbrenner hiked with his father Alexander, first in their native Odessa, Ukraine, and after the family emigrated in 1923, to Pittsburgh, Pennsylvania and then upstate New York (p. 14, Into the woods: How a father's queries sparked a new theory of human development, by Sharon Tregaskis, Class of 1995).

== Death ==
He died at his home in Ithaca, New York, on September 25, 2005, at the age of 88, due to complications with diabetes.

== Views on human development and ecological systems theory ==
Bronfenbrenner saw the process of human development as being shaped by the interaction between an individual and their environment. The specific path of development was a result of the influences of a person's surroundings, such as their parents, friends, school, work, culture, and so on. During his time, he saw developmental psychology as only studying individual influences on development in unnatural settings; in his own words, developmental psychology was, "the science of strange behavior of children in strange situations with strange adults for the briefest possible periods of time."

It is from this vantage point that Bronfenbrenner conceives his theory of human development, the ecological systems theory. His theory states that there are many different levels of environmental influences that can affect a child's development, starting from people and institutions immediately surrounding the individual to nationwide cultural forces. He later accounted for the influence of time, such as specific events and changes in culture over time, by adding the chronosystem to the theory. Furthermore, he eventually renamed his theory the bioecological model to recognize the importance of biological processes in development. However, he only recognized biology as producing a person's potential, with this potential being realized or not via environmental and social forces.

== Head Start ==
In 1964, Bronfenbrenner testified before a congressional hearing about an antipoverty bill, stating that measures should be directed towards children to reduce the effects of poverty on developing persons. This perspective was contrary to the predominant view at the time that child development was purely biological, with no influence of experience or environment on its course. Because of his testimony, he was invited to the White House to discuss the issue with Claudia Alta "Lady Bird" Johnson, with whom he discussed child-care programs of other countries. Furthermore, he was invited to a federal panel that was tasked with developing a method to counteract the effects of child poverty and to get them on an equal educational footing with wealthier students. He worked with 12 other professionals from various fields such as mental and physical health, education, social work, and developmental psychology. Bronfenbrenner convinced the panel to focus efforts on involving a child's family and community in the intervention effort, to expand the program to also focus on the creation of a better environment for development. The panel's recommendations led to the formation of the Head Start in 1965. Bronfenbrenner's input may have helped Head Start develop some of its environmental intervention methods, such as family support services, home visits, and education for parenthood.

== Legacy ==
According to Melvin L. Kohn, a sociologist from Johns Hopkins University, Bronfenbrenner was critical in making social scientists realize that, "...interpersonal relationships, even [at] the smallest level of the parent-child relationship, did not exist in a social vacuum but were embedded in the larger social structures of community, society, economics and politics." His theory also helped to push developmental research into conducting observations and experiments to discern the impact of certain environmental variables on human development. His research and ideas were also influential in the formation and direction of Head Start (see above). Bronfenbrenner's teaching in the Department of Human Development at Cornell University produced a large number of developmental researchers who are now, as Cornell University claims, "leaders in the field."

== Awards ==
- The Ecology of Human Development won the 1980 Anisfield-Wolf Book Award for Nonfiction
- The James McKeen Cattell Fellow Award from the American Psychological Society
- The American Psychological Association renamed its "Lifetime Contribution to Developmental Psychology in the Service of Science and Society" as "The Bronfenbrenner Award."
- Chair, 1970 White House Conference on Children

== Publications ==
- Two Worlds of Childhood: US and USSR. Simon & Schuster, 1970. ISBN 0-671-21238-9
- Influencing Human Development. Holt, Rinehart & Winston, 1973. ISBN 0-03-089176-0
- Influences on Human Development. Holt, Rinehart & Winston, 1975. ISBN 0-03-089413-1
- The Ecology of Human Development: Experiments by Nature and Design. Cambridge, MA: Harvard University Press, 1979. ISBN 0-674-22457-4
- The State of Americans: This Generation and the Next. New York: Free Press, 1996. ISBN 0-684-82336-5
- Making Human Beings Human: Bioecological Perspectives on Human Development. Sage, 2005. ISBN 0761927115
