= Daniel Stokols =

American academic

- Born: 1948 (age 77–78); Miami, Florida
- Education: University of Chicago; University of North Carolina, Chapel Hill
- Children: 2, including Eli Stokols
- Scientific career
- Fields: Environmental psychology
- Workplaces: University of California, Irvine School of Social Ecology
- Thesis: Some Determinants of Alienation in the Small Group
- Doctoral advisor: John Thibaut

Daniel Stokols (born 1948) is Research Professor and Chancellor's Professor Emeritus of Social Ecology in the Departments of Psychology and Social Behavior and Planning, Policy, and Design, and founding dean of the University of California, Irvine School of Social Ecology. Stokols is past President of the Division of Environmental, Population, and Conservation Psychology of the American Psychological Association (APA) and a Fellow of the APA and the Association for Psychological Science.

== Education ==
Stokols completed his doctoral studies at the University of North Carolina at Chapel Hill, in social psychology and earned his B.A from the University of Chicago.

== Academic positions ==
In 1973, Stokols joined the Program in Social Ecology at the University of California, Irvine as an assistant professor. From 1988 to 1998, Stokols served as Director of the Program in Social Ecology and founding dean of the new School of Social Ecology, which was established as the first such school of its kind by the UC Regents in 1992. He is currently Research Professor and Chancellor's Professor Emeritus within the School of Social Ecology and Health Sciences at UCI.

== Research ==
Stokols' research has addressed a number of topics spanning the fields of environmental and health psychology, urban planning, public health, and the science of transdisciplinary team science. His studies of behavioral and health responses to urban stressors have focused on the impacts of airport noise on children attending elementary schools under the flight path of Los Angeles International Airport, and the effects of spatial density, crowding, residential relocation and rush hour automobile commuting on adult populations. His research on the environmental psychology of the Internet has examined the relationships between individuals' perceptions of information overload from both place-based and cyber sources on their subjective well-being. Other areas of Stokols' research include factors that influence the resilience and sustainability of human-environment systems, and circumstances that either facilitate or constrain collaborative processes and outcomes among participants in cross-disciplinary research teams. He also has studied strategies for enhancing transdisciplinary training and education, and the development of students' and scholars' transdisciplinary orientation (TDO). Stokols served as scientific consultant to the National Cancer Institute, Division of Cancer Control and Population Sciences and as a member of NCI's Science of Team Science team between 2005 and 2011. He is currently a consultant for the National Academies Keck Futures Initiative (NAKFI) and a member of UCI's Institute for Clinical and Translational Science and the National Research Council's Committee on the Science of Team Science.

== Teaching ==
Stokols teaches graduate seminars on Principles of Social Ecology and Strategies of Theory Development. He teaches the Environmental Psychology course at UCI, also available online at iTunes. U. Stokols serves as faculty advisor for doctoral and master's degree students within the School of Social Ecology, the Program in Public Health, and the M.D.-Ph.D. Program at UC Irvine.

== Awards ==
- Educator Award, 1988, International Facility Management Association
- University of California Health Net Wellness Lecturer Award, 1991
- Annual Career Award of the Environmental Design Research Association, 1991
- Faculty Interdisciplinary Research Award, UCI School of Social Ecology, 1998
- UCI Chancellor's Award for Excellence in Fostering Undergraduate Research, 2003
- UCI Lauds & Laurels Faculty Achievement Award, 2003
- School of Social Ecology Student Association Professor of the Year Award, 2007
- UCI Senior Class Outstanding Professor Award for the School of Social Ecology, 2009
- Proshansky-Newman Professional Achievement Award Presented by the Society for Environmental, Population, and Conservation Psychology, Division 34 of the American Psychological Association, 2014
- Career Recognition Award, Science of Team Science Annual Conference, presented at SciTS 2015 conference, National Institutes of Health, Bethesda, MD, June 2015

== Selected publications ==
- Stokols, D. (in press). Social ecology in the digital age: Solving complex problems in a globalized world. New York: Academic Press/Elsevier.
- Hall, K.L., Stipelman, B.A., Vogel, A.L., & Stokols, D. (2017). Understanding cross-disciplinary team-based research: Concepts and conceptual models from the Science of Team Science. In Frodeman, R., Klein, J.T., & Pacheco, R.C.S. (Eds.). Oxford Handbook of Interdisciplinarity. Second edition. New York: Oxford University Press, pp. 338–356.
- Gui, X., Forbat, J., Nardi, B., & Stokols, D. (2016). Use of information and communication technology among street drifters in Los Angeles. First Monday, 21(9).
- Schneider, M., & Stokols, D. (2015). Ecology and health. In N.J. Smelser & P.B. Baltes (Eds). The International Encyclopedia of the Social and Behavioral Sciences. Oxford, England: Elsevier Science Publishers, pp. 85–105.
- Misra, S., Stokols, D., & Cheng, L. (2015). The Transdisciplinary Orientation Scale: Factor structure and relation to the integrative quality and scope of scientific publications. Journal of Collaborative Healthcare and Translational Medicine, 3 (2), 1042, 1–10.
- Tomlinson, B., Nardi, B., Patterson, D., Raturi, A., Richardson, D., Saphores, J-D., Stokols, D. (2015). Toward Alternative Decentralized Infrastructures. Proceedings of the 6th Annual Symposium on Computing for Development (ACMDEV), December 2015. London, UK.
- Karlin, B., Davis, N., Sanguinetti, A., Gamble, K., Kirkby, D., & Stokols, D. (2014). Dimensions of conservation. Exploring differences among energy behaviors. Environment and Behavior, 46(4), 423–452.
- Vogel, A.L., Stipelman, B.A., Hall, K.L., Nebeling, L., Stokols, D., & Spruijt-Metz, D. (2014). Pioneering the transdisciplinary team science approach: Lessons learned from National Cancer Institute grantees. Journal of Translational Medicine and Epidemiology, 2(2), 1027.
- Stokols, D. (2014). Training the next generation of transdisciplinarians. In O'Rourke, M.O., Crowley, S., Eigenbrode, S.D., Wulfhorst, J.D. (Eds.), Enhancing communication & collaboration in interdisciplinary research. Los Angeles, CA: Sage Publications, 56-81
- Stokols, D., Hall, K.L., & Vogel, A.L. (2013). Transdisciplinary public health: Core characteristics, definitions, and strategies for success. In Haire-Joshu, D., & McBride, T.D. (Eds.), Transdisciplinary public health: Research, methods, and practice. San Francisco: Jossey-Bass Publishers, 3-30.
- Stokols, D., Lejano, R., & Hipp, J. (2013). Enhancing the resilience of human-environment systems: A social ecological perspective. Ecol & Society, 18(1): 7.
- Lejano, R., & Stokols, D. (2013). Social ecology, sustainability, and economics. Ecological Economics, 89, 1–6.
- Misra, S., Stokols, D., & Heberger Marino, A. (2013). Descriptive, but not injunctive, normative appeals increase response rates in Web-based surveys. Journal of MultiDisciplinary Evaluation, 9(21), 1–10.
- Vogel, A.L., Hall, K.L., Fiore, S.M., Klein, J.T., Bennett, L.M., Gadlin, H., Stokols, D., Nebeling, L.C., Wuchty, S., Patrick, K., Spotts, E.L., Pohl, C., Riley, W.T., & Falk-Krzesinksi, H. (2013). The team science toolkit: Enhancing research collaboration through online knowledge sharing. American Journal of Preventive Medicine, 45(6), 787-789.
- Misra, S., & Stokols, D. (2012). Psychological and health outcomes of perceived information overload. Environment & Behavior.
- Misra, S., Stokols, D., & Heberger-Marino, A. (2012). Using norm-based appeals to increase response rates in evaluation research: A field experiment. American Journal of Evaluation.
- Hall, K., Stokols, D., Stipelman, B., Vogel, A., Feng, A., Masimore, B., Morgan, G., Moser, R.P., Marcus, S.E., & Berrigan, D. (2012). Assessing the value of team science: A study comparing center and investigator-initiated grants. American Journal of Preventive Medicine, 42(2), 157–163.
- Hall, K., Vogel, A., Stipelman, B., Stokols, D., Morgan, G., & Gehlert, S. (2012). A four-phase model of transdisciplinary team-based research: Goals, team processes, and strategies. Translational Behavioral Medicine, doi: 10.1007/s13142-012-0167-y.
- Vogel, A., Feng, A., Oh, A., Hall, K., Stipelman, B., Stokols, D., Okamoto, J., Perna, F., Moser, R., & Nebeling, L. (2012). Influence of a National Cancer Institute transdisciplinary research and training initiative on trainees' transdisciplinary research competencies and scholarly productivity. Translational Behavioral Medicine, doi: 10.1007/s13142-012-0173-0.
- Stokols, D. (2011). Transdisciplinary action research in landscape architecture and planning. Landscape Journal, 30 (1), 1–5.
- Trivedi, C., & Stokols, D. (2011). Social enterprises and corporate enterprises: Fundamental differences and defining features. Journal of Entrepreneurship, 20 (1), 1-32.
- Stokols, D., Hall, K. L., Moser, R. P., Feng, A., Misra, S., & Taylor, B. K. (2010). Evaluating cross-disciplinary team science initiatives: Conceptual, methodological, and translational perspectives. In R. Frodeman, J. T. Klein & C. Mitcham (Eds.), The Oxford Handbook on Interdisciplinarity (pp. 471–493). New York: Oxford University Press.
- Stokols, D., Misra, S., Runnerstrom, M., & Hipp, A. (2009). Psychology in an age of ecological crisis: From Personal Angst to Collective Action. American Psychologist, 64 (3), 181–193.
- Stokols, D., Misra, S., Moser, R.P., Hall, K.L., & Taylor, B.K. (2008). The ecology of team science: Understanding contextual influences on transdisciplinary collaboration. American Journal of Preventive Medicine, 35(2S), S96-S115.
- Stokols, D. (2006). Toward a science of transdisciplinary action research. American Journal of Community Psychology, 38, 63–77.
- Stokols, D., Harvey, R., Gress, J., Fuqua, J., & Phillips, K. (2005). In Vivo studies of transdisciplinary scientific collaboration: Lessons learned and implications for active living research. American Journal of Preventive Medicine, 28(2S2), 202–213.
- Stokols, D., Fuqua, J., Gress, J., Harvey, R., Phillips, K., Baezconde-Garbanati, L., Unger, J., Palmer, P., Clark, M., Colby, S., Morgan, G., & Trochim, W. (2003). Evaluating transdisciplinary science. Nicotine & Tobacco Research, 5, S-1, S21-S39.
- Stokols, D. (1995). The paradox of environmental psychology. American Psychologist, 50, 821–837.
- Stokols, D. (1992). Establishing and maintaining healthy environments: Toward a social ecology of health promotion. American Psychologist, 47, 6-22.
- Stokols, D. and Altman, I. (Eds.) (1987). Handbook of environmental psychology, Volumes 1 and 2. New York: John Wiley and Sons.
