= University of California, Irvine School of Humanities =

Academic unit

School of Humanities
- Type: Public
- Established: 1965
- Parent institution: University of California, Irvine
- Dean: Tyrus Miller
- Faculty: 170
- Students: 1917
- Undergraduates: 1609
- Postgraduates: 308
- Location: Irvine, California, United States
- Website: http://www.humanities.uci.edu

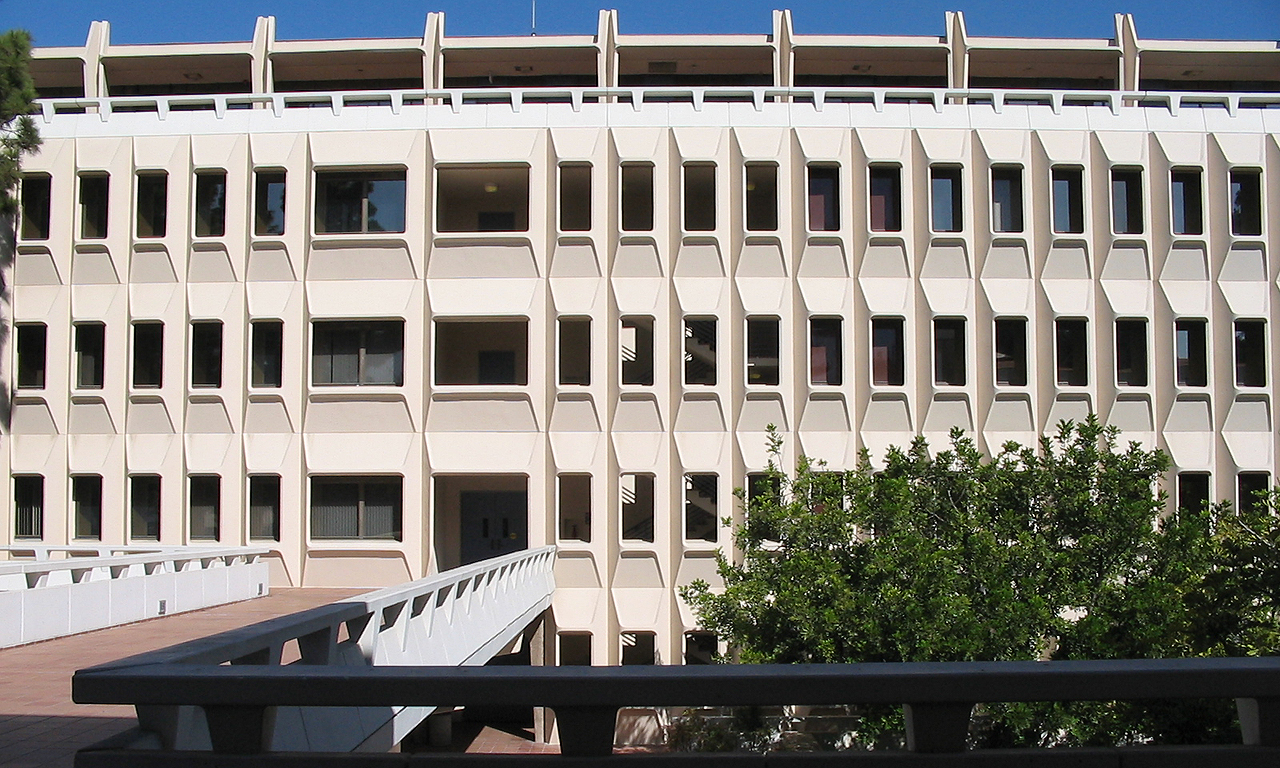
Murray Krieger Hall in the School of Humanities, an example of the Brutalist architecture of the UC Irvine campus.

The School of Humanities is one of the academic units of the University of California, Irvine. Upon the school's opening in 1965, the Division of Humanities was one of the five liberal arts divisions at the campus. Samuel McCulloch was appointed as UC Irvine's founding dean of Humanities in 1963. The School hosts the Thesaurus Linguae Graecae and the University of California Humanities Research Institute.

== History ==
The division of humanities is one of the five liberal arts divisions that opened with the campus in 1965. In 1963, Samuel McCulloch was appointed as the founding dean of UC Irvine Division of Humanities and laid its foundation. He created four departments within the division with 31 faculty members between them. The four departments were: English and Comparative Literature, Foreign Languages and Literature, History, and Philosophy. By 1967, the governing body of UC Irvine turned the five liberal arts divisions into individual schools and the Division of Humanities became the School of Humanities. In 1970 the Humanities Core Course was implemented and there was a focus on strengthening existing Humanities departments for the rest of the 1970s. The school also launched a doctorate in Critical Theory, making UC Irvine the only university in the country to offer a doctorate in the field.

In the 1980s, Dean Ken Bailes founded the Organized Research Unit in Critical Theory and brought the system wide University of California Humanities Research Institute to UC Irvine. A development in this period was the establishment of the East Asian Languages and Literature department (now the Department of East Asian Studies), with Pauline Yu joining in 1989 as founding chair. The School of Humanities expanded throughout the 1990s and 2000s; the Humanities Instructional Building and Humanities Gateway were built and completed the Humanities Quad. In 2005, the Samuel M. Jordan Center for Persian Studies and Culture was established through a $2 million endowment from Fariborz Maseeh and the Massiah Foundation. The center is intended as an "umbrella organization for various activities related to the study of Iran and the Persianate world". The school now has a total of 13 departments and around 20 majors and several interdisciplinary programs.

The university opened a Center for Jewish Studies in 2017.

== People ==
=== Notable faculty ===
- Margaret Gilbert Margaret Gilbert (born 1942) is a British philosopher best known for her founding contributions to the analytic philosophy of social phenomena.
- Duncan Pritchard FRSE is the chancellor's professor of philosophy and the director of graduate studies at the University of California, Irvine.
- Jacques Derrida, French philosopher who was part of the School's faculty from 1986 until shortly before he died in 2004.
- Murray Krieger, American literary critic and theorist. Krieger was the founder of the School's Critical Theory Institute.
- Barry Siegel, Pulitzer-Prize winning journalist is founding director of the school's Literary Journalism Program.
- Ngũgĩ wa Thiong'o, Kenyan writer and academic is founding director of the school's International Center for Writing and Translation.

=== Deans ===
- Samuel McCulloch (1963-1969)
- Hazard Adams (1970-1972)
- William Lillyman (1974-1982)
- Kendall Bailes (1982-1985)
- Terence Parsons (1985-1991)
- Spencer Olin (1992-1996)
- Karen Lawrence (1998-2007)
- Vicki Ruiz (2008-2012)
- Georges Van Den Abbeele (2013–2018)
- Tyrus Miller (2018–present)

== Rankings ==
U.S. News & World Report

- 2017: Best graduate schools for English ranked #17
- 2013: Best graduate schools for History ranked #36

== Sources ==
- Official website
