= University of California, Irvine School of Social Sciences =

Academic unit

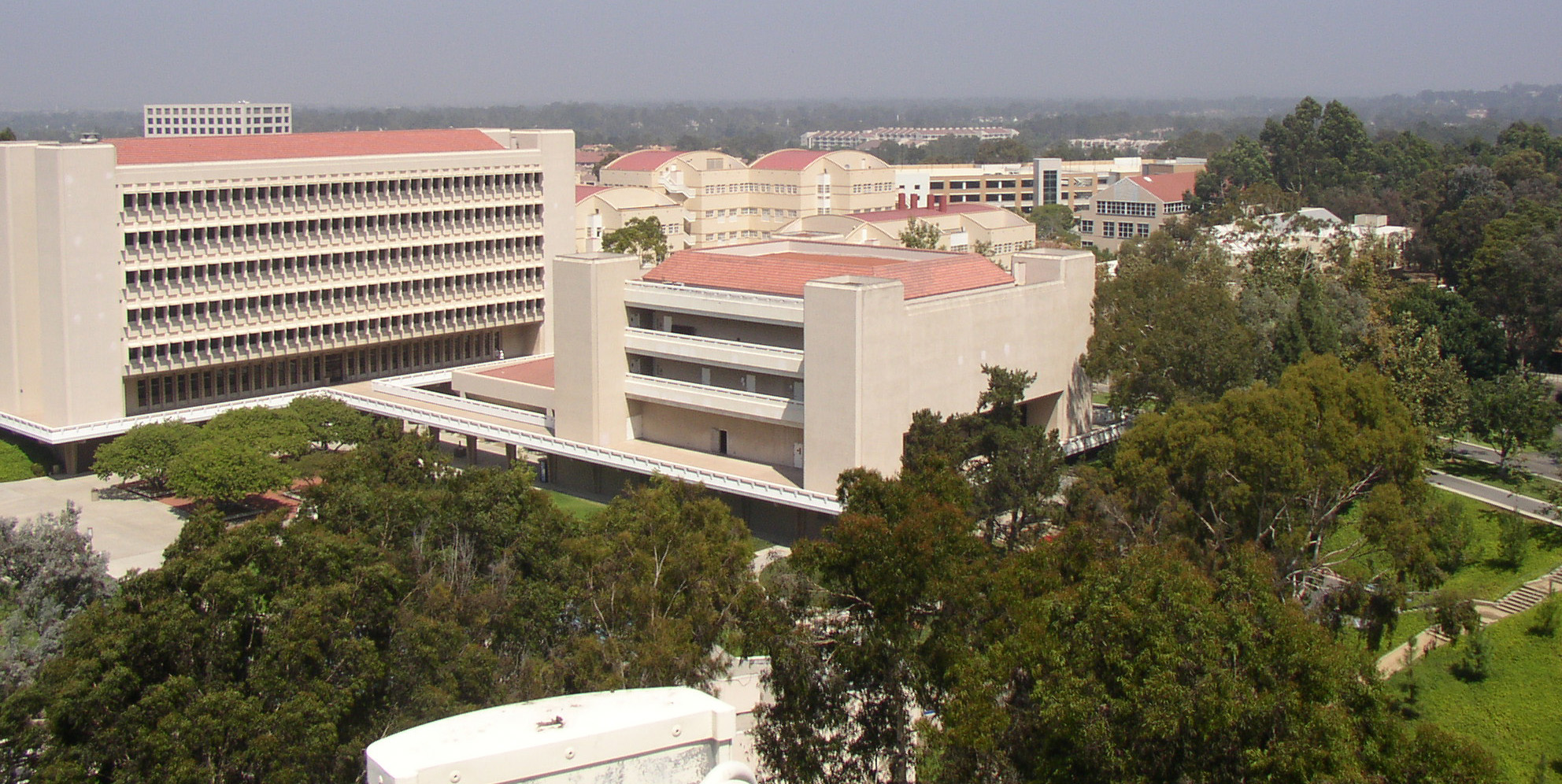

The School of Social Sciences is an academic unit of the University of California, Irvine (UCI) that studies the social sciences. The School is the largest academic unit in the university with an enrollment of over 5,300 students. More than a third of the bachelor's degrees conferred at UCI are from the School of Social Sciences. It is home to the departments of Anthropology, Chicano-Latino Studies, Cognitive Science, Economics, Logic and Philosophy of Science, Political Science, International Studies, and Sociology.

UC Irvine's School of Social Sciences is also home to several research and educational entities including the Institute for Mathematical Behavioral Sciences (IMBS, headed by Donald G. Saari), the Center for Global Peace and Conflict Studies (GPACS), the Center for Cognitive Neuroscience, and the Center for the Study of Democracy (headed by Bernard Grofman).

== History ==
The School of Social Sciences was founded in 1965.

The Social Science Tower at UCI was featured in the film Conquest of the Planet of the Apes in 1972.

== Undergraduate studies ==
The school offers 11 undergraduate majors in 7 different departments, each providing a Bachelor of Arts degree. Departments within the Social of Social Sciences include Anthropology, Chicano/Latino Studies, Cognitive Sciences, Economics, Logic and Philosophy of Science (Philosophy), Political Science, and Sociology. Majors that are offered are Anthropology, Business Economics, Chicano/Latino Studies, Cognitive Sciences, Demographic and Social Analysis, Economics, International Studies, Mathematical Behavioral Sciences, Philosophy, Political Science, Quantitative Economics, Social Policy and Public Services, Social Science, and Sociology.

== Graduate studies ==
The school offers three M.A. programs and seven Ph.D. programs.
