= Bioecological model =

Part of Bronfenbrenner's ecological system theory

The bioecological model of development is the mature and final revision of Urie Bronfenbrenner's ecological system theory. The primary focus of ecological systems theory is on the systemic examination of contextual variability in development processes. It focuses on the world outside the developing person and how they were affected by it. After publication of The Ecology of Human Development, Bronfenbrenner's first comprehensive statement of ecological systems theory, additional refinements were added to the theory. Whereas earlier statements of ecological systems theory focused on characteristics of the environment, the goal of the bioecological model was to explicate how characteristics of the developing person influenced the environments to which the person was exposed and how they were affected by the environment. The bioecological model is strongly influenced by Bronfenbrenner's collaborations with Stephen Ceci. Whereas much of Bronfenbrenner's work had focused on social development and the influence of social environments on development, Ceci's work focuses on memory and intelligence. The bioecological model reflects Ceci's work on contextual variability in intelligence and cognition and Bronfenbrenner's interest in developmentally instigative characteristics - how people help to create their own environments.

== Evolution of Bronfenbrenner's theory ==
Bronfenbrenner's initial investigations into contextual variability in developmental processes can be seen in the 1950s in the analysis of differences in methods of parental discipline as a function of historical time and social class. It was further developed in his work on the differential effects of parental discipline on boys and girls in the 1960s and of convergence of socialization processes in the US and USSR in the 1970s. These works were expressed in the experimental variations built in the development and implementation of the HeadStart program. informally discussed new ideas concerning Ecological Systems Theory throughout the late 1970s and early 1980s during lectures and presentations to the psychological community. Bronfenbrenner published a major statement of ecological systems theory in American Psychologist, articulated it in a series of propositions and hypotheses in his most cited book, The Ecology of Human Development and further developing it in The Bioecological Model of Human Development and later writings.

Bronfenbrenner's early thinking was strongly influenced by other developmentalists and social psychologists who studied developmental processes as contextually bound and dependent on the meaning of experience as defined by the developing person. One strong influence was Lev Vygotsky, a Russian psychologist who emphasized recognized that learning always occurs and cannot be separated from a social context. A second influence was Kurt Lewin, a German forerunner of ecological systems models who focused on a person's psychological activities that occur within a kind of psychological field, including all the events in the past, present, and future that shape and affect an individual. The centrality of the person's interpretation of their environment and phenomenological nature was built on the work of Thomas & Thomas: “(i)f men define situations as real they are real in their consequences”.

Bronfenbrenner was also influenced by his colleague, Stephen J. Ceci, with whom he co-authored the article “Nature-nurture reconceptualized in developmental perspective: A bioecological theory” in 1994. Ceci is a developmental psychologist who redefined modern developmental psychology's approach to intellectual development. He focused on predicting a pattern of associations among ecological, genetic, and cognitive variables as a function of proximal processes. Together, Bronfenbrenner and Ceci published the beginnings of the bioecological model and made it an accessible framework to use in understanding developmental processes.

== History ==
The history of bioecological systems theory is divided into two periods. The first period resulted in the publication of Bronfenbrenner's theory of ecological systems theory, titled The Ecology of Human Development, in 1979. Bronfenbrenner described the second period as a time of criticism and evaluation of his original work.

The development of ecological systems theory arose because Bronfenbrenner noted a lack of focus on the role of context in terms of development. He argued the environment in which children operate is important because development may be shaped by their interactions with the specific environment. He urged his colleagues to study development in terms of ecological contexts, that is the normal environments of children (schools, homes, daycares). Researchers heeded his advice and a great deal of research flourished in the early 1980s that focused on context.

However, where prior research was ignoring context, Bronfenbrenner felt current research focused too much on context and ignored development. In his justification for a new theory, Bronfenbrenner wrote he was not pleased with the direction of research in the mid 1980s and that he felt there were other realms of development that were overlooked.

In comparison to the original theory, bioecological systems theory adds more emphasis to the person in the context of development. Additionally, Bronfenbrenner chose to leave out key features of the ecological systems theory (e.g., ecological validity and ecological experiments) during his development of bioecological systems theory. As a whole, Bronfenbrenner's new theory continued to go through a series of transformations as he continuously analyzed different factors in human development. Critical components of bioecological systems theory did not emerge all at once. Instead, his ideas evolved and adapted to the research and ideas of the times. For example, the role of proximal processes, which is now recognized as a key feature of bioecological systems theory, did not emerge until the 1990s. This theory went through a series of transformations and elaborations until 2005 when Bronfenbrenner died.

== PPCT model ==
Bronfenbrenner further developed the model by adding the chronosystem, which refers to how the person and environments change over time. He also placed a greater emphasis on processes and the role of the biological person. The process–person–context–time model (PPCT) has since become the bedrock of the bioecological model. PPCT includes four concepts. The interactions between the concepts form the basis for the theory.

1. Process – Bronfenbrenner viewed proximal processes as the primary mechanism for development, featuring them in two central propositions of the bioecological model.

Proposition 1: [H]uman development takes place through processes of progressively more complex reciprocal interaction between an active, evolving biopsychological human organism and the persons, objects, and symbols in its immediate external environment. To be effective, the interaction must occur on a fairly regular basis over extended periods of time. Such enduring forms of interaction in the immediate environment are referred to as proximal processes.

Proximal processes are the development processes of systematic interaction between person and environment. Bronfenbrenner identifies group and solitary activities such as playing with other children or reading as mechanisms through which children come to understand their world and formulate ideas about their place within it. However, processes function differently depending on the person and the context.

Proposition 2: The form, power, content, and direction of the proximal processes effecting development vary systematically as a joint function of the characteristics of the developing person; of the environment—both immediate and more remote—in which the processes are taking place; the nature of the developmental outcomes under consideration; and the social continuities and changes occurring over time through the life course and the historical period during which the person has lived.

2. Person – Bronfenbrenner acknowledged the role that personal characteristics of individuals play in social interactions. He identified three personal characteristics that can significantly influence proximal processes across the lifespan. Demand characteristics such as age, gender or physical appearance set processes in motion, acting as “personal stimulus” characteristics. Resource characteristics are not as immediately recognizable and include mental and emotional resources such as past experiences, intelligence, and skills as well as material resources such as access to housing, education, and responsive caregivers. Force characteristics are related to variations in motivation, persistence and temperament. Bronfenbrenner notes that even when children have equivalent access to resources, their developmental courses may differ as a function of characteristics such as drive to succeed and persistence in the face of hardship. In doing this, Bronfenbrenner provides a rationale for how environments (i.e., the systems mentioned above under “The Original Model: Ecological Systems Theory”) influence personal characteristics, yet also suggests personal characteristics can change environments.

3. Context – Context involves five interconnected systems, which are based on Bronfenbrenner’s original model, ecological systems theory. The microsystem describes environments such as home or school in which children spend significant time interacting. Mesosystems are interrelations between microsystems. The exosystem describes events that have important indirect influence on development (e.g., a parent consistently working late). The macrosystem is a feature of any group (culture, subculture) that share values and belief systems. The chronosystem describes historical circumstances that affect contexts at all other levels.

4. Time – Time has a prominent place in this developmental model. It is constituted at three levels: microtime, mesotime, and macrotime. Microtime refers to what is happening during specific episodes of proximal processes. Mesotime refers to the extent to which the processes occur in the person’s environment, such as over the course of days, weeks or years. Macrotime (or the chronosystem) focuses on the shifting expectancies and events in wider culture. This functions both within and across generations and affects proximal processes across the lifespan.

Thus, the bioecological model highlights the importance of understanding a person's development within environmental systems. It further explains that both the person and the environment affect one another bidirectionally. Although even Bronfenbrenner himself critiqued the falsifiability of the model, the bioecological model has real world applications for developmental research, practice, and policies (as demonstrated below).

== Research implications ==
In addition to adding to the theoretical understanding of human development, the bioecological model lends itself to changes in the conceptualization of the research endeavor. In some of his earliest comments on the state of developmental research, Bronfenbrenner lamented that developmental research concerned itself with studying “strange behavior of children in strange situations for the briefest possible period of time”. He proposed, rather, that developmental science should take as its goal a study of children in context in order to best determine which processes are naturally “developmentally generative” (promote development) and which are naturally “developmentally disruptive” (prevent development).

Bronfenbrenner set up a contrast to the traditional “confirmatory” approach to hypothesis testing (in which research is done to “confirm” that a hypothesis is correct or incorrect) when specifying the types of research needed to support the bioecological model of development. In Bronfenbrenner's view, the dynamic nature of the model calls for “primarily generative” research designs that explore interactions between proximal processes (see Proposition 1) and the developing person, environment, time, and developmental outcome (Proposition 2). Bronfenbrenner called this type of research the “discovery mode” of developmental science.

To best capture such dynamic processes, developmental research designs would ideally be longitudinal (over time), rather than cross-sectional (a single point in time), and conducted in children's natural environments, rather than a laboratory. Such designs would thus occur in schools, homes, day-care centers, and other environments in which proximal processes are most likely to occur. The bioecological model also proposes that the most scientifically rich studies would include more than one distinct but theoretically related proximal process in the same design. Indeed, studies that claim to be based upon bioecological theory should include elements of process, person, context, and time, and should include explicit explanation and acknowledgement if one of the elements is lacking. Based on the interactions of proposed elements of the PPCT model, appropriate statistical analyses of PPCT data would likely include explorations of mediation and moderation effects, as well as multilevel modeling of data to account for the nesting of different components of the model. Moreover, research that includes both genetic and environmental components would capture even more of the bioecological model's elements.

== Ecological techno-subsystem ==
The ecological systems theory emerged before the advent of Internet revolution and the developmental influence of then available technology (e.g., television) was conceptually situated in the child's microsystem. Johnson and Puplampu, for instance, proposed in 2008 the ecological techno-subsystem, a dimension of the microsystem. This microsystem comprises both child interaction with living (e.g., peers, parents, teachers) and non-living (e.g., hardware, gadgets) elements of communication, information, and recreation technologies in immediate or direct environments. Johnson published a validation study in 2010.

== Neo-ecological theory ==
Whereas the theory of the techno-subsystem merely highlights the influence that digital technologies have on the development of an individual within the microsystem, Navarro and Tudge argue that the virtual world be given its own consideration throughout the Bioecological model. They suggest two key modifications as a way to incorporate Bonfenbrenner's theory into our technologized world:

1. The microsystem should be delineated to include distinct forms in which an individual lives: physical microsystem and virtual microsystem.
2. The role of the macrosystem, specifically the cultural influence of digital technology, should be emphasized in understanding human development.

== See also ==
- Ecological systems theory
- Diathesis-stress model
