= Kharkov school of psychology =

The Kharkov school of psychology (Харьковская психологическая школа; Ukrainian: Харківська психологічна школа, romanized: Kharkivska psykholohichna shkola) is a tradition of developmental psychological research conducted in the paradigm of Lev Vygotsky's "sociocultural theory of mind" and Leontiev's psychological activity theory.

== Kharkov group: the beginning of the school ==
The school was founded by its leader Alexander Luria, who—along with Mark Lebedinsky and Alexei Leontev—moved from Moscow to Kharkiv, the capital of Soviet Ukraine until 1934. The core of the group was formed by Luria, Lebedinsky, and Leontiev and their Moscow colleagues, Zaporozhets and Bozhovich, along with a group of such local researchers as Galperin, Asnin, P. Zinchenko, Lukov, Khomenko, Kontsevaya, Rozenblyum, etc. The group conducted a wide range of psychological studies on concept formation in children, voluntary and involuntary memory, development of visual-operational thinking, voluntary behaviour, and reasoning, the role of orientation in thought and activity, etc. that laid the foundation for the psychological theory of activity.

== P. I. Zinchenko and the Kharkov school of developmental psychology ==
In the postwar period, the scientific work of the school developed under informal leadership of Pyotr Zinchenko in the field of the psychology of memory. The major achievement of the school is the systematic analysis of the phenomenon of involuntary memory from the standpoint of the activity approach in psychology. Soviet studies of involuntary memory carried out by the representatives of the Kharkiv school influenced psychological research both nationally and worldwide (e.g., memory research by A. Brown, Murphy, Meacham, Sophian, Hagen, etc.).

The information processing or engineering psychology approach to memory and cognition was developed in the research by Zinchenko, Bocharova, Nevel'skii, Repkina. On the other hand, research on the role of involuntary memory in education and memory in thinking and personality development was conducted by Sereda, Ivanova, and associates.

Another major area of research is the theory and practice of developmental teaching (or the system of El'konin-Davydov) associated with such representatives of the Kharkiv school as Repkin, Bodanskii, Dusavitskii.

== Selected publications ==
=== Special journal issues ===
- Soviet psychology (renamed Journal of Russian and East European Psychology), 1979–1980, 18 (2) (early period, 1930-40s: Zaporozhets, Asnin, Khomenko, Lukov, Bozhovich, Zinchenko, Gal'perin),
- Soviet psychology (renamed Journal of Russian and East European Psychology), 1983–84, 22(2) (1939: Zinchenko, P. I. The problem of involuntary memory, 55–111).
- Journal of Russian and East European Psychology, 1994, 32 (2) (postwar period, (1950-90s: Sereda, Ivanova), and
- Journal of Russian and East European Psychology, 2003, 41 (5) (developmental teaching in Kharkiv, 1960-1990s: Repkin, Dusavitskii)
- Journal of Russian and East European Psychology, 2008, 46, (5) (P.I. Zinchenko's psychology of memory: the studies of 1930-1960s)
- Journal of Russian and East European Psychology, 2008, 46, (6) (P.I. Zinchenko's psychology of memory: contemporary critical evaluations)
- Journal of Russian and East European Psychology, 2011, 49, (1) (G.K. Sereda's legacy in psychology of memory research)
- Journal of Russian and East European Psychology, 2011, 49, (2) (P.I. Zinchenko's legacy in contemporary psychological research)

=== Selected papers In English ===
- Ivanova, E. F. (2000). The development of voluntary behaviour in preschoolers. Repetition of Z. M. Manuilenko's experiments. Journal of Russian and East European Psychology, 38 (2), March–April 2000, p. 7–21.
- Ivanova, E. F. & Nevoyennaya E.A. (1998). The historical evolution of mnemonic processes. Journal of Russian and East European Psychology, 36 (3), May–June 1998, p. 60–77.

=== Influences on memory research in the West ===
- Meacham, J. A. (1972). The development of memory abilities in the individual and society. Human Development, 15, 205–228. Reprinted in J. G. Seamon (Ed.), Recent contributions in memory and cognition. Oxford: Oxford University Press, 1980. pp. 415–430.
- Meacham, J.A. (1977). Soviet investigations of memory development. In R.V. Kail & J.W. Hagen (Eds.), Perspective on the Development of Memory and Cognition (Vol. 9, pp. 273–295). Hillsdale, NJ: Erlbaum.
- Murphy, M. D., & Brown, A. L. (1975). Incidental learning in preschool children as a function of level of cognitive analysis. Journal of Experimental Child Psychology, 19 (3), 509–523.
- Sophian, C., & Hagen, J. W. (1978). Involuntary memory and the development of retrieval skills in young children. Journal of Experimental Child Psychology, 26, 458–471.
- Brown, A.L. (1979). Theories of memory and the problems of development: Activity, growth, and knowledge. In L.S. Cermak & F.I.M. Craik (Eds.), Levels of Processing in Human Memory. Hillsdale, NJ: Lawrence Erlbaum Associates.

== See also ==
- Cultural-historical activity theory (CHAT)
- Leading activity
- Kharkiv Institute of Labor

== Sources ==
- Leont'ev, A. N. (1976/1986). Problema deyatel'nosti v istorii sovetskoj psixologii (Проблема деятельности в истории советской психологии) [The problem of activity in the history of Soviet psychology]. In Voprosy psikhologii, 1986, No. 4 (in Russian)
  - Leont'ev, A. N. (1976/1989). The Problem of Activity in the History of Soviet Psychology. Journal of Russian and East European Psychology, 27 (1), 22 – 39
- Zaporozhets, A. V. & El'konin, D.B. (Запорожец А.В., Эльконин Д. Б.) (1979). Вклад ранних исследований А. Н. Леонтьева в развитие теории деятельности // Вестник МГУ, Серия 14. Психология, No. 4, с. 14—24 (see English comment to Russian publication)
- Cole, M. (1980). Introduction: The Kharkov school of developmental psychology. In Soviet psychology, 18, 2
- Cole, M. (1994). Introduction. Soviet psychology, 32, 2.
- Ivanova, E.F. (Иванова Е.Ф.) (2002). Харьковская психологическая школа 30-х годов: история создания и методологические принципы // Вісник Харківського університету, N 550, частина 1. Серія психологія, с. 97–98
  - Kharkiv State University Department of psychology website
- Леонтьев А. А., Леонтьев Д. А., & Соколова Е. Е. (2005). Алексей Николаевич Леонтьев: деятельность, сознание, личность. Харьков и вокруг него. М.: Смысл, 2005. С. 8-141
- Sokolova E.E. (Соколова Е.Е.) (2007). Линии разработки идей Л.С. Выготского в Харьковской психологической школе // Культурно-историческая психология, 1, 2007
