= Leontyev =

Leontyev, Leontief, Leontiev, Leontjew, Leontjev, or Leont'ev (Russian: Леонтьев) and Leontyeva (Леонтьева; feminine) is a Russian surname. Notable people with the surname include:

- Alexei Leontyev (1917–?), Soviet mathematician
- Alexei Leontyev (1716–1786), one of the first Russian sinologists
- Aleksei N. Leontiev (1903–1979), Soviet psychologist, the founder of activity theory
- Aleksei A. Leontiev(1936–2004), Soviet psychologist and linguist, one of the founders of the Soviet psycholinguistics, the son of Aleksei N. Leontiev
- Konstantin Leontiev (1831–1891), Russian philosopher
- Lev Leontiev (1901–?), Soviet economist
- Mikhail Leontiev (born 1958), Russian reporter working for Channel One
- Oleg Leontyev (1920–?), Soviet geomorphologist
- Sergei Leontiev (1879 or 1880 – after 1932), Russian politician
- Sergey Leontiev (born 1944), former Vice President of Transnistria
- Valentina Leontieva (1923–2007), Soviet TV anchor
- Valery Leontiev (born 1949), Russian pop singer
- Viktor Leontyev (born 1940), Soviet Olympic gymnast
- Wassily Leontief (1905–1999), economist
