= PsyAnima =

- Discipline: Psychology
- Language: English
- Edited by: Boris Meshcheryakov

Publication details
- History: 2008-2014
- Publisher: International University "Dubna" (Russia)
- Frequency: Quarterly
- Open access: yes

Standard abbreviations
- ISO 4: PsyAnima

Indexing
- ISSN: 2076-7099

Links
- Journal homepage

PsyAnima, Dubna Psychological Journal was a scientific journal that published articles on psychological theory, history, methodology, as well as empirical studies. Known mainly for the series of special thematic journal issues about Lev Vygotsky and his legacy and in cultural-historical psychology.

== History ==
The journal was founded in 2008 under the auspices of University "Dubna", Russia as a publication vehicle for local psychologists as well as for those not connected with this institution, including international audience of readers and authors. Journal published scholarly studies and research materials in English, Russian, German, Portuguese, and French. Since 2014, the journal's issues have ceased.

== Aims and goals ==
Originally PsyAnima's was a journal of general and, mostly, experimental psychology. Later, it gradually came to focus on three specific themes:

1. "Vygotskian Studies" covering but limited to the topics of

- the history, textology, and theory of the Vygotsky Circle
- archival and publishing activities
- cross-disciplinary studies in the footsteps of Lev Vygotsky

2. Integrative and holistic theory of cultural-historical and bio-social development:

- "cultural-historical Gestalt psychology" of the scholars of the circle of Lev Vygotsky, Alexander Luria, Kurt Koffka and Kurt Lewin
- holistic theories of Max Wertheimer, Wolfgang Köhler, Kurt Goldstein, Adolf Meyer, Heinz Werner, Felix Krüger, Nikolai Bernstein, and many others
- history and theory of holism
- methodology and methods of non-reductionist research
- love and soul as the objects of scientifically rigorous empirical investigation.

3. Transnational science:

- Russian psychology in global context: scientific exchange, bi-directional import and export of Russian and non-Russian science
- linguistic issues in transnational science
- research on migrations of scholars, publications abroad, national scientific policies worldwide, transnational scientific associations, societies, foundations, philanthropies, and funding institutions
- transnational nature of scientific knowledge: selection, circulation, and transformation of knowledge as its essential form of existence

== Special projects ==
The journal has published several special issues on Vygotsky's legacy, featuring contributions from leading international Vygotskian and Lurian scholars including Jerome Bruner, Oliver Sacks, Elkhonon Goldberg, Michael Cole , René van der Veer , Peter Keiler, Luciano Mecacci, Jüri Allik, and other authors whose groundbreaking studies precipitated the ongoing "Revisionist revolution" in Vygotskian science. More specifically, there are several ongoing special projects supported by the editorial team of the journal that include such as:

- Cultural-historical psychotherapy
- "Uzbeks DO HAVE illusions!" Cross-cultural studies in psychology
- Vygotsky as Art and Literary Scholar: The problems of cultural-historical psychology of language, literature, and art
- Transnational history of Russian psychology

== The Complete Works of L.S. Vygotsky ==
In addition to a series of textological works on discourse of Vygotsky's published works that followed recent "archival revolution" in Vygotskian studies, the journal has launched "PsyAnima Complete Vygotsky" project republishing rare and virtually inaccessible texts of Soviet scholars associated with Vygotsky Circle that have never been published since the 1920s-1930s and remain virtually unknown to general reader and professional scholars. All these publications of Vygotsky's works and comments to them are distributed in electronic form and free of charge. This, along with a series of critical textological and theoretical research publications on Vygotsky's legacy, makes this journal the leading edition of the rapidly growing Revisionist movement in Vygotskian science and the major vehicle for the first ever edition of The Complete Works of L.S. Vygotsky.
