= Vladimir Asnin =

Soviet psychologist

Vladimir Ilyich Asnin (Russian: Владимир Ильич Аснин; c. 1904 in Kremenchuk – 1956) was a Soviet developmental psychologist, a representative of Kharkov School of Psychology, and the head of the Department of Psychology at the Kharkov State pedagogical institute in 1944–1950.

In the 1930s, in collaboration with Leont'ev, Zaporozhets, Gal'perin, Zinchenko and other members of the Kharkov group developed the fundamentals of psychological activity theory.

== Selected publications ==
- Leontiev, A. N. & Asnin, V. I. (1932-1933/2005). Transference of Action as a Function of Intellect: A Study of the Intellectual Activity of the Child Using a Variable Problem Box. Journal of Russian and East European Psychology, 43(4), July–August 2005, pp. 29–33.
- Аснин В. И. (1936). Своеобразие двигательных навыков в зависимости от условий их образования. — Науч. зап. Харьковского пед. ин-та, 1936, т. 1, с. 37—65
- Аснин В. И. К вопросу об условиях надежности психологического исследования интеллекта. — В сб.: Тезисы докладов научной сессии Харьковского пед. ин-та, 1938;
- Asnin, V. I. (1941). Ob usloviyax nadyozhnosti psixologichekogo eksperimenta. In Pratsi kafedry psykhologii, Naukovi zapisky Kharkivs'kogo derzhavnogo pedagogichnogo instytutu, vol. 6. Kharkov, 1941 (Об условиях надежности психологического эксперимента. — Учен. зап. Харьковского пед. ин-та, 1941, т. VI, с. 125; in Ukrainian). (Об условиях надежности психологического эксперимента . In Ильясов, И.И., & Ляудис, В.Л. Хрестоматия по возрастной и педагогической психологии. Работы советских авторов 1918-1945 г. М. 1980. Also in Хрестоматия по возрастной и педагогической психологии. Ч.1./ Ред.-Сост. О.А. Карабанова, А.И. Подольский, Г.В. Бурменская. - М., 1999) (in Russian). -- Published in English as
- Asnin, V. I. (1941/1980). The conditions for reliability of a psychological experiment. In Soviet psychology, Winter, 1980–81, 19(2), 80–99.
- Asnin, V. I. (1941/1979-1980). The development of visual-operational thinking in children. Soviet psychology, 18(2), 23–36.
- Аснин, В. И. (1956). О научной работе коллектива психологов Харьковского государственого педагогического института. Вопросы психологии, 1956, #3, с. 113-114
