= John James Ketterer =

John Ketterer
- Born: June 15, 1951 (age 75); Keokuk, Iowa, United States
- Other names: John James Ketterer, Jay Ketterer

Education
- Education: University of Iowa (Bachelor of English, and Bachelor in Religion, B.A.) 1949, (M.A. English/education) 1971, University of North Texas (M.Ed. Educational Administration) 1985, University of Alabama (Ed.D., Administration and instructional leadership) 1998

John James (Jay) Ketterer is an Associate Professor of Educational Technology in the College of Education and Professional Studies at Jacksonville State University. As an adjunct professor for The University of Alabama, he teaches Cognition and Strategies and Technology in the Interactive Technology with an emphasis in the General HES degree. He also serves on the teaching team for the non-thesis research and special problems classes as the advisory team for course reviews and peer reviewing for the program.

== Career ==
Dr. Ketterer was the Executive Director of the International Endowment Foundation, Inc., through which he directed the International House Program at Jacksonville State University (JSU) and served as director of International Programs at JSU.

His research interests include cognitive studies particularly linguistics and learning, diversity and tolerance, and transformative models of school management and design. He recently authored the entry Zone of Proximal Development (Vygotsky) for the Encyclopedia of Educational Psychology (Sage, 2007) and writes a regular column as the Executive Editor for Inter-Ed, the flagship publication of The Association for Advancement of International Education. He is also a member of the curriculum development committee for The 100 People Foundation.

Dr. Ketterer is the Associate Editor of The International Forum of Teaching and Studies and is a member of the editorial review board of The Online Journal of Distance Learning Administration.

=== Positions ===
Currently serves as Full Professor of the College of Education and Professional Studies at Jacksonville State University in Jacksonville, Alabama—Department of Educational Resources; granted tenure; and serves as the Director of International House and Programs at Jacksonville State University—administrative position, retaining faculty rank and tenure track appointment in the College of Education. He also served as Professor of Education at Jacksonville State University in Jacksonville, Alabama—Department of Educational Resources, before his retirement from JSU in June, 2014.
