= Lev Vygotsky =

Soviet psychologist (1896–1934)

- Лев Выготский
- Born: Lev Simkhovich Vygotsky; 17 November [O.S. 5 November] 1896; Orsha, Mogilev Governorate, Russian Empire (now Belarus)
- Died: June 11, 1934 (aged 37); Moscow, Russian SFSR, Soviet Union
- Education: Imperial Moscow University; Shanyavsky Moscow City People's University
- Known for: Cultural-historical psychology, zone of proximal development, inner speech
- Spouse: Roza Smekhova (m. 1924)
- Scientific career
- Fields: Psychology
- Workplaces: Moscow State University
- Thesis: The Psychology of Art (1925)
- Notable students: Alexander Luria

Lev Semyonovich Vygotsky (Russian: Лев Семёнович Выготский, IPA: [vɨˈɡotskʲɪj]; Belarusian: Леў Сямёнавіч Выгоцкі; 17 November [O.S. 5 November] 1896 – June 11, 1934) was a Russian and Soviet psychologist, best known for his work on psychological development in children and creating the framework known as cultural-historical activity theory. After his early death, his books and research were banned in the Soviet Union until Joseph Stalin's death in 1953, with a first collection of major texts published in 1956. A Review of General Psychology survey, published in 2002, ranked Vygotsky as the 83rd most cited psychologist of the 20th century.

His major ideas include:

- The social origin of mind: Vygotsky believed that human mental and cognitive abilities are not biologically determined, but instead created and shaped by use of language and tools in the process of interacting and constructing the cultural and social environment.
- The importance of mediation: He saw mediation as the key to human development, because it leads to the use of cultural tools and becomes a pathway for psychological development through the process of interiorization.
- The zone of proximal development: Vygotsky introduced the concept, which refers to the gap between a child's current level of development and the level they are capable of reaching with tools provided by others with more knowledge.
- The significance of play: Vygotsky viewed play as a crucial aspect of children's development, as he thought of it as the best sandbox to build and develop the practice of mediation.

== Early life and education ==
Lev Simkhovich Vygodsky (his patronymic was later changed to Semyonovich and his surname to Vygotsky for unclear reasons) was born on November 17, 1896, in the town of Orsha in Mogilev Governorate of the Russian Empire (now Belarus) into a non-religious middle-class Jewish family of Simkha Leibovich (also known as Semyon Lvovich), a banker, and Tsetsilia Moiseevna.

Vygotsky was raised in the city of Gomel, where he was home-schooled until 1911 and then obtained a formal degree with distinction in a private Jewish gymnasium, which allowed him entrance to a university. In 1913, Vygotsky was admitted to the Moscow University by mere ballot through a "Jewish Lottery"; at the time, a three percent Jewish student quota was administered for entry in Moscow and Saint Petersburg Universities. He had an interest in the humanities and social sciences, but at the insistence of his parents he applied to the medical school at Moscow University. During the first semester of study, he transferred to the law school. In parallel, he attended lectures at Shanyavsky Moscow City People's University.

== Career ==
In January 1924, Vygotsky took part in the Second All-Russian Psychoneurological Congress in Petrograd (soon thereafter renamed Leningrad). After the Congress, Vygotsky met with Alexander Luria and with his help received an invitation to become a research fellow at the Psychological Institute in Moscow, which was under the direction of Konstantin Kornilov. Vygotsky moved to Moscow with his new wife, Roza Smekhova, with whom he would have two children. He began his career at the Psychological Institute as a "staff scientist, second class". He also became a secondary school teacher, covering a period marked by his interest in the processes of learning and the role of language in learning.

By the end of 1925, Vygotsky completed his dissertation, "The Psychology of Art", which was not published until the 1960s, and a book, "Pedagogical Psychology", which apparently drew on lecture notes he prepared in Gomel while he was a psychology instructor at local educational establishments. In the summer of 1925, he made his first and only trip abroad to a London congress on the education of the deaf. Upon return to the Soviet Union, he was hospitalized due to tuberculosis and would remain an invalid and out of work until the end of 1926.

After his release from the hospital, Vygotsky did theoretical and methodological work on the crisis in psychology, but never finished the draft of the manuscript and interrupted his work on it around mid-1927. The manuscript was published later with notable editorial interventions and distortions in 1982 and was presented by the editors as one of the most important of Vygotsky's works. In this early manuscript, Vygotsky argued for the formation of a general psychology that could unite the naturalist objectivist strands of psychological science with the more philosophical approaches of Marxist orientation. However, he also harshly criticized those of his colleagues who attempted to build a "Marxist Psychology" as an alternative to the naturalist and philosophical schools. He argued that if one wanted to build a truly Marxist psychology, there were no shortcuts to be found by merely looking for applicable quotes in the writings of Marx. Rather, one should look for a methodology that was in accordance with the Marxian spirit.

From 1926 to 1930, Vygotsky worked on a research program investigating the development of higher psychological functions, i.e. culturally-governed lower psychological functions such as voluntary attention, selective memory, object-oriented action, and decision making. During this period, he gathered a group of collaborators including Alexander Luria, Boris Varshava, Alexei Leontiev, Leonid Zankov, and several others. Vygotsky guided his students in researching this phenomenon from three different perspectives:

- The instrumental approach, which aimed to understand the ways humans use objects as mediation aids in memory and reasoning;
- A developmental approach, focused on how children acquire higher cognitive functions during development; and
- A culture-historical approach, studying how social and cultural patterns of interaction shape forms of mediation and developmental trajectories.

== Death ==
Vygotsky died of a relapse of tuberculosis on June 11, 1934, at the age of 37, in Moscow. One of Vygotsky's last private notebook entries was:

This is the final thing I have done in psychology – and I will like Moses, die at the summit, having glimpsed the promised land but without setting foot on it. Farewell, dear creations. The rest is silence.

The urn containing Vygotsky's ashes was buried, in section 3 of Moscow's Novodevichy Cemetery.

== Chronology of the most important events of life and career ==
1922–24 – working in the psychological laboratory which he organized in Gomel Pedagogical College;

January 1924 – meeting Luria at the II Psychoneurological Congress in Petrograd, moving from Gomel to Moscow, enrolling in graduate school and taking a position at the State Institute of Experimental Psychology in Moscow;

July 1924 – beginning work as the head of the sub-department of the education of physically and intellectually disabled children in the department of social and legal protection of minors (SPON);

November 1924 – during II Congress of the Social and Legal Protection of Minors in Moscow, a turn of Soviet defectology to social education was officially announced and collection of articles and materials edited by Vygotsky "Issues of the upbringing of blind, deaf and mentally retarded children" was published;

May 9, 1925 – the birth of their first daughter, Gita;

Summer of 1925 – the only trip abroad: went to London for a defectology conference; on the way passed through Germany, where he met with German psychologists;

November 5, 1925 – Vygotsky, in absence (due to illness), was awarded the title of senior researcher, equivalent to the modern degree of candidate of sciences for defense of the dissertation "Psychology of Art". The contract for the publication of The Psychology of Art was signed on November 9, 1925, but the text was published only in 1965;

November 21, 1925 to May 22, 1926 – hospitalization in the Zakharyino sanatorium-type hospital due to tuberculosis; upon discharge qualified as a disabled person until the end of the year;

1926 – Vygotsky's first book, Pedagogical Psychology, was published; writes notes and essays that would be published years later under the title "The Historical Meaning of the Psychological Crisis";

1927 – resumes work at the RANION Institute of Experimental Psychology and in a number of other institutions in Moscow and Leningrad;

September 17, 1927 – approved as a professor by the scientific and pedagogical section of the State Academic Council (SUS);

December 19, 1927 – appointed as the head of the Medical and Pedagogical Station of the Glavsotsvos of the People's Commissariat of Education of the RSFSR, remained in this position until October 1928 (dismissed on his own will);

December 28, 1927 to January 4, 1928 – First All-Russian Pedological Congress, Moscow: Vygotsky works as co-editor of the section on difficult childhood, and also presents two reports: "The development of a difficult child and its study" and "Instrumental method in pedology"; these two articles together with Zankov's report "Principles for the construction of complex programs of an auxiliary school from a pedological point of view" and Luria "On the methodology of instrumental-psychological research" become the first public presentation of "Instrumental Psychology" as a research method associated with the names of Vygotsky and Luria;

1928 – Vygotsky's second book "Pedology of School Age" was published, along with a number of articles establishing "Instrumental Psychology" approach in Russian and English language journals;

December 1928 – after a conflict with the director of the Institute of Experimental Psychology (GIEP) K. N. Kornilov, the research activities of the Vygotsky-Luria group were curtailed in this organization, and experimental research was transferred to the Academy of Communications.

1929 – freelance scientific consultant, head of psychological laboratories at the Experimental Defectological Institute (transformed Medical-pedagogical station)

== Major themes of research ==
Vygotsky was a pioneering psychologist with interests in extremely diverse fields: his work covered topics such as the origin and the psychology of art, development of higher mental functions, philosophy of science and the methodology of psychological research, the relation between learning and human development, concept formation, interrelation between language and thought development, play as a psychological phenomenon, learning disabilities, and abnormal human development (or defectology). His philosophical framework includes interpretations of the cognitive role of mediation tools, as well as the re-interpretation of well-known concepts in psychology such as internalization of knowledge. Vygotsky introduced the notion of zone of proximal development, a metaphor capable of describing the potential of human cognitive development.

His most important and widely-known contribution is his theory for the development of "higher psychological functions", which emerge through unification of interpersonal connections and actions taken within a given sociocultural environment (i.e. language, culture, society, and tool use). It was during this period that he identified the play of young children as their "leading activity", which he understood as the main source of preschoolers' psychological development and he viewed as an expression of an inseparable unity of emotional, volitional, and cognitive development.

Vygotsky never met Jean Piaget but had read a number of his works and agreed on some of his perspectives on learning. At some point (around 1929–1930), Vygotsky came to disagree with Piaget's understanding of learning and development and held a different theoretical position from Piaget on the topic of inner speech. Piaget thought that egocentric speech follows from inner speech and "dissolved away" as children matured, but Vygotsky showed that egocentric speech became inner speech, which was then called "thoughts".

=== Cultural-historical theory ===
The hypothesis put forward by Vygotsky was a paradigm shift in psychology. He was the first to propose that all psychological functions that govern mental, cognitive, and physical actions of the individual are not immutable but have a history of cultural development (in human history and in everyone personally) through interiorization of cultural tools. Therefore, the process of transformation that is happening when current cultural tools are interiorized becomes the focus of psychological research:

Formerly, it was assumed that the function exists in the individual in a ready, semi-ready, or rudimentary form and in the group it unfolds, becomes complex, advances, is enriched, or, conversely, is inhibited, suppressed, etc. At present, we have a basis for assuming that in relation to higher mental functions, the matter must be presented as being quite the opposite. Functions initially are formed in the group in the form of relations of the children, then they become mental functions of the individual. Specifically, formerly it was thought that every child was capable of reflection reaching conclusions, proving, finding bases for whatever position. From the collision of such reflections, argument was generated. But the matter is actually something else. Studies show that reflection is generated from argument. The study of all other mental functions brings us to the same conclusion.

=== Cultural mediation and internalization ===
Vygotsky studied child development and the significant roles of cultural mediation and interpersonal communication. He observed how higher mental functions developed through these interactions, and also represented the shared knowledge of a culture. This process is known as internalization. Internalization may be understood in one respect as "knowing how". For example, the practices of riding a bicycle or pouring a cup of milk, initially, are outside and beyond the child. The mastery of the skills needed for performing these practices occurs through the activity of the child within society. A further aspect of internalization is appropriation, in which children take tools and adapt them to personal use, perhaps using them in unique ways. Internalizing the use of a pencil allows the child to use it very much for personal ends rather than drawing exactly what others in society have drawn previously:

The child acts and speaks at the same time, both are intertwined in one continuous operation for him. In this way, a blend of speech and action arises, a peculiar mixture from an adult's point of view, but a completely natural state for the child, who from the very first days of life, due to his helplessness, finds himself in conditions where the path from him to things and from things to him goes through another person.

=== Zone of proximal development ===
The "zone of proximal development" (ZPD) is a term that Vygotsky used to characterize an individual's mental development. The zone is bracketed by the learner's current ability and the ability they can achieve with the aid of an instructor of some capacity. The ZPD multidimensional model states that the ideas of the zone of proximal development can be applied to development in other areas of life such as personality development.

==== Scaffolding ====
According to Vygotsky, through the assistance of a more knowledgeable other, a child is able to learn skills or aspects of a skill that go beyond their actual developmental or maturational level. This assistance is defined as 'scaffolding'. The lower limit of the ZPD is the level of skill reached by the child working independently (also referred to as the child's developmental level). The upper limit is the level of potential skill that the child is able to reach with the assistance of a more capable instructor. In this sense, the ZPD provides a prospective view of cognitive development, as opposed to a retrospective view that characterizes development in terms of a child's independent capabilities. The advancement through and the attainment of the upper limit of the ZPD are limited by the instructional and scaffolding-related capabilities of the more knowledgeable other (MKO). The MKO is typically assumed to be an older, more experienced teacher or parent but often can be a learner's peer or someone their junior. The MKO need not even be a person but can be a machine or book or other source of visual and/or audio input.

Another significant property of the ZPD and scaffolding is reciprocal teaching during which the child and the instructor have an open dialogue with each other for the child to create new opportunities to acquire new information and ideas.

==== Importance of play ====
Play is crucial to the social cognitive development of children and, according to Vygotsky, because of the social rules that they must follow.

=== Thinking and Speech ===
In the last years of his life, Vygotsky paid most of his attention to the study of the relationship between thought and word in the structure of consciousness. The problem was explored in Vygotsky's book, Thinking and Speech, which was published posthumously in 1934.

But since we wanted to express all this in one short formula, in one sentence, we might put it thus: if at the beginning of development there stands the act, independent of the word, then at the end of it there stands the word which becomes the act, the word which makes man's action free.

== Legacy ==
=== Soviet Union ===
Following a decade of increased repression of psychology that did not draw overt inspiration from Marx and Lenin, in 1936 the Communist Party condemned "pedology" (that is, developmental psychology). Vygotsky's early death coincided with Joseph Stalin's Great Purge; Kozulin notes that "Vygotsky's theory, which had been severely criticized before, then became a real heresy". After Stalin's death in 1953, Kozulin notes that "it became fashionable to be considered his [Vygotsky's] disciple", with a first collection of major texts published in 1956.

A small group of his collaborators and students were able to continue his lines of thought in research. The members of the group laid a foundation for the systematic development of Vygotskian psychology in such diverse fields as the psychology of memory (P. Zinchenko), perception, sensation, and movement (Zaporozhets, Asnin, A. N. Leont'ev), personality (Lidiya Bozhovich, Asnin, A. N. Leont'ev), will and volition (Zaporozhets, A. N. Leont'ev, P. Zinchenko, L. Bozhovich, Asnin), psychology of play (G. D. Lukov, Daniil El'konin) and psychology of learning (P. Zinchenko, L. Bozhovich, D. El'konin), as well as the theory of step-by-step formation of mental actions (Pyotr Gal'perin), general psychological activity theory (A. N. Leont'ev) and psychology of action (Zaporozhets). Andrey Puzyrey elaborated the ideas of Vygotsky in respect of psychotherapy and even in the broader context of deliberate psychological intervention (psychotechnique), in general.

=== United States ===
Only a couple of Vygotsky's texts were published in English before the translation of Thinking and Speech in 1962. Since then, the majority of his texts have been translated, and his ideas have become influential in some modern educational approaches. One of the first proponents of Vygotsky in the USA was Michael Cole.

=== United Kingdom ===
The British philosopher Andy Clark has introduced Vygotsky's concept of scaffolding to the Extended mind thesis according to which cognitive problems are often solved by reliance on external environmental structure.

== Works ==
- Consciousness as a problem in the Psychology of Behavior, 1925
- Educational Psychology, 1926
- Historical meaning of the crisis in Psychology, unfinished and aborted in 1927
- The Problem of the Cultural Development of the Child, 1929
- The Fundamental Problems of Defectology, 1929
- The Socialist alteration of Man, 1930
- Ape, Primitive Man, and Child: Essays in the History of Behaviour, A. R. Luria and L. S. Vygotsky, 1930
- Tool and symbol in child development, c.1930
- Paedology of the Adolescent, 1929–1931
- Play and its role in the Mental development of the Child, oral presentation 1933
- Thinking and Speech, 1934 (titled as Thought and Language in some translations)
- The Psychology of Art, 1971 (English translation by MIT Press)
- Mind in Society: The Development of Higher Psychological Processes, 1978 (Harvard University Press)
- The Collected Works of L. S. Vygotsky, 1987

== See also ==
- Cognitivism (learning theory)
- Cultural-Historical Activity Theory (CHAT)
- Laboratory of Comparative Human Cognition (LCHC)
- Leading Activity
- Organization Workshop
- PsyAnima, Dubna Psychological Journal
- Social constructivism
- Vygotsky Circle
