= Cultural-historical psychology =

Branch of psychology

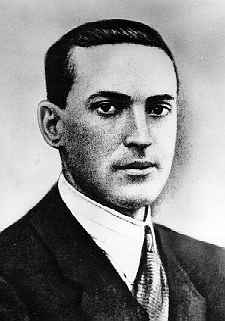
Lev Vygotsky (1896–1934)

Cultural-historical psychology is a branch of psychological theory and practice associated with Lev Vygotsky and Alexander Luria and their Circle, who initiated it in the mid-1920s–1930s. The phrase "cultural-historical psychology" never occurs in the writings of Vygotsky, and was subsequently ascribed to him by his critics and followers alike, yet it is under this title that this intellectual movement is now widely known. The main goal of Vygotsky–Luria project was the establishment of a "new psychology" that would account for the inseparable unity of mind, brain and culture in their development (and/or degradation) in concrete socio-historical settings (in case of individuals) and throughout the history of humankind as socio-biological species. In its most radical forms, the theory that Vygotsky and Luria were attempting to build was expressed in terms of a "science of Superman", and was closely linked with the pronouncement for the need in a new psychological theory of consciousness and its relationship to the development of higher psychological functions. All this theoretical (mostly, speculative) and experimental empirical work was attempted by the members of the Vygotsky Circle (also referred to as "Vygotsky–Luria Circle").

== Theoretical premises ==
Cultural-historical psychology never existed as such during Vygotsky's lifetime. He never accomplished a developmental theory of his own and, by his own admission, died at the threshold of a new psychological theory of consciousness.

Vygotsky believed in the "new man" that he referred to as a "superman" of the future Communist society and advocated for a psychological theory that would account for the development from the actual level of human development to the potential one of a "superman". To that end, he claimed that the development of "higher psychological functions" are a result of the impact of the society (including, according to Marxist principles, its economic basis and the relations of production) and the culture at large. This idea was well known at least fifty years before Vygotsky, was advocated for by a number of other psychologists, and is frequently discussed under the label of "sociogenesis". In contradistinction to Freud's and Freudian "depth psychology" and the behaviorists (and many others) "surface psychologies" of the average people in their everyday environment, Vygotsky postulated "peak psychology" of his own, which would focus on the highest, "peak" performance of people in their actual life and potential, future "superman" capacity. This "peak psychology" was never accomplished and largely remained an interesting and promising, yet utopian scientific project of considerable interest in the contemporary context of 21st century psychological research.

== The benefits and failings of the theory ==
The larger project of the new psychology of Vygotsky and Luria failed, and no universal integrative theory of human mind and development was built by the time of Vygotsky's death in 1934 or afterwards. However, the earlier intellectual effort and the legacy of the Soviet scholars of the 1920s-1930s produced a range of specialized, loosely-related fields of psychological theory and practice including cultural and child psychology and education (most notably, in the subfields of dynamic assessment (which stems from Vygotsky's speculations on the so-called Zone of proximal development, the ZPD) and the so-called developmental education), neuropsychology, or psycholinguistics. Other notable areas of theory and practice that are in the dialogue with the cultural-historical tradition of Vygotsky and Luria are psychotherapy, theory of art, "dialogical science", cognitive science, semiotics and, in the words of Oliver Sacks, somewhat vague perspective, mindset and philosophy of "romantic science".

== Influences ==
The major influences on cultural-historical psychology were the mechanist neurophysiology of Ivan Pavlov and Vladimir Bekhterev (during the so-called "instrumental period" of the 1920s), philosophy of language and culture of Wilhelm von Humboldt and his followers, socio-economic philosophy of Karl Marx and Friedrich Engels, and, primarily, holistic German-American Gestalt psychology—specifically, the works of Max Wertheimer and Kurt Lewin. The holism of the German-American Gestaltists gradually became the dominant theoretical framework of cultural-historical psychology of Vygotsky and Luria in the 1930s and virtually totally eradicated Vygotsky's physiological mechanism and reductionism of the 1920s.

A few of these earlier influences were subsequently downplayed, misunderstood or even totally ignored and forgotten. Thus, cultural-historical psychology understood as the Vygotsky–Luria project, originally intended by its creators as an integrative and, later, holistic "new psychology" of socio-biological and cultural development should not be confused with later self-proclaimed "Vygotskian" theories and fields of studies, ignorant of the historical roots and the intended breadth and depth of the original proposal and its consistent emphasis on the need in a new theory of consciousness. These include such as sociocultural psychology, socio-historical psychology, activity theory, cultural psychology, or cultural-historical activity theory (CHAT).

== Vygotsky–Luria Circle ==
Vygotsky and Luria informally collaborated with other psychologists, educationalists, medical specialists, physiologists, and neuroscientists. The foundation of the integrative science of the mind, brain, and behavior in their bio-social development, was the main work of the Circle. They incorporated ideas of social and interpersonal relations, the practices of empirical scientific research, and "Stalinist science" founded on the discursive practices of Soviet science in the 1930s. There were around three dozen people involved in the research for Vygotsky's theory, at different periods of time.

In 1924, the Circle was formed in Moscow after Vygotsky moved there from Gomel, Belarus. At the Institute of Psychology he met Zankov, Solv'ev, Sakharov, and Varshava, as well as Alexander Luria, with whom he would go on to collaborate with.

The group grew at a gradual rate and all research was conducted in Moscow, Kharkov, and Leningrad, located in the Soviet Union. When the Soviet Union was invaded by Germany during the Great Patriotic War (1941), the group disbanded and any further post-Vygotskian research after the beginning of World War II, was conducted by Luria, Leontiev, Zankov, and Elkonin.

== See also ==
- Critical psychology
- Cultural-historical activity theory
- Constructivism (learning theory)
- Leading activity
- Dynamic assessment
- Zone of proximal development
- Sociogenesis
