= Leading activity =

In the framework of the Cultural-Historical Activity Theory (CHAT) the leading activity is the activity, or cooperative human action, which plays the most essential role in child development during a given developmental period. Although many activities may play a role in a child's development at any given time, the leading activity is theorized to be the type of social interaction that is most beneficial in terms of producing major developmental accomplishments, and preparing the child for the next period of development. Through engaging in leading activities, a child develops a wide range of capabilities, including emotional connection with others, motivation to engage in more complex social activities, the creation of new cognitive abilities, and the restructuring of old ones (Bodrova & Leong 2007: 98).

The term "leading activity" was first used by Lev Vygotsky (1967: 15–17) in describing sociodramatic play as the leading activity and source of development of preschoolers, but it was not systematically incorporated into Vygotsky's theory of child development. Later, however, Alexei Leontiev and other "neo-Vygotskians" such as Alexander Zaporozhets and Daniel Elkonin (Zaporozhets 1997; Zaporozhets & Elkonin 1971) made the concept a fundamental element of their activity theory of child development. The concept has now been extended to several stages or periods in human development.

The notion of a the leading activity is part of a broader theory of activity that attempts to integrate cognitive, motivational, and social aspects of development. Despite many detailed descriptive accounts of the developmental forms of memory, perception, and cognition in various phases of childhood (e.g. Piaget's work), often missing is an explanation for how or why the child develops these psychological processes (Karpov 2003: 138). The exploration of leading activities seeks to illuminate these questions. Rather than biological maturation or stimulus-response learning, specific types of social activity are seen as generating human development. Because of its attention to causal dynamics, the neo-Vygotskian theory has been called "the most comprehensive approach to the problem of determinants and mechanisms of child development (Karpov 2003: 138)."

== Nature ==
A leading activity is conceptualized as joint, social action with adults and/or peers that is oriented toward the external world. In the course of the leading activity, children develop new mental processes and motivations, which "outgrow" their current activity and provide the basis for the transition to a new leading activity (Kozulin, Gindis, Ageyev, & Miller 2003: 7). In most cases, the emergence of an activity can be seen long before it becomes the leading activity in a child's life (Bodrova & Leong 2007: 99). Adults and more capable peers who instruct or assist children in engaging in the leading activity are said to be providing mediation of the activity, and creating a zone of proximal development, which allows children to perform activities at a higher level than they could perform independently. Mediation of leading activities is theorized to help children develop by acquiring the use of cultural or psychological "tools," which transform children's mental processes.

== Sequence ==
The activity considered leading for any given age or period of development depends on the type of society in which a child develops, and on the particular historical and cultural expectations for children of that age (Bodrova & Leong 2007). Neo-Vygotskians have proposed a sequence of children's optimal leading activities in modern industrialized societies (though leading activities may differ in agrarian or hunter-gatherer societies). Of course, not all children within a particular culture will engage equally in leading activities (or in equal "quality" of activities), which leads to different developmental trajectories and outcomes. For example, children who lack opportunities to engage in rich, well-developed sociodramatic play during their preschool years appear to have greater difficulty with self-regulation and impulse control, characteristics associated with the diagnosis of attention deficit hyperactivity disorder (ADHD) (Bodrova & Leong 2007: 99)

The proposed sequence of leading activities is not strictly determined by biological age, but rather by the typical age-related forms of adult and peer interaction in a given society (Chaiklin 2003: 48). As a result of their historical and cultural specificity, leading activities are subject to change. Different leading activities may develop and be found more beneficial for development within particular societies, leading to a revision or reconceptualization of the most effective leading activities. Karpov (2005) reviews recent empirical findings of Western researchers, which are highly consistent with the neo-Vygotskian analysis of child development through engagement in leading activities.

=== Infancy: emotional communication with caregivers ===
During the first year of life, emotional communication with caregivers is seen as the leading activity and context in which the developmental achievements of infancy occur. Vygotsky saw these interactions as the social foundation that would lead to learning and development in a uniquely human way (Karpov 2005). Primary caregivers establish an emotional dialogue with infants that goes beyond mere diapering and feeding routines. Development of this active, two-way emotional relationship results in what Bowlby (1969) called attachment. This shared activity is the blueprint for future relationships the child will develop, and creates motivation for the child to engage in later forms of shared activity (Leontiev 1978).

Infants' emotional exchanges with caregivers begin with purely emotional exchanges, such as smiling or cooing back and forth, or more physical interactions such as when a baby happily responds to hugging, bouncing, or tickling (Bodrova & Leong 2007). Caregivers generally take the initiative in establishing emotional rapport with infants, and infants move from being relatively passive participants to taking increasingly active roles in these dialogues. It has been found that around the beginning of the second month of life, infants begin smiling in response to their caregivers' smile and voice (Zaporozhets & Markova 1983).

In the third month of life, children begin smiling, gesturing and vocalizing (cooing) when greeting familiar adults. Vygotskians have called this the animation complex and infants soon come to use it proactively to arouse and maintain the attention of a caregiver (Bodrova & Leong 2007). From around three to six months of age, infants use smiles and vocalizations to invite caregivers to engage in emotional exchanges, creating what researchers such as Tronick have called interactional synchrony (Tronick 1989). Parents often use "baby-talk" or "child-directed speech" in response to their children's prelinguistic vocalization (e.g. babbling), and it has been shown that infants respond by modifying their babbling in accordance with the phonological structure present in their caregivers' utterances (Goldstein & Schwade 2008). This sort of vocalized emotional interaction, or what John Locke (2001) has referred to as vocal communion, appears to be linked to attachment and later lexical learning, thus playing a formative role in language development.

During the second half of the first year of life, infant-caregiver interactions expand to include emotional exchanges around objects, and actions on those objects (Bodrova & Leong 2007). For instance, a father may now smile and shake a rattle in response to the baby's smile. Around this time, parents may begin to label objects and talk about the actions they are performing. For infants, these objects become interesting as they are presented through emotional interaction with adults (Karpov 2005). While Piaget believed that infants' sensorimotor manipulation of objects came through spontaneous body movements and exploratory actions, evidence suggests otherwise. Children who were severely deprived of emotional contact did not engage in much object manipulation, even though objects were accessible to them in their cribs (Lisina 1974; Spitz 1946). This supports the Vygotskian assertion of a link between emotional interactions with caregivers and the development of object manipulation and exploratory behavior.

In this new context of emotional communication around objects, infants develop more sophisticated communication tools of gestures and words. Vygotsky (1988) describes how an infant's unsuccessful grasping for an object is assigned social meaning when an adult hands the object to the child. The grasping motion then transforms into pointing, an instrumental gesture communicating to an adult the baby's desire, and perhaps prompting the adult to act on the infant's behalf (Vygotsky 1988). Like gestures, a child's first words are treated as meaningful by the adults, and only later are used by infants to signify objects, people, and actions (Bodrova 2007: 104). A baby may make a random "da da" sound in her father's presence, and happy parents assign these sounds the meaning "Daddy," a meaning which the baby then learns from the parents. Language thus emerges in shared form, with adults initially providing most of the verbal interaction, and children eventually beginning to appropriate and use the tool of language themselves (Bodrova & Leong 2007: 104).

In summary, a positive emotional attitude toward adults is crucial for infants' development, as it leads to a vital interest in what the adult presents to the infant and does in their presence, such as using language and manipulating cultural objects, such as toys (as opposed to mere "natural" objects, such as rocks). As Yuri Karpov (2003: 142) put it, "Figuratively speaking, infants become interested in the external world because it has been presented to them by loved adults." Infants accept adults as mediators of their relations with the world, and show increasing interest in the actions they can perform with cultural tools and objects (Bodrova & Leong 2007). This leads to infants' transition to a new leading activity.

=== Toddlerhood: object-centered joint activity ===
Although infants begin to engage in object manipulations during the first year of life, the nature of these manipulations changes qualitatively during the second year of life, when object-centered joint activity with adults becomes toddlers' leading activity. Though for much of infancy children have been involved with "dyadic" interactions with caregivers, or independent interactions with objects around them, around this time toddlers become centrally engaged in actions that are "triadic" in the sense that they involve the child, the adult, and some object or entity to which they share attention (Tomasello 1999). While working with objects toddlers look where their caregivers look (gaze following), use adults as social reference points (social referencing), and act on objects the way adults act on them (imitative learning) (Tomasello 1999). Toddlers tune into the ways adults are using objects, and use communicative gestures to get adults to tune into them, as well as objects in which they are interested.

Most often in recent Western psychology, the term "joint attention" has been used to describe these various triadic social skills and interactions (Moore & Dunham 1995). This concept appears consistent with Russian psychologists' use of the term "object-centered joint activity" to describe the leading activity for this age period. Although infants are able to independently manipulate objects according to their physical, surface characteristics (e.g. banging a spoon to produce a sound), through adult-child joint activity, children can begin to learn to use objects according to their social, or cultural logic (e.g. using a spoon for eating). In addition, toddlers' more advanced motor ability (e.g. transitioning from crawling to walking) allows them to explore new places and objects, and their hands are more free to handle cultural objects in more complex ways. Through a series of adult demonstrations and joint activities with objects, toddlers come to learn the uses of those objects, for instance that a fork is used to eat, mittens are to put on hands, and a brush is used to brush hair (Bodrova & Leong 2007).

Like Piaget (1963), Vygotsky believed that young children develop sensory-motor thinking, in which they solve problems with objects by using motoric actions and perceptions. Unlike Piaget, however, Vygotsky saw sensorimotor thinking as mediated by other people through shared language and object-activity, rather than the mere maturation of sensorimotor schemas, as Piaget maintained (Bodrova & Leong 2007). Toddlers learn the words for objects and actions that are performed with them, and eventually become capable of generalizing from object to object and from one situation to another. For instance, toddlers learn that different objects can serve the same function (e.g. that one can "drink" from a cup, mug, or bottle) (Bodrova & Leong 2007). In addition, toddlers begin to restructure their perception of the important characteristics of objects. Vygotsky's students Zaporozhet and Venger proposed the concept of "sensory standards" to refer to acquired patterns of perception based in objects' socially important characteristics (Venger 1988). Perceiving culturally designated colors, shapes, and basic tastes are early examples of sensory standards that toddlers' learn through object interactions with adults (e.g. "Hand me the orange block").

An important aspect of toddlers' sensorimotor thinking is that, through joint object-activity with adults, it becomes infused with speech. As psychologist Karl Buhler put it, language is a tool or means for "one to inform the other about the things" (Bühler 1934, as cited in Müller & Carpendale 2000). Vygotsky thought that in toddlerhood, nonverbal sensorimotor thought begins to merge with spoken language, which ultimately leads to the development of verbal thinking (Vygotsky 1962). This language acquisition, in turn, is thought to restructure and develop children's other mental processes during the second and third years of life, including perception, attention, memory, and thinking. Tamis-LeMonda et al. (1996) found that maternal responsiveness to children's vocalizations at 13 months of age were predictive of later language development as well as children's later expression of symbolic play at 20 months. Especially beneficial were those interactions in which the mother directly imitated or expanded on children's verbalizations.

As adult-child object activity moves into the third year of a child's life, children develop the ability to make "object substitutions" (e.g. using a stick to represent a horse, or a banana to represent a telephone); this generally occurs after adults model naming a substitute object after a missing one during joint object activity (Karpov 2005). These object substitutions are theorized to play a role in the development of symbolic thought (Bodrova & Leong 2007). In the course of object-oriented activity with adults, toddlers shift from imitations of actions with objects to imitations of the social roles and relationships behind the actions (e.g. shifting from feeding the doll with a spoon, to imitating the relationship of a mother-daughter, and the care and love associated with it). As adults help toddlers to discover the social roles behind the object actions they engage in (e.g. "You're feeding the baby just like a mommy would"), toddlers gain an increasing interest in adult social relations, which motivates them to take up the next leading activity (Karpov 2005).

=== Early childhood: sociodramatic play ===
From approximately age three to six years, sociodramatic play (or role play) is proposed to be children's leading developmental activity. Sociodramatic play is the exact opposite of what is normally thought of as "free play" when children do whatever they want, free of any rules or social pressure (Karpov 2003: 146). Because of children's interest in the social world of adults, and their inability to take on these complex roles directly (e.g. being a doctor or firefighter), they imitate and explore adult social relations through sociodramatic play (Karpov 2003). In some historical or present traditional societies, however, role play may not be the leading activity during this age period, and children may engage more directly in apprenticeship and adult forms of work (Elkonin 2005a)

Contrary to popular belief, adult mediation is critical in helping to children to achieve what Elkonin (2005b) called "mature" sociodramatic play. This type of play provides the maximum developmental benefit for children, and is characterized by: symbolic representation and symbolic actions; language use to create a pretend scenario; complex interwoven themes; rich multifaceted roles; and an extended time frame (often over several days). Bodrova & Leong (2007: 144–153) detail several ways that adults can enrich children's sociodramatic play, including providing ideas and themes, and helping children plan, coordinate, and monitor their play. It is important that children be exposed to various social roles, situations, and institutions in their schooling and life experiences, in order to have rich material for play. In addition, the importance of "sticking to one's role" in the particular play situation facilitates the play interaction, and allows fertile ground for the development of planning, self-regulation, impulse control, and perspective taking (Bodrova & Leong 2007).

Researchers have cited numerous important developmental achievements generated by sociodramatic play (see summary in Bodrova & Leong 2007). They include: inhibition of impulses and self-regulation through adhering to playing a sociodramatic role; the overcoming of "cognitive egocentrism" by learning to take other points of view through playing various social roles; the development of imagination through voluntarily entering the imaginary situations involved in play; the ability to act on an internal mental plane; the integration of emotions and cognition; further development of object substitutions and symbolic thought; and development of the "learning motive" to continue to grow toward adulthood, which helps to propel children's next leading activity of learning in school (Karpov 2005).

As one illustration of the benefits of play, dramatic role play encourages children to use language to regulate their own behavior and those of other children (to make sure everyone sticks to their dramatic role), and this use of language generalizes to other non-play tasks (Bodrova & Leong 2007). Children talk to themselves aloud while carrying out a task or activity; this is what Piaget called "egocentric speech" (1926), but has more recently come to be known as "private speech." To guide themselves, children often use speech or phrases that they have heard during collaborative action with peers or adults, and sometimes even imitate their caregiver's voice (Luria 1961). There is evidence that the proportion of private speech that children use increases when the task they are engaging in is more difficult or novel; in addition, private speech tends to precede action in these cases, thereby playing a planning function for children (Duncan & Pratt 1997). Vygotsky's experimental data supported the idea that children's private speech originates in social interaction, and later becomes internalized as inner (nonvocal) speech, a tool for verbal thinking, planning, and self-regulation. (Vygotsky 1962)

=== Middle childhood: learning activity in educational settings ===
Learning activity in educational settings is proposed as the leading activity for the period of middle childhood (roughly age 6-12), but authors caution that schooling must be properly organized to have the maximum developmental benefit. For instance, rather than passively waiting for children to reach an appropriate developmental level before teaching certain concepts, as he interpreted Piaget's viewpoint, Vygotsky (1962) proposed that schooling should "march ahead of development and lead it." Furthermore, learning activity should promote the development of "scientific concepts," as opposed to the "spontaneous concepts" of preschoolers developed in everyday life (ibid.). For Vygotsky, scientific concepts (which include the arts, humanities, and social sciences) represent the most advanced and systematic generalizations of human activity, as opposed to more superficial impressions about the world based merely on everyday personal experience (Karpov 2005). An example of a child's spontaneous concept might be that "coins sink in water because they are metal." The scientific concept would be that coins sink in water because their density (mass/volume) is greater than the density of water.

Karpov (2005) emphasizes that children should also learn procedures for when and how to apply scientific knowledge to problem solving and everyday situations, and he gives some examples of this. In predicting whether a piece of wood will float, children can learn to measure the density of the wood and compare this to water's density; they can also learn a second problem-solving strategy of calculating the weight of water the wood displaces, and comparing this to the weight of the wood. Instead of jumping to the conclusion that a whale is a fish because it has fins and lives in the water (spontaneous concept based on superficial observation), they can learn to apply taxonomic principles of biology to see that below the "surface," whales share the criteria of the class "mammals" (air-breathing vertebrates with hair, mammary glands, etc.). Learning scientific concepts has the effect of restructuring children's way of thinking about the world, and leads to what Piaget called "formal-logical thought" (Inhelder & Piaget 1958). This includes the essential developmental ability to solve problems using abstract, theoretical information that goes beyond mere personal experience (Karpov 2003).

For an overview of different types of instruction and their outcomes, from the point of view of neo-Vygotskians, see Arievitch & Stetsenko (2002). A so-called "theoretical learning" approach, based in Vygtosky's cultural-historical theory, has shown promise in promoting formal-logical thought, theoretical reasoning, and other higher mental functions (tool-mediated, intentional, conscious processes) (Stetsenko & Arievitch 2002). These theoretical reasoning capabilities are thought to be crucially important in children's transition to the next leading activity, interaction with peers (Bodrova & Leong 2007; Karpov 2005).

=== Adolescence: interaction with peers ===
Interaction with peers is suggested as the leading activity for adolescents. Although peer interaction has certainly played an important role in children's development up until this point, in the period of adolescence it is theorized to become the leading activity in terms of its motivational importance, and its power in generating adolescent development. Authors point out that adults are still important mediators of adolescents' activity during this period, only less directly than when children were younger (Karpov 2005).

The activity of peer interaction provides opportunities for adolescents to use adult and societal norms, models, and relations in analyzing the behavior of their peers. As they test, master, internalize, and perhaps challenge these social standards, adolescents also come to use them for reflective self-analysis (Karpov 2005). This leads to self-awareness and the formation of what Erik Erikson (1968) called personal identity, a major developmental accomplishment of adolescence that prepares adolescents for the transition to adulthood. This further contributes to the development of formal-logical thinking in adolescents, making them capable of analysis of their feelings, goals and ambitions, morality, history, and their place in society, the existence of which they have just "discovered" (Karpov 2003: 150).

Although Karpov (2005) reviews the ways in which the neo-Vygotskian view of adolescence is highly consistent with recent findings and ideas of Western researchers, there is some controversy over the motive that propels peer interaction as the leading activity of adolescence. This motive has not been clearly defined in the literature, whether it has to do with cognitive advances, a desire to take on more adult roles, or sexual attraction to peers based in the reproductive developments of adolescence (Karpov 2005).

== Extensions ==
The concept of leading activity has been extended conceptually and chronologically (into adulthood) by certain authors, such as Anna Stetsenko and Igor Arievitch, who argue that the self can be understood as a leading activity (Stetsenko & Arievitch 2004). They emphasize that the self is a process of real-life activity that is connected to, and positioned within ongoing societal activities. Rather than residing in the depths of a human "soul," the self is constantly re-enacted and reconstructed. The self engages in practical life tasks and collaborative transformative practices, and contributes to purposefully "changing something in and about the world (including in oneself as part of the world)" (Stetsenko & Arievitch 2004: 494).

== See also ==
- Active learning
- Cultural-Historical Activity Theory (CHAT)
- Aleksei N. Leontiev
- Situated cognition
- Social constructivism (learning theory)
- Lev Vygotsky
