= Pyotr Zinchenko =

Soviet psychologist (1903–1969)

Petr Ivanovich Zinchenko (Russian: Пётр Иванович Зинченко) (12 July 1903 – 17 February 1969) was a Soviet developmental psychologist, a student of Lev Vygotsky and Alexei Leontiev and himself one of the major representatives of the Kharkov School of Psychology. In 1963, Zinchenko founded and headed the department of psychology at Kharkiv University until his death in 1969.

He had one child, Vladimir Petrovich Zinchenko, who later became a psychologist.

== Research ==
The main theme of Zinchenko's research was involuntary memory, studied from the perspective of the activity-approach in psychology. In a series of studies, Zinchenko demonstrated that recall of the material to be remembered strongly depends on the kind of activity directed on the material, the motivation to perform the activity, the level of interest in the material and the degree of involvement in the activity. Thus, he showed that following the task of sorting material in experimental settings, human subjects demonstrate a better involuntary recall rate than in the task of voluntary material memorization.

Zinchenko's pioneering work on involuntary memory became a foundation for the development of Leontiev's activity theory and psychological research on memory in Soviet developmental psychology.

== Major works ==
- Zinchenko, P. I. (1939). O zabyvanii i vosproizvedenii shkol'nyx znanij [On forgetting and remembering academic knowledge]. Kandidat (doctoral) thesis. (О забывании и воспроизведении школьных знаний. In «Научные записки Харьковского педагогического института иностранных языков», 1939; т. I, pp. 189–213; Also in Ильясов, И.И., & Ляудис, В.Л. Хрестоматия по возрастной и педагогической психологии. Работы советских авторов 1918-1945 г. М. 1980)
- Zinchenko, P. I. (1939). Problema neproizvol'nogo zapominaniya (Проблема непроизвольного запоминания. In «Научные записки Харьковского педагогического института иностранных языков», 1939; т. I, pp. 145–187) -- Published in English as --
  - Zinchenko, P. I. (1983–84). The problem of involuntary memory. Soviet Psychology XXII, 55–111.
- Zinchenko, P. I. (1961). Neproizvol'noe zapominanie [Involuntary remembering] (in Russian). Moscow: APN RSFSR. -- Chapter 4 (pp. 172–207) is published in English as --
  - Zinchenko, P. I. (1981). Involuntary memory and the goal-directed nature of activity. In J.V. Wertsch (ed.) The Concept of Activity in Soviet Psychology (pp. 300–340). Armonk, NY: ME Sharpe, Inc.
- Smirnov, A. A. & Zinchenko, P. I. (1969). Problems in the psychology of memory. In M. Cole & I. Maltzman (eds.), A handbook of contemporary Soviet psychology. New York: Plenum Press.

== External sources ==
- Bocharova, S. P. (1978). Problemy psikhologii pamyati v trudakh P. I. Zinchenko [Problems of the psychology of memory in the works of P. I. Zinchenko]. Voprosy psikhologii, 1978, #5. -- In English in Soviet Psychology, 1979, Summer, 17(4), 104–113.
- Sereda, G. K. (1984). O znachenii nauchnogo vklada P. I. Zinchenko v razvitie psikhologii pamyati [The significance of P. I. Zinchenko's contribution to the development of the psychology of memory (On his 80th birthday)]. Voprosy psikhologii, 1984, #6. -- In English in Soviet Psychology, 1994, #2.
- Laktionov & Sereda (1993). Deyatel'nostnaya paradigma i voprosy pamyati v trudakh P. I. Zinchenko [Activity paradigm and memory research in the work of P. I. Zinchenko] . Voprosy psikhologii, 1993, #4.
- Mescheryakov, B. G. (2003). P. I. Zinchenko i psikhologiya pamyati. [P.I. Zinchenko and the psychology of memory]. Voprosy psikhologii, 2003, #4.
