= Aleksei Leontiev =

Soviet developmental psychologist

Aleksei Nikolayevich Leontiev (Russian: Алексе́й Никола́евич Лео́нтьев, IPA: [lʲɪˈonʲtʲjɪf]; February 18, 1903 – January 21, 1979), was a Soviet Russian developmental psychologist and philosopher and a founder of activity theory.

He was born and died in Moscow.

== Biography ==
Aleksei Leontiev's life was closely linked to the Lomonosov Moscow State University (MGU). In 1921, he began his studies at the historical-philological faculty of the university. The historical-philological faculty, at the time, included a Department of Philosophy at which Georgy Chelpanov was teaching psychology, and Leontiev studied psychology with him. In 1924, Leontiev graduated from what became the Faculty of Social Sciences. Leontiev worked with Lev Vygotsky and Alexander Luria from 1924 to 1930, collaborating on the development of Marxist psychology as a response to behaviorism and the focus on the stimulus-response mechanism as an explanation for human behavior. Leontiev left Vygotsky's group in Moscow in 1931, to take up a position in Kharkiv. He continued to work with Vygotsky for some time but, eventually, there was a split, although they continued to communicate with one another on scientific matters (van der Veer and Valsiner, 1991). Leontiev returned to Moscow in 1934. Later, he became the Head of the Psychology Department at the Faculty of Philosophy of Moscow State University. In 1966, Leontiev became the first ever Dean of the newly established Faculty of Psychology at the Moscow State University, where he worked until his death in 1979.

== Scientific work ==
Leontiev's early scientific work was done in the framework of Vygotsky's cultural-historical research program and focused on the exploration of the phenomenon of cultural mediation. Representative of this period is Leontiev's study on mediated memory in children and adults The development of higher forms of memory, 1931.

Leontiev's own research school is based on a thorough psychological analysis of the phenomenon of activity. Systematic development of the psychological foundations of activity theory was started in the 1930s by Kharkiv group of psychologists headed by Leontiev and included such researchers as Zaporozhets, Galperin, Zinchenko, Bozhovich, Asnin, Lukov, etc. In its fullest form, activity theory was subsequently developed and institutionalized as the leading psychological doctrine in the Soviet Union in the post-war period after Leontiev had moved to Moscow and took a position at the Moscow State University.

For Leontiev, the psychological of 'activity' consisted of those processes "that realize a person's actual life in the objective world by which he is surrounded, his social being in all the richness and variety of its forms" (Leontiev 1977). The core of Leontiev's work is the proposal that we can examine human processes from the perspective of their psychological macrostructure in three interrelated units. The stimulating unit is that of activity and motives that drive it. The behavior-orientation unit is that of actions and their associated goals, and the conditional unit is the analysis of operations that serve as means for the achievement of actions goals.

== Works ==
In English

- Problems of the Development of the Mind, 1959 (1st ed.), 1965 (2nd ed.), 1972 (3rd ed.), 1981 (4th ed.); translated in English in 1981:
  - The problem of the origin of sensation (pp. 7–53). In Problems of the Development of the Mind. (Trans. M. Kopylova) Moscow: Progress Publishers
  - An outline of the evolution of the psyche (pp. 156–326). Problems of the Development of the Mind. (Trans. M. Kopylova) Moscow: Progress Publishers.
- Alexei Leont'ev archive @ marxists.org.uk:
  - Activity and Consciousness, 1977
  - Activity, Consciousness, and Personality, 1978
  - The Development of Mind, 1981

In Russian

- Леонтьев А.Н. (1947). Психологические вопросы сознательности учения
- Леонтьев А.Н. (1977). Деятельность. Сознание. Личность (idem)
- Леонтьев А.Н. (2000). Лекции по общей психологии
- Леонтьев А. Н. (1978). Воля
- Леонтьев А. Н. (1986). Проблема деятельности в истории советской психологии

== See also ==
- Cultural-historical activity theory
- Large-group capacitation
- Leading activity
