= Activity theory =

Soviet psychological framework

Activity theory (AT; Russian: Теория деятельности) is an umbrella term for a line of eclectic social-sciences theories and research with its roots in the Soviet psychological activity theory pioneered by Sergei Rubinstein in the 1930s. It was later advocated for and popularized by Alexei Leont'ev. Some of the traces of the theory in its inception can also be found in a few works of Lev Vygotsky. These scholars sought to understand human activities as systemic and socially situated phenomena and to go beyond paradigms of reflexology (the teaching of Vladimir Bekhterev and his followers) and classical conditioning (the teaching of Ivan Pavlov and his school), psychoanalysis and behaviorism. It became one of the major psychological approaches in the former USSR, being widely used in both theoretical and applied psychology, and in education, professional training, ergonomics, social psychology and work psychology.

Activity theory is more of a descriptive meta-theory or framework than a predictive theory. It considers an entire work/activity system (including teams, organizations, etc.) beyond just one actor or user. It accounts for environment, history of the person, culture, role of the artifact, motivations, and complexity of real-life activity. One of the strengths of AT is that it bridges the gap between the individual subject and the social reality—it studies both through the mediating activity. The unit of analysis in AT is the concept of object-oriented, collective and culturally mediated human activity, or activity system. This system includes the object (or objective), subject, mediating artifacts (signs and tools), rules, community and division of labor. The motive for the activity in AT is created through the tensions and contradictions within the elements of the system. According to ethnographer Bonnie Nardi, a leading theorist in AT, activity theory "focuses on practice, which obviates the need to distinguish 'applied' from 'pure' science—understanding everyday practice in the real world is the very objective of scientific practice. ... The object of activity theory is to understand the unity of consciousness and activity." Sometimes called "Cultural-Historical Activity Theory", this approach is particularly useful for studying a group that exists "largely in virtual form, its communications mediated largely through electronic and printed texts." Cultural-Historical Activity Theory has accordingly also been applied to genre theory within writing studies to consider how quasi-stabilized forms of communication regularize relations and work while forming communally shared knowledge and values in both educational and workplace settings.

AT is particularly useful as a lens in qualitative research methodologies (e.g., ethnography, case study). AT provides a method of understanding and analyzing a phenomenon, finding patterns and making inferences across interactions, describing phenomena and presenting phenomena through a built-in language and rhetoric. A particular activity is a goal-directed or purposeful interaction of a subject with an object through the use of tools. These tools are exteriorized forms of mental processes manifested in constructs, whether physical or psychological. As a result, the notion of tools in AT is broad and can involve stationary, digital devices, library materials, or even physical meeting spaces. AT recognizes the internalization and externalization of cognitive processes involved in the use of tools, as well as the transformation or development that results from the interaction.

== History ==
The origins of activity theory can be traced to several sources, which have subsequently given rise to various complementary and intertwined strands of development. This account will focus on three of the most important of these strands. The first is associated with the Moscow Institute of Psychology and in particular the "troika" of young Russian researchers, Vygotsky, Leont'ev and Luria. Vygotsky founded cultural-historical psychology, a field that became the basis for modern AT; Leont'ev, one of the principal founders of activity theory, both developed and reacted against Vygotsky's work. Leont'ev's formulation of general activity theory is currently a strong influence in post-Soviet developments in AT, which have largely been in social-scientific, organizational, and writing-studies rather than psychological research and organization.

The second major line of development within activity theory involves Russian scientists, such as P. K. Anokhin and Nikolai Bernstein, more directly concerned with the neurophysiological basis of activity; its foundation is associated with the Soviet philosopher of psychology Sergei Rubinstein. This work was subsequently developed by researchers such as Pushkin, Zinchenko & Gordeeva, Ponomarenko, Zarakovsky and others, and is currently most well known through the work on systemic-structural activity theory being carried out by G. Z. Bedny and his associates, including a focus on the application of this theory as well as other related theories.

Finally, in the Western world, discussions and use of AT are primarily framed within the Scandinavian activity theory strand, developed by Yrjö Engeström.

=== Russian ===
After Vygotsky's early death, Leont'ev became the leader of the research group nowadays known as the Kharkov School of Psychology and extended Vygotsky's research framework in significantly new ways. Leont'ev first examined the psychology of animals, looking at the different degrees to which animals can be said to have mental processes. He concluded that Pavlov's reflexionism was not a sufficient explanation of animal behaviour and that animals have an active relation to reality, which he called "activity". In particular, the behaviour of higher primates such as chimpanzees could only be explained by the ape's formation of multi-phase plans using tools.

Leont'ev then progressed to humans and pointed out that people engage in "actions" that do not in themselves satisfy a need, but contribute towards the eventual satisfaction of a need. Often, these actions only make sense in a social context of a shared work activity. This led him to a distinction between "activities", which satisfy a need, and the "actions" that constitute the activities. Leont'ev also argued that the activity in which a person is involved is reflected in their mental activity; that is (as he puts it) material reality is "presented" to consciousness, but only in its vital meaning or significance.

Activity theory also influenced the development of organizational-activity game as developed by Georgy Shchedrovitsky.

=== Scandinavian ===
AT remained virtually unknown outside the Soviet Union until the mid-1980s, when it was picked up by Scandinavian researchers. The first international conference on activity theory was not held until 1986. The earliest non-Soviet paper cited by Nardi is a 1987 paper by Yrjö Engeström: "Learning by expanding". This resulted in a reformulation of AT. Kuutti notes that the term "activity theory" "can be used in two senses: referring to the original Soviet tradition or referring to the international, multi-voiced community applying the original ideas and developing them further."

The Scandinavian AT school of thought seeks to integrate and develop concepts from Vygotsky's Cultural-historical psychology and Leont'ev's activity theory with Western intellectual developments such as Cognitive Science, American Pragmatism, Constructivism, and Actor-Network Theory. It is known as Scandinavian activity theory. Work in the systems-structural theory of activity is also being carried on by researchers in the US and UK.

Some of the changes are a systematisation of Leont'ev's work. Although Leont'ev's exposition is clear and well structured, it is not as well-structured as the formulation by Yrjö Engeström. Kaptelinin remarks that Engeström "proposed a scheme of activity different from that by Leont'ev; it contains three interacting entities—the individual, the object and the community—instead of the two components—the individual and the object—in Leont'ev's original scheme."

Some changes were introduced, apparently by importing notions from human–computer interaction theory. For instance, the notion of rules, which is not found in Leont'ev, was introduced. Also, the notion of collective subject was introduced in the 1970s and 1980s (Leont'ev refers to "joint labour activity", but only has individuals, not groups, as activity subjects).

== Theory ==
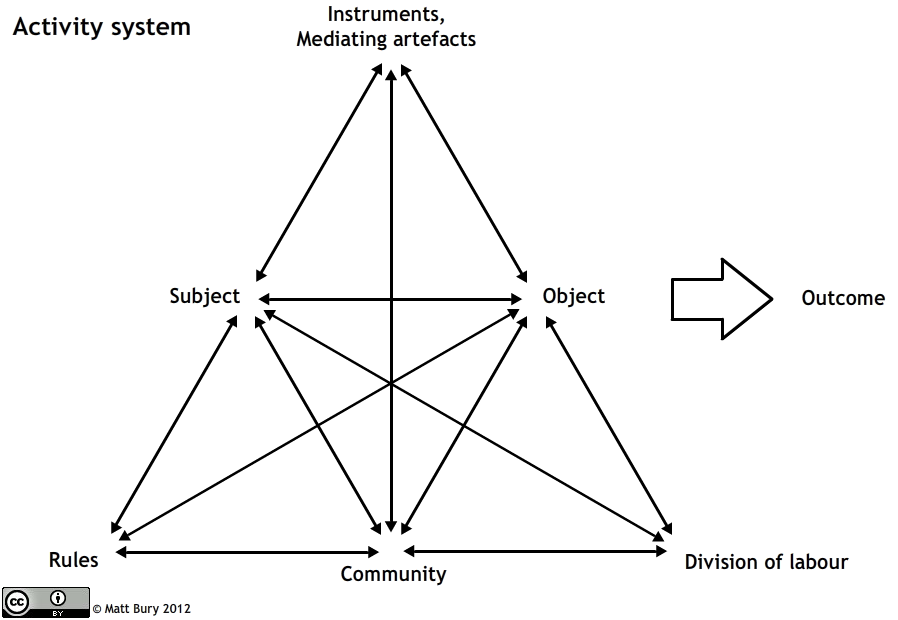
Activity system diagram

The goal of activity theory is understanding the mental capabilities of a single individual. However, it rejects the isolated individuals as insufficient unit of analysis, analyzing the cultural and technical aspects of human actions.

Activity theory is most often used to describe actions in a socio-technical system through six related elements (Bryant et al. as defined by Leonti'ev 1981 and redefined in Engeström 1987) of a conceptual system expanded by more nuanced theories:

- Object-orientedness – the objective of the activity system. Object refers to the objectivity of reality; items are considered objective according to natural sciences but also have social and cultural properties.
- Subject or internalization – actors engaged in the activities; the traditional notion of mental processes
- Community or externalization – social context; all actors involved in the activity system
- Tools or tool mediation – the artifacts (or concepts) used by actors in the system (both material and abstract artifacts). Tools influence actor-structure interactions; they change with accumulating experience. In addition to physical shape, the knowledge also evolves. Tools are influenced by culture, and their use is a way for the accumulation and transmission of social knowledge. Tools influence both the agents and the structure.
- Division of labor – social strata, hierarchical structure of activity, the division of activities among actors in the system
- Rules – conventions, guidelines and rules regulating activities in the system

Activity theory helps explain how social artifacts and social organization mediate social action (Bryant et al.).

== Information systems ==
The application of activity theory to information systems derives from the work of Bonnie Nardi and Kari Kuutti. Kuutti's work is addressed below. Nardi's approach is, briefly, as follows: Nardi (p. 6) described activity theory as "...a powerful and clarifying descriptive tool rather than a strongly predictive theory. The object of activity theory is to understand the unity of consciousness and activity...Activity theorists argue that consciousness is not a set of discrete disembodied cognitive acts (decision making, classification, remembering), and certainly it is not the brain; rather, consciousness is located in everyday practice: you are what you do." Nardi (p. 5) also argued that "activity theory proposes a strong notion of mediation—all human experience is shaped by the tools and sign systems we use." Nardi (p. 6) explained that "a basic tenet of activity theory is that a notion of consciousness is central to a depiction of activity. Vygotsky described consciousness as a phenomenon that unifies attention, intention, memory, reasoning, and speech..." and (p. 7) "Activity theory, with its emphasis on the importance of motive and consciousness—which belongs only to humans—sees people and things as fundamentally different. People are not reduced to 'nodes' or 'agents' in a system; 'information processing' is not seen as something to be modelled in the same way for people and machines."

In a later work, Nardi et al. in comparing activity theory with cognitive science, argue that "activity theory is above all a social theory of consciousness" and therefore "... activity theory wants to define consciousness, that is, all the mental functioning including remembering, deciding, classifying, generalising, abstracting and so forth, as a product of our social interactions with other people and of our use of tools." For Activity Theorists "consciousness" seems to refer to any mental functioning, whereas most other approaches to psychology distinguish conscious from unconscious functions.

Over the last 15 years the use and exploration of activity theory in information systems has grown. One stream of research has focused on technology-mediated change and the implementation of technologies and how they disrupt, change and improve organisational work activity. In these studies, activity systems are used to understand emergent contradictions in the work activity, which are temporarily resolved using information systems (tools) and/or arising from the introduction of information systems. Information science studies use a similar approach to activity theory to understand information behaviour "in context".

In the field of Information and communications technology (ICT) and development (a field of study within information systems), activity theory has also been used to inform development of IT systems and to frame the study of ICT in development settings.

In addition, Etengoff & Daiute have conducted recent work exploring how social media interfaces can be productively used to mediate conflicts. Their work has illustrated this perspective with analyses of online interactions between gay men and their religious family members and Sunni-Muslim emerging adults' efforts to maintain a positive ethnic identity via online religious forums in post 9/11 contexts.

== Human–computer interaction ==
The rise of the personal computer challenged the focus in traditional systems development on mainframe systems for automation of existing work routines. It furthermore brought forth a need to focus on how to work on materials and objects through the computer. In the search for theoretical and methodical perspectives suited to deal with issues of flexibility and more advanced mediation between the human being, material and outcomes through the interface, it seemed promising to turn to the still rather young HCI research tradition that had emerged primarily in the US (for further discussion see Bannon & Bødker, 1991).

Specifically the cognitive science-based theories lacked means of addressing a number of issues that came out of the empirical projects (see Bannon & Bødker, 1991): 1. Many of the early advanced user interfaces assumed that the users were the designers themselves, and accordingly built on an assumption of a generic user, without concern for qualifications, work environment, division of work, etc. 2. In particular the role of the artifact as it stands between the user and her materials, objects and outcomes was ill understood. 3. In validating findings and designs there was a heavy focus on novice users whereas everyday use by experienced users and concerns for the development of expertise were hardly addressed. 4. Detailed task analysis and the idealized models created through task analysis failed to capture the complexity and contingency of real-life action. 5. From the point of view of complex work settings, it was striking how most HCI focused on one user–one computer in contrast to the ever-ongoing cooperation and coordination of real work situations (this problem later led to the development of CSCW). 6. Users were mainly seen as objects of study.

Because of these shortcomings, it was necessary to move outside cognitive science-based HCI to find or develop the necessary theoretical platform. European psychology had taken different paths than had American with much inspiration from dialectical materialism. Philosophers such as Heidegger and Wittgenstein came to play an important role, primarily through discussions of the limitations of AI. Suchman with a similar focus introduced ethnomethodology into the discussions, and Ehn based his treatise on the design of computer artifacts on Marx, Heidegger and Wittgenstein.

The development of the activity theoretical angle was primarily carried out by Bødker and by Kuutti, both with strong inspiration from Scandinavian activity theory groups in psychology. Bannon and Grudin made significant contributions to the furthering of the approach by making it available to the HCI audience. The work of Kaptelinin has been important to connect to the earlier development of activity theory in Russia. Nardi produced the hitherto most applicable collection of activity theoretical HCI literature.

=== Systemic-structural activity theory (SSAT) ===
At the end of the 1990s, a group of Russian and American activity theorists working in the systems-cybernetic tradition of Bernshtein and Anokhin began to publish English-language articles and books dealing with topics in human factors and ergonomics and, latterly, human–computer interaction. Under the rubric of systemic-structural activity theory (SSAT), this work represents a modern synthesis within activity theory which brings together the cultural-historical and systems-structural strands of the tradition (as well as other work within Soviet psychology such as the Psychology of Set) with findings and methods from Western human factors/ergonomics and cognitive psychology.

The development of SSAT has been specifically oriented toward the analysis and design of the basic elements of human work activity: tasks, tools, methods, objects and results, and the skills, experience and abilities of involved subjects. SSAT has developed techniques for both the qualitative and quantitative description of work activity. Its design-oriented analyses specifically focus on the interrelationship between the structure and self-regulation of work activity and the configuration of its material components.

== An explanation ==
This section presents a short introduction to activity theory, and some brief comments on human creativity in activity theory and the implications of activity theory for tacit knowledge and learning.

=== Activities ===
Activity theory begins with the notion of activity. An activity is seen as a system of human "doing" whereby a subject works on an object in order to obtain a desired outcome. To do this, the subject employs tools, which may be external (e.g. an axe, a computer) or internal (e.g. a plan). As an illustration, an activity might be the operation of an automated call centre. As we shall see later, many subjects may be involved in the activity and each subject may have one or more motives (e.g. improved supply management, career advancement or gaining control over a vital organisational power source). A simple example of an activity within a call centre might be a telephone operator (subject) who is modifying a customer's billing record (object) so that the billing data is correct (outcome) using a graphical front end to a database (tool).

Kuutti formulates activity theory in terms of the structure of an activity. "An activity is a form of doing directed to an object, and activities are distinguished from each other according to their objects. Transforming the object into an outcome motivates the existence of an activity. An object can be a material thing, but it can also be less tangible."

Kuutti then adds a third term, the tool, which 'mediates' between the activity and the object. "The tool is at the same time both enabling and limiting: it empowers the subject in the transformation process with the historically collected experience and skill 'crystallised' to it, but it also restricts the interaction to be from the perspective of that particular tool or instrument; other potential features of an object remain invisible to the subject...".

As Verenikina remarks, tools are "social objects with certain modes of operation developed socially in the course of labour and are only possible because they correspond to the objectives of a practical action."

=== Levels ===
An activity is modelled as a three-level hierarchy. Kuutti schematises processes in activity theory as a three-level system.

Verenikina paraphrases Leont'ev as explaining that "the non-coincidence of action and operations... appears in actions with tools, that is, material objects which are crystallised operations, not actions nor goals. If a person is confronted with a specific goal of, say, dismantling a machine, then they must make use of a variety of operations; it makes no difference how the individual operations were learned because the formulation of the operation proceeds differently to the formulation of the goal that initiated the action."

The levels of activity are also characterised by their purposes: "Activities are oriented to motives, that is, the objects that are impelling by themselves. Each motive is an object, material or ideal, that satisfies a need. Actions are the processes functionally subordinated to activities; they are directed at specific conscious goals... Actions are realised through operations that are determined by the actual conditions of activity."

Engeström developed an extended model of an activity, which adds another component, community ("those who share the same object"), and then adds rules to mediate between subject and community, and the division of labour to mediate between object and community.

Kuutti asserts that "These three classes should be understood broadly. A tool can be anything used in the transformation process, including both material tools and tools for thinking. Rules cover both explicit and implicit norms, conventions, and social relations within a community. Division of labour refers to the explicit and implicit organisation of the community as related to the transformation process of the object into the outcome."

Activity theory therefore includes the notion that an activity is carried out within a social context, or specifically in a community. The way in which the activity fits into the context is thus established by two resulting concepts:

- rules: these are both explicit and implicit and define how subjects must fit into the community;
- division of labour: this describes how the object of the activity relates to the community.

=== The internal plane of action ===
Activity theory provides a number of useful concepts that can be used to address the lack of expression for 'soft' factors which are inadequately represented by most process modelling frameworks. One such concept is the internal plane of action. Activity theory recognises that each activity takes place in two planes: the external plane and the internal plane. The external plane represents the objective components of the action while the internal plane represents the subjective components of the action. Kaptelinin defines the internal plane of actions as "[...] a concept developed in activity theory that refers to the human ability to perform manipulations with an internal representation of external objects before starting actions with these objects in reality."

The concepts of motives, goals and conditions discussed above also contribute to the modelling of soft factors. One principle of activity theory is that many activities have multiple motivation ('polymotivation'). For instance, a programmer in writing a program may address goals aligned towards multiple motives such as increasing his or her annual bonus, obtaining relevant career experience and contributing to organisational objectives.

Activity theory further argues that subjects are grouped into communities, with rules mediating between subject and community and a division of labour mediating between object and community. A subject may be part of several communities and a community, itself, may be part of other communities.

=== Human creativity ===
Human creativity plays an important role in activity theory, that "human beings... are essentially creative beings" in "the creative, non-predictable character". Tikhomirov also analyses the importance of creative activity, contrasting it to routine activity, and notes the important shift brought about by computerisation in the balance towards creative activity.

Karl Marx, a sociological theorist, argued that humans are unique compared to other species in that humans create everything they need to survive. According to Marx, this is described as species-being. Marx believed we find our true identity in what we produce in our personal labor.

=== Learning and tacit knowledge ===
Activity theory has an interesting approach to the difficult problems of learning and, in particular, tacit knowledge. Learning has been a favourite subject of management theorists, but it has often been presented in an abstract way separated from the work processes to which the learning should apply. Activity theory provides a potential corrective to this tendency. For instance, Engeström's review of Nonaka's work on knowledge creation suggests enhancements based on activity theory, in particular suggesting that the organisational learning process includes preliminary stages of goal and problem formation not found in Nonaka. Lompscher, rather than seeing learning as transmission, sees the formation of learning goals and the student's understanding of which things they need to acquire as the key to the formation of the learning activity.

Of particular importance to the study of learning in organisations is the problem of tacit knowledge, which according to Nonaka, "is highly personal and hard to formalise, making it difficult to communicate to others or to share with others." Leont'ev's concept of operation provides an important insight into this problem. In addition, the key idea of internalisation was originally introduced by Vygotsky as "the internal reconstruction of an external operation." Internalisation has subsequently become a key term of the theory of tacit knowledge and has been defined as "a process of embodying explicit knowledge into tacit knowledge." Internalisation has been described by Engeström as the "key psychological mechanism" discovered by Vygotsky and is further discussed by Verenikina.

== See also ==
- Active learning
- Activity-centered design
- Anna Stetsenko
- Critical psychology
- Cultural-historical activity theory (CHAT)
- Distributed cognition
- Distributed leadership
- Educational psychology
- Enactivism
- Interaction design
- Leading activity
- Organization Workshop
- Post-rationalist cognitive therapy
- Situated cognition
- Social constructivism (learning theory)

== Sources ==
- Leont'ev, A. Problems of the development of mind. English translation, Progress Press, 1981, Moscow. (Russian original 1947).
- Leont'ev, A. Activity, Consciousness, and Personality
- Engeström, Y. Learning by expanding
- Yasnitsky, A. (2011). Vygotsky Circle as a Personal Network of Scholars: Restoring Connections Between People and Ideas. Integrative Psychological and Behavioral Science, doi:10.1007/s12124-011-9168-5 pdf
- Verenikina, I. & Gould, E. (1998) Cultural-historical Psychology & Activity Theory. In Hasan, H., Gould., E. & Hyland, P. (Eds.) Activity Theory and Information Systems (7–18), Vol. 1.Wollongong: UOW Press

Context and Consciousness: Activity Theory and Human-Computer Interaction (MIT Press, 1996). In the article Activity Theory and Human-Computer Interaction

- Bannon, L. J., & Bødker, S. (1991). "Beyond the Interface: Encountering Artifacts in Use." In J. M. Carroll (Ed.), Designing Interaction: Psychology at the Human–Computer Interface (pp. 227–253). Cambridge University Press.
