= Zone of proximal development =

Concept in educational psychology

In the second circle, representing the zone of proximal development, learners cannot complete tasks unaided, but can complete them with guidance.

The zone of proximal development (ZPD) is a concept in educational psychology that represents the space between what a learner is capable of doing unsupported and what the learner cannot do even with support. It is the range where the learner is able to perform, but only with support from a teacher or a peer with more knowledge or expertise. This person is known as the "more knowledgable other." The concept was introduced, but not fully developed, by psychologist Lev Vygotsky (1896–1934) during the last three years of his life. Vygotsky argued that a child gets involved in a dialogue with the "more knowledgeable other" and gradually, through social interaction and sense-making, develops the ability to solve problems independently and do certain tasks without help. Following Vygotsky, some educators believe that the role of education is to give children experiences that are within their zones of proximal development, thereby encouraging and advancing their individual learning skills and strategies.

== Origins ==
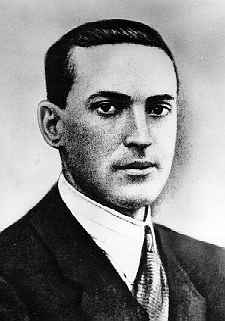
Lev Vygotsky (1896–1934)

The concept of the zone of proximal development was originally developed by Vygotsky to argue against the use of academic, knowledge-based tests as a means to gauge students' intelligence. He also created ZPD to further develop Jean Piaget's theory of children being lone and autonomous learners. Vygotsky spent a lot of time studying the impact of school instruction on children and noted that children grasp language concepts quite naturally, but that math and writing did not come as naturally. Essentially, he concluded that because these concepts were taught in school settings with unnecessary assessments, they were more difficult for learners. Piaget believed that there was a clear distinction between development and teaching. He said that development is a spontaneous process that is initiated and completed by the children, stemming from their own efforts. Piaget was a proponent of independent thinking and critical of the standard teacher-led instruction that was common practice in schools.

Alternatively, Vygotsky saw natural, spontaneous development as important, but not all-important. He believed that children would not advance very far if they were left to discover everything on their own. It is crucial for a child's development that they are able to interact with more knowledgeable others: they are not able to expand on what they know if this is not possible. The term more knowledgeable others (MKO) is used to describe someone who has a better understanding or higher ability level than the learner, in reference to the specific task, idea, or concept. He noted cultural experiences where children are greatly helped by knowledge and tools handed down from previous generations. Vygotsky noted that good teachers should not present material that is too difficult and "pull the students along."

Vygotsky argued that, rather than examining what a student knows to determine intelligence, it is better to examine their ability to solve problems independently and ability to solve problems with an adult's help. He proposed a question: "if two children perform the same on a test, are their levels of development the same?" He concluded that they were not. However, Vygotsky's untimely death interrupted his work on the zone of proximal development, and it remained mostly incomplete.

== Definition ==
When they have guidance and support, learners can accomplish a task that cannot be done by themselves. However, learners can fail even if support is given when the task is totally cognitively impossible.

Since Vygotsky's original conception, the definition for the zone of proximal development has been expanded and modified. The zone of proximal development is an area of learning that occurs when a person is assisted by a teacher or peer with a higher skill set. The person learning the skill set cannot complete it without the assistance of the teacher or peer. The teacher then helps the student attain the skill the student is trying to master, until the teacher is no longer needed for that task.

Any function within the zone of proximal development matures within a particular internal context that includes not only the function's actual level but also how susceptible the child is to types of help, the sequence in which these types of help are offered, the flexibility or rigidity of previously formed stereotypes, how willing the child is to collaborate, along with other factors. This context can impact the diagnosis of a function's potential level of development.

Vygotsky stated that one cannot just look at what students are capable of doing on their own; one must look at what they are capable of doing in a social setting. In many cases students are able to complete a task within a group before they are able to complete it on their own. He notes that the teacher's job is to move the child's mind forward step-by-step (teachers cannot teach complex chemical equations to six-year-olds, for example). At the same time, teachers cannot teach all children equally; they must determine which students are ready for which lessons. An example is the often-used accelerated reading program in schools. Students are assessed and given a reading level and a range. Books rated below their level are easy to read, while books above their level challenge the student. Sometimes students are not even allowed to check out books from the school library that are outside their range. Vygotsky argued that a major shortcoming of standardized tests is that they only measure what students are capable of on their own, not in a group setting where their minds are being pushed by other students.

In the context of second language learning, the ZPD can be useful to many adult users. Prompted by this fact as well as the finding that adult peers do not necessarily need to be more capable to provide assistance in the ZPD, Vygotsky's definition has been adapted to better suit the adult L2 developmental context.

== Scaffolding ==
The concept of the ZPD is widely used to study children's mental development as it relates to educational context. The ZPD concept is seen as a scaffolding, a structure of "support points" for performing an action. This refers to the help or guidance received from an adult or more competent peer to permit the child to work within the ZPD. Although Vygotsky himself never mentioned the term, scaffolding was first developed by Jerome Bruner, David Wood, and Gail Ross, while applying Vygotsky's concept of ZPD to various educational contexts. According to Wass and Golding, giving students the hardest tasks they can do with scaffolding leads to the greatest learning gains.

Scaffolding is a process through which a teacher or a more competent peer helps a student in their ZPD as necessary and tapers off this aid as it becomes unnecessary—much as workers remove a scaffold from a building after they complete construction. "Scaffolding [is] the way the adult guides the child's learning via focused questions and positive interactions." This concept has been further developed by Mercedes Chaves Jaime, Ann Brown, among others. Several instructional programs were developed based on this interpretation of the ZPD, including reciprocal teaching and dynamic assessment. For scaffolding to be effective, one must start at the child's level of knowledge and build from there.

One example of children using ZPD is when they are learning to speak. As their speech develops, it influences the way the child thinks, which in turn influences the child's manner of speaking. This process opens more doors for the child to expand their vocabulary. As they learn to convey their thoughts in a more effective way, they receive more sophisticated feedback, therefore increasing their vocabulary and their speaking skills. Wells gives the example of dancing: when a person is learning how to dance, they look to others around them on the dance floor and imitate their moves. A person does not copy the dance moves exactly, but takes what they can and adds their own personality to it.

In mathematics, proximal development uses mathematical exercises for which students have seen one or more worked examples. In secondary school some scaffolding is provided, and generally much less at the tertiary level. Ultimately students must find library resources or a tutor when presented with challenges beyond the zone.

Another example of scaffolding is learning to drive. Parents and driving instructors guide driving students along the way by showing them the mechanics of how the car operates, the correct hand positions on the steering wheel, the technique of scanning the roadway, etc. As the student progresses, less and less instruction is needed, until they are ready to drive on their own.

The concept of scaffolding can be observed in various life situations and arguably in the basis of how everyone learns. One does not (normally) begin knowing everything that there is to know about a subject. The basics must be learned first so one can build on prior knowledge towards mastery of a particular subject or skill.

== Implications for educators ==
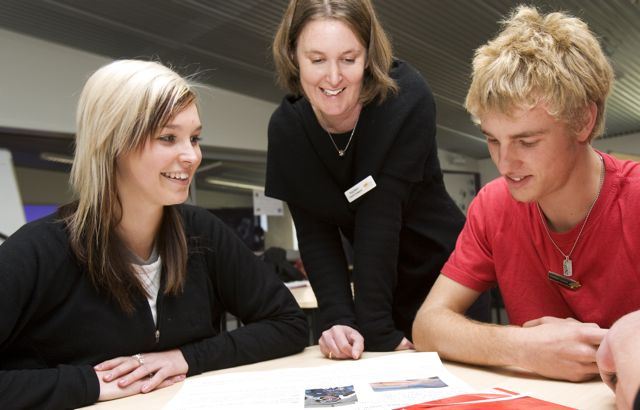
More knowledgeable others, like teachers, parents, and peers helped the learner to understand things that they cannot acquire on their own.

Various investigations, using different approaches and research frameworks have proved collaborative learning to be effective in many kinds of settings and contexts. Teachers should assign tasks that students cannot do on their own, but which they can do with assistance; they should provide just enough assistance so that students learn to complete the tasks independently and then provide an environment that enables students to do harder tasks than would otherwise be possible. Teachers can also allow students with more knowledge to assist students who need more assistance. Especially in the context of collaborative learning, group members who have higher levels of understanding can help the less advanced members learn within their zone of proximal development. In the context of adults, peers should challenge each other in order to support collaboration and success. Utilizing student's ZPD can assist especially with early childhood learning by guiding each child through challenges and using their student collaboration as a tool for success. Meyer used the concepts of Cognitive Evolutionary Pressure and Cognitive Empathetic Resonance to provide a theoretical underpinning for how and why the zone of proximal development arises, and this also has implications for how scaffolding can best be used.

== Challenges ==
Scaffolding in education does have some boundaries. One of the largest hurdles to overcome when providing ample support for student learning is managing multiple students. While scaffolding is meant to be a relatively independent process for students, the initial phase of providing individual guidance can easily be overseen when managing large classrooms. Thus, time becomes a critical factor in a scaffolding lesson plan. In order to accommodate more learners, teachers are often faced with cutting parts of lessons or dedicating less time to each student. In turn, this hastened class time might result in loss of interest in students or even invalid peer-teaching. Cognitive abilities of the student also play a significant role in the success of scaffolding. Ideally, students are able to learn within this zone of proximal development, but this is often not the case. Recognizing students' individual abilities and foundation knowledge can be a challenge of successful scaffolding. If students are evidently less prepared for this learning approach and begin to compare themselves to their peers, their self-efficacy and motivation to learn can be hindered. These hurdles of scaffolding and the zone of proximal development are important to acknowledge so that teachers can find solutions to the problems or alter their teaching methods.

== See also ==
- Comfort zone
- Constructivism (learning theory)
- Cultural-historical activity theory (CHAT)
- Curse of knowledge
- Educational psychology
- Four stages of competence
- Shuhari
- Social constructivism (learning theory)
- Sociocultural theory
- Sociocultural perspective
