= Alexander Zaporozhets =

Soviet developmental psychologist

Aleksandr Vladimirovich Zaporozhets (Russian: Александр Владимирович Запорожец, IPA: [zəpɐˈroʐɨt͡s]; 12 September [O.S. 30 August] 1905, Kyiv, Russian Empire — October 7, 1981, Moscow. Soviet Union) was a Soviet developmental psychologist and a student of Lev Vygotsky and Aleksei Leontiev.

Zaporozhets studied the psychological mechanisms of voluntary movements, perception and action, as well as the development of thought in children. He was one of the major representatives of the Kharkov School of Psychology.

== Representative publications ==
- Zaporozhets, A. V. (1965). The development of perception in the preschool child. In P.H. Mussen (ed.), European Research in Cognitive Development. SRCD 30, no. 2, 82-101
- Zaporozhets, A. & Elkonin, D. (Eds.) (1971). The psychology of preschool children [trans. J. Shybut & S. Simon] (pp. 231–242). Cambridge, MA: MIT Press
- Special issues of the Journal of Russian & East European Psychology, 2002, 40(3 & 4)
