= Interruption science =

Scientific study

Interruption science is the interdisciplinary scientific study concerned with how interruptions affect human performance, and the development of interventions to ameliorate the disruption caused by interruptions. Interruption science is a branch of human factors psychology and emerged from human–computer interaction and cognitive psychology.

Being ubiquitous in life and an intuitive concept, there are few formal definitions of interruption. A commonly agreed upon definition proposed by Boehm-Davis and Remington specifies an interruption is "the suspension of one stream of work prior to completion, with the intent of returning to and completing the original stream of work". Interruptions are considered to be on the spectrum of multitasking and in this context referred to as sequential multitasking. The distinguishing feature of an interruption (see Task switching (psychology), concurrent multitasking) is the presence of primary task which must be returned to upon completing a secondary interrupting task. For instance, talking on the phone while driving is generally considered an instance of concurrent multitasking; stopping a data entry task to check emails is generally considered an instance of an interruption.

Interruptions, in almost all instances, are disruptive to performance and induce errors. Therefore, interruption science typically examines the effects of interruptions in high-risk workplace environments such as aviation, medicine, and vehicle operation in which human error can have serious, potentially disastrous consequences. Interruptions are also explored in less safety-critical workplaces, such as offices, where interruptions can induce stress, anxiety, and poorer performance.

== History ==
The first formal investigation into interruptions was conducted by Zeigarnik and Ovsiankina as part of the Vygotsky Circle in the 1920s. Their seminary research demonstrated the Zeigarnik effect: people remember uncompleted or interrupted tasks better than completed tasks. In the 1940s, Fitts and Jones reported that interruptions were a cause of pilot errors and flying accidents, and made recommendations on reducing these disruptive effects. Additional research in the 1960s and 1970s expanded the study of interruptions into cognitive psychology, with early experiments showing that task switching imposes measurable mental costs and increases error rates. Later, human–computer interaction researchers demonstrated that digital interruptions could degrade working memory and slow task resumption, laying groundwork for modern interruption science.

== Knowledge workers ==
Office workers face a number of interruptions due to information technologies such as e-mail, text messages, and phone calls. One line of research in interruption science examines the disruptive effects of these technologies and how to improve the usability and design of such devices. According to Gloria Mark, "the average knowledge worker switches tasks every three minutes, and, once distracted, a worker can take nearly a half-hour to resume the original task". Mark conducted a study on office workers, which revealed that "each employee spent only 11 minutes on any given project before being interrupted". Kelemen et al. showed that a team of programmers is interrupted through a technical Skype support chat up to 150 times a day, but these interruptions can be reduced by introducing a dispatcher role and a knowledge base.

=== Notifications ===
One of the major challenges associated with increased reliance on information technologies is they will send users notifications, without considering current task demands. Answering notifications impedes task performance and the ability to resume to the original task at hand. In addition, even just knowing that one has received a notification can negatively impact sustained attention.

Several solutions have been proposed to this problem. One study suggested entirely disable email notifications. The down side was it may induce a pressure to constant need to check their email accounts. In fact, entirely removing notifications may lead people to spend more time checking their email. The absence of e-mail notifications is often seen as counterproductive because of the required "catch-up" time periods after a long time between email checking. Alternatively, there are several attempts to design software applications that deliver notifications when there is an identified break from work, or categorize notifications based on their relative importance (e.g. Oasis).

Research has also investigated the effects of relevant interruptions, and found notifications relevant to the current task are less disruptive than if it were unrelated. Overall task performance is most impacted when an instant message is received during fast and stimulus-driven tasks such as typing, pressing buttons, or examining search results.

Bounded deferral is a restricted notification method that entails users waiting a prescribed amount of time before they access a notification to reduce the amount of interruption and decline in productivity. This technique was used in the aim to provide calmer and less disruptive work spaces. If users are busy, alerts and notifications are put aside and delivered only when users are in a position to receive notifications without harming their work. The bounded deferral method has proven to be useful and has the potential to become even more effective on a wider scale, as it has shown how an effective notification system can operate.

== Medicine ==
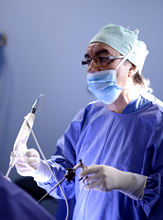
For a surgeon, interruption during an operation could have serious consequences. Yet in some cases, a surgeon may need to be interrupted to make him or her aware of new issues arising with the patient.

In nursing, a study has been conducted of the impact of interruptions on nurses in a trauma center. Another study has been done on the interruption rates of nurses and doctors.

Interruption caused by smartphone use in health-care settings can be deadly. Hence, it may be worthwhile for health care organizations to craft effective cellphone usage policies to maximize technological benefits and minimize unnecessary distraction associated with smartphone use.

== See also ==
- Human multitasking
- Ovsiankina effect
