= Transtheoretical model =

Integrative theory of therapy

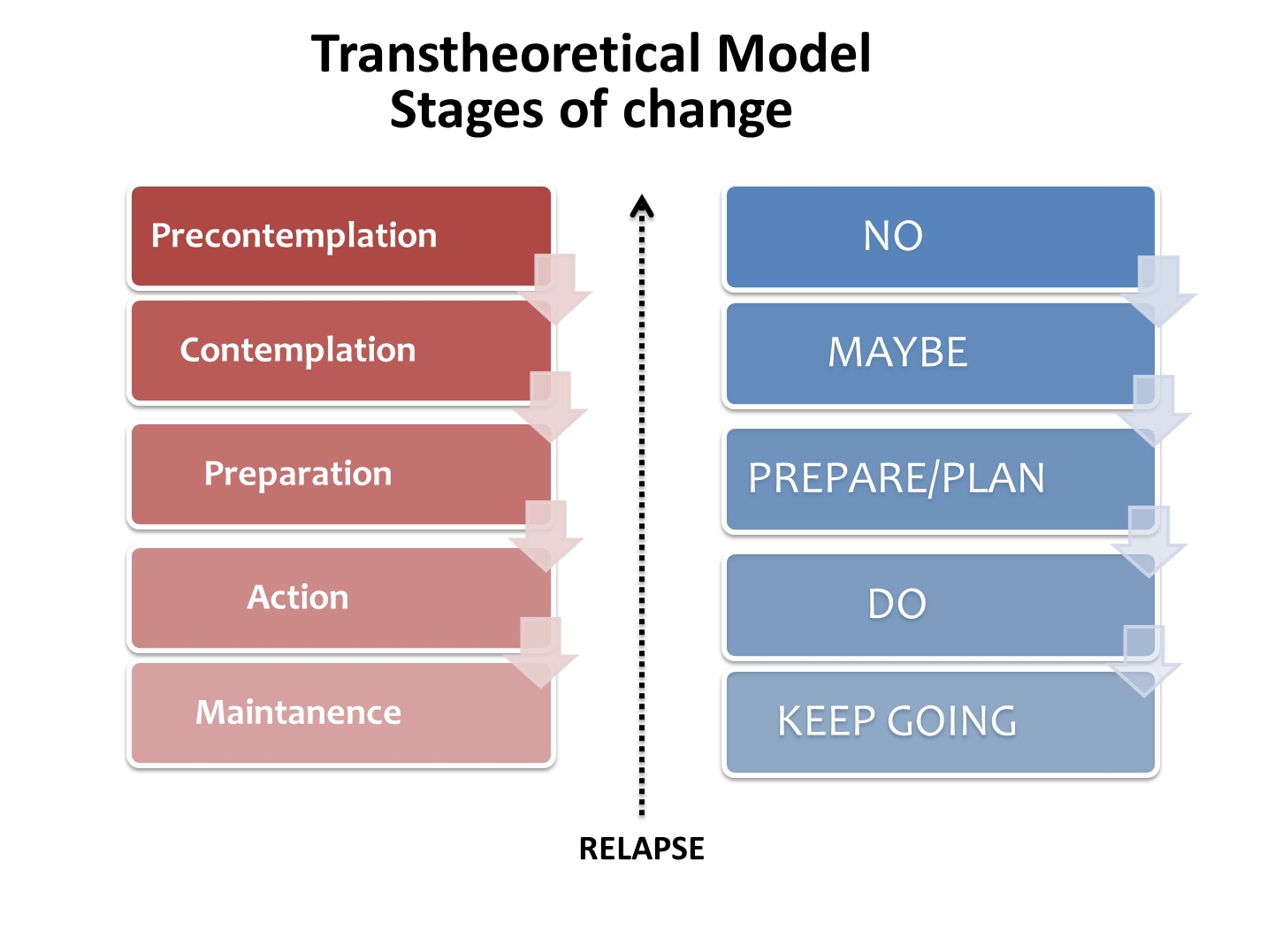
Stages of change, according to the transtheoretical model

The transtheoretical model of behavior change is an integrative theory of therapy that assesses an individual's readiness to act on a new healthier behavior, and provides strategies, or processes of change to guide the individual. The model is composed of constructs such as: stages of change, processes of change, levels of change, self-efficacy, and decisional balance.

The transtheoretical model is also known by the abbreviation "TTM" and sometimes by the term "stages of change", although this latter term is a synecdoche since the stages of change are only one part of the model along with processes of change, levels of change, etc. Several self-help books—Changing for Good (1994), Changeology (2012), and Changing to Thrive (2016)—and articles in the news media have discussed the model. In 2009, an article in the British Journal of Health Psychology called it "arguably the dominant model of health behaviour change, having received unprecedented research attention, yet it has simultaneously attracted exceptional criticism".

== History and core constructs ==
James O. Prochaska of the University of Rhode Island, and Carlo Di Clemente and colleagues developed the transtheoretical model beginning in 1977. It is based on analysis and use of different theories of psychotherapy, hence the name "transtheoretical". Prochaska and colleagues refined the model on the basis of research that they published in peer-reviewed journals and books.

=== Stages of change ===
This construct refers to the temporal dimension of behavioural change. In the transtheoretical model, change is a "process involving progress through a series of stages":

- Precontemplation ("not ready") – "People are not intending to take action in the foreseeable future, and can be unaware that their behaviour is problematic"
- Contemplation ("getting ready") – "People are beginning to recognize that their behaviour is problematic, and start to look at the pros and cons of their continued actions"
- Preparation ("ready") – "People are intending to take action in the immediate future, and may begin taking small steps toward behaviour change" (Note: In the 1983 version of the model, the Preparation stage is absent.)
- Action – "People have made specific overt modifications in modifying their problem behaviour or in acquiring new healthy behaviours"
- Maintenance – "People have been able to sustain action for at least six months and are working to prevent relapse"
- Termination – "Individuals have zero temptation and they are sure they will not return to their old unhealthy habit as a way of coping" (Note: In the 1983 version of the model, the Termination stage is absent. In the 1992 version of the model, Prochaska et al. showed Termination as the end of their "Spiral Model of the Stages of Change", not as a separate stage.)

In addition, the researchers conceptualized "Relapse" (recycling) which is not a stage in itself but rather the "return from Action or Maintenance to an earlier stage". (Note: In the 1983 version of the model, Relapse is considered one of the five stages of change.)

The quantitative definition of the stages of change (see below) is perhaps the most well-known feature of the model. However it is also one of the most critiqued, even in the field of smoking cessation, where it was originally formulated. It has been said that such quantitative definition (i.e. a person is in preparation if he intends to change within a month) does not reflect the nature of behaviour change, that it does not have better predictive power than simpler questions (i.e. "do you have plans to change..."), and that it has problems regarding its classification reliability.

Communication theorist and sociologist Everett Rogers suggested that the stages of change are analogues of the stages of the innovation adoption process in Rogers' theory of diffusion of innovations.

==== Details of each stage ====
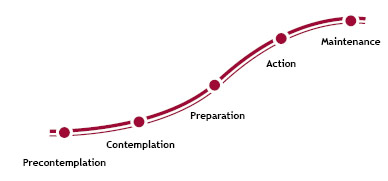
Stages of change in the transtheoretical model

Stage	Precontemplation	Contemplation	Preparation	Action	Maintenance	Relapse
Standard time	more than 6 months	in the next 6 months	in the next month	now	at least 6 months	any time

Stage 1: Precontemplation (not ready)

People at this stage do not intend to start the healthy behavior in the near future (within 6 months), and may be unaware of the need to change. People here learn more about healthy behavior: they are encouraged to think about the pros of changing their behavior and to feel emotions about the effects of their negative behavior on others.

Precontemplators typically underestimate the pros of changing, overestimate the cons, and often are not aware of making such mistakes.

One of the most effective steps that others can help with at this stage is to encourage them to become more mindful of their decision making and more conscious of the multiple benefits of changing an unhealthy behavior.

Stage 2: Contemplation (getting ready)

At this stage, participants are intending to start the healthy behavior within the next 6 months. While they are usually now more aware of the pros of changing, their cons are about equal to their Pros. This ambivalence about changing can cause them to keep putting off taking action.

During this stage, participants envision the kind of person they could be if they changed their behavior and learn more from people who behave in healthy ways.

Others can influence and help effectively at this stage by encouraging them to work at reducing the cons of changing their behavior.

Stage 3: Preparation (ready)

People at this stage are ready to start taking action within the next 30 days. They take small steps that they believe can help them make the healthy behavior a part of their lives. For example, they tell their friends and family that they want to change their behavior.

People in this stage benefit by seeking support from friends they trust, telling people about their plan to change the way they act, and thinking about how they would feel if they behaved in a healthier way. A prominent concern is that if they act they will fail. They learn that the better prepared they are, the more likely they are to keep progressing.

Stage 4: Action (current action)

People at this stage have changed their behavior within the last 6 months and need to work hard to keep moving ahead. These participants need to learn how to strengthen their commitments to change and to fight urges to slip back.

People in this stage progress by being taught techniques for keeping up their commitments such as substituting activities related to the unhealthy behavior with positive ones, rewarding themselves for taking steps toward changing, and avoiding people and situations that tempt them to behave in unhealthy ways.

Stage 5: Maintenance (monitoring)

People at this stage changed their behavior more than 6 months ago. It is important for people in this stage to be aware of situations that may tempt them to slip back into doing the unhealthy behavior—particularly stressful situations.

It is recommended that people in this stage seek support from and talk with people whom they trust, spend time with people who behave in healthy ways, and remember to engage in healthy activities (such as exercise and deep relaxation) to cope with stress instead of relying on unhealthy behavior.

Relapse (recycling)

Relapse in the TTM specifically applies to individuals who successfully quit smoking or using drugs or alcohol, only to resume these unhealthy behaviors. Individuals who attempt to quit highly addictive behaviors such as drug, alcohol, and tobacco use are at particularly high risk of a relapse. Achieving a long-term behavior change often requires ongoing support from family members, a health coach, a physician, or another motivational source. Supportive literature and other resources can also be helpful to avoid a relapse from happening.

=== Processes of change ===
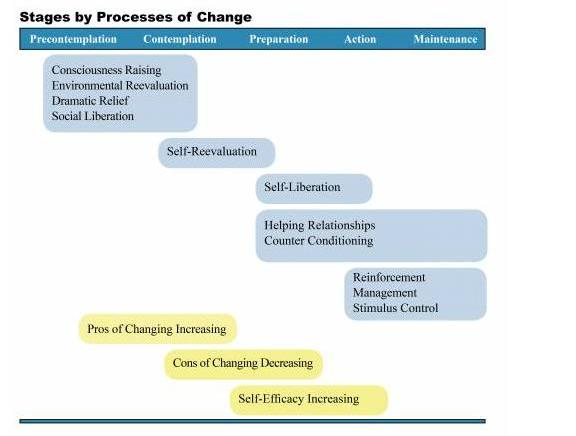
Processes of change

The 10 processes of change are "covert and overt activities that people use to progress through the stages".

To progress through the early stages, people apply cognitive, affective, and evaluative processes. As people move toward Action and Maintenance, they rely more on commitments, counter conditioning, rewards, environmental controls, and support.

Prochaska and colleagues state that their research related to the transtheoretical model shows that interventions to change behavior are more effective if they are "stage-matched", that is, "matched to each individual's stage of change". (Note: In the 1983 version of the model, the processes of change were said to be emphasized in only the Contemplation, Action, and Maintenance stages.)

In general, for people to progress they need:

- A growing awareness that the advantages (the "pros") of changing outweigh the disadvantages (the "cons")—the TTM calls this decisional balance.
- Confidence that they can make and maintain changes in situations that tempt them to return to their old, unhealthy behavior—the TTM calls this self-efficacy.
- Strategies that can help them make and maintain change—the TTM calls these processes of change.

The ten processes of change include:

1. Consciousness-raising (Get the facts) — increasing awareness via information, education, and personal feedback about the healthy behavior.
2. Dramatic relief (Pay attention to feelings) — feeling fear, anxiety, or worry because of the unhealthy behavior, or feeling inspiration and hope when hearing about how people are able to change to healthy behaviors.
3. Self-reevaluation (Create a new self-image) — realizing that the healthy behavior is an important part of who they want to be.
4. Environmental reevaluation (Notice your effect on others) — realizing how their unhealthy behavior affects others and how they could have more positive effects by changing.
5. Social liberation (Notice public support) — realizing that society is supportive of the healthy behavior.
6. Self-liberation (Make a commitment) — believing in one's ability to change and making commitments and re-commitments to act on that belief.
7. Helping relationships (Get support) — finding people who are supportive of their change.
8. Counterconditioning (Use substitutes) — substituting healthy ways of acting and thinking for unhealthy ways.
9. Reinforcement management (Use rewards) — increasing the rewards that come from positive behavior and reducing those that come from negative behavior.
10. Stimulus control (Manage your environment) — using reminders and cues that encourage healthy behavior and avoiding places that don't.

Health researchers have extended Prochaska's and DiClemente's 10 original processes of change by an additional 21 processes. In the first edition of Planning Health Promotion Programs, Bartholomew et al. (2001) summarised the processes that they identified in a number of studies; however, their extended list of processes was removed from later editions of the text, perhaps because the list mixes techniques with processes. There are unlimited ways of applying processes. The additional strategies of Bartholomew et al. were:

1. Risk comparison (Understand the risks) – comparing risks with similar dimensional profiles: dread, control, catastrophic potential and novelty
2. Cumulative risk (Get the overall picture) – processing cumulative probabilities instead of single incident probabilities
3. Qualitative and quantitative risks (Consider different factors) – processing different expressions of risk
4. Positive framing (Think positively) – focusing on success instead of failure framing
5. Self-examination relate to risk (Be aware of your risks) – conducting an assessment of risk perception, e.g. personalisation, impact on others
6. Reevaluation of outcomes (Know the outcomes) – emphasising positive outcomes of alternative behaviours and reevaluating outcome expectancies
7. Perception of benefits (Focus on benefits) – perceiving advantages of the healthy behaviour and disadvantages of the risk behaviour
8. Self-efficacy and social support (Get help) – mobilising social support; skills training on coping with emotional disadvantages of change
9. Decision making perspective (Decide) – focusing on making the decision
10. Tailoring on time horizons (Set the time frame) – incorporating personal time horizons
11. Focus on important factors (Prioritise) – incorporating personal factors of highest importance
12. Trying out new behaviour (Try it) – changing something about oneself and gaining experience with that behaviour
13. Persuasion of positive outcomes (Persuade yourself) – promoting new positive outcome expectations and reinforcing existing ones
14. Modelling (Build scenarios) – showing models to overcome barriers effectively
15. Skill improvement (Build a supportive environment) – restructuring environments to contain important, obvious and socially supported cues for the new behaviour
16. Coping with barriers (Plan to tackle barriers) – identifying barriers and planning solutions when facing these obstacles
17. Goal setting (Set goals) – setting specific and incremental goals
18. Skills enhancement (Adapt your strategies) – restructuring cues and social support; anticipating and circumventing obstacles; modifying goals
19. Dealing with barriers (Accept setbacks) – understanding that setbacks are normal and can be overcome
20. Self-rewards for success (Reward yourself) – feeling good about progress; reiterating positive consequences
21. Coping skills (Identify difficult situations) – identifying high risk situations; selecting solutions; practicing solutions; coping with relapse

While most of these processes and strategies are associated with health interventions such as stress management, exercise, healthy eating, smoking cessation and other addictive behaviour, some of them are also used in other types of interventions such as travel interventions. Some processes are recommended in a specific stage, while others can be used in one or more stages.

=== Decisional balance ===
This core construct "reflects the individual's relative weighing of the pros and cons of changing". (Note: In the 1983 version of the model, "decisional balance" is absent. In the 1992 version of the model, Prochaska et al. mention "decisional balance" but in only one sentence under the "key transtheoretical concept" of "processes of change".) Decision making was conceptualized by Janis and Mann as a "decisional balance sheet" of comparative potential gains and losses. Decisional balance measures, the pros and the cons, have become critical constructs in the transtheoretical model. The pros and cons combine to form a decisional "balance sheet" of comparative potential gains and losses. The balance between the pros and cons varies depending on which stage of change the individual is in.

Sound decision making requires the consideration of the potential benefits (pros) and costs (cons) associated with a behavior's consequences. TTM research has found the following relationships between the pros, cons, and the stage of change across 48 behaviors and over 100 populations studied.

- The cons of changing outweigh the pros in the Precontemplation stage.
- The pros surpass the cons in the middle stages.
- The pros outweigh the cons in the Action stage.

The evaluation of pros and cons is part of the formation of decisional balance. During the change process, individuals gradually increase the pros and decrease the cons forming a more positive balance towards the target behaviour. Attitudes are one of the core constructs explaining behaviour and behaviour change in various research domains. Other behaviour models, such as the theory of planned behavior (TPB) and the stage model of self-regulated change, also emphasise attitude as an important determinant of behaviour. The progression through the different stages of change is reflected in a gradual change in attitude before the individual acts.

Due to the use of decisional balance and attitude, travel behaviour researchers have begun to combine the TTM with the TPB. Forward uses the TPB variables to better differentiate the different stages. Especially all TPB variables (attitude, perceived behaviour control, descriptive and subjective norm) are positively show a gradually increasing relationship to stage of change for bike commuting. As expected, intention or willingness to perform the behaviour increases by stage. Similarly, Bamberg uses various behavior models, including the transtheoretical model, theory of planned behavior and norm-activation model, to build the stage model of self-regulated behavior change (SSBC). Bamberg claims that his model is a solution to criticism raised towards the TTM. Some researchers in travel, dietary, and environmental research have conducted empirical studies, showing that the SSBC might be a future path for TTM-based research.

=== Self-efficacy ===
This core construct is "the situation-specific confidence people have that they can cope with high-risk situations without relapsing to their unhealthy or high risk-habit". (Note: In the 1983 version of the model, "self-efficacy" is absent. In the 1992 version of the model, Prochaska et al. mention "self-efficacy" but in only one sentence under the "key transtheoretical concept" of "stages of change".) The construct is based on Bandura's self-efficacy theory and conceptualizes a person's perceived ability to perform on a task as a mediator of performance on future tasks. In his research Bandura already established that greater levels of perceived self-efficacy leads to greater changes in behavior. Similarly, Ajzen mentions the similarity between the concepts of self-efficacy and perceived behavioral control. This underlines the integrative nature of the transtheoretical model which combines various behavior theories. A change in the level of self-efficacy can predict a lasting change in behavior if there are adequate incentives and skills. The transtheoretical model employs an overall confidence score to assess an individual's self-efficacy. Situational temptations assess how tempted people are to engage in a problem behavior in a certain situation.

=== Levels of change ===
This core construct identifies the depth or complexity of presenting problems according to five levels of increasing complexity. Different therapeutic approaches have been recommended for each level as well as for each stage of change. The levels are:

1. Symptom/situational problems: e.g., motivational interviewing, behavior therapy, exposure therapy
2. Current maladaptive cognitions: e.g., Adlerian therapy, cognitive therapy, rational emotive therapy
3. Current interpersonal conflicts: e.g., Sullivanian therapy, interpersonal therapy
4. Family/systems conflicts: e.g., strategic therapy, Bowenian therapy, structural family therapy
5. Long-term intrapersonal conflicts: e.g., psychoanalytic therapies, existential therapy, Gestalt therapy

In one empirical study of psychotherapy discontinuation published in 1999, measures of levels of change did not predict premature discontinuation of therapy. Nevertheless, in 2005 the creators of the TTM stated that it is important "that both therapists and clients agree as to which level they attribute the problem and at which level or levels they are willing to target as they work to change the problem behavior".

Psychologist Donald Fromme, in his book Systems of Psychotherapy, adopted many ideas from the TTM, but in place of the levels of change construct, Fromme proposed a construct called contextual focus, a spectrum from physiological microcontext to environmental macrocontext: "The horizontal, contextual focus dimension resembles TTM's Levels of Change, but emphasizes the breadth of an intervention, rather than the latter's focus on intervention depth."

== Outcomes of programs ==
The outcomes of the TTM computerized tailored interventions administered to participants in pre-Action stages are outlined below.

=== Stress management ===
A national sample of pre-Action adults was provided a stress management intervention. At the 18-month follow-up, a significantly larger proportion of the treatment group (62%) was effectively managing their stress when compared to the control group. The intervention also produced statistically significant reductions in stress and depression and an increase in the use of stress management techniques when compared to the control group. Two additional clinical trials of TTM programs by Prochaska et al. and Jordan et al. also found significantly larger proportions of treatment groups effectively managing stress when compared to control groups.

=== Adherence to antihypertensive medication ===
Over 1,000 members of a New England group practice who were prescribed antihypertensive medication participated in an adherence to antihypertensive medication intervention. The vast majority (73%) of the intervention group who were previously pre-Action were adhering to their prescribed medication regimen at the 12-month follow-up when compared to the control group.

=== Adherence to lipid-lowering drugs ===
Members of a large New England health plan and various employer groups who were prescribed a cholesterol lowering medication participated in an adherence to lipid-lowering drugs intervention. More than half of the intervention group (56%) who were previously pre-Action were adhering to their prescribed medication regimen at the 18-month follow-up. Additionally, only 15% of those in the intervention group who were already in Action or Maintenance relapsed into poor medication adherence compared to 45% of the controls. Further, participants who were at risk for physical activity and unhealthy diet were given only stage-based guidance. The treatment group doubled the control group in the percentage in Action or Maintenance at 18 months for physical activity (43%) and diet (25%).

=== Depression prevention ===
Participants were 350 primary care patients experiencing at least mild depression but not involved in treatment or planning to seek treatment for depression in the next 30 days. Patients receiving the TTM intervention experienced significantly greater symptom reduction during the 9-month follow-up period. The intervention's largest effects were observed among patients with moderate or severe depression, and who were in the Precontemplation or Contemplation stage of change at baseline. For example, among patients in the Precontemplation or Contemplation stage, rates of reliable and clinically significant improvement in depression were 40% for treatment and 9% for control. Among patients with mild depression, or who were in the Action or Maintenance stage at baseline, the intervention helped prevent disease progression to Major Depression during the follow-up period.

=== Weight management ===
Five-hundred-and-seventy-seven overweight or moderately obese adults (BMI 25-39.9) were recruited nationally, primarily from large employers. Those randomly assigned to the treatment group received a stage-matched multiple behavior change guide and a series of tailored, individualized interventions for three health behaviors that are crucial to effective weight management: healthy eating (i.e., reducing calorie and dietary fat intake), moderate exercise, and managing emotional distress without eating. Up to three tailored reports (one per behavior) were delivered based on assessments conducted at four time points: baseline, 3, 6, and 9 months. All participants were followed up at 6, 12, and 24 months. Multiple Imputation was used to estimate missing data. Generalized Labor Estimating Equations (GLEE) were then used to examine differences between the treatment and comparison groups. At 24 months, those who were in a pre-Action stage for healthy eating at baseline and received treatment were significantly more likely to have reached Action or Maintenance than the comparison group (47.5% vs. 34.3%). The intervention also impacted a related, but untreated behavior: fruit and vegetable consumption. Over 48% of those in the treatment group in a pre-Action stage at baseline progressed to Action or Maintenance for eating at least 5 servings a day of fruit and vegetables as opposed to 39% of the comparison group. Individuals in the treatment group who were in a pre-Action stage for exercise at baseline were also significantly more likely to reach Action or Maintenance (44.9% vs. 38.1%). The treatment also had a significant effect on managing emotional distress without eating, with 49.7% of those in a pre-Action stage at baseline moving to Action or Maintenance versus 30.3% of the comparison group. The groups differed on weight lost at 24 months among those in a pre-Action stage for healthy eating and exercise at baseline. Among those in a pre-Action stage for both healthy eating and exercise at baseline, 30% of those randomized to the treatment group lost 5% or more of their body weight vs. 16.6% in the comparison group. Coaction of behavior change occurred and was much more pronounced in the treatment group with the treatment group losing significantly more than the comparison group. This study demonstrates the ability of TTM-based tailored feedback to improve healthy eating, exercise, managing emotional distress, and weight on a population basis. The treatment produced the highest population impact to date on multiple health risk behaviors.

The effectiveness of the use of this model in weight management interventions (including dietary or physical activity interventions, or both, and also combined with other interventions) for overweight and obese adults was assessed in a 2014 systematic review. The results revealed that there is inconclusive evidence regarding the impact of these interventions on sustainable (one year or longer) weight loss. However, this approach may produce positive effects in physical activity and dietary habits, such as increased in both exercise duration and frequency, and fruits and vegetables consumption, along with reduced dietary fat intake, based on very low quality scientific evidence.

=== Smoking cessation ===
Multiple studies have found individualized interventions tailored on the 14 TTM variables for smoking cessation to effectively recruit and retain pre-Action participants and produce long-term abstinence rates within the range of 22% – 26%. These interventions have also consistently outperformed alternative interventions including best-in-class action-oriented self-help programs, non-interactive manual-based programs, and other common interventions. Furthermore, these interventions continued to move pre-Action participants to abstinence even after the program ended. For a summary of smoking cessation clinical outcomes, see Velicer, Redding, Sun, & Prochaska, 2007 and Jordan, Evers, Spira, King & Lid, 2013.

==== Example for TTM application on smoke control ====
In the treatment of smoke control, TTM focuses on each stage to monitor and to achieve a progression to the next stage.

Stage	Precontemplation	Contemplation	Preparation	Action	Maintenance	Can Relapse to an earlier stage
Standard time	more than 6 months	in the next 6 months	in the next month	now	at least 6 months	any time
Action and intervention	not ready to quit or demoralized	ambivalent	intend to quit	take action and quit	sustained	back to smoke
Related source	Book, newspaper, friend	Book, newspaper, friend	doctor, nurse, friend...	doctor, nurse, friend...	friend, family	temptation, stress, distress

In each stage, a patient may have multiple sources that could influence their behavior. These may include friends, books, and/or interactions with their healthcare providers. These factors could potentially influence how successful a patient may be in moving through the different stages. This stresses the importance to have continuous monitoring and efforts to maintain progress at each stage. TTM helps guide the treatment process at each stage, and may assist the healthcare provider in making an optimal therapeutic decision.

=== Travel research ===
The use of TTM in travel behaviour interventions is rather novel. A number of cross-sectional studies investigated the individual constructs of TTM, e.g. stage of change, decisional balance and self-efficacy, with regards to transport mode choice. The cross-sectional studies identified both motivators and barriers at the different stages regarding biking, walking and public transport. The motivators identified were e.g. liking to bike/walk, avoiding congestion and improved fitness. Perceived barriers were e.g. personal fitness, time and the weather. This knowledge was used to design interventions that would address attitudes and misconceptions to encourage an increased use of bikes and walking. These interventions aim at changing people's travel behaviour towards more sustainable and more active transport modes. In health-related studies, TTM is used to help people walk or bike more instead of using the car. Most intervention studies aim to reduce car trips for commute to achieve the minimum recommended physical activity levels of 30 minutes per day. Other intervention studies using TTM aim to encourage sustainable behaviour. By reducing single occupied motor vehicle and replacing them with so called sustainable transport (public transport, car pooling, biking or walking), greenhouse gas emissions can be reduced considerably. A reduction in the number of cars on our roads solves other problems such as congestion, traffic noise and traffic accidents. By combining health and environment related purposes, the message becomes stronger. Additionally, by emphasising personal health, physical activity or even direct economic impact, people see a direct result from their changed behaviour, while saving the environment is a more general and effects are not directly noticeable.

Different outcome measures were used to assess the effectiveness of the intervention. Health-centred intervention studies measured BMI, weight, waist circumference as well as general health. However, only one of three found a significant change in general health, while BMI and other measures had no effect. Measures that are associated with both health and sustainability were more common. Effects were reported as number of car trips, distance travelled, main mode share etc. Results varied due to greatly differing approaches. In general, car use could be reduced between 6% and 55%, while use of the alternative mode (walking, biking and/or public transport) increased between 11% and 150%. These results indicate a shift to action or maintenance stage, some researchers investigated attitude shifts such as the willingness to change. Attitudes towards using alternative modes improved with approximately 20% to 70%. Many of the intervention studies did not clearly differentiate between the five stages, but categorised participants in pre-action and action stage. This approach makes it difficult to assess the effects per stage. Also, interventions included different processes of change; in many cases these processes are not matched to the recommended stage. It highlights the need to develop a standardised approach for travel intervention design.

== Criticisms ==
In 2009, an article in the British Journal of Health Psychology called the TTM "arguably the dominant model of health behaviour change, having received unprecedented research attention, yet it has simultaneously attracted exceptional criticism", and said "that there is still value in the transtheoretical model but that the way in which it is researched needs urgently to be addressed". Depending on the field of application (e.g. smoking cessation, substance abuse, condom use, diabetes treatment, obesity and travel) somewhat different criticisms have been raised.

In a systematic review, published in 2003, of 23 randomized controlled trials, the authors found that "stage based interventions are no more effective than non-stage based interventions or no intervention in changing smoking behaviour". However, it was also mentioned that stage based interventions are often used and implemented inadequately in practice. Thus, criticism is directed towards the use rather the effectiveness of the model itself. Looking at interventions targeting smoking cessation in pregnancy found that stage-matched interventions were more effective than non-matched interventions. One reason for this was the greater intensity of stage-matched interventions. Also, the use of stage-based interventions for smoking cessation in mental illness proved to be effective. Further studies, e.g. a randomized controlled trial published in 2009, found no evidence that a TTM based smoking cessation intervention was more effective than a control intervention not tailored to stage of change. The study claims that those not wanting to change (i.e. precontemplators) tend to be responsive to neither stage nor non-stage based interventions. Since stage-based interventions tend to be more intensive they appear to be most effective at targeting contemplators and above rather than pre-contemplators. A 2010 systematic review of smoking cessation studies under the auspices of the Cochrane Collaboration found that "stage-based self-help interventions (expert systems and/or tailored materials) and individual counselling were neither more nor less effective than their non-stage-based equivalents". A 2014 Cochrane systematic review concluded that research on the use of TTM stages of change "in weight loss interventions is limited by risk of bias and imprecision, not allowing firm conclusions to be drawn".

Further criticism was raised regarding the "arbitrary dividing lines" that are drawn between the stages. West claimed that a more coherent and distinguishable definition for the stages is needed. Especially the fact that the stages are bound to a specific time interval is perceived to be misleading. Additionally, the effectiveness of stage-based interventions differs depending on the behavior. A continuous version of the model has been proposed, where each process is first increasingly used, and then decreases in importance, as smokers make progress along some latent dimension. This proposal suggests the use of processes without reference to stages of change.

West claimed that the model "assumes that individuals typically make coherent and stable plans", when in fact they often do not. However, the model does not require that all people make a plan: for example, the SAMSHA document Enhancing Motivation for Change in Substance Use Disorder Treatment, which uses the TTM, also says: "Don't assume that all clients need a structured method to develop a change plan. Many people can make significant lifestyle changes and initiate recovery from SUDs without formal assistance".

Within research on prevention of pregnancy and sexually transmitted diseases, a systematic review from 2003 comes to the conclusion that "no strong conclusions" can be drawn about the effectiveness of interventions based on the transtheoretical model. Again this conclusion is reached due to the inconsistency of use and implementation of the model. This study also confirms that the better stage-matched the intervention the more effect it has to encourage condom use.

Within the health research domain, a 2005 systematic review of 37 randomized controlled trials claims that "there was limited evidence for the effectiveness of stage-based interventions as a basis for behavior change. Studies with which focused on increasing physical activity levels through active commute however showed that stage-matched interventions tended to have slightly more effect than non-stage matched interventions. Since many studies do not use all constructs of the TTM, additional research suggested that the effectiveness of interventions increases the better it is tailored on all core constructs of the TTM in addition to stage of change. In diabetes research the "existing data are insufficient for drawing conclusions on the benefits of the transtheoretical model" as related to dietary interventions. Again, studies with slightly different design, e.g. using different processes, proved to be effective in predicting the stage transition of intention to exercise in relation to treating patients with diabetes.

TTM has generally found a greater popularity regarding research on physical activity, due to the increasing problems associated with unhealthy diets and sedentary living, e.g. obesity, cardiovascular problems. However, there has yet to be a consensus on the efficacy of TTM for this purpose. For example, a 2014 Cochrane Systematic Review found only three studies met their inclusion criteria, and the studies included were of such "variable methodological quality" that conclusions could not be drawn without further research. More studies have been published on this subject since the 2014 review, including some which suggest TTM could be helpful, but as of October 2025, Cochrane has not yet produced an updated meta-analysis to consider new findings.

Similar criticism regarding the standardisation as well as consistency in the use of TTM is also raised in a 2017 review on travel interventions. With regard to travel interventions only stages of change and sometimes decisional balance constructs are included. The processes used to build the intervention are rarely stage-matched and short cuts are taken by classifying participants in a pre-action stage, which summarises the precontemplation, contemplation and preparation stage, and an action/maintenance stage. More generally, TTM has been criticised within various domains due to the limitations in the research designs. For example, many studies supporting the model have been cross-sectional, but longitudinal study data would allow for stronger causal inferences. Another point of criticism is raised in a 2002 review, where the model's stages were characterized as "not mutually exclusive". Furthermore, there was "scant evidence of sequential movement through discrete stages". While research suggests that movement through the stages of change is not always linear, a study of smoking cessation conducted in 1996 demonstrated that the probability of forward stage movement is greater than the probability of backward stage movement. Due to the variations in use, implementation and type of research designs, data confirming TTM are ambiguous. More care has to be taken in using a sufficient amount of constructs, trustworthy measures, and longitudinal data.

== See also ==
- Change management
- Decision cycle

== Notes ==
The following notes summarize major differences between the well-known 1983, 1992, and 1997 versions of the model. Other published versions may contain other differences. For example, Prochaska, Prochaska, and Levesque (2001) do not mention the Termination stage, Self-efficacy, or Temptation.
