= Zeigarnik effect =

Activity that has been interrupted may be more readily recalled

In psychology, the Zeigarnik effect (named after Lithuanian-Soviet psychologist Bluma Zeigarnik) postulates that people remember unfinished or interrupted tasks better than completed tasks. In Gestalt psychology, the Zeigarnik effect has been used to demonstrate the general presence of Gestalt phenomena: not just appearing as perceptual effects, but also present in cognition.

The Zeigarnik effect is different from the Ovsiankina effect, an urge to complete tasks previously initiated. Maria Ovsiankina, a colleague of Zeigarnik, investigated the effect of task interruption on the tendency to resume the task at the next opportunity.

== Overview ==
Lithuanian-Soviet psychologist Bluma Zeigarnik first studied the phenomenon after professor and Gestalt psychologist Kurt Lewin noticed that a waiter had better recollections of still unpaid orders. However, after the completion of the task — after everyone had paid — the waiter was unable to remember any more details of the orders. Zeigarnik then designed a series of experiments to uncover the processes underlying the phenomenon. The research report was published in 1927, in the journal Psychologische Forschung.

The advantage of remembrance can be explained by looking at Lewin's field theory: a task that has already been started establishes a task-specific tension, which improves cognitive accessibility of the relevant contents. The tension is relieved upon completion of the task, but persists if it is interrupted. Through continuous tension, the content is made more easily accessible, and can be easily remembered.

The Zeigarnik effect suggests that students who suspend their study to perform unrelated activities (such as studying a different subject or playing a game), will remember material better than students who complete study sessions without a break (McKinney 1935; Zeigarnik 1927).

== Harden rule ==
Sportswriter Matt Moore has suggested that the Zeigarnik effect could explain the widespread criticism of the National Basketball Association in allowing free throws for a player "chucking it up whenever a guy comes near them". There is a stoppage of play with each foul. When repeatedly done, it is felt to build up a cognitive bias against this move. The criticism necessitated a rule change penalizing this activity, known as the Harden Rule, named after its most prominent user, James Harden.

== Replication ==
The reliability of the effect has been a matter of some controversy. Several studies, performed later in other countries, which attempted to replicate Zeigarnik's experiment failed to find any significant differences in recall between "finished" and "unfinished" (interrupted) tasks, for example Van Bergen (1968). In a 2025 systematic review and meta-analysis of the accumulated research on the Zeigarnik and Ovsiankina effects, the authors found no memory advantage for unfinished tasks but found a general tendency to resume tasks. They concluded that the Ovsiankina effect represents a general tendency, whereas the Zeigarnik effect lacks universal validity.

== Usages ==
=== Software ===
The Zeigarnik effect is used in some SaaS (Software as a service) systems to onboard users faster and effectively.

Usually, it is implemented as user interactions gamification. Examples include:

- Progress trackers which inform users of how close they are to complete a task. For example, when users see a message like "Your profile is 64% complete", they are more likely to spend a few minutes on providing all missing details.
- Checklists to provide a clear step-by-step on-boarding flow.

=== Fiction ===
Commonly used in Duanju format fiction, the cliffhanger relies on the Zeigarnik effect, the tendency to remember interrupted actions more vividly, to maintain attention and heighten suspense.

== See also ==
- List of cognitive biases
- Cliffhanger – Plot device used in fiction
- Closure (psychology) – Psychological term for one's need for an answer to something
- Procrastination – Avoiding doing a task that needs to be completed
