= Maria Ovsiankina =

Russian-German-American psychologist

- Born: 3 May 1898; Chita, Russian Empire
- Died: 28 September 1993 (aged 95); Berkeley, California
- Occupation: Psychologist
- Known for: Ovsiankina effect

Maria Arsenjevna Rickers-Ovsiankina (1898–1993) was a Russian-German-American psychologist. She studied what is now known as the Ovsiankina effect, a variation of the Zeigarnik effect. Ovsiankina worked in a variety of psychology jobs, including working with schizophrenia patients. She wrote books about psychological testing.

== Personal life ==
Ovsiankina was born in Chita, Russian Empire, in 1898. Her family gave her the nickname Marika. Ovsiankina's father founded the first Russian-Asian bank and was the owner of a coal mine. After the Russian Revolution, she immigrated to Berlin because of political upheaval and it was common for wealthy parents to send their children elsewhere for school. Ovsiankina studied fictional characters in relation to their personalities and she wanted to study the subject more at a university. Due to there being no such program available to her, she studied personality at the Psychological Institute at the University of Berlin. While attending the university, Ovsiankina was taught by Kurt Lewin. Her classmates included now well-known psychologists Tamara Dembo, Gita Birenbaum, and Bluma Zeigarnik. She received a PhD at the University of Giessen in 1928, with her thesis focused on how people act when they are interrupted from completing a certain task, which was later termed the Ovsiankina effect.

== Career ==
After Ovsiankina completed graduate school, she held psychology jobs in Germany for several years. She worked as a researcher, a teaching assistant, a counselor and in a prison. All of those jobs left her feeling unfulfilled and she moved to the United States in 1938, where she met Dembo again and also met European psychologist Eugenia Hanfmann, who was also a student of Lewin. The three of them worked together at the Worcester State Hospital in Massachusetts, which is where Ovsiankina started working with patients who had schizophrenia and she considered many of them to be her close friends. In 1935, she began working at Wheaton College as a psychology professor for 14 years. In 1949, she developed and directed the clinical training program at the University of Connecticut. Ovsiankina was interested in psychological testing, including the Rorschach test, and she wrote books on those tests. She also taught at Mount Holyoke College, the University of Oregon, Cornell University, Harvard University, and Northeastern Universities.

=== Ovsiankina effect ===
In 1928, Ovsiankina studied a variation of the Zeigarnik effect, known as the Ovsiankina effect. The Zeigarnik effect states that people remember unfinished or interrupted tasks more than completed tasks. During the test, Ovsiankina gave subjects tasks to complete and left them alone in a room to study them while the participants started working on the task again. Her approach to the prior effect study showed "that it was not the interruption of the action per se that is responsible for the Zeigarnik effect. The determining factor is the psychological situation as it is perceived by the individual; i.e., whether the goal (e.g., solving a task correctly) is perceived as having been accomplished or not". The Ovsiankina effect also "showed that interrupted tasks are almost always resumed".

== Later life and death ==
Ovsiankina retired in 1965 and moved to California, where she taught courses at the University of California, Berkeley. She died in 1993 and was buried in Germany.
