= Force-field analysis =

Framework in the field of social science

In social science, force-field analysis provides a framework for looking at the factors ("forces") that influence a situation, originally social situations. It looks at forces that are either driving the movement toward a goal (helping forces) or blocking movement toward a goal (hindering forces). The principle, developed by Kurt Lewin, is a significant contribution to the fields of social science, psychology, social psychology, community psychology, communication, organizational development, process management, and change management.

== History ==
Lewin, a social psychologist, believed the "field" to be a Gestalt psychological environment existing in an individual's (or in the collective group) mind at a certain point in time that can be mathematically described in a topological constellation of constructs. The "field" is very dynamic, changing with time and experience. When fully constructed, an individual's "field" (Lewin used the term "life space") describes that person's motives, values, needs, moods, goals, anxieties, and ideals.

Lewin believed that changes of an individual's "life space" depend upon that individual's internalization of external stimuli (from the physical and social world) into the "life space". Although Lewin did not use the word "experiential" (see experiential learning), he nonetheless believed that interaction (experience) of the "life space" with "external stimuli" (at what he calls the "boundary zone") was important for development (or regression). For Lewin, the development (or regression) of an individual occurs when their "life space" has a "boundary zone" experience with external stimuli. Note it is not merely the experience that causes a change in the "life space", but the acceptance (internalization) of external stimuli.

Lewin took these same principles and applied them to the analysis of group conflict, learning, adolescence, hatred, morale, German society, etc. This approach allowed him to break down common misconceptions of these social phenomena and to determine their basic elemental constructs. He used theory, mathematics, and common sense to define a force field and hence to determine the causes of human and group behaviour.

== See also ==
- Decisional balance sheet
- Field theory (psychology)
- Formula for change
- Immunity to change
