= Richard Beckhard =

American sociologist (1918–1999)

- Born: 1918
- Died: 1999 (aged 80–81)
- Occupation: Researcher

Richard Beckhard (1918–1999) was an American organizational theorist, adjunct professor at MIT, and researcher in the field of organization development.

Beckhard co-launched the Addison-Wesley Organization Development Series and began the Organization Development Network in 1967. His work, Organization Development: Strategies and Models, was published in 1969. Beckhard was an adjunct professor at the MIT Sloan School of Management from 1963 to 1984. He died on December 28, 1999.

He helped to define organization development as: "an effort (1) planned, (2) organization-wide, (3) managed from the top, to (4) increase organization effectiveness and health through (5) planned interventions in the organization's 'processes', using behavioural-science knowledge". He was the first to coin the practical precept for decision-makers: "let it happen; [if not] help it happen; [if not] make it happen!" Through the Organization Development Network and The Gestalt Institute of Cleveland in the United States and The Professional Development Institute PDI Inc. in Canada, Richard Beckhard shared this precept, for over thirty years, with managers and executives in business and governments.

Beckhard published and popularized David Gleicher's Formula for Change. The formula proposes that the combination of organisational dissatisfaction, vision for the future and the possibility of immediate, tactical action must be stronger than the resistance within the organisation in order for meaningful change to occur.

Beckhard is also credited for developing the GRPI model of team effectiveness, which highlights four key conditions (Goals, Roles, Processes, Interpersonal) for teams to succeed.

Another area of Beckhard's work was concerned with change and continuity within family-owned businesses.

== Selected publications ==
Books, a selection

- Beckhard, Richard. "Organization development: Strategies and models." (1969).
- Beckhard, Richard, and Reuben T. Harris. Organizational transitions: Managing complex change. Reading, MA: Addison-Wesley, 1977.
- Beckhard, Richard, and Wendy Pritchard. Changing the essence: The art of creating and leading fundamental change in organizations. Vol. 10. San Francisco: Jossey-Bass, 1992.
- Hesselbein, Frances, Marshall Goldsmith, and Richard Beckhard. The leader of the future. Jossey Bass, 1996.
- Louis L. Carter, Marshall Goldsmith, Jay Conger, and Richard Beckhard. Best Practices in Organization & Human Resources Development Handbook, Linkage Press, 2000.

Articles, a selection

- Beckhard, Richard, and Gibb Dyer Jr. "Managing continuity in the family-owned business." Organizational Dynamics 12.1 (1983): 5–12.
