= Vygotsky Circle =

20th-century network of Soviet scholars

The Vygotsky Circle (also known as Vygotsky–Luria Circle) was an influential informal network of psychologists, educationalists, medical specialists, physiologists, and neuroscientists, associated with Lev Vygotsky (1896–1934) and Alexander Luria (1902–1977), active in 1920–1940s in the Soviet Union (Moscow, Leningrad and Kharkiv). The work of the Circle contributed to the foundation of the integrative science of mind, brain, and behavior in their cultural and bio-social development also known under somewhat vague and imprecise name of cultural-historical psychology.

The Vygotsky Circle, also referred to as "Vygotsky boom" incorporated the ideas of social and interpersonal relations, the practices of empirical scientific research, and "Stalinist science" based on the discursive practices of the Soviet science in the 1930s. The group dispersed after the German invasion of the Soviet Union at the beginning of World War II, but the influence of its former members was quite notable in Soviet science of the postwar period, especially after Soviet psychology finally came to power in early 1960s. A problem with the theories of the Vygotsky Circle and connecting it to the present generation is the biases and misconceptions with the history of Soviet Psychology.

The Circle included altogether around three dozen individuals at different periods, including Leonid Sakharov, Boris Varshava, Nikolai Bernstein, Solomon Gellerstein, Mark Lebedinsky, Leonid Zankov, Aleksei N. Leontiev, Alexander Zaporozhets, Daniil Elkonin, Lydia Bozhovich, Bluma Zeigarnik, Filipp Bassin, and many others. German-American psychologist Kurt Lewin and Russian film director and art theorist Sergei Eisenstein are also mentioned as the "peripheral members" of the Circle.

== History ==
The Vygotsky Circle was formed around 1924 in Moscow after Vygotsky moved there from the provincial town of Gomel in Belarus. There, at the Institute of Psychology, he met graduate students Zankov, Solov'ev, Sakharov, and Varshava, as well as future collaborator Aleksander Luria. The group grew incrementally and operated in Moscow, Kharkiv, and Leningrad, all in the Soviet Union. From the beginning of World War II on 1 Sept 1939 to the start of the Great Patriotic War on 22 June 1941, several centers of post-Vygotskian research were formed by Luria, Leontiev, Zankov, and Elkonin. The Circle ended, however, when the Soviet Union was invaded by Germany to start the Great Patriotic War.

However, by the end of 1930s a new center was formed around 1939 under the leadership of Luria and Leontiev. In the post-war period this developed into the so-called "School of Vygotsky-Leontiev-Luria". Recent studies show that this "school" never existed as such.

There are two problems that are related to the Vygotsky circle. First was the historical recording of the Soviet psychology with innumerable gaps in time and prejudice. Second was the almost exclusive focus on the person, Lev Vygotsky, himself to the extent that the scientific contributions of other notable characters have been considerably downplayed or forgotten.

== Collaborators ==
The following is a list of people associated with the Vygotsky Circle: (Note that the list does not include some of Luria's collaborators of 1920–1930s and those members of the Kharkov group of researchers who did not work directly with Vygotsky.)

- Vladimir Alekseevich Artemov
- Roza Abramovna Averbukh
- Filipp Veniaminovich Bassin
- Nikolai Aleksandrovich Bernstein
- Esfir’ Solomonovna Bein (Bejn)
- Gita Vasil’evna Birenbaum
- Rakhil’ Markovna Boskis
- Lidiya Il’inichna Bozhovich
- Izrail’ Isaakovich Danyushevskii
- Nikolai Fedorovich Dobrynin
- Marina Borisovna Eidinova
- Sergei Mikhailovich Eisenstein
- Daniil Borisovich El’konin
- Frida Iosifovna Fradkina
- Solomon Grigor’evich Gellerstein
- Liya Solomonovna Geshelina
- Nina Nikolaevna Kaulina
- Vladimir Mikhailovich Kogan
- Tat’yana Efimovna Konnikova
- Yuliya Vladimirovna Kotelova
- Mark Samuilovich Lebedinskii (Lebedinsky)
- Mira Abramovna Levina
- Roza Evgen’evna Levina
- Aleksei N. Leontiev
- Kurt Lewin
- Aleksandr Romanovich Luria
- Nataliya Aleksandrovna Menchinskaya
- Nataliya Grigor’evna Morozova
- E.I. Pashkovskaya
- Mariya Semenovna Pevzner
- Leonid Solomonovich Sakharov
- Nikolai Vasil’evich Samukhin
- A.A. Shein
- Vera Schmidt
- Zhozefina Il’inichna Shif
- Liya Solomonovna Slavina
- Ivan Mikhailovich Solov’ev (alias Solov’ev-El’pidinskii)
- Boris Efimovich Varshava
- Ksenia Ivanovna Veresotskaya
- Leonid Vladimirovich Zankov
- Alexander Zaporozhets
- Bluma Zeigarnik
- Evald Ilyenkov

== See also ==
Similar "Circles"

- Prague Linguistic Circle
- Moscow Linguistic Circle
- Linguistic Circle of Copenhagen
- Linguistic Circle of New York
- Bakhtin Circle
- Jean Piaget Circle

Related topics

- Constructivism
- Kharkov School of Psychology
- Group dynamics
- Berlin School of experimental psychology
- Thesis circle

== Sources ==
Primary

- Yasnitsky, A. (Ed.) (2019). Questioning Vygotsky’s Legacy: Scientific Psychology or Heroic Cult. London and New York: Routledge [ book preview ]
- Yasnitsky, A. (2018). Vygotsky: An Intellectual Biography. London, Routledge. ISBN 978-1-13-8806740 [ book preview ]
- Yasnitsky, A., van der Veer, R., Aguilar, E. & García, L.N. (Eds.) (2016). Vygotski revisitado: una historia crítica de su contexto y legado. Buenos Aires: Miño y Dávila Editores
- Yasnitsky, A. & van der Veer, R. (Eds.) (2016). Revisionist Revolution in Vygotsky Studies. Routledge, ISBN 978-1-13-888730-5
- Yasnitsky, A. (2011). Vygotsky Circle as a Personal Network of Scholars: Restoring Connections Between People and Ideas. Integrative Psychological and Behavioral Science, doi:10.1007/s12124-011-9168-5.
- Yasnitsky, A. (2009). Vygotsky Circle during the Decade of 1931-1941: Toward an Integrative Science of Mind, Brain, and Education pdf (Ph.D. dissertation, University of Toronto)
- Stetsenko, A.; Arievitch, I. (2004). "Vygotskian collaborative project of social transformation: History, politics, and practice in knowledge construction" (PDF). International Journal of Critical Psychology. 12 (4): 58–80.

Secondary

- Valsiner, J. (1988). Developmental Psychology in the Soviet Union. Brighton: Harvester Press.
- Blanck, G. (1990). Vygotsky: The man and his cause. In Moll, L. (Ed.) Vygotsky and Education. Cambridge: Cambridge University Press.
- Van der Veer, R., & Valsiner, J. (1991). Understanding Vygotsky. A quest for synthesis. Oxford: Basil Blackwell.
- Van der Veer, R., & Valsiner, J. (Eds.) (1994). The Vygotsky Reader. Oxford: Blackwell.
- van der Veer, R. & Yasnitsky, A. (2011). Vygotsky in English: What Still Needs to Be Done. Integrative Psychological and Behavioral Science html, pdf
