= Ovsiankina effect =

Tendency to resume an interrupted unfinished task again

In psychology, the Ovsiankina effect describes the innate human urge to finish tasks previously initiated. This tendency to resume an interrupted action is especially prevalent when the action hasn't yet been achieved. The effect is named after Maria Ovsiankina, who conducted research on this behavior.

== Overview ==
The principle underlying the Ovsiankina effect posits that an interrupted task, even without any explicit reward or incentive, creates a "quasi-need". This drives intrusive thoughts, compelling an individual to resume and possibly complete the task. This may result in cognitive dissonance if the task remains unfinished.

Kurt Lewin's field theory provides an explanation for this behavior, suggesting that an interrupted action constitutes a condition for a strained system. This tension and strain make the task more memorable, a phenomenon better known as the Zeigarnik effect.

While the Zeigarnik effect highlighted the tension and memorability of unfinished tasks, Ovsiankina's research delved deeper into the subsequent behaviors this tension fostered. Specifically, her studies demonstrated that when individuals were interrupted during a task and later given free time, they displayed a strong inclination to return to and complete the task.

=== Modern implications ===
The principles behind the Ovsiankina effect have broad applications across various sectors:

1. UX Design: The urge to complete tasks can be harnessed by designers to nudge users into completing tasks or actions on digital platforms.
2. Education: Teachers can use this effect to structure lessons, introducing challenges early on and resolving them later to maintain student engagement.
3. Advertising and marketing: Advertisements may utilize cliffhangers or unsolved mysteries to make their products or messages more memorable.
4. Entertainment: TV shows, book series, and video games frequently employ cliffhangers to keep audiences returning.
5. Productivity: Understanding the desire to finish tasks can aid in personal and professional productivity.
6. Mental well-being: Recognizing the stress that incomplete tasks can introduce is essential for mental health.

== See also ==
- Rumination (psychology)
- Closure (psychology)
- Human multitasking
