= Decision cycle =

Sequence of steps for decision-making

A decision cycle or decision loop is a sequence of steps used by an entity on a repeated basis to reach and implement decisions and to learn from the results. The "decision cycle" phrase has a history of use to broadly categorize various methods of making decisions, going upstream to the need, downstream to the outcomes, and cycling around to connect the outcomes to the needs.

A decision cycle is said to occur when an explicitly specified decision model is used to guide a decision and then the outcomes of that decision are assessed against the need for the decision. This cycle includes specification of desired results (the decision need), tracking of outcomes, and assessment of outcomes against the desired results.

== Examples of decision cycles ==
- In quality control, PDCA (Plan–Do–Check–Act) is used.
- In science, the scientific method (Observation–Hypothesis–Experiment–Evaluation) can also be seen as a decision cycle.
- In the United States Armed Forces, a theory of an OODA loop (Observe–Orient–Decide–Act) has been advocated by Colonel John Boyd.
- In the lean startup methodology, the Build-Measure-Learn loop is used to guide product development.
- In management, Herbert A. Simon proposed a decision cycle of three steps (Intelligence–Design–Choice). Much later, other scholars expanded his framework to five steps (Intelligence–Design–Choice–Implementation–Learning).
- In design thinking, the design process is often conceived as a decision cycle (or design cycle), such as Robert McKim's ETC (Express–Test–Cycle).
- In the Getting Things Done time management method, workflow consists of a cycle of five stages (Collect–Process–Organize–Do–Review).
- In the nursing process, the ADPIE (Assessment–Diagnosis–Planning–Implementation–Evaluation) process is used. Alternatively, the ASPIRE (Assessment–Systematic Nursing Diagnosis–Planning–Implementation–Recheck–Evaluation) model includes an additional stage—Recheck—in between Implementation and Evaluation.
- In psychotherapy, the transtheoretical model posits five stages of intentional change (Precontemplation–Contemplation–Preparation–Action–Maintenance). These stages were initially conceived as linear, but John C. Norcross said that for many people the stages are more appropriately viewed as a cycle (Psych–Prep–Perspire–Persist–Relapse).
- In USAID, the use of a program cycle, "codified in the Automated Directive Systems (ADS) 201, is USAID's operational model for planning, delivering, assessing, and adapting development programming in a given region or country to achieve more effective and sustainable results in order to advance U.S. foreign policy". Relatedly, within the agency there exists resources regarding adaptive management decision cycles.

== See also ==
- Adaptive management
- Decision tree
- Decisional balance sheet
- Feedback
- Learning cycle
- Systems development lifecycle
- Virtuous circle and vicious circle
- Intelligence cycle
