= Formula for change =

Model of organisational change

The formula for change (or "the change formula") provides a model to assess the relative strengths affecting the likely success of organisational change programs. The formula was created by David Gleicher while he was working at management consultants Arthur D. Little in the early 1960s, refined by Kathie Dannemiller in the 1980s, and further developed by Steve Cady.

== Gleicher (original) version: C = A × B × D > X ==
The original formula, as created by Gleicher and published by Richard Beckhard (see § Attribution confusion below), is:

C = A × B × D > X

where:

C
is change;
A
is dissatisfaction with the status quo;
B
is a desired clear state;
D
is practical steps to the desired state;
X
is the cost of the change.

== Dannemiller version: C = D × V × F > R ==
Dannemiller reframed the formula with a focus on overcoming resistance to change:

C = D × V × F > R

This formula poses that three factors must be present for meaningful organizational change to take place. These factors are:

D
Dissatisfaction with how things are now;
V
Vision of what is possible;
F
First concrete steps that can be taken towards the vision. If the product of these three factors is greater than
R
Resistance,

then change is possible. Because D, V, and F are multiplied, if any one is absent (zero) or low, then the product will be zero or low and therefore not capable of overcoming the resistance.

To ensure a successful change it is necessary to use influence and strategic thinking in order to create vision and identify those crucial, early steps towards it. In addition, the organization must recognize and accept the dissatisfaction that exists by listening to the employee voice while sharing industry trends, leadership ideas, best practices and competitor analysis to identify the necessity for change.

== Cady version: D × V × F × S > R ==
D × V × F × S > R

This version adds a fourth factor: S for Supports for follow-through that also must be present for sustainable change to happen. Again the factors necessary to overcome resistance to change are:

D
Dissatisfaction with how things are now; sometimes framed as the Desire for change that requires a shared Database of information;
V
an ennobling Vision of where people are headed together;
F
First concrete steps that can be taken towards the vision;
S
Clear supports for follow through.

When multiplied, these four factors combine to overcome

R
Resistance to change.

== Attribution confusion ==
It is often inaccurately attributed to Richard Beckhard because he published the formula in both versions of his widely read book Organizational Transitions. In the original 1977 version, Beckhard and Harris gave full credit to Gleicher. In the second edition from 1987, they did not even mention Gleicher's name once in the entire book, but did present the equation as a formula for overcoming resistance.

Elaine Dickson attributed the formula to Beckhard in 1971, via a National Training Laboratories Institute for Applied Behavioral Science professional OD training program (in Bethel, Massachusetts), in her 1982 book Say No, Say Yes to Change: Finding Growth Opportunities in Life's Changes (Broadman Press, p. 142).

== Popularization ==
It was Kathleen Dannemiller who dusted off the formula and simplified it, making it more accessible for consultants and managers. Dannemiller and Robert W. Jacobs first published the more common version of the formula in 1992. Paula Griffin stated that Gleicher started it, Beckhard and Harris promoted it, but it really took off when Dannemiller changed the language to make it easier to remember and use.

== Empirical research ==
Researchers have attempted to test the formula's effectiveness empirically. Čudanov et al. developed a quantitative measurement instrument, based on Beckhard and Harris's version of the formula, that can be utilized in change management practice. The instrument aims to support change readiness in all phases of the change management cycle, on the one hand, and to provide insights into change success factors, on the other. Post-implementation assessment can reveal key factors that cause change failure. The measurement instrument of Čudanov et al. is shown in the wikibook Handbook of Management Scales.

== See also ==
- Decisional balance sheet
- Force-field analysis
- Immunity to change
