= Decisional balance sheet =

Tool for representing pros and cons

A decisional balance sheet or decision balance sheet is a tabular method for representing the pros and cons of different choices and for helping someone decide what to do in a certain circumstance. It is often used in working with ambivalence in people who are engaged in behaviours that are harmful to their health (for example, problematic substance use or excessive eating), as part of psychological approaches such as those based on the transtheoretical model of change, and in certain circumstances in motivational interviewing.

== Use and history ==
The decisional balance sheet records the advantages and disadvantages of different options. It can be used both for individual and organisational decisions. The balance sheet recognises that both gains and losses can be consequences of a single decision. It might, for example, be introduced in a session with someone who is experiencing problems with their alcohol consumption with a question such as: "Could you tell me what you get out of your drinking and what you perhaps find less good about it?" Therapists are generally advised to use this sort of phrasing rather than a blunter injunction to think about the negative aspects of problematic behaviour, as the latter could increase psychological resistance.

An early use of a decisional balance sheet was by Benjamin Franklin. In a 1772 letter to Joseph Priestley, Franklin described his own use of the method, which is now often called the Ben Franklin method. It involves making a list of pros and cons, estimating the importance of each one, eliminating items from the pros and cons lists of roughly equal importance (or groups of items that can cancel each other out) until one column (pro or con) is dominant. Experts on decision support systems for practical reasoning have warned that the Ben Franklin method is only appropriate for very informal decision making: "A weakness in applying this rough-and-ready approach is a poverty of imagination and lack of background knowledge required to generate a full enough range and detail of competing considerations." Social psychologist Timothy D. Wilson has warned that the Ben Franklin method can be used in ways that fool people into falsely believing rationalisations that do not accurately reflect their true motivations or predict their future behaviour.

In papers from 1959 onwards, Irving Janis and Leon Mann coined the phrase decisional balance sheet and used the concept as a way of looking at decision-making. James O. Prochaska and colleagues then incorporated Janis and Mann's concept into the transtheoretical model of change, an integrative theory of therapy that is widely used for facilitating behaviour change. Research studies on the transtheoretical model suggest that, in general, for people to succeed at behaviour change, the pros of change should outweigh the cons before they move from the contemplation stage to the action stage of change. Thus, the balance sheet is both an informal measure of readiness for change and a decision making aid.

One research paper reported that combining the decisional balance sheet technique with the implementation intentions technique was "more effective in increasing exercise behaviour than a control or either strategy alone." Another research paper said that a decisional balance intervention may strengthen a person's commitment to change when that person has already committed to change, but could decrease commitment to change if that person is ambivalent; the authors suggested that evocation of change talk (a technique from motivational interviewing) is more appropriate than a decisional balance sheet when a clinician intends to help ambivalent clients resolve their ambivalence in the direction of change. William R. Miller and Stephen Rollnick's textbook on motivational interviewing discusses decisional balance in a chapter titled "Counseling with Neutrality", and describes "decisional balance as a way of proceeding when you wish to counsel with neutrality rather than move toward a particular change goal".

== Variations ==
There are several variations of the decisional balance sheet. In Janis and Mann's original description eight or more cells are depending on how many choices there are. For each new choice there are pairs of cells (one for advantages, one for disadvantages) for these four different aspects:

1. anticipated utilitarian effects for self
2. anticipated utilitarian effects for significant others
3. anticipated effect on how one is regarded by significant others
4. anticipated effects on how one views oneself

John C. Norcross is among the psychologists who have simplified the balance sheet to four cells: the pros and cons of changing, for self and for others. Similarly, several psychologists have simplified the balance sheet to a four-cell format consisting of the pros and cons of the current behaviour and of a changed behaviour. Some authors separate short- and long-term benefits and risks of a behaviour. The example below allows for three options: carrying on as before, reducing a harmful behaviour to a level where it might be less harmful, or stopping it altogether; it therefore has six cells consisting of a pro and con pair for each of the three options.

Example of decisional balance sheet for someone experiencing alcohol problems
	Plusses	Minuses
Continue drinking as I am	It's what my friends do It makes me less anxious It's fun being drunk I like the taste	I get into fights Health problems Divorce threat Debts; I can't remember things the next day
Cut down	I can still meet my friends It will help my health	Will my partner believe me? Can I stick to it?
Stop drinking	I won't get into fights any more It will please my partner It will save money Good for my health	I might have to avoid my friends How will I cope with anxiety? What will I do for fun?

Any evaluation is subject to change, and often the cells are interconnected. For example, looking at the table above, if something were to happen in the individual's marital life (an argument or the partner leaves or becomes pregnant or has an accident), the event can either increase or decrease how much weight the person gives to the elements in the balance sheet that refer to the relationship.

Another refinement of the balance sheet is to use a scoring system to give numerical weights to different elements of the balance sheet; in such cases, the balance sheet becomes what is often called a decision matrix.

Similarly, Fabio Losa and Valerie Belton combined drama theory and multiple-criteria decision analysis, two decision-making techniques from the field of operations research, and applied them to an example of interpersonal conflict over substance abuse, which they described as follows:

A couple, Jo and Chris, have lived together for several years. However, Chris cannot stand it any longer that Jo is always drunk and threatens to leave. The scene setting establishes the initial frame, the situation seen by a particular actor (Chris) at a specific point. The actors are Jo and Chris and each has a single yes/no policy option—for Chris this is to stay or leave and for Jo it is to stop drinking or not. These options define four possible scenarios or futures...

Dialectical behavior therapy includes a form of decisional balance sheet called a pros and cons grid.

Kickstarter co-founder Yancey Strickler created a four-cell matrix similar in appearance to a decisional balance sheet that he compared to a bento box, with cells for self and others, present and future.

== ABC model ==
Psychology professor Finn Tschudi's ABC model of psychotherapy uses a structure similar to a decisional balance sheet: A is a row that defines the problem; B is a row that lists schemas (tacit assumptions) about the advantages and disadvantages of resolving the problem; and C is a row that lists schemas about the advantages and disadvantages of maintaining the problem. Tschudi was partly inspired by Harold Greenwald's book Decision Therapy, which posited that much of psychotherapy involves helping people make decisions. In the ABC model, people are said to be blocked or stuck in resolving a problem when their C schemas define strong advantages to maintaining the problem and/or strong disadvantages to resolving the problem, and often their C schemas are at a low level of awareness. In such cases, resolving the problem usually requires raising awareness and restructuring the C schemas, although several other general strategies for resolving the problem are available as alternatives or adjuncts.

In an approach to psychotherapy called coherence therapy, A is called the symptom, B is called the anti-symptom position and C is called the pro-symptom position, although coherence therapy also differentiates between "functional" symptoms that are directly caused by C and "functionless" symptoms that are not directly caused by C. In terms of behaviour modification, the problematic half of A describes one or more costly operants, and C describes the reinforcement that the operant provides.

The following table summarizes the structure of the ABC model.

The ABC model
A = problem	a_{1} = problem position (PP)	a_{2} = desired position (DP)
B = elaboration of A	b_{1} = disadvantages of PP	b_{2} = advantages of DP
C = defines dilemma	c_{2} = advantages of PP	c_{1} = disadvantages of DP

== Four-square tool ==
In an approach to psychotherapy called focused acceptance and commitment therapy (FACT), the four-square tool is a tabular method similar in appearance to a decisional balance sheet. The four-square tool shows four sets of behaviors: positive behaviors (called "workable" behaviors) and negative behaviors (called "unworkable" behaviors) that a person does publicly and privately. In the four-square tool, the advantages and disadvantages of the behaviors are implied, rather than listed in separate cells as in a decisional balance sheet. The following table is a blank four-square tool.

The four square tool from FACT
	Not working (do less)	More workable (do more)
Public behavior		
Private behavior		

== See also ==
- Analysis paralysis – Overthinking causes
- Cost–benefit analysis – Systematic approach to estimating the strengths and weaknesses of alternatives
- Decision cycle – Sequence of steps for decision-making
- Decision tree – Decision support tool
- Formula for change – Model of organisational change
- Immunity to change
- Issue mapping – Diagram in which pros and cons are types of nodes
- Motivational salience – Cognitive process
- Opportunity cost – Benefit lost by a choice between options
- Practical reason – Use of reason to decide how to act
- Psychological dependence – Form of behavioral dependence involving emotional symptoms
- Reflective equilibrium – State of balance among a set of beliefs, arrived at by considering general principles
- SWOT analysis – Business planning and analysis technique
- Trade-off – Situational decision
- Unintended consequences – Unforeseen outcomes of an action
