= Lewin's equation =

Heuristic formula to explain determinants of behavior

Lewin's equation, B = f(P, E), is a heuristic formula proposed by psychologist Kurt Lewin as an explanation of what determines behavior.

== Description ==
The formula states that behavior is a function of the person and their environment:

$$B=f(P,E)$$

Where $B$ is behavior, $P$ is person, and $E$ is the environment.

This equation was first presented in Lewin's book, Principles of Topological Psychology, published in 1936. The equation was proposed as an attempt to unify the different branches of psychology (e.g. child psychology, animal psychology, psychopathology) with a flexible theory applicable to all distinct branches of psychology. This equation is directly related to Lewin's field theory. Field theory is centered around the idea that a person's life space determines their behavior. Thus, the equation was also expressed as B = f(L), where L is the life space. In Lewin's book, he first presents the equation as B = f(S), where behavior is a function of the whole situation (S). He then extended this original equation by suggesting that the whole situation could be roughly split into two parts: the person (P) and the environment (E). According to Lewin, social behavior, in particular, was the most psychologically interesting and relevant behavior.

Lewin held that the variables in the equation (e.g. P and E) could be replaced with the specific, unique situational and personal characteristics of the individual. As a result, he also believed that his formula, while seemingly abstract and theoretical, had distinct concrete applications for psychology.

== Gestalt influence ==
Many scholars (and even Lewin himself) have acknowledged the influence of Gestalt psychology on Lewin's work. Lewin's field theory holds that a number of different and competing forces combine to result in the totality of the situation. A single person's behavior may be different in unique situations, as he or she is acting partly in response to these differential forces and factors (e.g. the environment, or E):

"A physically identical environment can be psychologically different even for the same man in different conditions."

Similarly, two different individuals placed in exactly the same situation will not necessarily engage in the same behavior.

"Even when from the standpoint of the physicist the environment is identical or nearly identical for a child and or an adult, the psychological situation can be fundamentally different."

For this reason, Lewin holds that the person (e.g. P) must be considered in conjunction with the environment. P consists of the entirety of a person (e.g. his or her past, present, future, personality, motivations, desires). All elements within P are contained within the life space, and all elements within P interact with each other.

Lewin emphasizes that the desires and motivations within the person and the situation in its entirety, the sum of all these competing forces, combine to form something larger: the life space. This notion speaks directly to the gestalt idea that the "whole is greater than the sum of its parts." The idea that the parts (e.g. P and E) of the whole (e.g. S) combine to form an interactive system has been called Lewin's 'dynamic approach,' a term that specifically refers to regarding "the elements of any situation...as parts of a system."

== Interaction of person and environment ==
=== Relative importance of P and E ===
Lewin explicitly stated that either the person or the environment may be more important in particular situations:

"Every psychological event depends upon the state of the person and at the same time on the environment, although their relative importance is different in different cases."

Thus, Lewin believed he succeeded in creating an applicable theory that was also "flexible enough to do justice to the enormous differences between the various events and organisms." In a sense, he held that it was inappropriate to pick a side on the classic psychological debate of nature versus nurture, as he held that "every scientific psychology must take into account whole situations, i.e., the state of both person and environment." Further, Lewin stated that:

"The question whether heredity or environment plays the greater part also belongs to this kind of thinking. The transition of the Galilean thinking involved a recognition of the general validity of the thesis: An event is always the result of the interaction of several facts."

=== Specific function linking P and E ===
Lewin defined an empirical law as "the functional relationship between various facts," where facts are the "different characteristics of an event or situation." In Lewin's original proposal of his equation, he did not specify how exactly the person and the environment interact to produce behavior. Some scholars have noted that Lewin's use of the comma in his equation between the P and E represents Lewin's flexibility and receptiveness to multiple ways that these two may interact. Lewin indeed held that the importance of the person or of the environment may vary on a case-by-case basis. The use of the comma may provide the flexibility to support this assertion.

== Psychological reality ==
Lewin differentiates between multiple realities. For example, the psychological reality encompasses everything that an individual perceives and believes to be true. Only what is contained within the psychological reality can affect behavior. In contrast, things that may be outside the psychological reality, such as bits of the physical reality or social reality, has no direct relation to behavior. Lewin states:

"The psychological reality...does not depend upon whether or not the content...exists in a physical or social sense....The existence or nonexistence...of a psychological fact are independent of the existence or nonexistence to which its content refers."

As a result, the only reality that is contained within the life space is the psychological reality, as this is the reality that has direct consequences for behavior. For example, in Principles of Topological Psychology, Lewin continually reiterates the sentiment that "the physical reality of the object concerned is not decisive for the degree of psychological reality." Lewin refers to the example of a "child living in a 'magic world.'" Lewin asserts that, for this child, the realities of the 'magic world' are a psychological reality, and thus must be considered as an influence on their subsequent behavior, even though this 'magic world' does not exist within the physical reality. Likewise, scholars familiar with Lewin's work have emphasized that the psychological situation, as defined by Lewin, is strictly composed of those facts which the individual perceives or believes.

== Principle of contemporaneity ==
In Lewin's theoretical framework, the whole situation—or the life space, which contains both the person and the environment—is dynamic. In order to accurately determine behavior, Lewin's equation holds that one must consider and examine the life space at the exact moment when the behavior occurred. The life space, even moments after such behavior has occurred, is no longer exactly the same as it was when behavior occurred and thus may not accurately represent the whole situation that led to the behavior in the first place. This focus on the present situation represented a departure from many other theories at the time. Most theories tended to focus on looking at an individual's past in order to explain their present behavior, such as Sigmund Freud's psychoanalysis. Lewin's emphasis on the present state of the life space did not preclude the idea that an individual's past may impact the present state of the life space:

"[The] influence of the previous history is to be thought of as indirect in dynamic psychology: From the point of view of systematic causation, past events cannot influence present events. Past events can only have a position in the historical causal chains whose interweavings create the present situation."

Lewin referred to this concept as the principle of contemporaneity.
