= Leonid Zankov =

Soviet psychologist (1901–1977)

Leonid Vladimirovich Zankov (Russian: Леонид Владимирович Занков; 23 April 1901 – 27 November 1977) was a Soviet psychologist and defectologist, a member of Vygotsky Circle and a major administrator of scientific research in the Soviet Union.

Zankov specialized in the psychology of memory, psychology of abnormal development (defectology), and educational research and practice. He authored one of the two most prominent educational conceptions of the so-called "developmental learning" (developmental instruction) that is known under the name of its creator as the "Zankov system of developmental learning".

== Professional career ==
The former student of Lev Vygotsky in the 1920s, Zankov graduated from the Institute of Psychology in Moscow in the late 1920s and started his academic career as a researcher at the Moscow's Experimental Institute of Defectology (founded in 1929). In 1944-1947 Zankov served as the Director of the institute. In 1942 he defended his doctoral thesis on the topic of the "psychology of remembering" (specifically, the psychology of recalling), and in 1945 he was elected Corresponding Member of the Academy of Pedagogical Sciences (APN) of Russian Soviet Federative Socialist Republic (RSFSR). In 1955 he was promoted to Full Member of the academy, and, after its administrative reorganization in 1968, became the Full Member of the Academy of Pedagogical Sciences of the USSR. In 1951-1955 Zankov was a Director of the Scientific Institute of the Theory and History of Pedagogy under the aegis of the Academy of Pedagogical Sciences.
