= Field theory (psychology) =

Psychological theory

In Gestalt psychology and social psychology, field theory is a theory that examines patterns of interaction between the individual and the total field, or environment. The concept first made its appearance in psychology with roots in the holistic perspective of Gestalt theories. It was developed by Kurt Lewin, a Gestalt psychologist, in the 1940s.

This field theory can be expressed by a Lewin's equation: $B = f(p,e)$, meaning that behavior B is a function of the person p and their cultural environment e.

== History ==
Early philosophers believed the body to have a rational, inner nature that helped guide our thoughts and bodies. This intuitive force, our soul, was viewed as having supreme control over our entire being. However, this view changed during the intellectual revolution of the 17th century. The mind versus the body was a forever evolving concept that received great attention from the likes of Descartes, Locke and Kant. From once believing that the mind and body interact, to thinking the mind is completely separate from the body, rationalist and empirical views were deeply rooted in the understanding of this phenomenon. Field Theory emerged when Lewin considered a person's behavior to consist of many different interactions. He believed people to have dynamic thoughts, forces, and emotions that shifted their behavior to reflect their present state.

== Overview of Kurt Lewin's influences ==
Kurt Lewin was born in Germany in 1890. He originally wanted to pursue behaviorism, but later found an interest in Gestalt psychology while volunteering in the German army in 1914. He went on to work at the Psychological Institute in the University of Berlin after World War 1. There he worked with two of the founders of gestalt psychology, Max Wertheimer and Wolfgang Köhler. When Lewin moved to the US, he had become more involved with real world issues and the need to understand and change human behavior. His desire and personal involvement with gestalt psychology led to the development of his field theory. Lewin's field theory emphasized interpersonal conflict, individual personalities, and situational variables. He proposed that behavior is the result of the individual and their environment. In viewing a person's social environment and its effect on their dynamic field, Lewin also found that a person's psychological state influences their social field.

Drawing from both mathematics and physics, Lewin took the concept of the field, the focus of one's experiences, personal needs, and topography to map spatial relationships. Lewin created a field theory rule that says analysis can only start with the situation represented as a whole, so in order for change to take place, the entire situation must be considered. There seems to be a repetition of people having the same unsuccessful attempts to grow and develop themselves and field theory draws the conclusion that this repetition comes from forces within our fields. To display this psychological field, Lewin constructed "topological maps" that showed inter-related areas and indicated the directions of people's goals.

== Influence of Gestalt psychology on field theory ==
From the beginning Gestalt theory was psychologist Carl Stumpf's emphasis that a study in behavior should focus on the immediate experience of the agent. Stumpf along with his students, notably Wertheimer and Köhler, went on to develop the school of thought known as Gestalt psychology at the Berlin School of Psychology.

Many of the principles of Gestalt psychology emerged to challenge the dominant behaviorist view of the time. What underlie behaviorism was what Wertheimer called the “mosaic thesis” of perception and experience where the relation between elements are seen as “associations” without real consideration of the content of the elements. Under this view learned behavior is initially acquired by chance. Yet even when, through chance, an animal acts in a way that leads them closer to their goal, they do not realize that they are now closer to their objective. In other words, the animal does not act based on understanding of the situation— the sequence of action is strung together by accident and therefore meaningless. Therefore, behaviorism predicts a “continuous transition between random and useful behavior”. Interestingly, rat mazes used in behaviorist experiments were designed such it was impossible to obtain a survey of the entire layout, a situation rarely found in nature.

In contrast with this view of behavior as random associations was Köhler's argument of the central role that comprehension has in shaping behavior. Köhler argues that a subject (animal or person) goes through a distinct shift in the direction of their behavior when they suddenly gain insight in the form of perceiving the entire picture of a situation.

Furthermore, fields are not just ways of succinctly describing complex data and making prediction from the observer's perspective but is also something that is felt by the actors. We feel physically drawn towards or away from the object that anchors a field of force. Köhler gives the example of when an animal moves closer to a desired object, they may be drawn to the object in a way that prevents them from moving further away from the object to circumvent an intervening obstacle. Another example that he gives is when a nice boss avoids eye contact when delivering criticism to an employee.

== Influence of physics on field theory ==
The principles of Lewin's field theory is connected with his call for psychology to shift from an Aristotelian view of science to a Galilean one. While both views have historically informed physics, the first view is associated with Medieval physics while the latter view has played an influential role in shaping modern physics. Aristotelian physics understands objects through classification— it argues that the category of an object captures its essence and determines its behavior. The construction of these categories are shaped by normative ethics, with categories carrying dichotomous connotations of good and bad. Lewin argues that the influence of this mode of thinking on psychology can be seen where behaviors can be classified as either normal or pathological, and feelings are classified as pleasant or unpleasant. Associated with classification is the practice of studying discrete substances rather than relational dynamics. In psychology, this is reflected in the practice of studying different aspects of psychology such as “memory, intelligence and impulse” separate from one another.

On the other hand, in contrast with categorical thinking, Galilean physics emphasizes structural and relational thinking and understanding elements based on the functional role they play. Understanding reality through its dynamic and continuous processes replace absolute and rigid categories. Galilean physics also posits the existence of universal laws that govern the physical world.

This underlies what Lewin calls the “conditional-genetic” approach of explaining causation, which is central to his field theory. In contrast with the Aristotelian descriptive approach which would attribute different causations to planets orbiting, objects falling and pendulum oscillating given their different surface-level appearance (what Lewin describes as their “phenotypic” presentation), a conditional-genetic approach would recognize these phenomena as “various expressions of the same law”.

Lewin points out that the use of mathematical quantification is not a fundamental difference between the Aristotelian and Galilean view since Aristotelian physics can also be represented mathematically. The impulse to quantify in modern physics can be better attributed to the desire to understand “concrete particular cases” in a world governed by universal laws. Overall, Lewin calls for psychology to follow the direction of modern physics towards “a transition from an abstract classificatory procedure to an essentially concrete constructive model”.

== Main principles ==
=== The life space ===
The main idea is that an individual's behavior at a given moment is manifested through the interconnected factors that make up the current "life space" or "psychological field." So a person's life space is the combination of all the factors that influence the person's behavior at any time. Behavior can be expressed as a function of the life space B=ƒ(LS). Furthermore, the interaction between the person (P) and the environment (E) constitute life space. Therefore, in symbolic expression, B=ƒ(LS)=F(P,E).

The environment (E) in a person's life space has its basis in the objective physical world that the actor is situated in. However the actual representation and organization of the physical world in their life space is mediated by the subjective experience of the person (P). At the same time, the environment also shapes the person. Field theory holds that behavior (B) must be derived from a totality interconnected factors. Furthermore, behavior depends on the present field rather than on the past or the future.

The relation between person and environment represents the situation at a given moment. Therefore, behavior can also be understood as a function of the entire situation that a person is in. To understand behavior therefore involves capturing all aspects of the situation, which includes the physical, social and psychological situation.

==== Physical situation ====
The physical situation includes the person's immediate physical environment as well as the larger geographical environment that they are situated in. Factors in their immediate environment can include objects in the environment that a person consciously perceives, but can also include familiar objects that are outside of one's immediate field of vision, for example a calendar that is hung on the wall behind the person or a building outside their window. The larger environment can encompass the location of the house, city or country that the person is in. The physical environment can impose physical barriers that constraints a person's movement, as in the case of Jewish ghettos that many European Jews were confined to during and prior to WWII.

Social situation

The social situation may include the person's social relations or social position in society, including their occupation. It can also include social factors at the present moment, including ones that are not at the forefront of the actor's awareness at the moment. For example, a child playing in the backyard behaves differently depending on whether the mother is at home, even if they are not constantly conscious of this. Another example would be the general social atmosphere (e.g. friendliness or tension) which one may not consciously perceive at the moment and only become aware of when it changes. Lewin's research has identified leadership style as an influential factor shaping the atmosphere of a group. Experimental psychology studies have shown the formation of aspiration, the driving factor of actions and expressions (behavior), is directly influenced by the presence or absence of certain individuals within one's life space.

Social interaction can be represented as the conjoining of multiple individuals’ life spaces. An example of this is when two people's experience of a situation can become one when they converse together. This does not happen if the two people do not interact with each other, such as being in the same room but not talking to each other. This combined space can be "built" up as the two people share more ideas and create a more complex life-space together.

Psychological situation

Lastly, the psychological situation may encompass the actor's personality, “fears, thoughts, ideals and daydreams”, and the content and degree of their aspirations.

When constructing a person's life space at a given moment, only the factors that affect the person's actions at the moment should be taken into account. Lewin refers to these as the “conditional-genetic characteristics” that capture the underlying reality of a situation, in contrast with “phenotypic” surface-level appearances. In Lewin's words, according to the perspective of field theory, “what is real is what has effects”.

== Topology ==
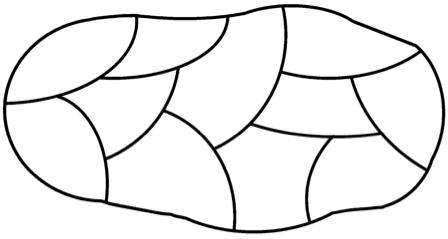
Field Theory Image 1

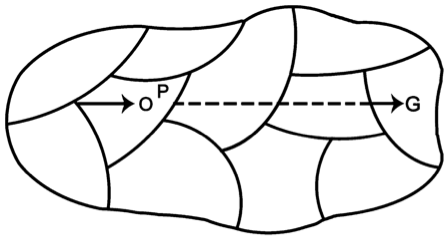
Field Theory Image 2

Central to Lewin's method of conceptualizing field theory is his use of topology to represent a person's field. A field can be described as a space of possible actions as perceived by the actor.

In a typical topological representation of a person's field, the person is positioned in a space of actions in which possible actions at a given moment are those that are directly adjacent to the actor. In the process of traversing through the space of actions, new sets of actions then become available to the actor. Lewin posits that this space of actions is based on a person's cognitive structure— that is, their perception of the situation that they are in. Therefore, the space is dynamic insofar as people's perception of their situation fluctuates.

Valence

Each action can be characterized by their valence, which can be positive, compelling the actor towards the action, or negative- repelling the actor away from the action.

Force

Each action can also be characterized by their force, which describes the intensity associated with the valence, i.e. the extent that the actor is driven towards or away from the action. A person's level of aspiration may influence the strength of the force associated with certain actions. For example, a person with high aspirations may be more driven towards and persistent in a challenging yet rewarding task compared to a person with low aspirations.

Goal

A person's sequence of actions is often motivated by a goal that they are striving towards— in other words, an actor moves across the space of actions in order to arrive at a goal state. Arriving at the goal region can also be conceptualized as achieving a state of equilibrium. Before arriving at the goal, the actor experiences disequilibrium in the form of tension, which drives them to move away from their current position in the space of actions.

There can also be situations where there is no goal that directs the actor's overall direction of movement. Relatedly, there can be situations where the actor has a goal but does not know how to arrive at the goal. In this case the person's unstable cognitive structure leads to a constantly changing field of actions— there is no stable perception of the valence and force of actions. These scenarios can manifest psychologically in a person in their rapidly shifting of attitudes towards different possible actions they can take. This results in behavior that is incoherent, oscillating or inefficient.

The evolution of life space over different life stages

Lewin gives the example of an adolescence's topology of free movement to illustrate how different life stages can shape a person's perception of their space of available actions. In this example, a child's space of free movement is limited— there are a limited number of activities that they are permitted to engage in. As they reach adolescence, their space of possible actions changes. Many actions become available— in this sense the space of possible actions expands. For example, they can now vote, drive a car and buy cigarettes. Other actions however become unavailable. For example, they are no longer socially allowed to act in a childish way. The rapid change in possibilities of action characterizes the adolescence.The fluctuating nature of their space of free movement can explain their fluctuating behavior and attitudes, and lack of goals. Depending on the person's upbringing (e.g. their exposure to and therefore familiarity towards the adult world) there can also be ambiguity in what their perceived available actions are. This again highlighting the interconnected relation between social and cognitive factors of Lewin's conception of life space.

== Influences and reception ==
Philosophers and psychologists of field theory, gestalt theory and phenomenology have historically been in close dialogue with one another, mutually shaping their respective areas of study. Phenomenology, a discipline that takes subjective perception as the foundation of human consciousness heavily influenced the origins of Gestalt theory, which laid the foundations of Lewin's field theory. Subsequently, many of Lewin's ideas went on to influence phenomenology. In particular, Lewin's concept of hodological space(i.e. topological space) has been taken up by philosophers including Sartre and Heidegger. Sartre uses the term in Being and Nothingness to emphasize the way in which a person's perceptual experience of space is shaped by their behavior and goals, which are rooted in emotion. Principles from field theory, together with phenomenology and existentialism, also form the cornerstone of Gestalt therapy.

There is also a version of field theory in sociology developed by Pierre Bourdieu. Rather than being directly influenced by Lewin or the other Gestalt psychologists, he was most likely exposed to the principles of field and gestalt theory via phenomenologists Merleau-Ponty and Sartre. Regardless both Bourdieu and Lewin's field theory are compatible with the principles of field theory that underlie electromagnetism and gestalt theory. At the core of field theory is a relational view of space. Furthermore, given this view, field theory functions as a method that seeks to analyze the interdependent dynamic of elements, and their relation to the whole. However, in contrast with Lewin's theory which analyzes the psychological field of an individual (i.e. their life space), Bourdieu's theory analyzes social fields, such as the field of education, literature, or religion. A social field is a domain in the social world that contains a set of rules which organizes the practices of members in that domain. Similar to many other parts of sociology, Bourdieu's field theory also views fields as sites of power struggle and competition, particularly over the status of rules, highlighting conflict as a basic component of social dynamics in real life.

Social psychologist Gordon Allport lays out two criticisms centered around Lewin's focus on phenomenology in explaining action. The first criticism concerns the level of explanation that a phenomenological approach such as field theory can provide. With its focus on taking into account all the aspects of a given moment in determining behavior, such an approach is able to capturing proximate causes of behavior, but cannot get at the underlying ultimate causes of behavior. It cannot ascertain “the origin of these factors”, why they reoccur overtime, or the function that it may serve in the person's life.

Allport's second criticism questions how much subjective experience is actually taken into account when explaining behavior using field theory. Lewin often stresses the primacy of subjective experience in shaping action, given that situational factors are filtered through the lens of subjective perception. Yet Allport argues that in practice studies typically focus on situational factors, leaving out the subjective organization of the situational factors. Because of the difficulty in accurately capturing a person's subjective experience, we can often only infer them based on behavior in a situational context. Furthermore, when this happens, what is really a representation of situational factors is mistakenly confused as a representation of a person's phenomenological field. An example of this confusion, Allport argues, can be found in Lewin's seminal work on the effects of democratic and autocratic leaders on group atmosphere.

Sociologist John Levi Martin's more recent evaluation of field theory criticizes Lewin's usage of topography as “theoretically ambiguous” and its usage of vector analysis as mathematical formalization that is “overly precise” yet not particularly useful. Yet overlooking Lewin's attempt on mathematization, Levi Martin recognizes Lewin's contribution towards overcoming behaviorism— Lewin achieves this by emphasizing actors and their psychological worlds as affective, conceptualizing their behavior as spatial movement aimed toward a desired position, and offering a new causal framework by understanding behavior not as being “caused by something in the past” but as a product of the “totality of the current situation”.

== See also ==
- Force-field analysis
- Humanistic psychology

== Major publications ==
- Lewin, K. (1935). A dynamic theory of personality. New York: McGraw-Hill.
- Lewin, K. (1936). Principles of topological psychology. New York: McGraw-Hill.
- Lewin, K. (1938). The conceptual representation and measurement of psychological forces. Durham, NC: Duke University Press.
- Lewin, K. (1951). Field theory in social science. New York: Harper.
