= British Journal of Health Psychology =

- Discipline: Health psychology
- Language: English
- Edited by: Madelynne Arden, Joseph Chilcot

Publication details
- History: 1996-present
- Publisher: Wiley-Blackwell
- Frequency: Quarterly
- Impact factor: 2.472 (2018)

Standard abbreviations
- ISO 4: Br. J. Health Psychol.

Indexing
- CODEN: BJHPFP
- ISSN: 1359-107X (print); 2044-8287 (web)
- LCCN: 96642289
- OCLC no.: 1016296280

Links
- Journal homepage; Online access; Online archive

The British Journal of Health Psychology is a quarterly peer-reviewed scientific journal covering health psychology. It was established in 1996, when it was split off from the existing British Journal of Clinical Psychology. It is published by Wiley-Blackwell on behalf of the British Psychological Society. The editors-in-chief are Madelynne Arden (Sheffield Hallam University) and Joseph Chilcot (King's College London). According to the Journal Citation Reports, the journal has a 2018 impact factor of 2.472, ranking it 45th out of 130 journals in the category "Psychology, Clinical".
