= James O. Prochaska =

American psychologist (1942–2023)

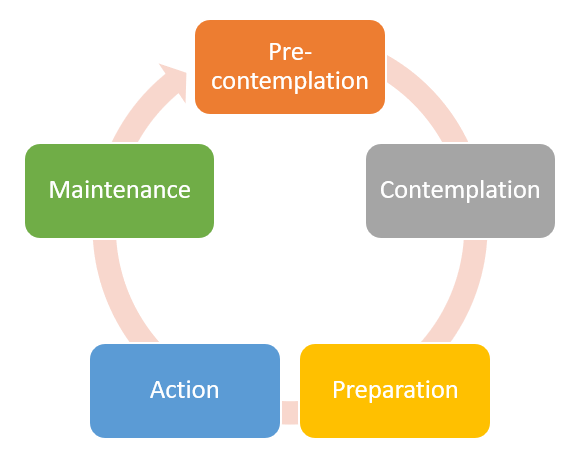
The transtheoretical model of James Prochaska and Carlo Di Clemente.

James O. Prochaska (6 August 1942 – 9 July 2023) was professor of psychology at the University of Rhode Island. He was the lead developer of the Transtheoretical Model of Behavior Change (TTM) beginning in 1983.

== Career ==
James Prochaska was born in Detroit. He earned his B.A. in psychology at Wayne State University in 1964, followed by his M.A. (1967) and Ph.D. Degrees (1969) both at Wayne State University. He is the author or co-author of over 400 publications on the dynamics of behavioral change - most of which expand the theory, test the TTM in randomized controlled trials, and defend the TTM.

== Selected publications ==
- Prochaska, J.O. and DiClemente, C.C. (1984). The transtheoretical approach: Crossing the traditional boundaries of therapy. Melbourne, Florida: Krieger Publishing Company.
- Prochaska, J.O., Norcross, J.C. & DiClemente, C.C. (1994). Changing for Good. New York: Morrow. ISBN 0-688-11263-3Prochaska, J.O., & Norcross, J.C. (2018). Systems of psychotherapy: A transtheoretical analysis (Ninth Edition) UK: Oxford University Press.
- Prochaska, J.O., & Prochaska, J.M. (2016). Changing to Thrive. Center City: Hazelden Publishing.

See also his scientific publications list in google scholar.

== Awards ==
Dr. Prochaska has won awards including the Top Five Most Cited Authors in Psychology from the American Psychology Society, an Innovator's Award from the Robert Wood Johnson Foundation and was the first psychologist to win the Medal of Honor for Clinical Research from the American Cancer Society.

Dr. Prochaska is the principal investigator on over $80 million in research grants for the prevention of cancer and other chronic diseases. He founded Pro-Change Behavior Systems, Inc. in 1997.
