= Bluma Zeigarnik =

Soviet psychologist (1901–1988)

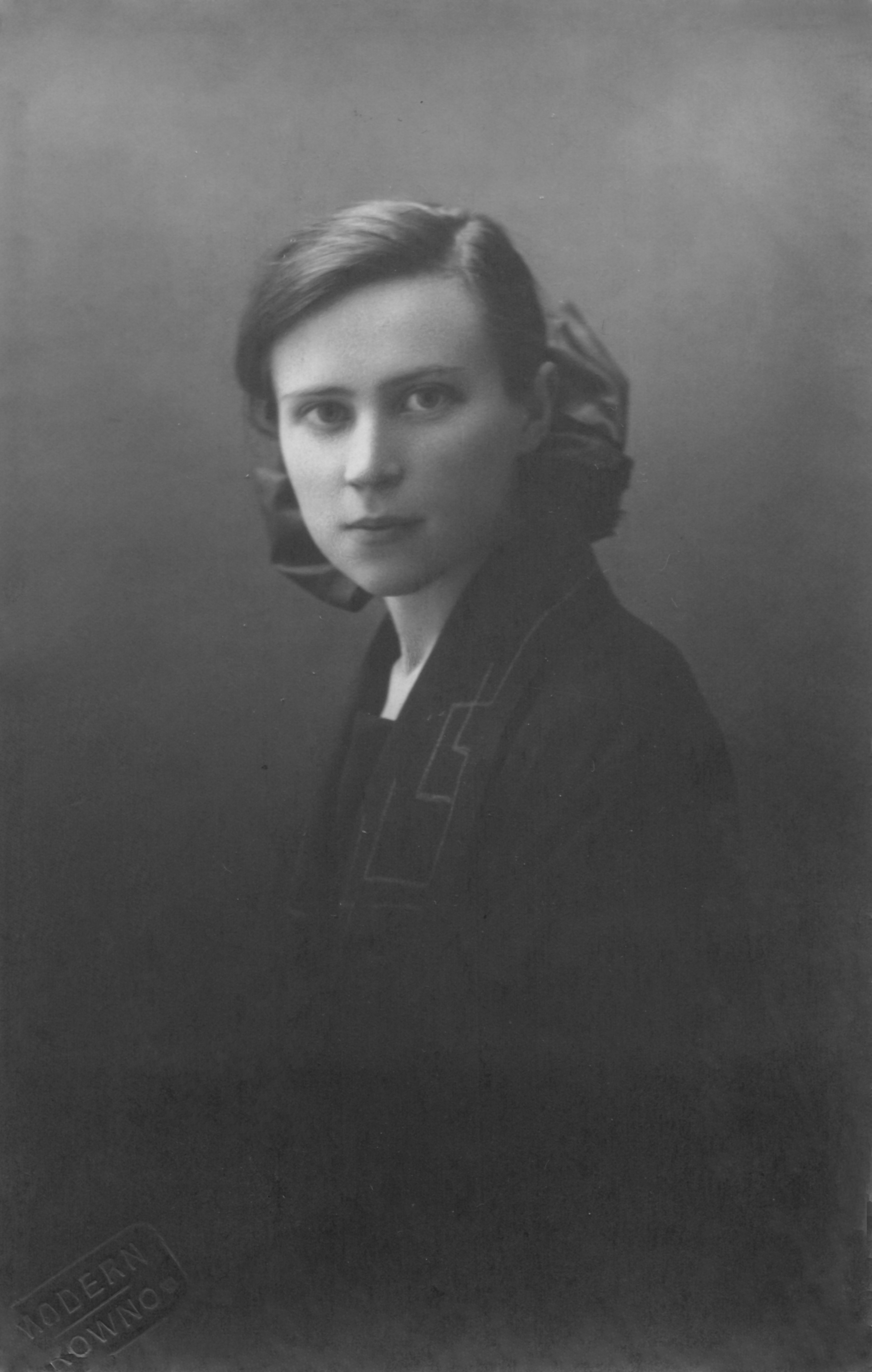
- Zeigarnik c. 1921
- Born: Zhenya Bluma Gerštein; 9 November 1900; Prienai, Suwałki Governorate, Russian Empire
- Died: 24 February 1988 (aged 87); Moscow, Russian SFSR, Soviet Union
- Known for: Zeigarnik effect, member of the Vygotsky Circle

Academic background
- Education: University of Berlin
- Academic advisor: Kurt Lewin

Academic work
- Discipline: Psychopathology

Bluma Zeigarnik (Russian: Блюма Вульфовна Зейгарник, IPA: [ˈblʲumə ˈvulʲfəvnə zʲɪjˈɡarnʲɪk]; 9 November [O.S. 27 October] 1900 – 24 February 1988) was a Soviet psychologist and a member of the Berlin school of experimental psychology and the so-called Vygotsky Circle. She contributed to the establishment of experimental psychopathology as a separate discipline in the Soviet Union in the post-World War II period.

In the 1920s she conducted a study on memory, in which she compared memory in relation to interrupted and completed tasks. She had found that interrupted tasks are remembered better than completed ones; this is now known as the Zeigarnik effect. From 1931 she worked in the Soviet Union. She is considered one of the co-founders of the Department of Psychology at the Moscow State University. In 1983 she received the Lewin Memorial Award for her psychological research.

== Early life and education ==
Zeigarnik was born as Ženya Bluma Gerštein into a Jewish family in Prienai in Suwałki Governorate of the Russian Empire (present-day Lithuania) to Wulf Gerštein and Ronya Feiga Rozengard, as their only child. Her primary languages were Yiddish and Russian, although she was also able to speak Lithuanian and Polish. Bluma's parents informally adopted her future husband, Albert Zeigarnik, and paid for education of both children abroad.

In her autobiographic note, which she wrote in 1927 as it was required for her doctorate thesis and which is available from the archive of the Humboldt University of Berlin, she wrote that until she was 15, she took private lessons, and in 1916, she entered the fifth grade of Reimann–Dalmatov Gymnasium in Minsk, which she left in 1918 after passing the final exam. From 1920 to 1922, she attended lectures at the Department of Humanities of Lithuanian Higher Courses of Study in Kaunas (now Vytautas Magnus University).

In May 1922, the future couple left for Berlin, where he studied at the Polytechnic Institute and she at the University of Berlin. They married in Kaunas on January 9, 1924. At the University of Berlin, she met Kurt Lewin and upon graduation assisted him in his experimental work. She graduated in 1925 and received a Doctoral degree from the same university in 1927. She described the Zeigarnik effect in a thesis prepared under the Lewin's supervision.

== Later life ==
In May 1931, Zeigarnik relocated from Berlin to Moscow, where she started to work closely with Lev Vygotsky at the Institute of Higher Nervous Activity belonging to the Section of Natural Science of the Communist Academy, at the Psychoneurological Hospital of the All-Union Institute of Experimental Medicine (existed in Moscow in 1932–1944), and from the 1940s, at the Institute of Psychiatry in Moscow.

In 1940, Zeigarnik's husband Albert was arrested and sentenced (on February 26, 1942) by the Special Council of the NKVD to 10 years in prison in a Gulag labor camp, "as an agent of foreign intelligence and for espionage activities" (rehabilitated on June 27, 1956). By this time, they had two children, one six years old (born in 1934) and the other less than a year old (born in 1939); she was left to take care of them by herself. Albert died in the camp in the 1940s.

During World War II, Zeigarnik and her children were evacuated from Moscow. At that period, she worked together with Alexander Luria and other psychologists in the Neurosurgical Hospital No. 3120 in Evacuation in the village of Kisegach, Chelyabinsk oblast, where she was engaged in the restoration of cognitive and mental functions after brain injuries and rehabilitation treatment of the wounded.

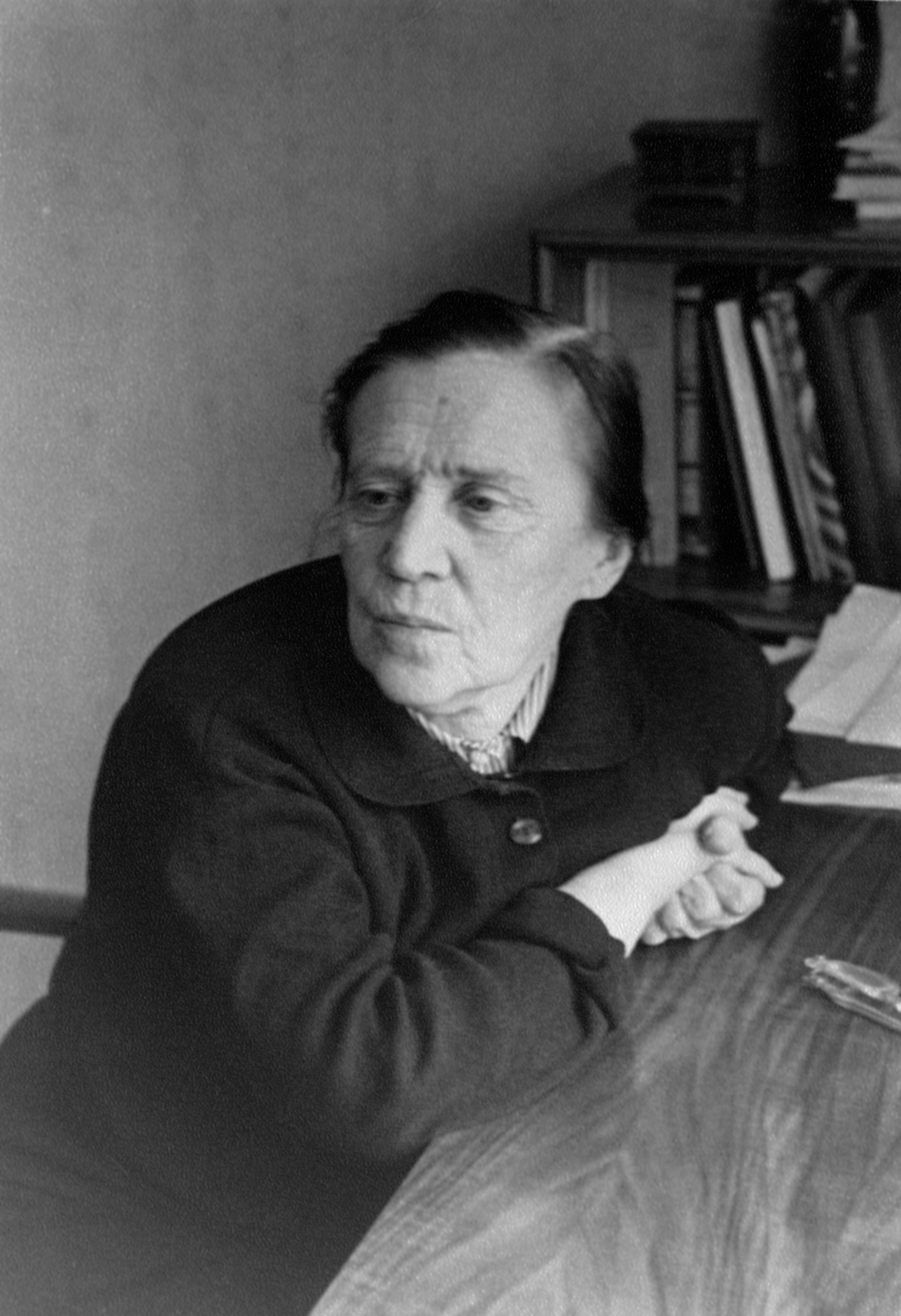
Zeigarnik in the 1980s

Zeigarnik died in Moscow on February 24, 1988.

== Influences ==
One of Zeigarnik's first influences was Kurt Lewin, who Zeigarnik met in 1924 at University of Berlin. During this time, Lewin was a teacher and a researcher. Zeigarnik liked his progressive views and started her scientific career within his research group. It was with Lewin that she developed her well-known theory: the Zeigarnik effect. Not only was Lewin the main influence in Zeigarnik life, but he was also a good friend. Another Influence of Zeigarnik was Lev Vygotsky. Zeigarnik met and started working with him, as well as with Alexander Luria and Alexei Leontyev in 1931. Together they studied topics involving mental structures and general psychology. Their research also allowed Zeigarnik to create and name her own field of psychology.

== Research and contributions ==
In the 1920s, Zeigarnik continued her study under Lewin's supervision and was able to conduct a study on memory in which she compared memory in relation to interrupted and completed tasks and found that people tend to remember interrupted tasks better than those that are completed. This finding became known as Zeigarnik effect.

In the 1930s, she began to work at the Institute of Higher Nervous Activity, where she was influenced by Vygotsky. Being influenced by Vygotsky, she started to work on various problems related to pathologies of reasoning, psychotic and personality disorders, post-traumatic silliness, etc. Gita Birenbaum, another Lewin's disciple and a graduate of the University of Berlin, was a close collaborator of her.

In 1940, Zeigarnik started to publish works on the effects of brain injuries. Her studies continued in 1941–1943 in the Neurosurgical Hospital No. 3120 in Evacuation organized by Alexander Luria. Her primary interest was the loss of spontaneity upon military injuries of the frontal lobes of the brain. Another area of her research in the hospital was reactive post-concussion deaf-muteness. By the end of the 1940s, she accumulated considerable knowledge that allowed her to compare pathologies in patients with and without military traumas. As a result of these studies, she prepared a doctor-of-sciences dissertation, but the text was stolen shortly before its completion. In 1950, upon the beginning of an antisemitic campaign in the Soviet Union, Zeigarnik stopped heading the laboratory, and in 1953, she was fired from the Institute of Psychiatry. The same year she returned to work at the institute upon Stalin's death.

By 1959, she prepared yet another doctor-of-sciences dissertation titled "Thinking disorders in the mentally ill." In her dissertation work, Zeigarnik described the results of a study of 710 patients who were diagnosed with schizophrenia, epilepsy, cerebrovascular disease, brain injury, intellectual disability, encephalitis, progressive paralysis, manic depressive psychosis, and personality disorders. In fact, she participated in the studies of other patients and other themes as well during the same period: the issues of self-regulation, mediation of behavior (the term mediation was introduced by Lev Vygotsky), organization of treatment for patients with nervous and mental diseases, etc. Zeigarnik considered three main categories of thinking disorders: distortion of the generalization process, distortion of the logical structure of thinking, and distortion of goal-oriented thinking. She explored which subcategories of these three main categories are characteristic of certain diseases and how best to identify them. It turned out that there are no thinking disorders that would be characteristic of only one diagnosed disease. Yet, for each disease, some are more typical and others are less. Comparison of experimental psychological and clinical data made it possible to diagnose diseases more effectively. Experimental data led Zeigarnik to conclude that the usual division of mental activity into separate processes is artificial and does not allow a consistent description of the disintegration of thinking. Thinking disintegrates not as a separate process but as an activity. Largely due to the research of Zeigarnik, in the 1940–1950s in the Soviet Union, there was an accumulation of a large array of systematically built research data, which later formed the basis of experimental abnormal psychology and hugely expanded during the next decades.

In the next few years, Zeigarnik published several monographs and textbooks for university education devoted to the psychology of various types of disorders in mentally ill patients, including the disorders of consciousness, personality, perception, and memory. These works recorded the accumulation of experimental material, the development of concepts and methodologies of research, as well as formulated the tasks and possibilities of psychological tests and experiments, the role of pathopsychological research for understanding psychology in the norm and for the development of psychiatry: Thinking Disorders in the Mentally Ill (1958), The Pathology of Thinking (1962), Introduction to Abnormal Psychology (1969), Personality and the Pathology of Activity (1971), Foundations to Abnormal Psychology (1973), Essays on the Psychology of Abnormal Personality Development (1980), Abnormal Psychology (1968).

Zeigarnik criticized psychological research, in which the main emphasis was not on the experiment but rather on the measurement and correlation of individual characteristics or personality traits. She considered it mandatory to use a set of techniques and believed that a pathopsychological study should include several components: an experiment, an interview of a patient, an observation of the patient's behavior during the study, an analysis of the life story of a sick person (which is a professionally written medical history by a doctor and a clinical record), and comparison of experimental data with the patient's history of life. From her point of view, it is very important (although not always possible) to conduct research in dynamics, that is, to see the same person in a year or two. The experiment must take into account the fundamental indivisibility of the psyche into separate components and, therefore, cannot be reduced to measuring the characteristics of its individual components. At the same time, she criticized speculative psychological research: theories and ideas that were not in connection with systematic experimental studies. Zeigarnik pointed out that the most fruitful studies are those related to the analysis of the intellectual sphere (associated with sensations, perceptions, ideas, concepts and their combination, and speech), and not with the more volatile emotional sphere (moods, feelings, and drives). In her opinion, the main principle of constructing a pathopsychological experiment is the principle of a qualitative analysis of the course of the patient's mental processes, as opposed to the task of merely measuring their scores. In addition to the complexity of tasks that the patient was able to comprehend or complete, she considered important to know what caused the patient's mistakes and what was difficult. In contrast to healthy subjects, whose usual attitude toward the experiment is to accept tasks and follow instructions, mental patients sometimes ignore or misinterpret tasks or sometimes actively resist instructions. Zeigarnik pointed out that the pathopsychological experiment is a joint two-way activity of the experimentalist and the subject, and the situation of the pathopsychological experiment is a segment of real life. Therefore, the experiment should not fix some static psychological states, but rather should be formative. Diagnostic tests, according to her idea, should be carried out as psychological experiments in the Vygotskian sense.

Zeigarnik's work provided great service to her country and as a pathophysiology, she established the use of her work in medical care, specifically in clinical work. Zeigarnik's copious experience helped her present the stages of development of Russian Psychology. Her work had a clinical focus which helped psychiatric health professionals focus their attention on mental health issues. In addition, she continued to teach and concentrated on the importance of mental health and clinical practice. Later, Zeigarnik concluded that the importance of taking personality assessment of the patient's psychological state and general understanding of their defect structure was key. Zeigarnik stated that, "Any problem suggested by psychiatric practice, whether it concerns the examination of disability, or the study of the structure of remission, or the effectiveness of treatment - the data of psychological study comes useful only at once, when and where they suggest a qualification of the whole personality rather than a certain mental process".

== Zeigarnik effect ==
In psychology, the Zeigarnik effect states that people remember uncompleted or interrupted tasks better than completed tasks (this effect should not be confused with the Ovsiankina effect). In Gestalt psychology, the Zeigarnik effect has been used to demonstrate the general presence of Gestalt phenomena: not just appearing as perceptual effects, but also present in cognition.

== Awards and honors ==
In 1978, Zeigarnik received the Lomonosov award from the Moscow State University.

In 1980, Zeigarnik attended at the Leipzig International Congress of Psychology, the first and one of the few opportunities to travel outside of the Soviet Union and meet foreign colleagues. There she met June Louin Tapp, a professor at the University of Minnesota and the Chair of the Kurt Lewin Memorial Award Committee, who was surprised to discover that she was a woman and one of Kurt Lewin's last living Berlin students. In 1983, June Louin Tapp announced her as the Kurt Lewin Memorial Awardee. Although she was not allowed to travel outside of the Soviet Union, she received the diploma and financial support. Each awardee usually presented a paper, and Zeigarnik submitted her article, largely based on her book "The Theory of Personality of Kurt Lewin" (in Russian).

== Selected publications ==
- 1927: Das Behalten erledigter und unerledigter Handlungen. Psychologische Forschung 9, 1–85.
- 1965: The Pathology of Thinking. New York: Consultants Bureau Enterprises.
- 1972: Experimental Abnormal Psychology. New York: Plenum Press.
- 1984: Kurt Lewin and Soviet psychology. Journal of Social Issues 40 (2), 181–192.

== Sources ==
- Zeigarnik, B. (1938). On finished and unfinished tasks. A source book of Gestalt psychology, 1, 1-15
- Denmark, F. L. & Russo, N. F. (1987). Contributions of Women to Psychology. Annual Review of Psychology Vol. 38: 279-298
- Baumeister, R.F., & Bushman, B.J. (2008). Social Psychology and Human Nature. United States: Thomson Wadsworth.
- Johnson, P.B., Mehrabian, A., Weiner, B. (1968). Achievement Motivation and the Recall of Incompleted and Completed Exam Questions. Journal of Educational Psychology, 59(3), 181–185.
- Burke, W. W. (2011). A perspective on the field of organization development and change: The Zeigarnik effect. Journal of Applied Behavioral Science, 47(2), 143–167.
- Nikolaeva, V. V. (2011). B.W. Zeigarnik and pathopsychology. Psychology In Russia: State Of The Art, 4176-192.
