= Hodological space =

Space of "preferred paths" in psychology

In psychology, hodological space (from the Greek word hodos, which means "way") refers to the space of possible movement. Unlike the straight line, this space involves the so-called "preferred paths", which serve as a compromise of different domains that include shortest distance, security, minimal work, and maximum experience.

== Background ==
The German gestalt psychologist Kurt Lewin first introduced this concept in the early part of the 20th century prior to his exile in the United States. It emerged in his attempt to use mathematical concepts to deal with psychological problems and was based on Albert Einstein's notion of "field space" and mathematics from modern topology theory. It was also based on his idea that Euclidean space is hardly experienced by humans since built physical spaces do not accommodate following a straight line.

As a measurement system, the hodological space was used by Lewin to expand the nonquantitative but mathematical representation of structure and position in psychology so that it includes the dynamic and vectorial aspects of the field. At the time, topology was a new field, "To some degree it is possible to give a general mathematical solution using a kind of space which is defined through the possible paths between points, and which one may call 'hodological space.'" Lewin's conceptualization identify hodological space as a space that matters, as paths that link people together or distances that keep them apart. Otto Friedrich Bollnow further refined Lewin's notion and described the hodological space as not something that is homogenous nor predetermined since it is extemporaneously expressed as we move through space.

Some authors cite the affinity of hodological space with elements in ancient Greek theater such as the skene structure, which connects onstage and offstage areas; the ekkyklema, a contraption that allowed "inside-out" disclosures; and, the eisodoi, which lead to and from the distance.

The philosopher Jean-Paul Sartre likewise pulls from Lewin's concept in his essay, "Sketch for a Theory of Emotions," wherein he depicts the phenomenological sense or experience of lived-space as being "hodological" in nature. In this experience, all individuals bear a "hodological map" as they exist in any given environment - meaning individuals possess a sub-cognitive and non-representation lived-sense of the pathways of action, instrumental availabilities, closures, openings, potentialities, blockages, varying alternative routes, etc., where this lived sense of space is organized around one's projects. By implication, two individuals occupying the same external space will possess a different phenomenological sense of that space, where this is marked out in accordance with their hodological map - an idea fundamentally similar in kind to Heidegger and his concept of "equipmentality." To make this concrete - when in an environment, say a room, one has a sense of the surrounding rooms, what is in them, what is available to use, what is not, what are the different pathways of action and threat, or where blockages might occur, wherein the actual degree and level to which these possible dynamics come to play within a singular moment of experience, one that is being experienced by an agent right now, in this place, will vary in accordance with the projects and plans of that agent (e.g. a bank robber, a worker, a customer, and a police officer all in the exact same bank). Hence Sartre's use of "Hodological" is trying to hit upon this lived-existential and subjective sense of lived-space that is distinct from scientific, objective, and measurable space, as assumed from a 3rd person perspective. The hodological space has no fixed set of coordinates independent of any particular subject and, instead, there is a constantly varying field of force of the experiencing subject.

According to Gilles Deleuze, the hodological space concretely holds the sensory-motor schema as the field of forces, oppositions, and tensions are resolved according to their goals.

== Concepts ==
A penetrable space can be perceived in two different ways: navigable and navigated. The navigated perception is realized by the hodological space while the former by ambient space. An ambient space or ambient configuration space is the space surrounding an object. According to this conceptualization, we do not move within a hodological space but that it is created once we move through an ambient space. The space is interpreted as "lived" and is distinguished from the Euclidean space, which is considered "represented". It is, thus, analogous to "seeing an object and making the hodological leap from this actuality to its virtual potentiality of the past in forming the sensory-motor connection."

Hodological space is articulated by a nonquantitative, mathematical analysis that does not necessarily involve the consideration of distance. Here, the distance of points A and B in terms of such space may be different from the distance from B to A. This could happen in certain instances such as when one feels that the distance from home to school is greater or shorter than the distance from school to home.

Hodological space is described as more general than the space of Euclid and Riemann [see metric space], but not as general as topological space, in which it is not possible to define distances or directions." It is noted that Lewin's conceptualization was more mental rather than a physical typology. According to Gilles Deleuze, the hodological space concretely holds the sensory-motor schema as the field of forces, oppositions, and tensions are resolved according to their goals. Drawing from Lewin's idea that hodological space is equated with conscious and planned movement across measurable Euclidean space, he believed that it can be applied to the ability to judge actions in moral terms. Deleuze also put forward the concept of time-image, which transpires prior to hodological space.

== Applications ==
Hodological space can be applied to different fields. For example, in the fields of literature and film, it typifies a narration or a speech that is referred to as "economical" allowing for the simplest route or an appropriate detour. According to Deleuze, hodological space addresses the issue of overlapping perspectives so that a given object can be effectively grasped.

Jean-Paul Sartre also used the concept of hodological space to explain his notion that consciousness is embodied. It is the basis of his argument that the individual is characterized through intentional and goal-directed activity - that goals or valences are positive if agents are drawn to them and negative if they are avoided.

In psychology, hodological space may be used to explain personal causality and the goal of being in a certain state or producing an effect.
