= Kurt Lewin =

German-American psychologist (1890–1947)

- Born: Kurt Tsadek Lewin; 9 September 1890; Mogilno, Province of Posen, German Empire (now Poland)
- Died: 12 February 1947 (aged 56); Newtonville, Massachusetts, U.S.
- Education: Friedrich Wilhelm University of Berlin
- Known for: Group dynamics; action research; Force-field analysis; T-groups
- Spouses: Maria Landsberg (m. 1917; div. 1927) Gertrud Weiss (m. 1929)
- Children: 4
- Scientific career
- Fields: Psychology
- Workplaces: Institute for Social Research; Center for Group Dynamics (MIT); National Training Laboratories; Cornell University; Duke University
- Thesis: Die psychische Tätigkeit bei der Hemmung von Willensvorgängen und das Grundgesetz der Assoziation (1916)
- Doctoral advisor: Carl Stumpf
- Doctoral students: Dorwin Cartwright; Leon Festinger; Bluma Zeigarnik
- Other notable students: Rudolf Arnheim; Morton Deutsch

Kurt Zadek Lewin or Kurt Tsadek Lewin (/ˈluːɪn, ləˈviːn/ LOO-in, lə-VEEN; German: [leˈviːn]; 9 September 1890 – 12 February 1947) was a German-American psychologist, known as one of the modern pioneers of social, organizational, and applied psychology in the United States. During his professional career, Lewin's academic research and writings focuses on applied research, action research, and group communication.

Lewin is often recognized as the "founder of social psychology" and was one of the first to study group dynamics and organizational development. A Review of General Psychology survey, published in 2002, ranked Lewin as the 18th-most cited psychologist of the 20th century. During his career, he was affiliated with several U.S. and European universities, including the University of Berlin, Cornell University, MIT, Stanford University, and the University of Iowa.

== Early life and education ==
Lewin was born in 1890 into a Jewish family in Mogilno, County of Mogilno, Province of Posen, Prussia in present-day Poland, a small town with then about 5,000 residents, about 150 of whom were Jewish. Lewin received an orthodox Jewish education at home. He was one of four children born into a middle-class family. His father owned a small general store, and the family lived in an apartment above the store. His father, Leopold, operated a farm jointly with his brother Max; however, the farm was legally owned by a Christian because Jews were not permitted to own farms at the time.

In 1905, Lewin moved with his family to Berlin, so Lewin and his brothers could receive a better education. From 1905 to 1908, Lewin studied at the Kaiserin Augusta Gymnasium, where he received a classical humanistic education. In 1909, he entered the University of Freiburg to study medicine, but transferred to the Ludwig-Maximilians-Universität München to study biology. At the Ludwig-Maximilians-Universität München, he became involved with the socialist and women's rights movements around this time.

In April 1910, Lewin transferred to the Royal Friedrich Wilhelm University of Berlin, where he was still a medical student. By the Easter semester of 1911, his interests had shifted toward philosophy. By the summer of 1911, the majority of his courses were in psychology. While at the Friedrich Wihelm University of Berlin, Lewin took 14 courses with Carl Stumpf (1848–1936).

When World War I began, he served in the Imperial German Army, during which he sustained a war wound and returned to the Friedrich Wilhelm University of Berlin to complete his PhD. Lewin wrote a dissertation proposal asking Stumpf to be his supervisor, and Stumpf assented. Even though Lewin worked under Stumpf to complete his dissertation, their relationship did not involve much communication. Lewin studied associations, will, and intention for his dissertation, but he did not discuss it with Stumpf until his final doctoral examination.

== Career ==
=== Academia ===
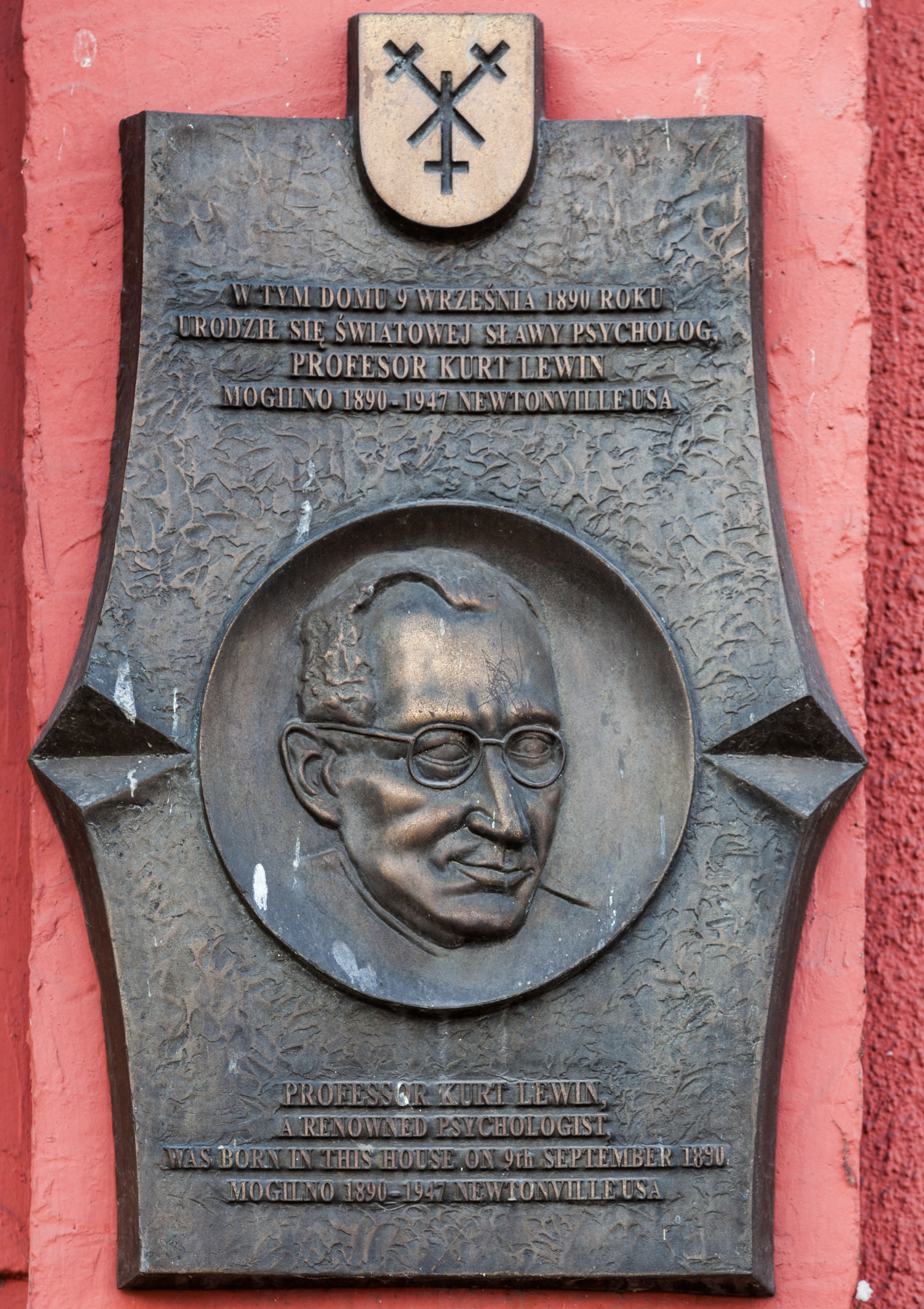
A tablet commemorating Lewin's birthplace in present-day Mogilno, Poland

Lewin was originally involved with schools of behavioral psychology before changing directions in research and undertaking work with psychologists of the Gestalt school of psychology, including Max Wertheimer and Wolfgang Köhler. He also joined the Psychological Institute of the Friedrich Wilhelm University of Berlin, where he lectured and gave seminars on both philosophy and psychology. He served as a professor at the Friedrich Wilhelm University of Berlin from 1926 to 1932, during which time he conducted experiments about tension states, needs, motivation, and learning.

In 1933, Lewin had tried to negotiate a teaching position as the chair of psychology and creating a research institute at Hebrew University in Jerusalem. Lewin often associated with the early Frankfurt School, originated by an influential group of largely Jewish Marxists at the Institute for Social Research in Germany. But when Adolf Hitler came to power in Nazi Germany in 1933, the Institute members disbanded, and moved to England and then to the United States. The same year, he met with Eric Trist, of the London Tavistock Clinic. Trist was impressed with his theories and went on to use them in his studies on soldiers during World War II.

In August 1933, Lewin immigrated to the U.S., where, in 1940, became a naturalized citizen. A few years after relocating to the U.S., Lewin began asking people to pronounce his name as "Lou-in" rather than "Le-veen" because the mispronunciation of his name by Americans had led to many missed phone calls. However, shortly before his death, he began requesting students and colleagues to use the correct pronunciation ("Le-veen") because that is the one he preferred. Earlier, in 1930, he spent six months as a visiting professor at Stanford University. After his immigration to the U.S., Lewin worked at Cornell University, the Iowa Child Welfare Research Station at the University of Iowa, and as director of the Center for Group Dynamics at MIT.

Following World War II, Lewin was involved in the psychological rehabilitation of former occupants of displaced persons camps with Dr. Jacob Fine at Harvard Medical School. When Trist and A T M Wilson wrote to Lewin proposing a journal in partnership with their newly founded Tavistock Institute and his group at MIT, Lewin agreed. The Tavistock journal, Human Relations, was founded with two early papers by Lewin entitled "Frontiers in Group Dynamics". Lewin taught for a time at Duke University.

Lewin coined the notion of genidentity, which has gained some importance in various theories of space-time and related fields. For instance, he introduced the concept of hodological space or the simplest route achieved through the resolution of different field of forces, oppositions, and tensions according to their goals.

Lewin also proposed Herbert Blumer's interactionist perspective of 1937 as an alternative to the nature versus nurture debate. Lewin suggested that neither nature (inborn tendencies) nor nurture (how experiences in life shape individuals) alone can account for individuals' behavior and personalities, but rather that both nature and nurture interact to shape each person. This idea was presented in the form of Lewin's equation for behavior, B = ƒ(P, E), which means that behavior (B) is a function (f) of personal characteristics (P), and environmental characteristics (E).

Scholars in the 1930s reveled in fear that, by devoting themselves to applied research, they would distract the discipline from basic research on scholarly problems and create a false binary on whether research was developed for the perpetuation of their respective discipline or for practical application. Despite this debate within the social sciences at the time, Lewin argued that "applied research could be conducted with rigor and that one could test theoretical propositions in applied research." The root of this particular binary seemed to stem from the epistemological norms present within the hard sciences – where the distinction was much more pronounced; Kurt Lewin argued that this was contrary to the nature of the social sciences. With the help of scholars, including Paul Lazarsfeld, there was a method through which money could be acquired for research in a sustainable manner. Lewin has encouraged researchers to develop theories that can be used to address important social problems.

To demonstrate his dedication to applied research and to further prove that there was value in testing his theoretical propositions, Lewin became a "master at transposing an everyday problem into a psychological experiment". Lewin, in his beginnings, took a seemingly banal moment between himself and a waiter and turned it into the beginnings of his field research, which Lewin reasoned that the "intention to carry out a specific task builds a psychological tension, which is released when the intended task is completed" in tandem with when Sigmund Freud theorized that "wishes persist until they are satisfied." This happenstance observation started the demonstration of the "existence of psychic tensions", fundamental to Lewin's field theory.

While applied research helped develop Lewin into a practical theorist, what further defined him as an academic and a forerunner was his action research, a term he invented himself. Lewin was increasingly interested in the concepts of Jewish migration and identity. He was confused by the concept of how while an individual distanced themselves from performing the Jewish identity in terms of religious expression and performance, they were still considered Jewish in the eyes of Nazis. This concept of denying one's identity and the promotion of self-loathing as a form of coping with a dominant group's oppression represented the crisis of Lewin's own migration to the United States. Lewin, as his student and colleague Ron Lippitt described, "had a deep sensitivity to social problems and a commitment to use his resources as a social scientist to do something about them.

In the early 1940s, he drew a triangle to represent the interdependence of research, training, and action in producing social change." This diagramming of an academic's interests and actions within this triangulation yields an interesting part of accessing Lewin and his contributions. Rather than noting social justice as the beginning or the end, it was ingrained in every single academic action that Lewin took. It was this particular world view and paradigm that furthered his research and determined precisely how he was going to utilize the findings from his field research. Furthermore, it all reflected upon Lewin the man and his way of coping with the events of his time period. This devotion to action research was possibly a way of resolving a dissonance of his own passage to America and how he left his own back in present-day Poland.

Prominent psychologists mentored by Lewin included Leon Festinger (1919–1989), who became known for his cognitive dissonance theory (1956), environmental psychologist Roger Barker, Bluma Zeigarnik, and Morton Deutsch, the founder of modern conflict resolution theory and practice.

=== Force-field analysis ===
Force-field analysis provides a framework for looking at the factors ("forces") that influence a situation, originally social situations. It looks at forces that are either driving movement toward a goal (helping forces) or blocking movement toward a goal (hindering forces). Key to this approach was Lewin's interest in gestaltism, understanding the totality and assessing a situation as a whole and not focusing only on individual aspects. Further, the totality for an individual (their life space) derives from their perception of their reality, not an objective viewpoint. The approach, developed by Kurt Lewin, is a significant contribution to the fields of social science, psychology, social psychology, organizational development, process management, and change management. His theory was expanded by John R. P. French who related it to organizational and industrial settings.

=== Action research ===
Lewin, then a professor at MIT, first coined the term action research in about 1944, and it appears in his 1946 paper "Action Research and Minority Problems". In that paper, he described action research as "a comparative research on the conditions and effects of various forms of social action and research leading to social action" that uses "a spiral of steps, each of which is composed of a circle of planning, action, and fact-finding about the result of the action" (this is sometimes referred to as the Lewinian spiral).

=== Leadership climates ===
Lewin often characterized organizational management styles and cultures in terms of leadership climates defined by (1) authoritarian, (2) democratic and (3) laissez-faire work environments. He is often confused with McGregor with his work environments, but McGregor adapted them directly to leadership-theory. Authoritarian environments are characterized where the leader determines policy with techniques and steps for work tasks dictated by the leader in the division of labor. The leader is not necessarily hostile but is aloof from participation in work and commonly offers personal praise and criticism for the work done. Democratic climates are characterized where policy is determined through collective processes with decisions assisted by the leader. Before accomplishing tasks, perspectives are gained from group discussion and technical advice from a leader. Members are given choices and collectively decide the division of labor. Praise and criticism in such an environment are objective, fact minded and given by a group member without necessarily having participated extensively in the actual work. Laissez-faire environments give freedom to the group for policy determination without any participation from the leader. The leader remains uninvolved in work decisions unless asked, does not participate in the division of labor, and very infrequently gives praise.

=== Change process ===
An early model of change developed by Lewin described change as a three-stage process. The first stage he called "unfreezing". It involved overcoming inertia and dismantling the existing "mind set". It must be part of surviving. Defense mechanisms have to be bypassed. In the second stage the change occurs. This is typically a period of confusion and transition. We are aware that the old ways are being challenged but we do not have a clear picture as to what we are replacing them with yet. The third and final stage he called "refreezing". The new mindset is crystallizing and one's comfort level is returning to previous levels. Lewin's three-step process is regarded as a foundational model for making change in organizations. There is now evidence, however, that Lewin never developed such a model and that it took form after his death in 1947.

==== Sensitivity training ====
While working at MIT in 1946, Lewin received a phone call from the director of the Connecticut State Inter Racial Commission, which requested his help in finding an effective way to combat religious and racial prejudices. He set up a workshop to conduct a "change" experiment, which laid the foundations for what is now known as sensitivity training. In 1947, this led to the establishment of the National Training Laboratories, at Bethel, Maine. Carl Rogers believed that sensitivity training is "perhaps the most significant social invention of this century."

=== Lewin's equation ===
Lewin's equation, B = ƒ(P, E), a psychological equation of behavior developed by Lewin, states that behavior is a function of the person in their environment.

The equation is the psychologist's most well known formula in social psychology, of which Lewin was a modern pioneer. When first presented in Lewin's book Principles of Topological Psychology, published in 1936, it contradicted most popular theories in that it gave importance to a person's momentary situation in understanding his or her behavior, rather than relying entirely on the past.

=== Group dynamics ===
In a 1947 article, Lewin coined the term "group dynamics". He described this notion as the way that groups and individuals act and react to changing circumstances. This field emerged as a concept dedicated to the advancement of knowledge regarding the nature of groups, their laws, establishment, development, and interactions with other groups, individuals and institutions. During the early years of research on group processes, many psychologists rejected the reality of group phenomena. Critics shared the opinion that groups did not exist as scientifically valid entities. It had been said by skeptics that the actions of groups were nothing more than those of its members considered separately. Lewin applied his interactionism formula, B = ƒ(P, E), to explain group phenomena, where a member's personal characteristics (P) interact with the environmental factors of the group, (E) its members, and the situation to elicit behaviour (B). Given his background in Gestalt psychology, Lewin justified group existence using the dictum "The whole is greater than the sum of its parts". He theorized that when a group is established it becomes a unified system with supervening qualities that cannot be understood by evaluating members individually. This notion – that a group is composed of more than the sum of its individual members – quickly gained support from sociologists and psychologists who understood the significance of this emerging field. Many pioneers noted that the majority of group phenomena could be explained according to Lewin's equation and insight and opposing views were hushed. The study of group dynamics remains relevant in today's society where a vast number of professions (e.g., business and industry, clinical/counseling psychology, sports and recreation) rely on its mechanisms to thrive.

The most notable of Lewin's contributions was his development of group communication and group dynamics as major facets of the communication discipline. Lewin and his associated researchers shifted from the pre-existing trend of individualist psychology and then expanded their work to incorporate a macro lens where they focused on the "social psychology of small group communication" (Rogers 1994). Lewin is associated with "founding research and training in group dynamics and for establishing the participative management style in organizations". He carved out this niche for himself from his various experiments. In his Berlin research, Lewin utilized "group discussions to advance his theory in research." In doing so, there was certainly the complication of not knowing exactly whom to attribute epiphanies to as an idea collectively came into fruition. In addition to group discussions, he became increasingly interested in group membership. He was curious as to how perspectives of an individual in relation to the group were solidified or weakened. He tried to come up with the way identity was constructed from standpoint and perspectives. These were the beginnings of what ended up developing into "groupthink". Lewin started to become quite interested in how ideas were created and then perpetuated by the mentality of a group. Not included in this chapter is how important this became in looking at group dynamics across disciplines – including studying John F Kennedy and the way he tried to interact with his advisors in order to prevent groupthink from occurring.

=== Peach and coconuts ===
Lewin conceived the Peach v Coconut cultural distinction. Peach cultures included India, the U.S., most of Latin America, and Southern Europe. Peaches tend to be soft and friendly on the surface, even with strangers, but have a hard protective inner core. Coconut cultures include China, Russia and most of Europe except the south. Folk from coconut cultures have a soft inner core, but a tough exterior than can lead to a perception of unfriendliness with strangers. Yet once a person has gained their trust, they can be loyal friends for life. The Peach v Coconut analogy was later popularised by Fons Trompenaars, who said it "explains all sorts of animosities that bedevil cross-cultural friendships, business dealings and diplomacy."

== Personal life ==
In 1917, Lewin married Maria Landsberg. In 1919, the couple had a daughter Esther Agnes, and in 1922, their son Fritz Reuven was born. They divorced around 1927, and Maria immigrated to Mandatory Palestine with the children. In 1929, Lewin married Gertrud Weiss. Their daughter Miriam was born in 1931, and their son Daniel was born in 1933.

== Death ==
In 1947, Lewin died of heart failure in Newtonville, Massachusetts, and was interred in Mount Auburn Cemetery in Cambridge, Massachusetts. His wife died in 1987.

== Major publications ==
- Lewin, K. (1935). A dynamic theory of personality. New York: McGraw-Hill.
- Lewin, K. (1936). Principles of topological psychology. New York: McGraw-Hill.
- Lewin, K. (1938). The conceptual representation and measurement of psychological forces. Durham, NC: Duke University Press.
- Lewin, K., and Gertrude W. Lewin (Ed.) (1948). Resolving social conflicts: selected papers on group dynamics (1935–1946). New York: Harper and Brothers.
- Lewin, K., and Dorwin Cartwright (Ed.) (1951). Field theory in social science. New York: Harper.
- Lewin, K., (1950s?). Self-hatred among Jews : Identifying with the Jewish group. Johannesburg : Information Department of the South African Federation of Student Jewish and Zionist Associations.
- Lewin, K. (1997). Resolving social conflicts & Field theory in social science. Washington, D.C.: American Psychological Association.
- Lewin, K., and Martin Gold (Ed.). (1999). The complete social scientist: a Kurt Lewin reader. Washington, DC: American Psychological Association.
- Lewin, K., (1980). Kurt Lewin Werkausgabe in German (Kurt Lewin Collected Works) Ed. Karl Friedrich Graumann, Stuttgart, Klett; 4 Issues, contains several works, which were published from the estate or never translated into English
- Lewin, K. (2009). Kurt Lewin Schriften zur angewandten Psychologie. Aufsätze, Vorträge, Rezensionen in German, Ed. Helmut E. Lück, Vienna, Verlag Wolfgang Krammer, ISBN 978-3-901811-46-3; contains several unpublished articles

== See also ==
- Berlin school of experimental psychology
- Approach-avoidance conflict
- Ecological systems theory
- Macy conferences
- Maintenance actions
- Decision field theory
- Valence (psychology)
