= Organization =

Social entity established to meet needs or pursue goals

Structure of the United Nations organization

An organization or organisation (Commonwealth English; see spelling differences) is an entity—such as a company, or corporation or an institution (formal organization), or an association—comprising one or more people and having a particular purpose. Organizations may also operate secretly in the case of secret societies or illegally in the case of criminal organizations, or both secretly and illegally in the case of many resistance movements.

What makes an organization recognized by the government is either filling out incorporation or recognition in the form of either societal pressure (e.g.: Advocacy group), causing concerns (e.g.: Resistance movement) or being considered the spokesperson of a group of people subject to negotiation (e.g.: the Polisario Front being recognized as the sole representative of the Sahrawi people and forming a partially recognized state). Compare the concept of social groups, which may include non-organizations.

Organizations and institutions can be synonymous, while Jack Knight writes that organizations are a narrow version of institutions or represent a cluster of institutions; the two are distinct in the sense that organizations contain internal institutions (that govern interactions between the members of the organizations).

The word in English is derived from the French organisation, which itself is derived from the medieval Latin organizationem and its root organum was borrowed whole from the Greek word organon, which means tool or instrument, musical instrument, and organ.

== Types ==
There are a variety of legal types of organizations, including corporations, governments, non-governmental organizations, political organizations, international organizations, religious organizations, armed forces, charities, not-for-profit corporations, partnerships, cooperatives, and educational institutions, etc.

A hybrid organization is a body that operates in both the public sector and the private sector simultaneously, fulfilling public duties and developing commercial market activities.

A voluntary association is an organization consisting of volunteers. Such organizations may be able to operate without legal formalities, depending on jurisdiction, including informal clubs or coordinating bodies with a goal in mind which they may express in the form of a manifesto, mission statement, or implicitly through the organization's actions.

== Structures ==
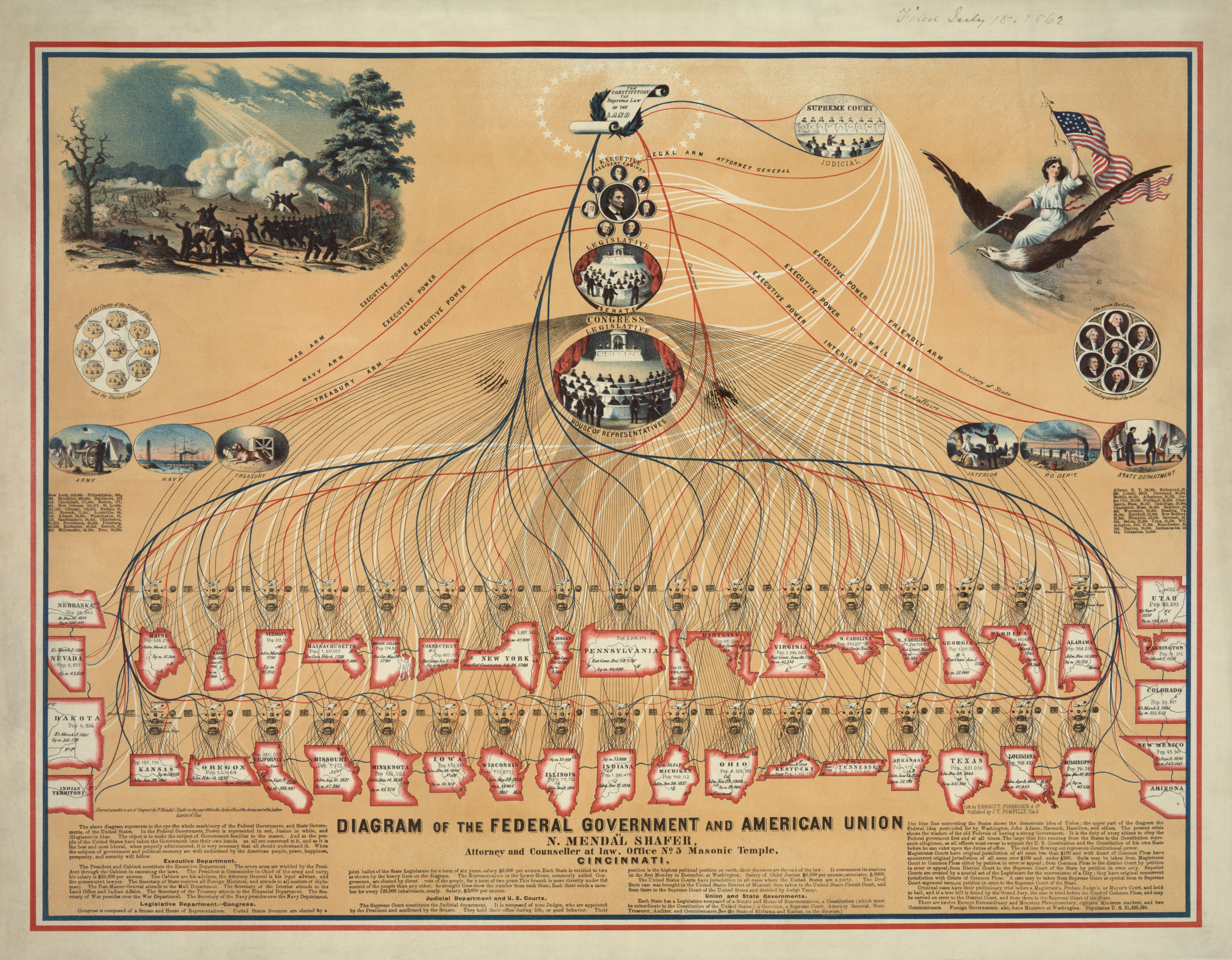
Diagram of the Federal Government and American Union, 1862

The study of organizations includes a focus on optimizing organizational structure. According to management science, most human organizations fall roughly into four types:

- Committees or juries
- Ecologies
- Matrix organizations
- Pyramids or hierarchies

=== Committees or juries ===
These consist of a group of peers who decide as a group, perhaps by voting. The difference between a jury and a committee is that the members of the committee are usually assigned to perform or lead further actions after the group comes to a decision, whereas members of a jury come to a decision. In common law countries, legal juries render decisions of guilt, liability, and quantify damages; juries are also used in athletic contests, book awards, and similar activities. Sometimes a selection committee functions like a jury. In the Middle Ages, juries in continental Europe were used to determine the law according to consensus among local notables.

Committees are often the most reliable way to make decisions. Condorcet's jury theorem proved that if the average member votes better than a roll of dice, then adding more members increases the number of majorities that can come to a correct vote (however correctness is defined). The problem is that if the average member is subsequently worse than a roll of dice, the committee's decisions grow worse, not better; therefore, staffing is crucial.

Parliamentary procedure, such as Robert's Rules of Order, helps prevent committees from engaging in lengthy discussions without reaching decisions.

=== Ecologies ===
This organizational structure promotes internal competition. Inefficient components of the organization starve, while effective ones get more work. Everybody is paid for what they actually do, and so runs a tiny business that has to show a profit, or they are fired.

Companies that utilize this organization type reflect a rather one-sided view of what goes on in ecology. It is also the case that a natural ecosystem has a natural border – ecoregions do not, in general, compete with one another in any way, but are very autonomous.

The pharmaceutical company GlaxoSmithKline talks about functioning as this type of organization in this external article from The Guardian. By:Bastian Batac De Leon.

=== Matrix organization ===
This organizational type assigns each worker two bosses in two different hierarchies. One hierarchy is "functional" and ensures that each type of expert in the organization is well-trained, and evaluated by a boss who is a super-expert in the same field. The other hierarchy is "executive" and focuses on getting projects completed using the experts. Projects might be organized by products, regions, customer types, or other schemes.

As an example, a company might have an individual with overall responsibility for products X and Y, and another individual with overall responsibility for engineering, quality control, etc. Therefore, subordinates responsible for quality control of project X will have two reporting lines. The United States aerospace industries were the first to officially use this organizational structure after it emerged in the early 1960s.

=== Pyramids or hierarchical ===
A hierarchy exemplifies an arrangement with a leader who leads other individual members of the organization. This arrangement is often associated with the basis that there are enough to imagine a real pyramid, if there are not enough stone blocks to hold up the higher ones, gravity would irrevocably bring down the monumental structure. So one can imagine that if the leader does not have the support of his subordinates, the entire structure will collapse. Hierarchies were satirized in The Peter Principle (1969), a book that introduced hierarchiology and the saying that "in a hierarchy, every employee tends to rise to his level of incompetence."

== Theories ==
In the social sciences, organizations are the object of analysis for a number of disciplines, such as sociology, economics, political science, psychology, management, and organizational communication. The broader analysis of organizations is commonly referred to as organizational structure, organizational studies, organizational behavior, or organization analysis. A number of different perspectives exist, some of which are compatible:

- From a functional perspective, the focus is on how entities like businesses or state authorities are used.
- From an institutional perspective, an organization is viewed as a purposeful structure within a social context.
- From a process-related perspective, an organization is viewed as an entity being (re-)organized, and the focus is on the organization as a set of tasks or actions.

Sociology can be defined as the science of the institutions of modernity; specific institutions serve a function, akin to the individual organs of a coherent body. In the social and political sciences in general, an "organization" may be more loosely understood as the planned, coordinated, and purposeful action of human beings working through collective action to reach a common goal or construct a tangible product. This action is usually framed by formal membership and form (institutional rules). Sociology distinguishes the term organization into planned formal and unplanned informal (i.e. spontaneously formed) organizations. Sociology analyzes organizations in the first line from an institutional perspective. In this sense, the organization is an enduring arrangement of elements. These elements and their actions are determined by rules so that a certain task can be fulfilled through a system of coordinated division of labor.

Economic approaches to organizations also take the division of labor as a starting point. The division of labor allows for (economies of) specialization. Increasing specialization necessitates coordination. From an economic point of view, markets and organizations are alternative coordination mechanisms for the execution of transactions.

An organization is defined by the elements that are part of it (who belongs to the organization and who does not?), its communication (which elements communicate and how do they communicate?), its autonomy (which changes are executed autonomously by the organization or its elements?), and its rules of action compared to outside events (what causes an organization to act as a collective actor?).

By coordinated and planned cooperation of the elements, the organization is able to solve tasks that lie beyond the abilities of the single element. The price paid by the elements is the limitation of the degrees of freedom of the elements. Advantages of organizations are enhancement (more of the same), addition (combination of different features), and extension. Disadvantages can be inertness (through coordination) and loss of interaction.

Among the theories that are or have been influential are:

- Activity theory is the major theoretical influence, acknowledged by de Clodomir Santos de Morais in the development of Organization Workshop method.
- Actor–network theory, an approach to social theory and research, originating in the field of science studies, which treats objects as part of social networks.
- Complexity theory and organizations, the use of complexity theory in the field of strategic management and organizational studies.
- Contingency theory, a class of behavioral theories that claim that there is no best way to organize a corporation, to lead a company, or to make decisions.
- Critical management studies, a loose but extensive grouping of theoretically informed critiques of management, business, and organization, grounded originally in a critical theory perspective
- Economic sociology, studies both the social effects and the social causes of various economic phenomena.
- Enterprise architecture, the conceptual model that defines the coalescence of organizational structure and organizational behavior.
- Garbage Can Model, describes a model which disconnects problems, solutions, and decision-makers from each other.
- Principal–agent problem, concerns the difficulties in motivating one party (the "agent"), to act in the best interests of another (the "principal") rather than in their own interests
- Scientific management (mainly following Frederick W. Taylor), a theory of management that analyzes and synthesizes workflows.
- Social entrepreneurship, the process of pursuing innovative solutions to social problems.
- Transaction cost theory, the idea that people begin to organize their production in firms when the transaction cost of coordinating production through the market exchange, given imperfect information, is greater than within the firm.
- Weber's Ideal of Bureaucracy (refer to Max Weber's chapter on "Bureaucracy" in his book Economy and Society)

== Leadership ==
A leader in a formal, hierarchical organization, is appointed to a managerial position and has the right to command and enforce obedience by virtue of the authority of his position. However, he must possess adequate personal attributes to match his authority, because authority is only potentially available to him. In the absence of sufficient personal competence, a manager may be confronted by an emergent leader who can challenge his role in the organization and reduce it to that of a figurehead. However, only the authority of position has the backing of formal sanctions. It follows that whoever wields personal influence and power can legitimize this only by gaining a formal position in the hierarchy, with commensurate authority.

=== Formal organizations ===
An organization that is established as a means for achieving defined objectives has been referred to as a formal organization. Its design specifies how goals are subdivided and reflected in subdivisions of the organization. Divisions, departments, sections, positions, jobs, and tasks make up this work structure. Thus, the formal organization is expected to behave impersonally in regard to relationships with clients or with its members. According to Weber's definition, entry and subsequent advancement is by merit or seniority. Each employee receives a salary and enjoys a degree of tenure that safeguards him from the arbitrary influence of superiors or of powerful clients. The higher his position in the hierarchy, the greater his presumed expertise in adjudicating problems that may arise in the course of the work carried out at lower levels of the organization. It is this bureaucratic structure that forms the basis for the appointment of heads or chiefs of administrative subdivisions in the organization and endows them with the authority attached to their position.

=== Informal organizations ===
In contrast to the appointed head or chief of an administrative unit, a leader emerges within the context of the informal organization that underlies the formal structure. The informal organization expresses the personal objectives and goals of the individual membership. Their objectives and goals may or may not coincide with those of the formal organization. The informal organization represents an extension of the social structures that generally characterize human life – the spontaneous emergence of groups and organizations as ends in themselves.

In prehistoric times, man was preoccupied with his personal security, maintenance, protection, and survival. Today, man spends a major portion of his waking hours working for organizations. His need to identify with a community that provides security, protection, maintenance, and a sense of belonging remains unchanged from prehistoric times. This need is met by the informal organization and its emergent, or unofficial, leaders.

Leaders emerge from within the structure of the informal organization. Their personal qualities, the demands of the situation, or a combination of these and other factors attract followers who accept their leadership within one or several overlay structures. Instead of the authority of position held by an appointed head or chief, the emergent leader wields influence or power. Influence is the ability of a person to gain cooperation from others by means of persuasion or control over rewards. Power is a stronger form of influence because it reflects a person's ability to enforce action through the control of a means of punishment.

=== The interplay between formal and informal organizations ===
As most organizations operate through a mix of formal and informal mechanisms, organization science scholars have paid attention to the type of interplay between formal and informal organizations. On the one hand, some have argued that formal and informal organizations operate as substitutes as one type of organization would decrease the advantages of using the other one. For instance, if parties trust each other the use of a formal contract is unnecessary or even detrimental to the relationship. On the other hand, other scholars have suggested that formal and informal organizations can complement each other. For instance, formal mechanisms of control can pave the way for the development of relational norms.

== See also ==
- Affinity group – Social grouping formed around a shared interest or goal
- Anticipatory socialization – Process in which people take on the values of groups that they aspire to join
- Business organization – Association or collection of individuals
- Coalition – Group that agrees to work together to achieve a common goal
- Collective – Group of entities sharing interest
- Decentralized autonomous organization – Type of organization run via blockchain
- History of organizations
- List of designated terrorist organizations
- List of environmental organizations
- List of general fraternities
- List of international professional associations
- List of trade unions
- Maturity model
- Multidimensional organization – Organization that works simultaneously in multiple dimensions
- Mutual organization – Organization based on mutual benefit
- Organization Workshop
- Organizational psychology
- Pacifist organization
- Requisite organization
- Service club – Type of voluntary nonprofit organization
- Size of groups, organizations, and communities
- Umbrella organization – Group of industry-specific institutions
- Voluntary association – Group of people with shared interests or aims
