= Clodomir Santos de Morais =

Brazilian sociologist (1928–2016)

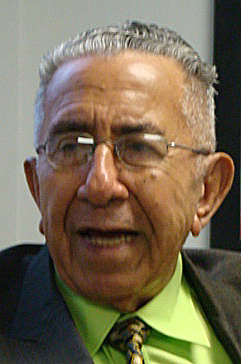
- de Morais in Costa Rica in November 2008
- Born: 30 September 1928; Santa Maria da Vitória, Bahía State, Brazil
- Died: 25 March 2016 (aged 87); Santa Maria da Vitória, Bahía State, Brazil
- Known for: The Organization Workshop (OW)/Large Group Capacitation Method (LGCM)
- Awards: Professor Doctor Honoris Causa UNIR; Human Rights Prize (2008 – Brazil)

Clodomir Santos de Morais (30 September 1928 – 25 March 2016) was a Brazilian sociologist who originated the Organization Workshop (OW) and the associated Activity-based Large Group Capacitation Method (LGCM).

In the 1940s and 1950s de Morais worked as a trade unionist and a journalist, becoming a member of the Pernambuco State Assembly and co-founder of the Ligas Camponêsas (Peasant Leagues). After the 1964 coup he was forced into exile, first in Chile, and, as ILO Regional Advisor on Agrarian Reform for Central America, he subsequently worked as Agrarian Reform consultant in Latin America, Portugal and Africa.

After the end of military rule de Morais returned to Brazil in 1988, answering a call from the University of Brasilia to help in the 'hidden civil war' of unemployment.

He recently returned to his hometown in Bahía State.

== Pre-exile: Bahía, São Paulo, Pernambuco ==
De Morais (occasionally spelled Moraes) was born in Santa Maria da Vitória, Bahía State, Brazil. After elementary school and a short apprenticeship as a tailor there, he moved, barely 15, to São Paulo where to pay for his studies, he played the saxofone in a jazz band and clarinet in a symphonic orchestra, before becoming a conveyor belt operator at the São Paulo Ford plant making it to line supervisor after two years. While finishing his Secondary he also worked as a part-time journalist. It was while working at Ford that he became involved in trade unionism and political activism along with the painter Luis Enjorras Ventura, the educator Dario Lorenzo, the art critic Radha Abramo as well as the sociologist Fernando Henrique Cardoso (FHC), who later was to become president of the Republic.

In 1950, aged 22, he moved to the Bahía State capital Salvador where he founded the weekly "Critica", the only opposition paper to the then governor Régis Pacheco. In 1951 he moved to Recife where, while studying law at the Federal University of Pernambuco, he worked as an Associated Press reporter on several local dailies such as the Jornal do Comercio and for Radio Clube and Radio Olinda. Together with Francisco Julião, who became their president, he was co-founder of the Nordeste Peasant League movement in Pernambuco. The insights which gave rise to what was eventually to become the Organization Workshop were the unanticipated outcome of a clandestine meeting held by a large group of Peasant League middle managers in an ordinary townhouse, in Recife in 1954, to study Brazilian Agrarian Law, and which Clodomir de Morais attended. An evaluation conducted six months after that meeting found that participants had made remarkable contributions to their home communities, in some cases in marked contrast to previous behavior. Rather than improved knowledge of agrarian law (most of which had been forgotten), they had developed strong organizational skills. de Morais attributed this unexpected outcome to the fact that "the cramped conditions of the house, combined with the need for secrecy so as not to arouse the suspicion of the police, ... had imposed on the group a strict organizational discipline in terms of division and synchronization of all the tasks needed for such an event". This insight led Moraes to think about practical exercises where a shared resource base, activity, and the need for analytical thought would stimulate organizational consciousness. From the early 1960s onwards de Morais staged workshops of an experimental character among the Pernambuco Peasant Leagues.

In 1955 de Morais was elected delegate to the Pernambuco Federal Assembly where he was instrumental in getting approval for the creation of the Pernambucan Development Bank. about which he quipped "I am hopeless with money, yet am responsible for one of the big banks in the country". The military coup d'état of 1 April 1964 overthrew the João Goulart government. Left-wing politicians and activists were arrested. Paulo Freire recounts that de Morais had already been imprisoned and tortured – he, and his then wife – well before the coup (1962), "by the Police of Carlos Lacerda, in Rio de Janeiro", "because of his political activities" which meant that, including 1964 post-Coup, he spent "a total of two years in prison". Paulo Freire himself was arrested at the time of the coup and spent some time with his friend de Morais in the same tiny cell in the Olinda prison. Among the many incriminating counts the Military held against de Morais (he ranked an honorary 12th on the Junta's list of the 100 troublemakers who had their civil rights suspended for 10 years) were his and the Peasant League's Cuban sympathies, e.g. the hospitality he gave in his house, in 1961, to a visiting Cuban Central Committee member. During his captivity Clodomir, always a raconteur, wrote a series of stories from "deep Brazil". At a much later stage in life, de Morais would reminisce about those days of liberating struggle. de Morais was forced into exile for 15 years and was granted asylum at the Chilean Embassy in Rio de Janeiro.

== 1964–1988: Years of Exile and Spread of the Organization Workshop ==
While in Chile, Clodomir specialized in cultural anthropology at University of Chile, and in Agrarian Reform at the Agrarian Reform Capacitation and Research Institute (ICIRA), after which he was appointed ILO Regional Advisor on Agrarian Reform for Central America. In 1968, as consultant for the National Agrarian Institute (INA) of Honduras, he set up a "Centre" OW at the Guanchias Cooperative in the course of which the construction of the Centre itself became an integral part of that OW. The "Centre" OW – (and, later on, the "Course" and "Enterprise" OW) – was a variation on the main "Field" OW theme. The latter is always open to local large group participation, "regardless of age, sex, color, religion or whatever", and lasts one month. The former, which may last three months or more, has participants, OW fashion, entirely in charge of internal organization and management, and is structured around the formation of cadres and (future) OW Directors and Assistants (known as APIs). The inspiration for these "boarding" type OWs came from a CEPAL-led course for international economic development experts which Clodomir attended during his studies in Santiago (Chile) in 1965. It was to Guanchias that development and agrarian reform agencies would send their recruits for initiation into the OW.

In 1969 he directed a large "Centre" OW in Panama in the context of Omar Torrijos' Mil Jovenes (Thousand Youths) Operation which sent out 1,000 young Panamanians to reproduce the OW in support of the government's agrarian reform. 280 new enterprises resulted, grouped under the Panamanian CONAC (National Confederation of Campesino Land Settlements) which subsequently organized other OW learning events nationally. In 1970 (until 1973) de Morais, on account of the ILO, moved to Costa Rica where a new Land Settlement Policy had just come in operation. His conferences at the University of Costa Rica and the Universidad Nacional aroused a keen interest. At the behest of T. Quirós, president of the Institute for Lands and Colonization (ITCO), an ILO-funded Centre OW was arranged in Bataán. The new cadres and OW directors formed there were responsible, in 1973 alone, for 80 new pre-cooperative groups and 15 new enterprises. Barrantes' 1998 book Coopesilencio: 25 years on traces the story of one of the many long-term surviving cooperative enterprises hailing back to those groundbreaking years.

After having spent some time as visiting scholar at the University of Wisconsin, US, de Morais was again in Honduras from 1973 until 1976 as FAO consultant in charge of the PROCCARA Program (Campesino Capacitation Program for Agrarian Reform), which was to become the blueprint for the "Honduran Model", the application of the OW on a countrywide basis. in which 27,000 Hondurans and other nationals, mainly campesinos but also students and public sector workers, participated in more than 200 OWs. This led to the creation of 1,053 new enterprises, some of the bigger ones, such as the palm oil growing and processing plants Hondupalma, Salama and Coapalma still operating today.

When his Honduras contract came to an end in 1976, de Morais, at the invitation of the Centre for Ecology and Sustainable Development (CECODES) took charge of the FAO/UNDP-funded (Mex74/006) Integrated Rural Development Program for Humid Tropics (PRODERITH) project in Mexico in 1977–78. PRODERITH ran various OWs in San Luis Potosí, Chiapas and Tabasco. In 1985 de Morais, then visiting professor in East Germany, returned to Mexico for the official signing of a new tranche of World Bank funding for PRODERITH projects. This was the start of a long OW presence in Mexico, from the "Enterprise" OW with the Huatusco, Veracruz coffee growers in the 90s, the Tabasco OWs in the noughties up to the recent Mexico City OW-based large scale "¡Que Buena Puntada!" sewing cooperatives led by Verónica Viloria in 2007–2012 Mexico City.

In Portugal, the Carnation Revolution and the subsequent 1976 free elections had brought the Salazar/Caetano corporatist regime in Portugal to an end. The new Soares government set up INSCOOP, or the 'Antonio Sergio Institute for the Cooperative Sector', tasked with instilling organizational and management skills in the proliferation of 3,800-plus post-revolution cooperative enterprises. de Morais, then in Mexico, was asked to take charge, as ILO consultant, of the ILO/SIDA/UNDP-funded Cooperative Development POR/ILO/UNDP/007 Project. In 1979 de Morais ran a "Course" OW lasting 5 months for a group 50 Portuguese TDE (Economic Development Expert) candidates with higher levels of education, with an additional ten candidates from Africa, Guatemala and Brazil (de Morais was still banned in his home country). These TDEs were to become the backbone of the first European national SIPGEI (Social Participation System for the Identification of Job and Income Generation Projects). Eventually a "6,000-strong army of experts at grassroots, middle and higher-ranking levels, who had graduated from the massive capacitation programs realized by INSCOOP", would be formed. Correia notes that it was by means of this capacitation program that the ground was prepared for Portugal's imminent entry into the European Community.

Shortly after the Portugal assignment came Clodomir's transfer to Nicaragua at the behest of the new Sandinista government, which had requested him to set up a 'SIPGER' (Job Creation System), identical to the national PROCCARA project he previously had run in Honduras, in this case on account of the Nicaraguan ILO/INRA-sponsored COPERA (Capacitation Project for the Organization of Producers and Job Creation) Program. de Morais ran some initial pilot OWs in Nicaragua until, in December 1980, the Sandinista government caught cold feet about going national.

The further spread of the OW in the 1980s was due partly to de Morais visiting other Latin American countries where he gave talks and lectures and attended seminars at a number of universities, but mainly due to the fact that Honduras in general and the Honduran Guanchias center in particular had become a magnet for field and middle management personnel and members of the campesino membership enterprises from other Latin American countries as well as from the Caribbean. They were sponsored to participate in the Honduran workshops by the Inter-American Institute for Cooperation in Agriculture (IICA) and by the Foundation for Applied Capacitation and Research in Agrarian Reform (CIARA). Those participants "reproduced the same type of experiments in Panama, Costa Rica, Venezuela, Mexico, Brazil, Haiti, the Dominican Republic, Colombia, Guatemala, Nicaragua, Dominica and Belize. In several of them, the Netherlands' Hivos and the Honduran Institute for Rural Development (IDHER) played a very important role". Thus, for example, from 1979 onwards, one hundred OWs were organized in Colombia, resulting in 400 job-generating enterprises. Sobrado points out that "the example, the Honduran Oscar Leiva and the Chilean Iván Labra", together with de Morais himself, pioneered the OW in Venezuela. Subsequent to the 1980 CIARA-sponsored Conference on the OW in Caracas, 96 new OW Directors organized 286 workshops in which 11,440 Venezuelans participated.

In 1984 and 1985 de Morais was active in Geneva (Switzerland), Africa and Germany: The ILO had asked him to set up a Course series in Geneva for key African trade union and government personnel about to fill the many posts left vacant by the departed colonial powers. However, before the course could be started up, many had already been called back by their governments and given important positions. This left de Morais with no option but to go to Africa himself: he ran 'in situ' course OWs successively in Guinea Bissau, Angola, Mozambique and São Tomé and Príncipe.

In 1986, Ian Cherrett, then Hivos representative for southern Africa, and Cephas Muropa, with the support of Glen Forest Training Centre (Harare, Zim.) ran the very first OW in anglophone southern Africa at the Rujeko Cooperative Makoni Makoni District (Zim.). Not without considerable difficulties, however. That was the moment when Hivos, through Cherrett, invited the Social Psychologists Isabel and Iván Labra, with long, hands-on experience of running workshops in Latin America, to come to Zimbabwe. The magazine "Workteam" spread further knowledge about the OW to a wider English-speaking public in Africa. Workteam subsequently reported on workshops which took place in Botswana (with the support of CORDE), Zimbabwe, South Africa, Namibia and the Caribbean.

de Morais became visiting professor at the Humboldt University of Berlin in 1986, and at the University of Rostock (GDR) where he was awarded a doctorate in sociology in 1987.

== 1988: Back in Brazil ==
Civilian rule was restored in Brazil with the coming to power of president José Sarney, but Brazil had to wait until 1989 for the first democratic elections since the 1964 coup. In 1988 Cristovam Buarque, then Vice Chancellor of the University of Brasilia, invited Clodomir, then still in Rostock, to Brasilia to set up the Institute for Technical Support to Third World Countries (IATTERMUND) to tackle one of the country's gravest problems, the 'hidden civil war of unemployment'. The first request for OWs in Brazil came from the 30 self-managing Landless Workers' Movement (MST) cooperatives which subsequently changed their slogan from "Invade! Occupy!" to "Invade! Occupy! Produce!". Soon to follow the MST lead was the POLONOROESTE project, jointly funded by the Brazilian Ministry of National Integration, FAO and World Bank.

The Supervisory Development Authority for Amazônia (SUDAM) (1996–2002) reports that, with IATTERMUND's 'APRENDER-FAZENDO' (Learn by doing) methodology, the POLONOROESTE program in 1992–3 ran OWs in São Paulo, Paraíba and Alagoas. It ran a pilot project in 1996 in Tocantins followed by a full program of 59 Field OWs, two Course OWs and one Course for future OW Directors in Pará, Amapá, Amazonia, Acre and in the Municipality of Belém in which 20,059 persons participated, resulting in 696 new Enterprises yielding 5,596 new jobs. Correia estimates that, based on IATTERMUND and different state, municipality, as well as MST sources which she researched, in the decade from 1988 to 1998, "around 100,000 people participated in various OW events in Brazil". From 1996 to 1998 22,000 people participated in 'PAE' (Self Employment Program – under the banner "More than a job: a Future") in the heavily urbanized state of São Paulo resulting in 711 new enterprises, including People's Banks ("Bancos do Povo") The OW reached its apogee when, in 2000-2 alone, under the national 'PRONAGER', 110,946 people participated in 282 OWs. In many of these, especially Centre and Course OW-type of events, de Morais himself was always personally involved as coordinator and/or Course Director. He did not limit himself to Brazil and personally directed the 3-month (September–December 2000) national PRONACAMPO Course OW for around 1,000 Guatemalan OW technicians, directors and assistants in Guatemala City.

After the Workers' Party/PT electoral victory in 2003, large regional and national-scale OW 'PRONAGER' programs such as those that took place under the previous Fernando Henrique Cardoso's Brazilian Social Democracy Party dwindled both in size and in number. From then on, OWs in Brazil continued to be run on a more local(ized) basis, such as the Rondonia OWs in 2002. From September 2012 to January 2013 de Morais directed the Guajará Mirim Course OW.

In the meantime region-wide OW programs and government-sponsored OW events have taken on a life on their own, especially in the last decade, in Costa Rica and South Africa.

de Morais was a visiting professor at the University of Brasilia (1988), the Federal University of Rondônia/UNIR (Amazonia)(2003–09), the Chapingo Autonomous University (Mexico) (2000–2002) and the Autonomous University of Honduras (2006–08).

In 2013 he returned to his hometown in Bahía State, where he died on 25 March 2016.

== See also ==
- Action learning
- Aleksei N. Leontiev
- Community Development
- Cultural-Historical Activity Theory (CHAT)
- Cultural-historical psychology
- Experiential learning
- FAO
- ILO
- Global South
- Large-group capacitation
- Organization Workshop
- Paulo Freire
- Peasant leagues (Brazil)
- Situated learning
- Training
- Professional Development
- UNDP
- Lev Vygotsky
- Zone of Proximal Development

== Bibliography ==
- Andersson, Gavin (2004). Unbounded Governance: A Study of Popular Development Organization. UK: Open University.
- Andersson, Gavin (2010). KWANDA. An example of Civic Driven Change? (PDF). South Africa: Seriti Institute. Archived from the original (PDF) on 5 November 2013.
- Andersson, Gavin (2013a). The Activity Theory Approach (PDF). Seriti, S.A.: (pre-booklaunch) chapter from Unbounded Organization:Embracing Societal Enterprise. Archived from the original (PDF) on 5 November 2013.
- Andersson, Gavin (2013b). "Introduction to the Theory of Organisation of Clodomir Santos de Morais". Isandla Institute - excerpt from Unbounded Organization: Embracing the Societal Enterprise. Archived from the original on 2 January 2014.
- Andersson, Gavin; Richards, Howard (2015). Unbounded Organizing in Community. World Dignity University Press. ISBN 9781937570606.
- Araújo, Sebastão Lopes (2009). A Metodologia da Capacitação Massiva como Instrumento de inclusão social: Estudo de caso – The Large Group Capacitation Methodology as an Instrument of social inclusion: a case study (PDF) (in Portuguese). Fortaleza, Ceará State, Brazil: Ceará State University, Br. Archived from the original (PDF) on 5 November 2013.
- Barrantes, Victor, J. (1998). La construcción de un sueño: Coopesilencio, 25 años después – The construction of a dream: Coopesilencio 25 years on. Costa Rica: EUNA. ISBN 9789977651415.
- Carmen, R; Labra, I.&I.; Davis, M. (1999). Learning from Brazil. Proceedings of the Manchester Conference of 23rd March 1998 & the Synchronous & Asynchrononous online virtual conferencing. Manchester University UK: Manchester Monographs #38. ISBN 9780902252295.
- Carmen, Raff; Sobrado, Miguel (2000). A Future for the Excluded. London, UK: Zed Books. ISBN 9781856497022.
- Carmen, Raff; Sobrado, Miguel (2002a). Un Futuro para los Excluidos - A Future for the Excluded (in Spanish). Heredia, Costa Rica: EUNA. ISBN 9977-65-230-9.
- Carmen, Raff; Sobrado, Miguel (2002b). Um Futuro para os Excluidos - A Future for the Excluded (in Portuguese). Porto Velho, Amazonia, Br.: IATTERMUND.
- Cavalcanti, Paulo (1980). O caso eu conto, como o caso foi – Just in case I tell the story as it really was Vol. 2. Recife, Brazil: Editora Guararapes.
- CeCAC, Centro Cultural Antonio Carlos de Carvalho (2005). A Reforma Agraria no Brasil e na America Latina –Agrarian Reform in Brazil and Latin America (in Portuguese). Rio de Janeiro Brazil: CeCAC. Archived from the original on 27 November 2010.
- Cintra, Benito Eliseu Leite (1998). Paulo Freire entre o grego e o semita: educação: filosofia e comunhão – Paulo Freire between Greek and Semite: education, philosophy and communion. Porto Alegre, Br: ediPURCS. ISBN 9788574300153.
- Correia, Jainta JB (1994). Comunicação e Capacitação – Communication and Capacitation (in Portuguese). Brasilia, Br: IATTERMUND.
- Correia, Jacinta CB (2001). Comunicación y Capacitación en Empresas Autogestionarias surgidas de Laboratorios Organizacionales – Communication and Capacitation in the Selfmanaging Enterprises resulting from Organization Workshops (in Spanish). Mexico: PhD Thesis Chapingo University.
- Correia, Jacinta CB (2007). Learning with Africa: the Case of Mozambique (PDF). Goa (India): Presentation made in Jan 2006 at the 'African Diaspora in India 'TADIA' meeting. Archived from the original (PDF) on 5 November 2013.
- Correia, Jacinta C.B. (2008). Comunicación y autogestion en las cooperativas de reforma agrária ante el Comunicación y autogestion en las cooperativas de reforma agrária ante el desafio del relevo generacional – Communication and self management in the agrarian reform cooperatives faced with the challenge of the new generational take-over (PDF) (in Spanish). Tegucigalpa, Hond: UNAH National Autonomous University Honduras.
- Erazo, Benjamin; Fajardo, Allan (1980). El Proceso de Colectivización del Agro Hondureño – The collectivisation process of Honduran agriculture (in Spanish). Mexico: Centro de Estudios Superiores Tercer Milenio – CESTEM no 1.
- Freire, Paulo; Guimarães, Sérgio (1987). Aprendendo com a própia história – Learning with one's own History (in Portuguese). Rio de Janeiro, Br.: Paz e Terra.
- IICA, Instituto Interamericano de Ciencias Agricolas (1977). Seminario de Analisis y Evaluación de Laboratorios Experimentales – Experimental Workshops Analysis and Evaluation Seminar (in Spanish). San José, Costa Rica: PRACCA Training and Study Program on Agrarian Reform and Rural Development in the Central American Isthmus.
- IICA, Instituto Interamericano de Ciencias Agricolas (1979). Laboratorio Experimental de Capacitación en Organización – Experimental Workshop on Organizational Capacitation (in Spanish). Bogotá, Colombia: SENA Servicio Nacional de Aprendizaje.
- INA, Instituto Nacional Agrario-National Agrarian Institute (1974). Programa de Capacitación Campesina para la Reforma Agraria – Campesino Capacitation Program for Agrarian Reform. Tegucigalpa, Honduras: Government Printer. OCLC 24518003.
- José, Emiliano (2005). Boletim do Deputado Emiliano – Newssheet of the Deputy Emiliano (in Portuguese). Bahía, Br.: Boletim No 91 May. Archived from the original on 11 October 2013.
- Labra, Iván (1992). Psicología Social: Responsabilidad y Necesidad – Social Psychology. Responsibility and Need (in Spanish). LOM Ediciones, Chile. ISBN 9567369526.
- Labra, Isabel; Labra, Ivan (2012). The Organization Workshop Method (PDF). Seriti, S.A.: Integra Terra Network Editor. Archived from the original (PDF) on 5 November 2013.
- Labra, Iván (2014). A Critique of the Social Psychology of Small Groups & an Introduction to a Social Psychology of the Large Group (PDF). IntegraTerra – Chile: (pre-booklaunch) Chapter I. Archived from the original (PDF) on 5 August 2017.
- Morais, Clodomir (1950). O Amor e a Sociedade – Love and Society – Collection of Poems (in Portuguese). Rio de Janeiro, Br.: Helius – São Paulo Academy of Letters.
- Moraes, Clodomir -"Peasant Leagues in Brazil" in: Stavenhagen, Rodolfo (1970). Agrarian Problems and Peasant Movements in Latin America. New York: Anchor. ISBN 0385074999.
- Morais, Clodomir Santos de (1974a). Cinco modelos teóricos de reforma agraria – Five theoretical agrarian reform models (in Spanish). Tegucigalpa, Hond.: INA (National Agrarian Institute). OCLC 656990337.
- Morais, Clodomir Santos de (1974b). Curso intensivo de capacitacion de tecnicos en desarrollo agrario. El modelo hondureno de desarrollo agrario – Intensive capacitation course for rural development technicians. The Honduran Model (in Spanish). Tegucigalpa, Hn.: FAO. Archived from the original on 11 January 2015.
- Morais, Clodomir (1975). The role of the campesino sector in the Honduran agrarian reform. University of Wisconsin USA – Land Tenure: Madison.
- Morais, Clodomir; et al. (1976). El modelo hondureño de desarrollo agrario – The Honduran model of agrarian development (in Spanish). Tegucigalpa, Honduras: National Government Publication. OCLC 4324202.
- Morais, Clodomir, Santos de (1979). Apuntes de teoría de la organización – Notes on theory of Organization (in Spanish). Managua, Nicaragua: PNUD, OIT-NIC/79/010, COPERA Project.
- Morais, Clodomir (1983). Diccionario de reforma agraria : Latinoamérica –Dictionary of Agrarian Reform:Latin America (in Spanish). Ciudad Universitaria Rodrigo Facio, Costa Rica: Editorial Universitaria Centroamericana.
- Morais, Clodomir, Santos de (1987). Objective conditions and subjective factors. PhD Thesis (in Spanish). Rostock GDR. OCLC 75042725.
- Morais, Clodomir, Santos de (1997). História das Ligas Camponesas do Brasil – History of the Peasant Leagues in Brazil (in Portuguese). Brasila, Brazil: IATTERMUND – Instituto de Apoio Técnico aos Países de Terceiro Mundo.
- Morais, Clodomir Santos de (2002a). Já estamos na Camuflada Guerra Civil do Desemprego – We are already engaged in the Hidden Civil War of Unemployment (PDF) (in Portuguese). Porto Velho, Amazonia, Brazil: PRIMEIRA VERSÃO no 67 Edufro.
- Morais, Clodomir Santos de (2002b). Mestre Ambrósio – Master Ambrosio (PDF) (in Portuguese). Porto Velho, Amazonia, Brazil: PRIMEIRA VERSÃO no 89 Edufro.
- Morais, Clodomir Santos de (2002c). Pedro Bunda – Contos Verossímeis – Pedro Bunda – Plausible Stories (PDF) (in Portuguese). Porto Velho, Amazonia, Brazil: PRIMEIRA VERSÃO no 71 Edufro.
- Morais, Clodomir Santos de (2002d). O Ladrão da calça de Casimira– The Thief of Casimira's Pants (PDF) (in Portuguese). Porto Velho, Amazonia, Brazil: PRIMEIRA VERSÃO no 87 Edufro.
- Morais, Clodomir Santos de (2003). Dicionario de reforma agraria America Latina – Dictionary of Agrarian Reform in Latin America (in Portuguese). Porto Velho, Amazonia, Brazil: Universidade Federal de Rondônia. ISBN 9788588436541.
- Morais, Clodomir Santos de (2009). Cenários da libertação: Paulo Freire na prisão, no exílio e na universidade. – Scenes of Liberation: Paulo Freire in prison, in exile and at the University (in Portuguese). Porto Velho, Amazonia: Editora da Universidade Federal de Rondônia.
- Nacif, Vera (1998). Programa Nacional de Generación de Empleo y de Renta PRONAGER – National Job and Income Generation Program PRONAGER (PDF) (in Spanish). Brasilia: Government Brazil Dpt of Culture. pp. 29–35. Archived from the original (PDF) on 23 October 2013.
- Neto, Joaquim Lisboa (23 April 2012). CLODOMIR MORAIS: Uma Trajetória de Luta em Favor dos Excluídos – Clodomir Morais – a Path in the Struggle in Defense of the Excluded (in Portuguese). Recife, Pernambuco, Brazil: Jornal Comércio Hoje. Archived from the original on 25 May 2014.
- Salinas, M.; Oswald, U., eds. (2002). Culturas de Paz, seguridad y democracia en America Latina – Cultures of Peace, Security and Democracy in Latin America (in Spanish). Mexico D.F., Mex: CRIM-UNAM Fundación Boll. ISBN 9789703202003.
- Silveira, Caio, M.; et al. (1997). Metodologias de Capacitação – Cefe, Gespar, Capacitação Massiva – Methods of Capacitatio – Cefe, Gespar, Large Group Capacitation Method (in Portuguese). Rio de Janeiro: FASE. Archived from the original on 11 January 2015.
- Sobrado, Miguel; Rojas, Juan José Herrera (2006). EUNA (ed.). America Latina: crisis del Estado clientelista y la construcción de repúblicas ciudadanas – Latin America: crisis of the clientelist state and building the citizen republics (PDF) (in Spanish). Costa Rica. ISBN 9977-65-281-3. Archived from the original (PDF) on 5 November 2013.
- Souza, Abel Sydney de (2006). "A Metodologia da Capacitação Massiva: uma alternative á Geração de emprego e renda – Large Group Capacitation: an alternative approach to Job creation and Income Generation". Revista Espaço Acadêmico (in Portuguese). Portugal: Revista Espaço Acadêmico Nr 57 – ULHT Lusofone University of Humanities and Technology. ISSN 1519-6186. Archived from the original on 23 October 2013.
- Thomaz, Fernanda (2009). A ORGANIZAÇÃO DO TRABALHO CAMPONÊS NA VISÃO DE CLODOMIR SANTOS DE MORAIS – The Organization of rural labor according to Clodomir Santos de Morais (PDF) (in Portuguese). São Paulo, Brazil: XIXth Meeting of the Agrarian Geography group. pp. 1–16.
- Van Dam, C. (1982). EL LABORATORIO EXPERIMENTAL DE C. SANTOS DE MORAIS – UNA PEDAGOGIA PARA LA ORGANIZACIÓN SOCIAL – The Experimental Workshop of C. Santos de Morais – a pedagogy for social organization (PDF) (in Spanish). The Hague Netherlands: CESO. Archived from the original (PDF) on 5 November 2013..Van Dam was translated into Dutch in 1983 re: Het Experimenteel Laboratorium ISBN 9064432910.
