= Large-group capacitation =

Adult education and social psychology concept

Large-group capacitation is an adult education and social psychology concept associated with the Brazilian sociologist Clodomir Santos de Morais, and grounded in the "activity" of the individual and the social psychology of the large group. When applied to the context of the Organization Workshop (OW), which, historically, has been used mainly for the purpose of job creation and income generation, it is known as Metodología da Capacitação Massiva (MCM) in Portuguese, Método de Capacitación Masiva (MCM) in Spanish and as Large-Group Capacitation Method (LGCM) in English.

== Coinage ==
The English term capacitation is a translation of the terms capacitação (Portuguese) and capacitación (Spanish). Capacitation marks the generic difference between transitive and intransitive modes of learning and communicating implicit in de Morais' aphorism se aprende, porém não se capacita English: [The trainee] learns, but is not capacitated. Capacitation is reminiscent of the adult education concept of conscientization – from the Portuguese conscientização, popularized by Brazilian theorist and activist Paulo Freire. While Freire's work was translated into English as early as 1970, de Morais' Organization Workshop (OW) – and, hence, moraisean large-group capacitation (LGC) – did not come to the attention of the English-speaking public until the mid-80s, when the Chilean Social Psychologists I. & I. Labra moved to Zimbabwe and transferred the method to the (southern) African context. Latino texts were initially translated on an 'ad hoc' basis, including the 'dictionary' translation of capacitación (Spanish) as training (English). Cherrett's 1992 first ever translation into English of de Morais' Apuntes de Teoría de la Organización, also, was still referred to as a "Training" Manual. It was not until the ALFA International Conference in Manchester, UK, in 1998, attended by de Morais and academics from four European and four Latin American Universities, that a consensus was reached on the dedicated terms Capacitation and Large Group Capacitation (LGC).

== Capacitation in community health, adult education and international development ==
Capacitation (outside the field of biology) has been used previously, in English, mainly to emphasize educational content which differs from and/or transcends the basic meaning of the English one-size-fits-all training. In some sectors of Community health, "capacitation" is said to be synonymous with empowering training. Capacitation has also historically been used in the area of adult education, starting with Paulo Freire, who, in the seventies, uses the term "Technical Proficiency Capacitation" to refer to an adult learning activity which can "never be reduced to the level of mere training". In the eighties, Capacitation is defined, by the ILO, as: "availability of opportunities for people to build up their capacities to move from the status of object and passive victims of social processes to the status of subjects guided by self-consciousness and active agents of change". The UNRISD (Geneva) had started (in the seventies) to promote the term capacitation as a "problem-solving, educational" alternative to the then prevalent but mainly pragmatic 'social amelioration' approaches to International development. Jan Nederveen Pieterse contrasts "capacitation" or human development, as proposed by alternative or autonomous (aka self-development) theorists – (such as e.g. Korten, 1990; Max-Neef, 1991; Rahman, 1993 and Carmen, 1996), – with "development-as -economic growth" theorists for whom, according to Pieterse, capital accumulation is the ultimate Development objective. By the mid-nineties, any mention of capacitation had virtually disappeared from the International Development scene, to be replaced by the World-Bank-sponsored Capacity Building. Although de Morais worked for many years with a range of UN and International Agencies, his "Activity"-based pedagogy never became common currency there, possibly, as Sobrado suggests, because of, among others, its then presumed "Evil Empire" pedigree.

== Moraisean large-group capacitation (LGC): overview ==
The major theoretical influence, acknowledged by de Morais, in the development of the LGC concept and method, is the work of Aleksei N. Leontiev specifically his concept of Objective(ized) Activity which means that, in order to change the mind-set of individuals, we need to start with changes to their activity – and/or to the object that "suggests" their activity. Objective(ized) Activity is at the core of what Labra has referred to as "another" tradition of Social Psychology, namely the Cultural-historical Activity Theory-based branch of Social Psychology, which sets it apart from mainstream (behaviorist/lewinian Social Psychology of small groups. The 'locus' of activity-based LGC is the Organization Workshop(OW), a learning event where participants, applying social division of labor principles, master new organizational knowledge and skills through a learning-by-doing approach. In OW-learning, the trainer's role is merely subsidiary (known as "scaffolding" in Activity Theory). In other words, it is not the trainer/instructor who teaches, but "the object that teaches". Moraisean capacitation, then..."involves several elements: mastery of a practical experience, perhaps with some theoretical guidance but at least with some theoretical insight; an element in which the object itself guides or influences the subject's understanding in the course of the activity; a process of critical reflection on action and on motives of action. Crucially, it always involves working with the whole and not a small part of the system".

== History of application ==
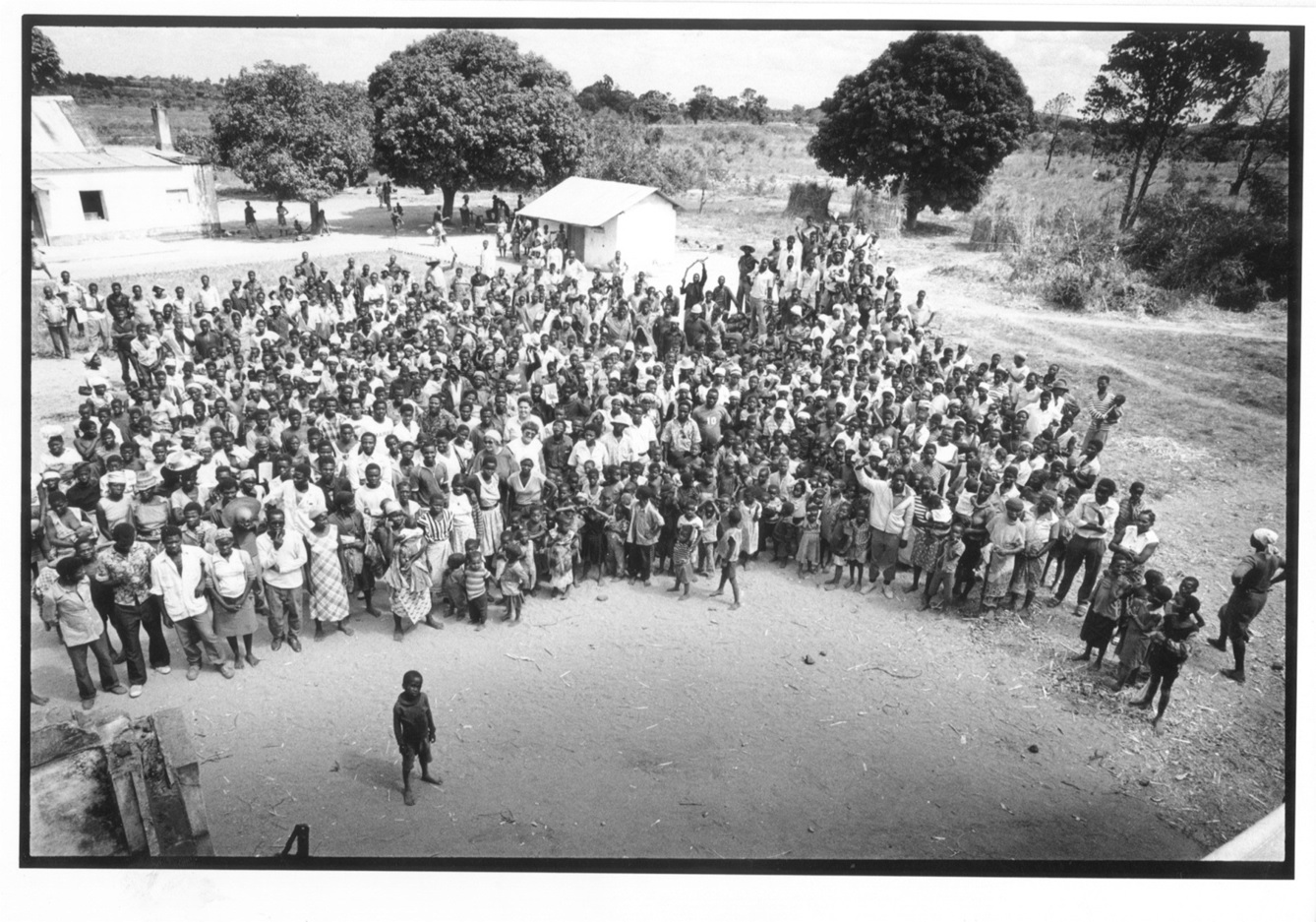
Part of the group of 850 who took part in the 1992 Matzinho 'Field' Organization Workshop (FOW), in war-torn Mozambique

The insights that gave rise to what came to be known as the moraisean Large Group Capacitation Method (LGCM) were an unanticipated consequence of a 30-day course, in 1954, for a large group of the Northeast Region, Brazil Peasant Leagues' middle-level leadership to study Brazilian Agrarian reform law. The group met under clandestine conditions at a family home normally accommodating 7 people, in a heavily policed part of Recife (Brazil). Through the early 1960s de Morais staged workshops of an experimental character throughout the northeast of Brazil. After he was forced into exile following the 1964 coup d'état, he worked as ILO Agrarian Reform Regional Advisor for Central America, and later under the auspices of the Food and Agriculture Organization of the United Nations (FAO), he was able to launch a multitude of 'Experimental Laboratories' (later called Organization Workshops in the Southern Africa version of the method). From 1973 he applied the emerging method to peasants' capacitation within the Agrarian reform Program of Honduras: over three years more than 200 workshops took place, with participation of more than 24000 peasants and government officers from around the region. Over the years de Morais worked as consultant and/or director with the UNDP, FAO, and Catholic Relief Services. Elsewhere the OW has been sponsored by Hivos, Norwegian People's Aid, terre des hommes, Concern Worldwide, Redd Barna and, recently e.g. in South Africa, the Seriti Institute, Soul City Institute and government departments such as South Africa's Department of Social Development. The OW, in a variety of local, regional and national applications, and in different formats, has spread, over the years, to Costa Rica, Mexico, Panamá, Colombia, El Salvador, Honduras, Venezuela, Ecuador, Peru, Nicaragua, Guatemala, Brazil, the Caribbean, a number of African countries as well as Europe.

== See also ==
- Activity theory – Soviet psychological framework
- Aleksei N. Leontiev – Soviet developmental psychologist
- Clodomir Santos de Morais – Brazilian sociologist (1928–2016)
- Cultural-historical activity theory – Theoretical framework in psychology (CHAT)
- Cultural-historical psychology – Branch of psychology
- Experiential learning – Theory and philosophy of learning
- Situated learning – Theory of learning
- Organization Workshop – Business education workshop
- Professional development – Learning to earn or maintain professional credentials
- Lev Vygotsky – Soviet psychologist (1896–1934)
- Zone of Proximal Development – Concept in educational psychology

== Publications ==
- Andersson, Gavin (2004). Unbounded Governance: A Study of Popular Development Organization. UK: Open University.
- Andersson, Gavin (2010). KWANDA. An example of Civic Driven Change? (PDF). South Africa: Seriti Institute. Archived from the original (PDF) on 5 November 2013.
- Andersson, Gavin; Richards, Howard (2012). "Bounded and Unbounded Organization". Africanus. AFRICANUS South Africa Vol 42, Nr 1, pp. 98–119. ISSN 0304-615X.
- Andersson, Gavin (2013). The Activity Theory Approach (PDF). Seriti, S.A.: (pre-booklaunch) chapter from Unbounded Organization:Embracing Societal Enterprise. Archived from the original (PDF) on 5 November 2013.
- Andersson, Gavin; Richards, Howard (2015). Unbounded Organizing in Community. World Dignity University Press. ISBN 9781937570606. Archived from the original on 24 July 2015.
- Araújo, Sebastão Lopes (2009). A Metodologia da Capacitação Massiva como Instrumento de inclusão social: Estudo de caso – The Large Group Capacitation Methodology as an Instrument of social inclusion: a case study (PDF) (in Portuguese). Fortaleza, Ceará State, Brazil: Ceará State University, Br. Archived from the original (PDF) on 5 November 2013.
- Carmen, R; Labra, I.&I.; Davis, M. (1999). Learning from Brazil. Proceedings of the Manchester Conference of 23rd March 1998 & the Synchronous & Asynchrononous online virtual conferencing. Manchester University UK: Manchester Monographs #38. ISBN 9780902252295.
- Carmen, Raff; Sobrado, Miguel (2000). A Future for the Excluded. London, UK: Zed Books. ISBN 9781856497022.
- Correia, Jacinta CB (2001). Comunicación y Capacitación en Empresas Autogestionarias surgidas de Laboratorios Organizacionales – Communication and Capacitation in the Selfmanaging Enterprises resulting from Organization Workshops (in Spanish). Mexico: PhD Thesis Chapingo University.
- Correia, Jainta JB (1994). Comunicação e Capacitação – Communication and Capacitation (in Portuguese). Brasilia, Br: IATTERMUND.
- Correia, Jacinta CB (2007). Learning with Africa: the Case of Mozambique (PDF). Goa (India): Presentation made in Jan 2006 at the 'African Diaspora in India 'TADIA' meeting. Archived from the original (PDF) on 5 November 2013.
- Eade, Deborah (1997). Capacity-building: An Approach to People-centred Development. Oxford, UK: OXFAM. ISBN 9780855983666.
- Freire, Paulo (1970). Pedagogy of the Oppressed (PDF). New York-London: Herder&Herder. ISBN 0-8264-1276-9. Archived from the original (PDF) on 9 June 2014.
- Freire, Paulo (1972). Pedagogy of the Oppressed. London UK: Penguin. ISBN 9780140225839.
- Freire, Paulo (1973). Education for Critical Consciousness. London UK: Sheed & Ward. ISBN 9780722033203.
- Kagan, Carolyn; et al. (2011). Critical Community Psychology. Wiley-Blackwell. UK. ISBN 978-1405188845.
- Labra, Iván (1992). Psicología Social: Responsabilidad y Necesidad – Social Psychology. Responsibility and Need (in Spanish). LOM Ediciones, Chile. ISBN 9567369526.
- Labra, Isabel; Labra, Ivan (2012). The Organization Workshop Method (PDF). Seriti, S.A.: Integra Terra Network Editor. Archived from the original (PDF) on 5 November 2013.
- Labra, Iván (2014). A Critique of the Social Psychology of Small Groups & an Introduction to a Social Psychology of the Large Group (PDF). IntegraTerra - Chile: (pre-booklaunch) Chapter I. Archived from the original (PDF) on 5 August 2017.
- Leontiev, Aleksei N (1978). Activity, Consciousness, and Personality. Prentice-Hall – Translated by Marie J. Hall. ISBN 0-13-003533-5.
- de Morais, Clodomir; et al. (1976). El modelo hondureño de desarrollo agrario – The Honduran model of agrarian development (in Spanish). Tegucigalpa, Honduras: National Government Publication. OCLC 4324202.
- de Morais, Clodomir Santos (1979). Apuntes de teoría de la organización – Notes on theory of Organization (in Spanish). Managua, Nicaragua: PNUD, OIT-NIC/79/010, COPERA Project.
- de Morais, Clodomir Santos (1997). Elementos de teoria da Organização – Notes on Theory of Organization (in Portuguese). IATTERMUND – PRONAGER-AMAZÔNIA. OCLC 169927709.
- de Morais, Clodomir Santos (1987a). Objective conditions and subjective factors (PhD thesis) (in Spanish). Rostock GDR. OCLC 75042725.
- Nacif, Vera (1998). The National Job and Income Development Program in Poverty-Stricken Areas – its Potential – PRONAGER (PDF). Brasilia: Government Brazil Dpt of Culture. pp. 29–35. Archived from the original (PDF) on 8 July 2015.
- Orsatti, Alvaro (2010). CSA (Workers' Federation of the Americas) São Paulo. Brasil (ed.). El principio metodológico de la Capacitación Masiva para Trabajadores autónomos – The methodological principle of Large Group Capacitation for autonomous Workers. Archived from the original on 17 May 2014.
- Pieterse, Jan N. (1998). My Paradigm or Yours? Alternative Development, Post-Development, Reflexive Development (PDF). Development and Change, Vol 28, No 2.
- Ramafoko, Lebo; Andersson, Gavin; Weiner, Renay (2012). Reality Television for Community Development. The Kwanda Initiative in South Africa (PDF). South Africa: Nordicom Review 33 Special Issue pp. 149–162.
- Silveira, Caio M.; et al. (1997). Metodologias de Capacitação – Cefe, Gespar, Capacitação Massiva – Methods of Capacitation – Cefe, Gespar, Large Group Capacitation Method. Rio de Janeiro: FASE. Archived from the original on 11 January 2015.
- Sobrado Chavez, Miguel (2006) [1993]. Capacitación y discapacitación en los proyectos de desarrollo – Capacitation and discapacitation in development projects (PDF) (in Spanish). Costa Rica: FLACSO/Online:ILIDES Foundation. Archived from the original (PDF) on 4 March 2016.
- Sobrado, Miguel; Rojas, Juan José Herrera (2006). America Latina: crisis del Estado clientelista y la construcción de repúblicas ciudadanas – Latin America: crisis of the clientelist state and building the citizen republics (PDF) (in Spanish). Costa Rica: EUNA. ISBN 9977-65-281-3. Archived from the original (PDF) on 5 November 2013.
- Sobrado, Miguel (2012). "La metodología de capacitación masiva y el desarrollo local y regional – Large Group Capacitation in local and regional development". Universidad en Diálogo (in Spanish). II (1). Costa Rica. ISSN 2215-2849.
- Souza, Abel Sydney de (2006). "A Metodologia da Capacitação Massiva: uma alternative á Geração de emprego e renda – Large Group Capacitation: an alternative approach to Job creation and Income Generation". Revista Espaço Acadêmico (in Portuguese). Portugal: Revista Espaço Acadêmico Nr 57 – ULHT Lusofone University of Humanities and Technology. ISSN 1519-6186. Archived from the original on 23 October 2013.
- Tilakaratna, S. (1987). The Animator in Participatory Rural Development: Concept and Practice. Geneva, Switzerland: ILO World Employment Programme WEP. ISBN 92-2-106044-6.
- UNESCO, ibedata (1979). Terminology of Adult Education (trilingual en-es-fr). Paris, Fr.: UNESCO. ISBN 9230016837.
- Vygotsky, Lev S. (1978). Mind in Society: the Development of Higher Psychological Processes. Cambridge, MA: Harvard University Press. ISBN 0-67457629-2.
- Wolfe, Marshall (1996). Elusive Development. London: Zed Books. ISBN 1-85649-380-6.
