= Ehrgott, Forbriger & Co. =

- Industry: Manufacturing
- Founded: 1856
- Founder: Peter E. Ehrgott; Adolphus F. Forbriger
- Headquarters: Cincinnati, Ohio, United States
- Products: lithography portraits

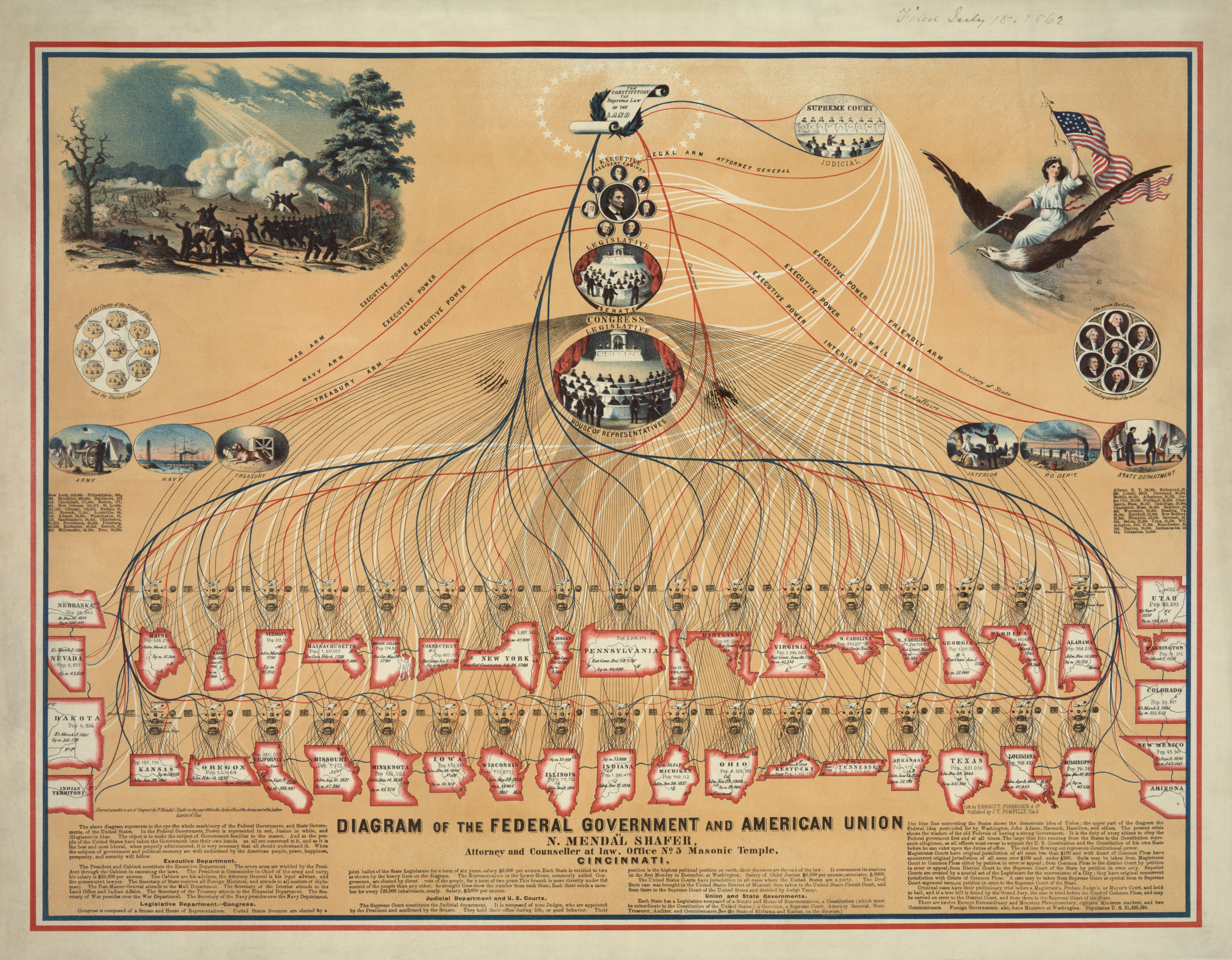
Diagram of the Federal Government and American Union from 1862 lithographed by Ehrgott, Forbriger & Co.

Ehrgott, Forbriger & Co. was a manufacturer of American Civil War lithography portraits and other documents, such as diplomas and maps, established in 1856 by Peter E. Ehrgott and Adolphus F. Forbriger in Cincinnati, Ohio. It was located at the corner of Fourth Street & Walnut, and the two men were the first to use a steam powered press west of New York City in the year 1868.

The original name of the business did not have the "&Co.", which was added in 1860. In 1869 Forbirger died and Adolph K. Krebs became the new partner, and the company name became Ehgrott & Krebs. In 1874 Ehrgott left the company, and the name was changed to Krebs Lithographic Company. The Civil War prints they manufactured were aimed at the general public, including political cartoons, battle scenes and other war-related subjects in addition to the portraits. Most of the civil war portraits the company made are of historic importance, portraits of people such as Abraham Lincoln, John Brough, August Willich, William H. Seward and William S. Rosecrans, to mention a few. Many of the backgrounds and bodies in these portraits were reused for other portraits, though the faces were always correct.
