= Organization workshop =

Business education workshop

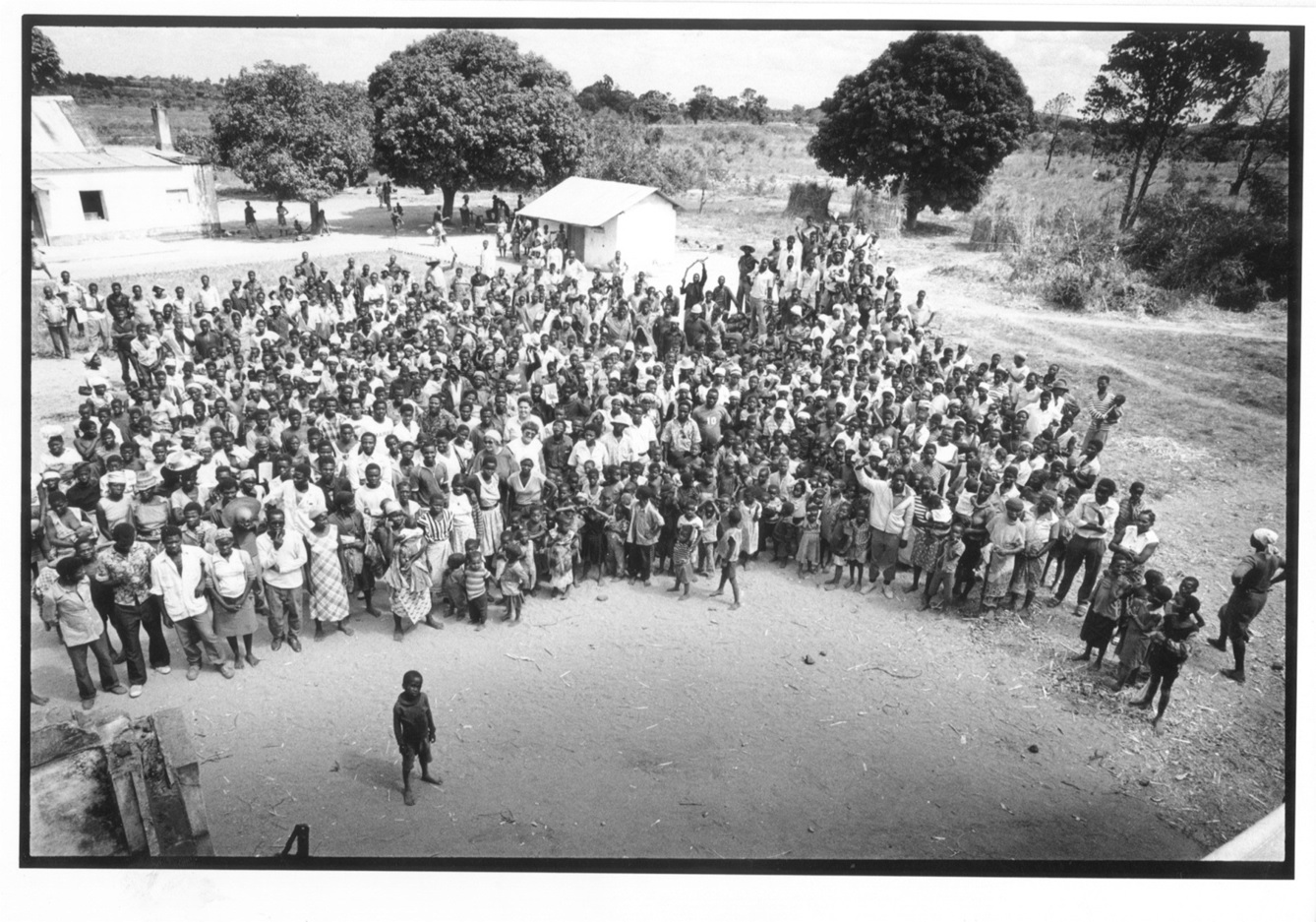
Part of the group of 850 who took part in the 1992 Matzinho "field" organization workshop (FOW), in war-torn Mozambique

The Organization workshop (OW) – or "Laboratorio Organizacional" (LO) in both Portuguese and Spanish – is a CHAT-based learning event where participants master new organizational as well as social knowledge and skills through a learning-by-doing approach. It is aimed at large groups of unemployed and underemployed, a large number of whom sometimes may be persons with lower levels of education (LLEs). The OW addresses locally identified problems which can only be solved by collaborating groups. During a Workshop participants form a temporary enterprise which they themselves manage, an enterprise which contracts to do work at market rates. Once the workshop temporary enterprise is over, organizational, management and vocational skills gained can be used to form new businesses or social enterprises.

The creator of the OW is the Brazilian sociologist Clodomir Santos de Morais. The main elements of the workshop are a large group of people (stipulated originally by de Morais as "minimum 40, with no upper limit") the freedom to organize themselves within the law and all necessary resources in the hands of the group. de Morais' OW guidelines, originally distributed in mimeographed form, were (re)printed in several countries, languages and formats (including popular cartoon) over the years. The text was first translated into English by Ian Cherrett for use in anglophone Africa.

== Field of study ==
de Morais' initial observation was that people, forced by circumstances and sharing one single resource base, learn to organize in a complex manner, involving a division of labor. During the seminal (1954 Recife, Brazil) event which he attended, a large group of activists had gathered in an ordinary town house, where "the cramped conditions of the house, combined with the need for secrecy so as not to arouse the suspicion of the police, ... imposed on the group a strict organizational discipline in terms of division and synchronization of all the tasks needed for such an event". The subsequent finding that little was learned about the event's supposed topic but instead, "an enormous lot about organization" became the inspiration and starting point for the design of what eventually was to become the organization workshop. Building on this, subsequent Moraisean practitioners corroborated de Morais' original finding that "organization" is not taught but "achieved" by a properly composed large group.

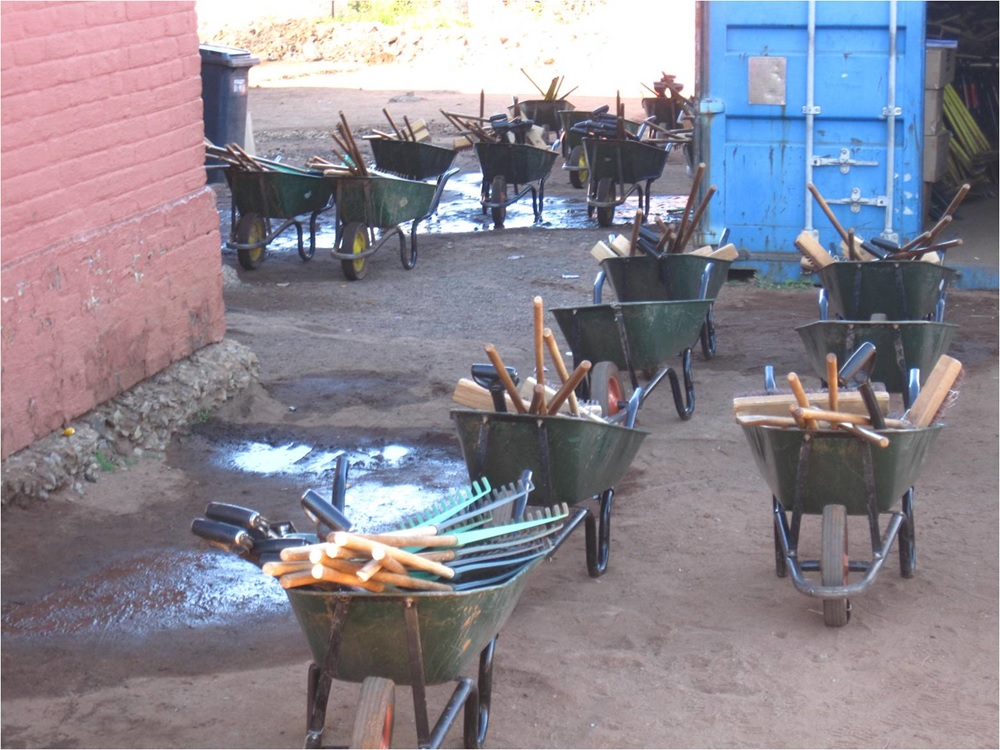
Part of the shared resource base ('Inventory') at the Ntambanana OW (South Africa) November 2012

The OW field of study in the broadest sense is social psychology, the discipline that bridges the gap between psychology and sociology. Because the OW large group approach is Activity-based it stands out in a field notable for a long tradition of behaviorism-based "small group" approaches, such as group dynamics and T-group training.

"Activity-based" means that for people to learn, a real object has to be actually present; as Jacinta Correia puts it: "to learn how to ride a bike, you need a bike to ride on". Thus, for a large group to learn how to manage a complex enterprise, it has to have a complex enterprise to manage. In the OW context, this means that a group averaging 150, many of whom often with lower levels of education, are actively engaged, for an entire month, in (a) productive or service provision enterprise(s). For all the apparent, e.g., on-the-job training and action learning parallels, the OW's defining features are not only the need for a cooperative large group and the creation of (a) complex, real enterprise(s), but, principally, the position of the trainer and the way in which training messages are communicated. In OW-learning, the trainer's role is merely subsidiary (known as "scaffolding" in activity theory). In other words, it is not the trainer/instructor, but "the object that teaches".

In South America, its place of origin, this approach is known as the Método de Capacitación Masiva (MCM) or large-group capacitation method (LGCM).

== International scope ==
The OW originated in Brazil with de Morais' 1954 Recife workshop. In the wake of the coup d'état of March 1964, de Morais went into a 23-year exile in Chile, and the OW spread from there in the late sixties. After specializing in Cultural Anthropology (Santiago University) and in Land Reform at the ICIRA (Capacitation and Research Institute for Agrarian Reform Institute), de Morais became consultant for international and national development institutions and NGOs. Since then, the organization workshop has become a constant in a number of agrarian reform efforts in Latin America and (community) development projects elsewhere. From Chile, the OW spread to Costa Rica, Mexico, Panamá, Colombia, El Salvador, Venezuela, Ecuador, Honduras, Peru, Nicaragua, Guatemala, Brazil, the Caribbean, a number of African countries as well as Europe. In 2015, for the first time in the UK, a pilot OW took place at 'Marsh Farm' urban housing Estate, Luton (near London) as part of a government supported Enterprise and Job creation project.

== Impact ==
=== During an OW ===
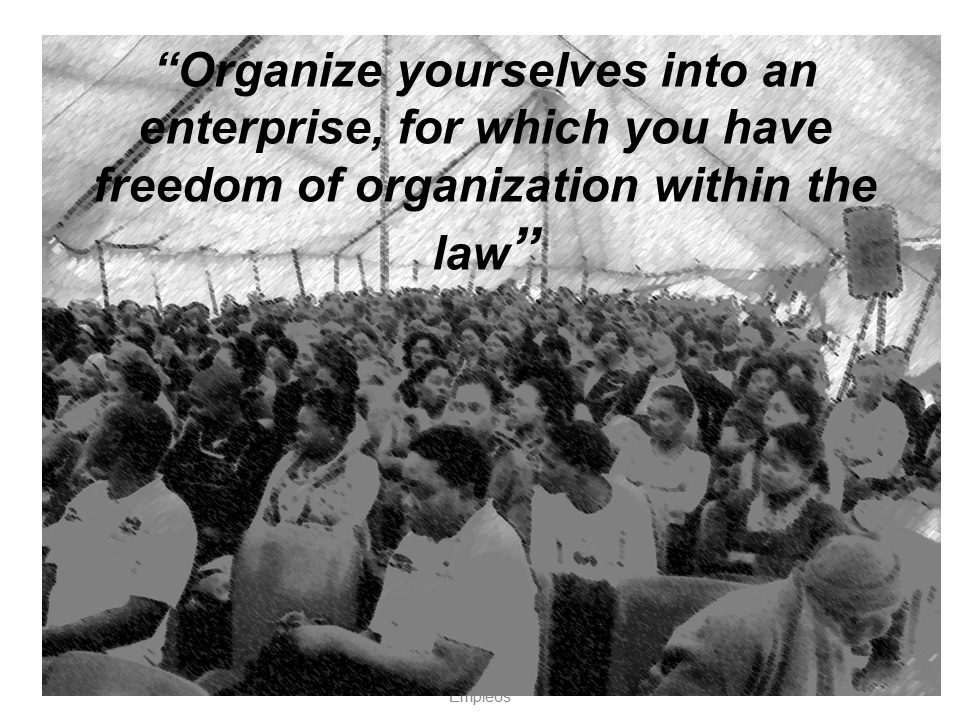
OWfreedomtoorganizewithinlaw

Running an OW requires both a facilitators' enterprise (FE) and a participants' enterprise (PE), originally called "primary" and "secondary" structures by de Morais and called respectively "crew" and "team" in, for example, the SABC-televised Kwanda OWs in South Africa in the noughties. The FE is the framework set up for all organizational and learning activities before, during and after the Workshop. It is created before the workshop and remains in place after it closes. The participants' first job, in turn, is to set up a PE which, usually after a period of trial and error referred to as anomie by de Morais, starts organizing work, subject to negotiation of a contract with the FE. Work delivered during the OW is then paid from the development fund at market rates.

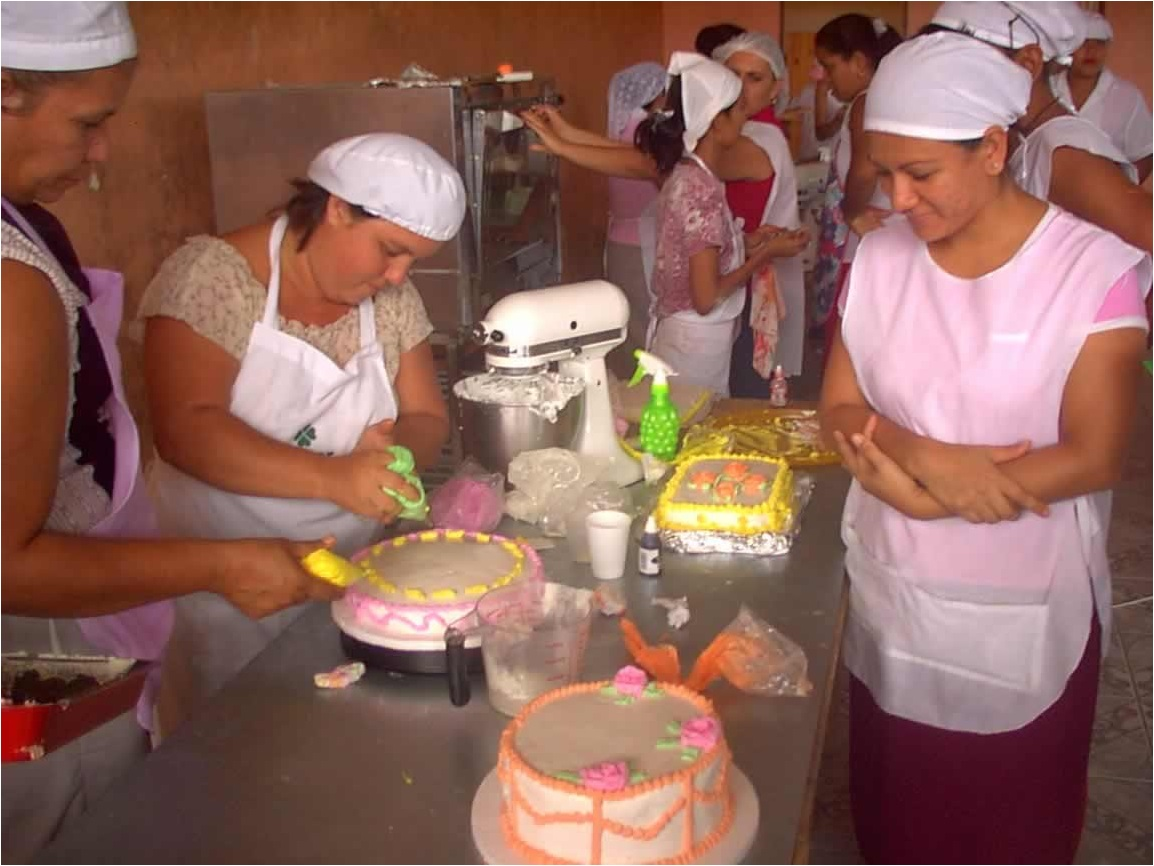
Vocational skills course during the Laurel OW (Costa Rica) Nov 2005

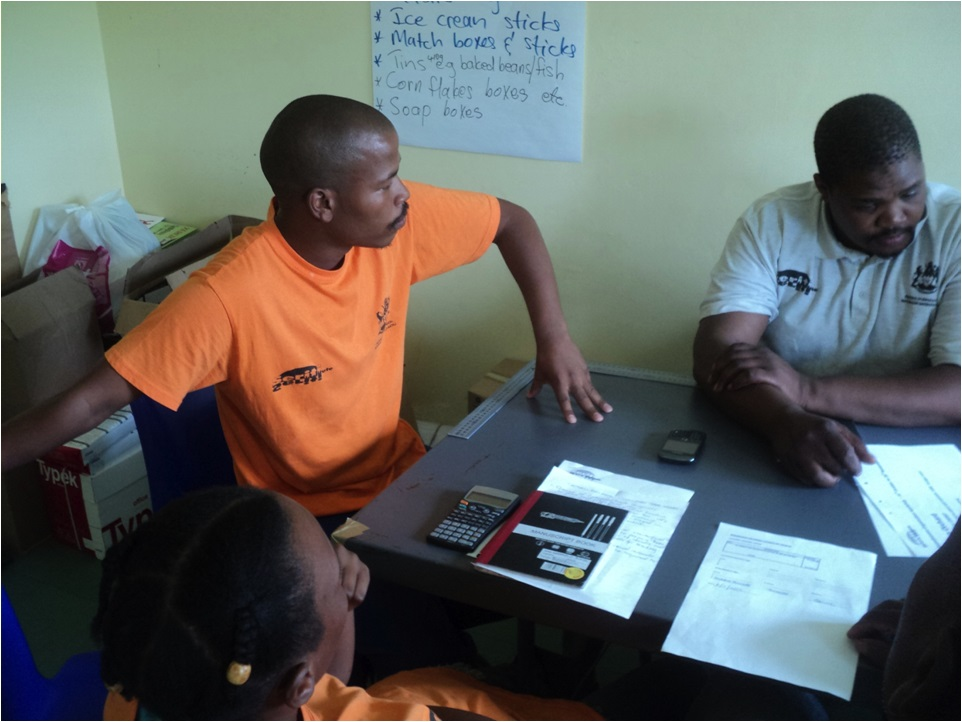
Contract negotiation 2012 OW (S.Africa)

Lectures on the "theory of organization" (TO) are an integral and compulsory part of the OW process. These lectures (1 ½ hours a day for two weeks) are meant to enable members of the PE to gain a perspective on their historical, social and economic context, on the working of the market economy, on current patterns and models of organization, as well as insights in individual and collective behavior. Skills acquired include practical enterprise organization and management skills including labor and time management, financial record-keeping and reporting, planning, quoting and tendering for work, vocational skills such as e.g. building, welding, tailoring, farming, catering or IT skills, and literacy and numeracy development.

=== Post-OW ===
Sponsoring bodies since the 1960s have ranged from United Nations organizations to local and international development agencies and NGOs, among them FAO, ILO, UNDP, terre des hommes, Concern Worldwide, Catholic Relief Services, Hivos and Norwegian People's Aid, Redd Barna and, recently e.g. in South Africa, the Soul City Institute and government departments such as South Africa's Department of Social Development.

Correia considers drawing up a correct quantitative, let alone qualitative balance sheet of the OW experience a "virtually impossible" task. Based on results of qualitative research into the OW she conducted, she tentatively "ventures some conservative estimates": 15% of OW participants are estimated to subsequently start an enterprise of one kind or another which, in the case of Brazil – (anno 2000, the publication year of 'A Future') – amounts to 9,000 enterprises.

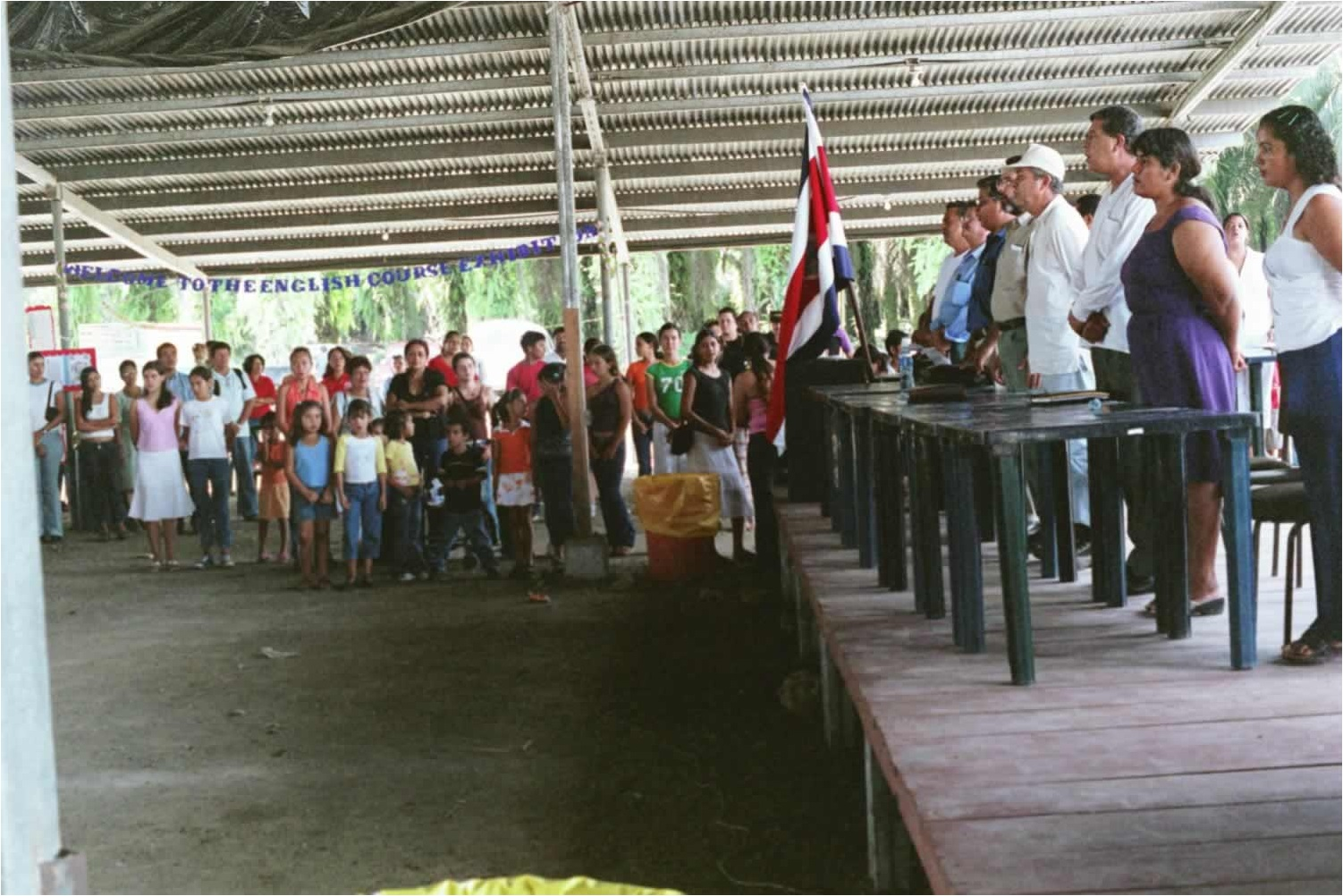
Closing Ceremony Laurel OW 2005. Among the Vocational courses the 543 participants chose were English (see banner), Carpentry, Electronics, Confectionery, IT, and others.

An additional estimated 30% (equivalent to 8,000 persons) subsequently find work. Counting in family members, she arrives at 27,000 persons who, in her research sample, "have drawn some economic benefit from the OW, ... at an estimated unit cost of a mere $16 per person". Andersson similarly estimates the impact of the 2009–10 Kwanda program in South Africa: 5,000 participants; 200,000 community member beneficiaries; 2,000,000 viewers and listeners reached per week.

The OW's "massive" claim – (re: Capacitación 'Masiva' in Spanish/Portuguese) – is at its most visible when, as in the case of Brazil, Honduras or Costa Rica, it is run on a regional or national basis (known as PROGER/PRONAGER or National Job & Income Generation Program) which, in de Morais' mind, ought to be the OW's default mode: 110,946 people participated in 282 OWs in Brazil from 2000 to 2002. The report further cites 3,194 resulting enterprise start-ups and 25,077 new jobs; 22,000 participated in 104 São Paulo PAE (Self-Employment) Program from 1996 to 1998, resulting in 711 new enterprises, including People's Banks. 27,000 Hondurans and other nationals participated in more than 200 OWs during the 1973–1976 national PROCCARA Program in Honduras which led to the creation of 1,053 new enterprises, some of the bigger ones still operating today (see e.g. Hondupalma below). 6,000 Cooperative (INSCOOP) workers graduated under the 1979 POR/OIT/PNUD/007 Program (Portugal). The Costa Rica (2010–13) Brunca Region GERMINADORA Project was decreed a "Project of Public Interest" by President Chinchilla Miranda in 2012. In 2015, 411 persons participated in the Westonaria (S. Africa) Organization Workshop, originally planned for 350.

Long-term survival rates of OW-initiated enterprises—(as compared to conventional micro-enterprises, where failure rates allegedly may be as high as 80% in their first year of operation).—are exemplified by e.g.: 13 surviving—in 2000—Costa-Rican cooperatives; the Honduran—(ex-1970s PROCCARA campaign)—palm oil growing and processing plants Hondupalma, Salama and Coapalma. In 1999 the Costa Rican Coopesilencio cooperative celebrated its 25th year of operation with a book by Barrantes. Since then, Coopesilencio has added eco-tourism to its activities.

== Controversy ==
The activity-based OW approach stands out from mainstream behaviorism-based small group approaches. That is by itself a potential source of controversy in both academia and accepted field practice.

Critique of the OW (and, indirectly, of de Morais) has come from both left and right, the latter, wary of de Morais' conceptual mode and language "throwback to the 50s" in which de Morais' original Theory of Organization is couched, "felt that his ideas needed rejecting". Nonetheless, his format was readily accepted by international organizations over the decades. Van Dam adds that the Latin American "bourgeois establishment" clearly saw peasant autonomy brought about by the OW as "a threat to the established order" and did all in their power to disrupt it, for example by withholding state support.

The "institutional left", broadly defined as countries identifying, pre 1989, with the Eastern Bloc, including Cuba, never embraced de Morais' autonomous job creation and income generation method. Revolutionary Nicaragua did allow the 1980 COPERA or "Capacitation Project for the Organization of Producers and Job Creation" OW pilot project, sponsored by the ILO and the Nicaraguan Institute for Agrarian Reform, which was to become the mould for a nationwide Nicaraguan SIPGER (Job & Income Generation System), on the Honduran model, but the Sandinista government cut short the project on 29 December 1980, with a memorandum critical of the OW: "those Experimental Laboratories contribute to the bourgeois mindset in capitalist countries" while "surplus production serves the particular group and not the national interest". Van Dam concurs by noting that a revolutionary Sandinista government, beset by internal economic crisis, conflict with neighboring States and a Contra uprising, felt that it needed to be strongly 'in control' of the political process, including 'popular participation'.

A second strand of "left" criticism tends to come, on the one hand, from the ideological 'hard' left "whose trenchant criticism of de Morais derives partly from [this] apparent neglect of the exploitative features of the capitalist mode of production, while there is open admiration for [the OW's] organizing method" and, on the other hand, from what could be broadly termed the "liberation theology/Freirean conscientization" stream of practice, which de Morais encountered when working with the MST (Landless Workers) Movement in Brazil. Morais (sometimes also spelled "Moraes") – typically is criticized by this group for, among other things, being too "rigid and dogmatic". The latter's critical views tend to express a preference for Freirean-inspired critical pedagogy consciousness-raising and "root cause"-finding approaches whereas de Morais' method focuses on "organizational" consciousness.

Sobrado points to another source of resistance to the OW, which does not necessarily come from either left or right, but is rooted, instead, in the status quo, perceived to be threatened by "a sure fire way of developing the capacities of the poor". This "annoys the organizations and institutions that appear to operate according to a more or less cleverly disguised clientelist hidden agenda".

The anthropologist Josh Fisher's 2010 detailed Génesis case study Building Consciousness: The Organization Workshop Comes to a Nicaraguan Cooperative can be counted as a critique of the OW. Fisher argues that "the most illuminating aspect of the Génesis OW...is not its success or failure, narrowly defined, but rather the unintended consequences [of the OW] that have originated in large part from the space between the actual existing social and organizational dynamics in the Génesis cooperative before the workshop, on the one hand, and the OW's model for those dynamics, on the other."

== See also ==
- Aleksei N. Leontiev
- Clodomir Santos de Morais
- Experiential learning
- Zone of proximal development

== Bibliography ==
- Andersson, Gavin (2004). Unbounded Governance: A Study of Popular Development Organization. UK: Open University.
- Andersson, Gavin (2010). KWANDA. An example of Civic Driven Change?. South Africa: Seriti Institute. Archived from the original on 27 November 2015.
- Andersson, Gavin; Richards, Howard (2012). "Bounded and Unbounded Organization" (PDF). Africanus. AFRICANUS South Africa Vol 42, Nr 1, pp. 98-119. ISSN 0304-615X. Archived from the original on 3 March 2016.
- Andersson, Gavin (2013). The Activity Theory Approach (PDF). Seriti, S.A.: (pre-booklaunch) chapter from Unbounded Organization:Embracing Societal Enterprise. Archived from the original (PDF) on 5 November 2013.
- Andersson, Gavin; Richards, Howard (2015). Unbounded Organizing in Community. World Dignity University Press. ISBN 978-1-937570-60-6. Archived from the original on 24 July 2015.
- Araújo, Sebastão Lopes (2009). A Metodologia da Capacitação Massiva como Instrumento de inclusão social: Estudo de caso – The Large Group Capacitation Methodology as an Instrument of social inclusion: a case study (PDF) (in Portuguese). Fortaleza, Ceará State, Brazil: Ceará State University, Br. Archived from the original (PDF) on 5 November 2013.
- Carmen, R; Labra, I.&I.; Davis, M. (1999). Learning from Brazil. Proceedings of the Manchester Conference of 23rd March 1998 & the Synchronous & Asynchrononous online virtual conferencing. Manchester University UK: Manchester Monographs #38. ISBN 978-0-902252-29-5.
- Carmen, Raff; Sobrado, Miguel (2000). A Future for the Excluded. London, UK: Zed Books. CiteSeerX 10.1.1.695.1688. ISBN 978-1-85649-702-2.
- Correia, Jacinta CB (2001). Comunicación y Capacitación en Empresas Autogestionarias surgidas de Laboratorios Organizacionales – Communication and Capacitation in the Selfmanaging Enterprises resulting from Organization Workshops (PhD thesis) (in Spanish). Mexico: Chapingo University.
- Correia, Jainta JB (1994). Comunicação e Capacitação – Communication and Capacitation (in Portuguese). Brasilia, Br: IATTERMUND.
- Correia, Jacinta CB (2007). Learning with Africa: the Case of Mozambique (PDF). Goa (India): Presentation made in Jan 2006 at the 'African Diaspora in India 'TADIA' meeting. Archived from the original (PDF) on 5 November 2013.
- IICA, Instituto Interamericano de Ciencias Agricolas (1977). Seminario de Analisis y Evaluación de Laboratorios Experimentales – Experimental Workshops Analysis and Evaluation Seminar (in Spanish). San José, Costa Rica 12-16 Dec. 1977: PRACA Training and Study Program on Agrarian Reform and Rural Development in the Central American Isthmus.
- IICA, Instituto Interamericano de Ciencias Agricolas (1979). Laboratorio Experimental de Capacitación en Organización – Experimental Workshop on Organizational Capacitation (in Spanish). Bogotá, Colombia: SENA Servicio Nacional de Aprendizaje.
- Labra, Iván (1992). Psicología Social: Responsabilidad y Necesidad – Social Psychology. Responsibility and Need (in Spanish). LOM Ediciones. Chile. ISBN 956-7369-52-6.
- Labra, Isabel; Labra, Ivan (2012). The Organization Workshop Method (PDF). Seriti, S.A.: Integra Terra Network Editor. Archived from the original (PDF) on 5 November 2013.
- Labra, Iván (2014). A Critique of the Social Psychology of Small Groups & an Introduction to a Social Psychology of the Large Group (PDF). IntegraTerra – Chile: (pre-booklaunch) Chapter I. Archived from the original (PDF) on 5 August 2017.
- de Morais, Clodomir, Santos (1979). Apuntes de teoría de la organización – Notes on theory of Organization (in Spanish). Managua, Nicaragua: PNUD, OIT-NIC/79/010, COPERA Project.
- de Morais, Clodomir, Santos (1987). Objective conditions and subjective factors. PhD Thesis (in Spanish). Rostock GDR. OCLC 75042725.
- Silveira, Caio, M.; et al. (1997). Metodologias de Capacitação – Cefe, Gespar, Capacitação Massiva – Methods of Capacitatio – Cefe, Gespar, Large Group Capacitation Method. Rio de Janeiro: FASE. Archived from the original on 11 January 2015.
- Sobrado, Miguel; Stoller, Richard (September 2002). "Organizational Empowerment versus Clientelism". Latin American Perspectives. 29 (126/5): 7–19. doi:10.1177/0094582X0202900502. S2CID 154854178.
- Sobrado, Miguel; Rojas, Juan José Herrera (2006). EUNA (ed.). America Latina: crisis del Estado clientelista y la construcción de repúblicas ciudadanas – Latin America: crisis of the clientelist state and building the citizen republics (PDF) (in Spanish). Costa Rica. ISBN 9977-65-281-3. Archived from the original (PDF) on 5 November 2013.
- Van Dam, C. (1982). EL LABORATORIO EXPERIMENTAL DE C. SANTOS DE MORAIS – UNA PEDAGOGIA PARA LA ORGANIZACIÓN SOCIAL – The Experimental Workshop of C. Santos de Morais – a pedagogy for social organization (PDF). The Hague Netherlands: CESO. Archived from the original (PDF) on 5 November 2013. For 'Experimental' see
