= Diagram of the Federal Government and American Union =

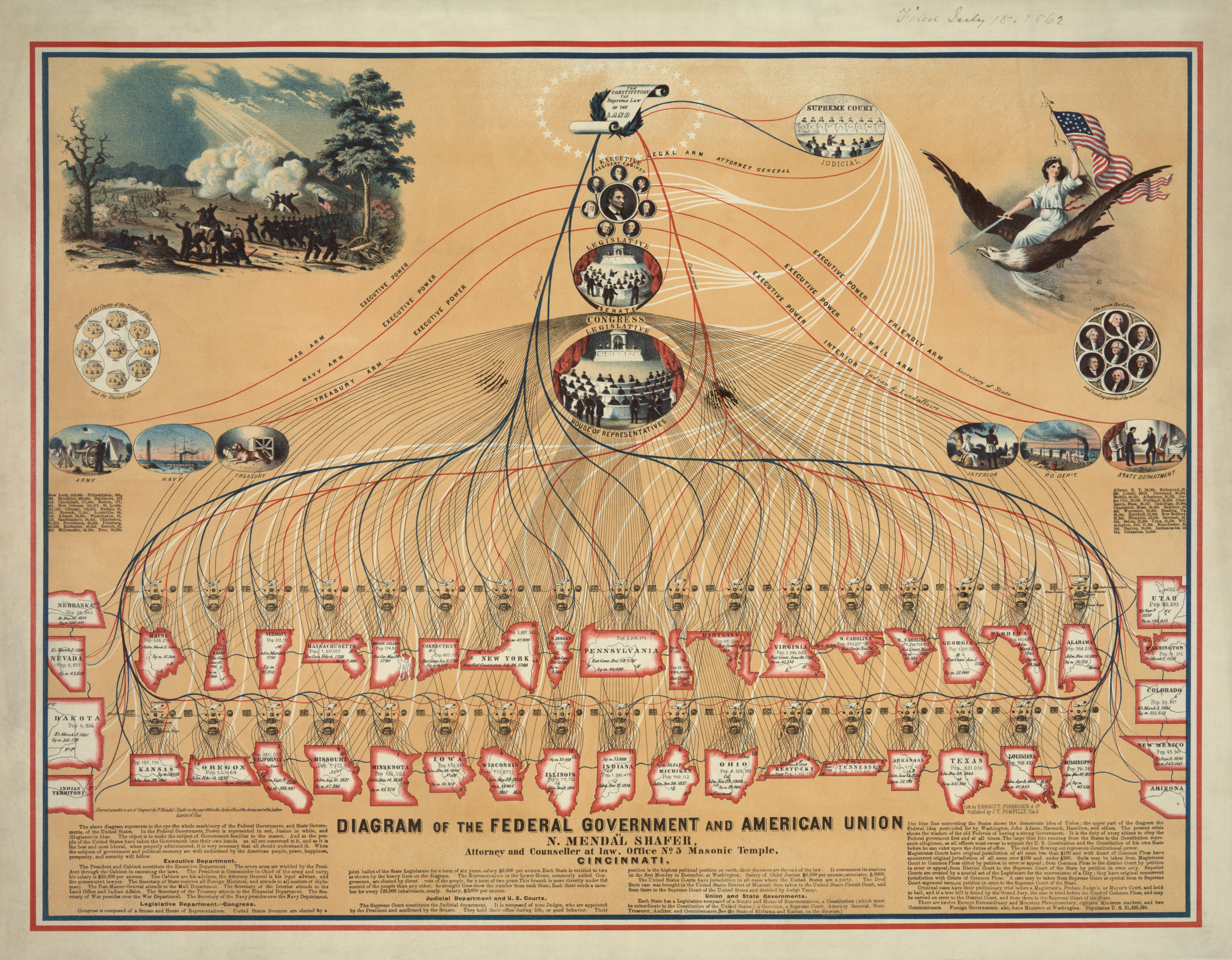
Diagram of the U.S. federal government and American Union in 1862

The Diagram of the Federal Government and American Union is an organizational chart of the Federal government of the United States and the American Union designed by N. Mendal Shafer, and published July 1862 during the American Civil War.

The political landscape was radically altered and the diagram was probably outdated. The diagram eventually ended up in the archives of the US Library of Congress.

== Overview ==
The Diagram of the Federal Government and American Union was intended to show the whole of the US Federal government and the relationships between its different parts. It shows the outline of 42 states and Indian Territory, a Civil War battle scene, and Liberty holding U.S. flag and sword riding on the back of an eagle, Abraham Lincoln and his cabinet (the secretaries linked to images of the Army, Navy, Treasury, Interior, P.O. Dept., and State Department) representing the "Executive" branch, the Senate and the House of Representatives representing the "Legislative" branch, and the Supreme Court representing the "Judicial" branch of the federal government. Also, its portraits of "The seven builders and leading spirits of the revolution."

The diagram is designed by Noah Mendal Shafer, who was an attorney, counsellor at law and inventor. He held office at Masonic Temple in Cincinnati. Onion (2014) interpreted that Mendal Shafer aimed "to end the conflict between North and South through education. 'The object' of the chart, Shafer writes, 'is to make the subject of Government familiar to the masses.' Familiarity, he intimates, would solve the problems that the nation was experiencing; the implication is that secessionists (and, perhaps, people living in the North who didn’t support the war) just didn’t comprehend the government’s purpose."

The Diagram was published in two editions:

- The "Diagram of the Federal Government and American Union" of 1861, and
- The "Diagram of the Federal Government, Or the Great Republic of the United States of America" from 1864.

The map was lithographed by Ehrgott, Forbriger & Co., a manufacturer of American Civil War lithography portraits and other documents, such as diplomas and maps. Later in the 1860s Mendal Shafer moved to the city of New York, where he once more came into prominence for receiving a patent for the invention of "improvements in binders for papers and the like, which allow the whole or parts of the contents to be removed or exchanged" on the 4th May, 1867, and a patent for a washing machine in 1868. The map was published in 1862 by J.T. Pompilly, a life insurance agents, in Cincinnati.

== History ==
The Diagram of the Federal Government and American Union is designed was 1861 at the break of the American Civil War. This civil war was fought from 1861 to 1865 to determine the survival of the Union or independence for the Confederacy. Among the 34 states as of January 1861, seven Southern slave states individually declared their secession from the United States and formed the Confederate States of America, known as the "Confederacy" or the "South".

=== Similar works in the 1860s ===
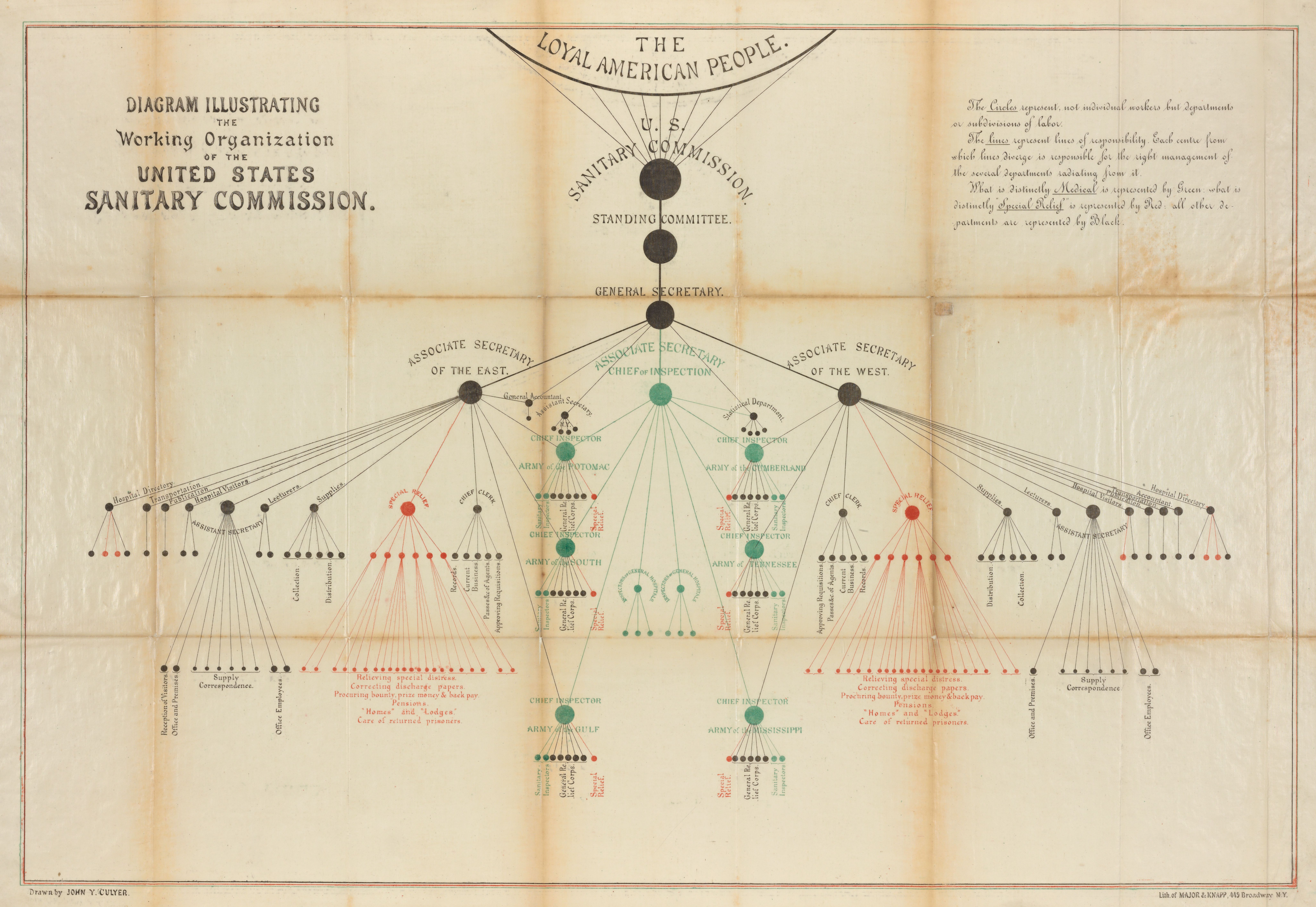
Early Organizational chart of the U.S. Sanitary Commission by John Y. Culyer, 1864

The chart has some of the characteristics of the first modern organizational charts, but it was not the first in its kind. About seven years earlier around 1854 the Scottish-American engineer Daniel McCallum created the first organizational chart of American business, which was drawn by George Holt Henshaw. In the same time, that Mendal Shafer presented his work in Cincinnati and in New York, in Washington the civil engineer John Y. Culyer and assistant to Frederick Law Olmsted designed a modern organizational chart of the U.S. Sanitary Commission. This 1864 diagram was entitled "Diagram illustrating the working organization of the United States Sanitary Commission."

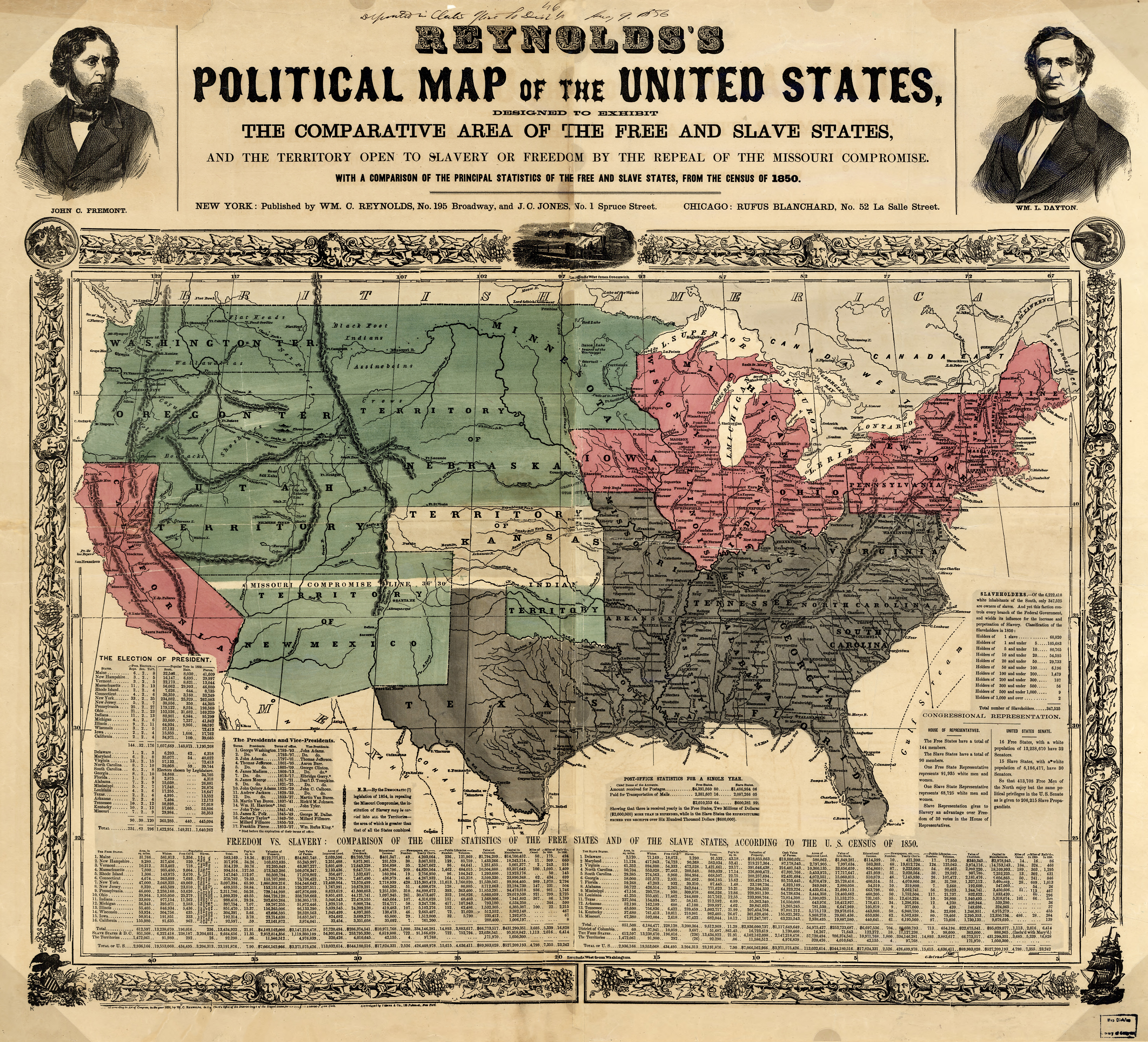
Political Map of US, 1856

In the early 1860s also different types of political maps had been published. One early example is Reynolds's Political Map of the United States from 1856. This map was designed to exhibit the comparative area of the free and slave states and the territory open to slavery or freedom by the repeal of the Missouri Compromise.

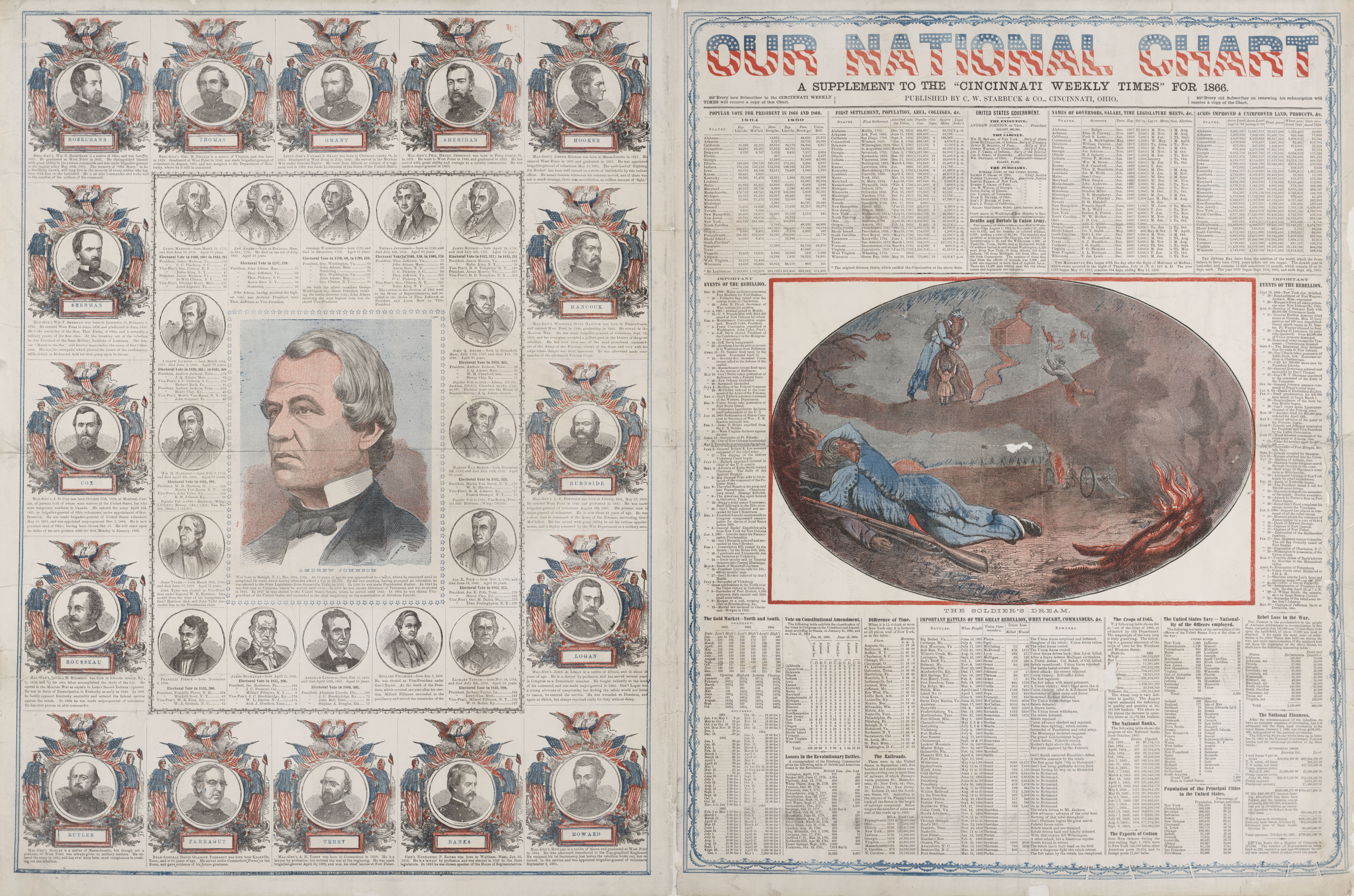
"Our national chart", a supplement to the Cincinnati Weekly Times, 1866.

Another example was "Our national chart" was published in 1866 as supplement to the Cincinnati Weekly Times ifor 1866. The print shows on the right side the "illustration of 'The soldier's dream' in which a soldier asleep on the ground during the Civil War dreams of returning home to loved ones; left side illustration shows bust portrait of Andrew Johnson with cameo portraits of the previous sixteen presidents and sixteen generals who fought during the Civil War.

=== Further developments ===
Little is known about the dissemination of the Diagram of the Federal Government and American Union. It is noted, that in 1864 Mendal Shafer delivered his Diagram of the Federal Government to the Board of Education of the City of New York, which passed it along to the Committee on Course of Studies and School Books without any further comments. By the end of the American Civil War in 1865, the political landscape was radically altered and the diagram was probably outdated.

For decades the diagram was hardly heard from. Exceptionally, the map was listed in the 1880 Catalogue of the Mercantile Library of Brooklyn, and in a 1904 edition of the Bulletin of the New York Public Library, which listed "Diagram of the Federal government, or the great republic of the United States of America. New York," from 1864. In 1965 American Book Prices Current. William J. Smith reported a "Diagram of the Federal Government and American Union." with a "Description of the functions and duties of the branches of government with vignettes of Lincoln and historical scenes" for the price of $100, and a 1975 book on U.S. Civil War store cards listed the map as well.

In the new millennium the diagram was digitalized by the Library of Congress. It was uploaded the Wikipedia in 2008 and in retouched version became featured article in 2013. Correa (2014) and others recognized the diagram as a milestone in the "History and Evolution of Social Network Visualization."

=== Modern visualisation of the Federal Government ===
The 1861 Diagram of the Federal Government and American Union didn't set a standard. As information graphic it visualized multiple elements, which later on are generally being visualized separately in different media such as maps, organizational charts, and diagrams. For example:

Modern types of visualisations of the Federal Government
Map of the United States, which is composed of fifty self-governing states and several territories.

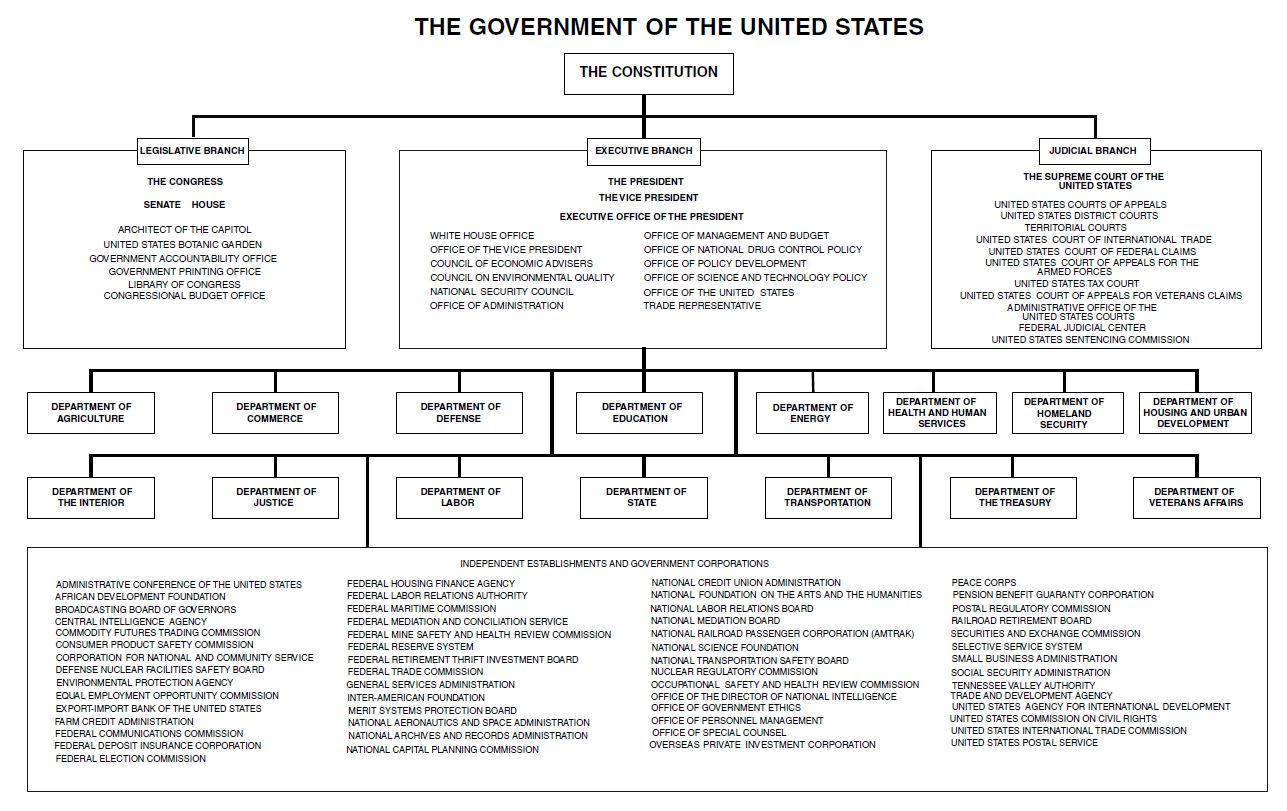
Organizational chart of the Government of the United States, 2011

Flow diagram of the political system of the United States.

First, maps of the United States territories and its states have been drawn since its colonisation in the 16th and 17th century. Second, the use of organizational charts to picture public and private organizations has become into use in the first part of the 20th century. It has become common use to chart governmental organizations in multiple (partly) overlapping organizational charts. For example, here shown the 2011 Organizational chart of the Government of the United States from The United States Government Manual 2011, was the first of a series of over 70 charts of the Government of the United States. And last diagrams of the political system, which have come in use later on in the 20th century.

== The diagram ==
=== Topic and aim ===
On the bottom side of map, Mendal Shafer (1862) described the maps topic, its construction and aim of the diagram. He wrote:

"The above diagram represent to the eye the whole machinery of the Federal Government of the United States. In the Federal Government, Power is represented in re, Justice in white, and Allegiance in blue. The object is to make the subject of Government familiar to the masses. And as the people of the United States have taken the Government into their own hands, as all are concerned in it, and as it is the best and most liberal, when properly administered, it is very necessary that all should understand it. When the subject of government and political economy are well understood by the American people, peace, happiness, prosperity, and security will follow."

=== Departments of the Federal Government ===
About the Executive Department Mendal Shafer (1862) wrote:

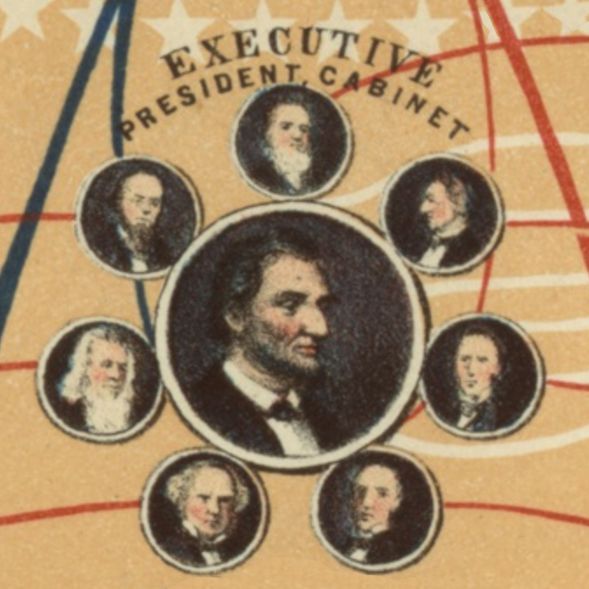
Executive President Cabinet, 1862

"The President and Cabinet constitute the Executive department. The seven arms are wielded by the President through the Cabinet in executing the laws. The President is Commander-in-Chief of the army and navy; his salary is $25.000 per annum. The Cabinet are his advisers, the Attorney General is its legal adviser, and the government lawyer. The Secretary of State receives all Foreign Ministers, and attends to all matters of diplomacy. The Post-Master-General attends to the Mail department. The Secretary of the Interior attends to the Land Office and Indian Affairs. The Secretary of the Treasury attends to the Financial Department. The Secretary of the navy presides over the Navy Department."

And about the Legislative Department - Congress the text continued:

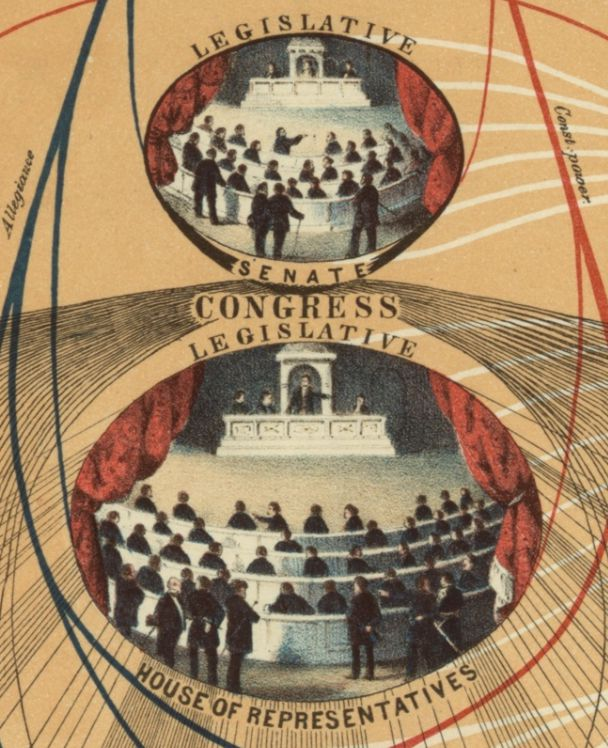
Congress and House of Representatives, 1862

"Congress is composed of a Senate and House of Representatives. The United States Senators are elected by a joint ballot of the State Legislature for a term of six years, salary $6.000 per annum. Each State is entitled to two as shown by the heavy lines in the diagram. The Representatives in the Lower House commonly called Congressmen, are elected by direct vote of the people, for a term of two years. This branch is more directly under the control of the people that any other. The straight lines show the number from each State. Each State sends a member for every 129.000 inhabitants, nearly. Salary $3.000 per annum."

And about the Judicial Department and U.S. Courts:

"The Supreme Court constitutes the Judicial department. It is composed of nine Judges, who are appointed by the President and confirmed by the Senate. They hold their office during life, or good behavior. Their position is the highest political position on earth; their decisions are rge end of the law. It commences its sessions on the first Monday in December, at Washington. Salary of Chief Justice $6.500 per annum; associates $6.000. Scott case was brought in the United States District of Missouri, then taken to the United States Circuit Court, and from there to the Supreme Court of the United States and decided by Judge Tancy."

And about the Union and State Governments:

"Each State has a Legislature composed of a Senate and House of Representatives, a Constitution (which must be subordinate to the Constitution of the United States) a Governor, a Supreme Court, Attorney General, State Treasurer, Auditor, and Commissioners, (See the State of Alabama and Kansas, on the diagram.)

And furthermore Shafer (1862) wrote in the bottom right corner of the diagram:

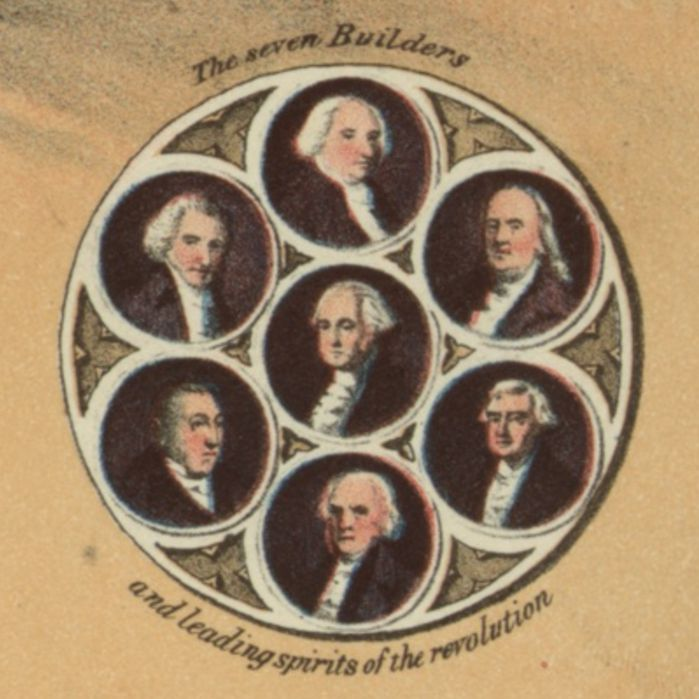
The seven Builders and leading spirits of the revolution, 1862

"The blue line connecting the States shows the democratic idea of Union; the upper part of the diagram the Federal idea contended for by Washington, John Adams, Hancock, Hamilton and others. The present crisus shows the wisdom of the old Federals of having strong Government. It is the duty of every citizen to obey the Federal Government first and at all times. The large blue line running from the States to the Constitution represents allegiance, as all officers must swear to support the U.S. Constitution and the Constitution of his own State before he can enter upon the duties of office. The red line flowing out represents Constitutional power.
Magistrates Courts have original jurisdiction of all sums over less than $100 and with Court of Common Pleas have concurrent original jurisdiction of all sums over $100 and under $300. Suits may be taken from Magistrates Court to Common Pleas either by petition in error or appeal; from Common Pleas to the district Court by petition in error or appeal; from District Court to the Supreme Court of the State by petition in error only. Superior Courts are created by a special act of the Legislature for the convenience of a City; they have original concurrent jurisdiction with Courts of Common leas. A case may be taken from Supreme Court at special term to Supreme Court at general term; on petition in error to the Supreme Court of the State.
Criminal cases have their preliminary trial before a Magistrate's, Probate Judge's, or Mayor's Court, and held to bail, and if true bill is found by the Grand Jury, the case is tried before the Court of Common Pleas, and may be carried on error to the District Court, and from there to the Supreme Court of the State.
There are twelve Envoys Extraordinary and Ministers Plenipotentiary, eighteen Ministers resident, and two Commissioners. Foreign Governments, also have Ministers at Washington. Population U. S. 31,429,89`."
