= Santa Maria da Vitória =

Coordinates: 13°24′S 44°12′W

Santa Maria da Vitória Samavi
- Municipality
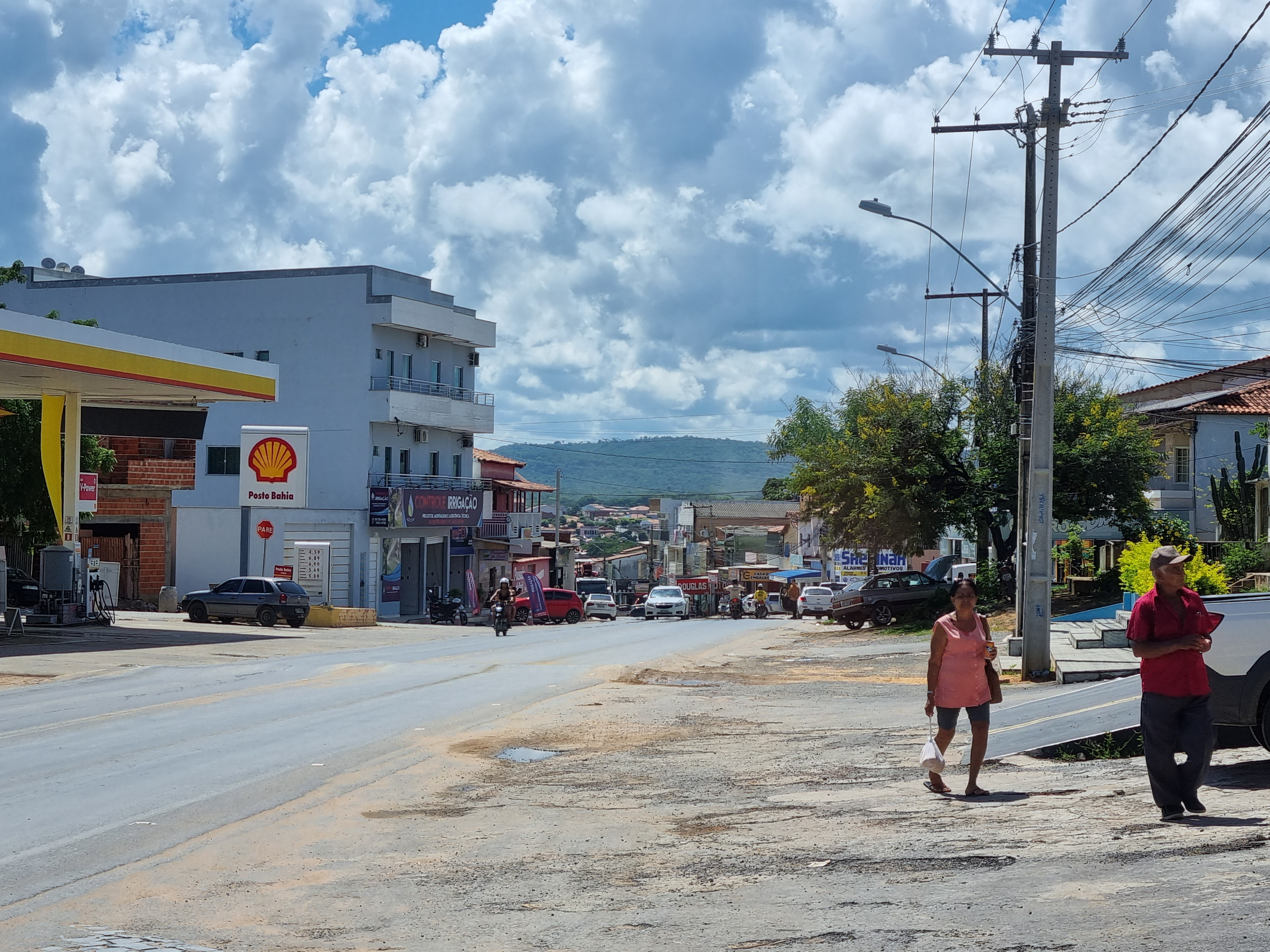

- Flag
- Interactive map of Santa Maria da Vitória
- Country: Brazil
- Region: Nordeste
- State: Bahia

Population (2020)
  - Total: 39,775
- Time zone: UTC−3 (BRT)

Santa Maria da Vitória is a municipality in the state of Bahia in the North-East region of Brazil.
