= Hivos =

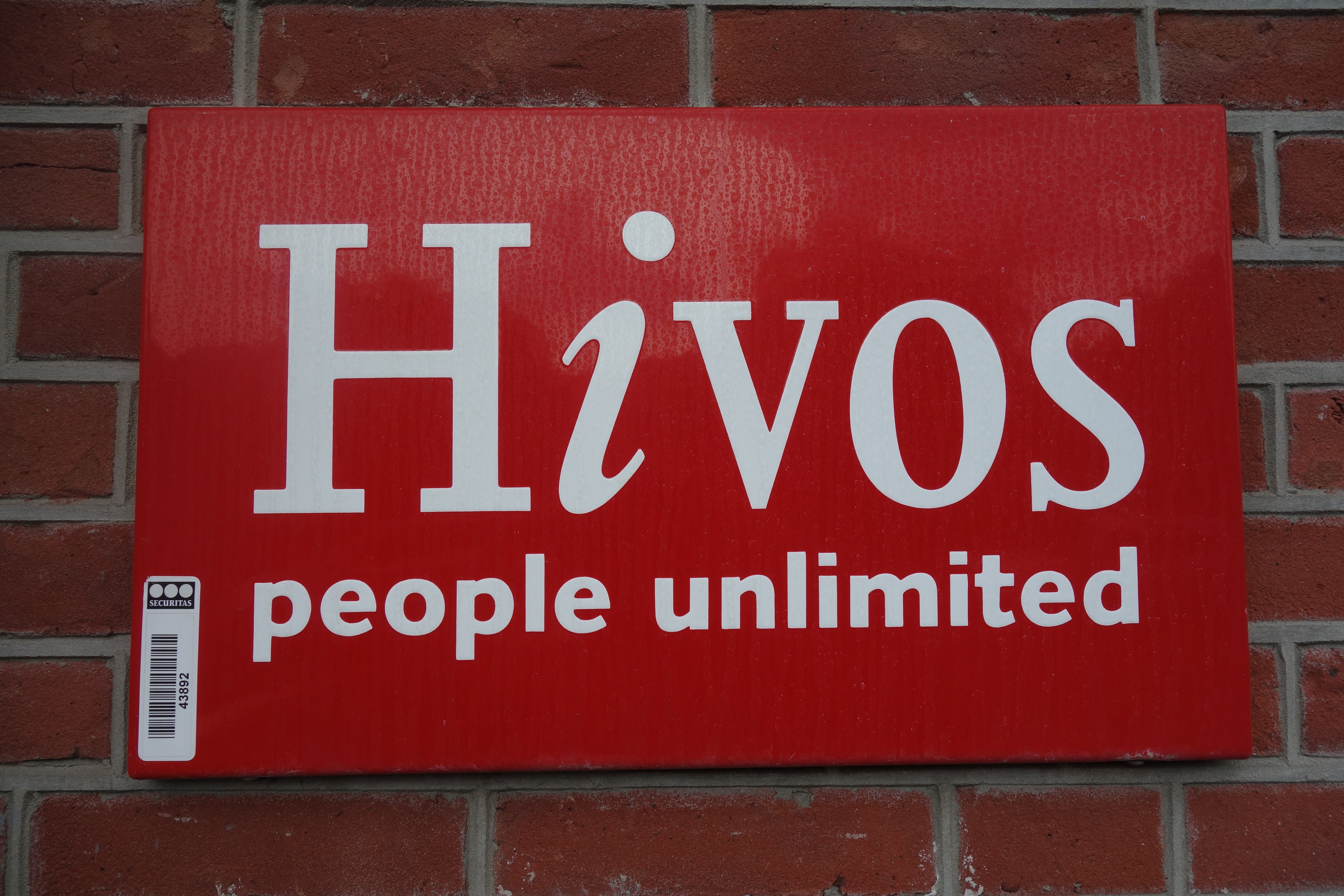
- Founded: January 5, 1968
- Purpose: Free and sustainable world
- Location: The Hague, plus 6 country offices
- Region served: The Americas, Africa, Latin America, Europe, Southwest Asia and North Africa
- Method: Grants, funding, campaigns
- Key people: Marco de Ponte, Chief Executive Officer
- Endowment: 69 million in 2019
- Employees: 289 (excluding Yayasan Humanis) in 2022
- Website: https://hivos.org

Hivos (Dutch: Humanistisch Instituut voor Ontwikkelingssamenwerking, Humanist Institute for Development Cooperation) is a human rights and social justice organization. It supports organizations and movements that address a broad range of human, civil, and political rights in The Americas, Africa, Europe, and Southwest Asia and North Africa (SWANA). It is one of very few INGOs with a distinctly humanist ethos.

== History ==
Hivos emerged out of the organized humanist movement in the decades following the establishment of Humanists International in Amsterdam in 1952, as a culmination of Dutch humanists' growing desire to have a meaningful social impact through international development. Thus, Hivos was founded in 1968 by the Dutch Humanist Association, the Association and Humanitas Weezenkas. The founders held the conviction that development work should be secular, as true cooperation presumes respect for differing beliefs. In the first ever brochure, the founders wrote that “necessary changes should spring from communities themselves – from people at the base of society.” These convictions are still reflected in Hivos its work.

In the 1980s and 1990s, Hivos was one of the first major Dutch NGOs that opened offices in the Global South to operate in the close vicinity of its civil society partners, beneficiaries and other stakeholders there.

== Aim ==
Hivos works with partners, rightsholders, and allies to ensure civil society actors and movements can bring about and shape equitable, just, and inclusive societies.

== Focus ==
Hivos prioritizes the civil and political rights of both organized and informal members of civil society, including independent media and cultural actors, community organizations, and human rights defenders. In particular, if they are directly at risk or if they are able, individually or collectively, to inspire popular movements for progressive change. Hivos also works to combat shrinking civic space by creating supportive environments for civil society organizations.

Hivos often uses the economic, social, and/or human rights of excluded groups as an entry point, for example through women’s empowerment and LGBTQI+ rights initiatives.

== Organization ==
=== Location ===
Hivos' Global Office is in The Hague, The Netherlands. Hivos currently works in 40 countries and has offices in Latin America, East Africa, Southern Africa and Southwest Asia and North Africa (SWANA). In 2021, Hivos handed over its Southeast Asia activities to the NGO Yayasan Humanis in Indonesia.

=== Governance ===
As of 2026, Hivos is managed by the Chief Executive Officer Marco De Ponte and a Core Leadership Team that includes the heads of the following departments: Programs; Business Development; External Engagement; Finance & Information Systems; and People & Culture. The supervisory board is chaired by Diana Monissen.
