= Apos =

Apos may refer to:

- Apostrophe, occasionally abbreviated to apos.
- Apos language, of Papua New Guinea
- Apoș, a village in Bârghiș, Romania
- Apoș River, a river in Romania
- APOS Music, a record label
- APOS Theory, a framework for understanding how people learn math
- &apos;, the HTML code for the apostrophe symbol

== See also ==
- Apo (disambiguation)
- Aphos
- Apus (disambiguation)
