= Apo =

Apo or APO may refer to:

== People, figures, characters ==
- Acting Pilot Officer, the lowest commissioned grade in the Royal Air Force
- Apo, along with Datu, one of the traditional Philippine titles of nobility; meaning "elder"
- Apo, a god of mountains in Inca mythology

=== Persons ===
- Abdullah Öcalan (born 1949), a founding member of Kurdistan Workers' Party (PKK)
- Apo Avedissian (born 1990), Armenian-American artist

== Places ==
- Apache Point Observatory, an observatory in the Sacramento Mountains in Sunspot, New Mexico, United States
- Apo-eup, an administrative division (eup) in Gimcheon, Gyeongsangbuk-do, central South Korea
- Apo Island, a volcanic island in the Philippines
- Apo (island), a coral reef island in the Philippines
- Lake Apo is a crater lake in Barangay Guinoyoran in the city of Valencia in Bukidnon province in the Philippines
- Karaš River or Apo, a tributary of the Danube in the Banat region of Serbia and Romania
- Mount Apo, a stratovolcano on the island of Mindanao in the Philippines
- Antonio Roldán Betancourt Airport IATA code, Apartadó, Columbia

== Music ==
- ABS-CBN Philharmonic Orchestra
- Aldworth Philharmonic Orchestra, the orchestra of Reading Blue Coat School
- APO Hiking Society, a Filipino singing group
- Armenian Philharmonic Orchestra
- Auckland Philharmonia Orchestra

== Businesses and organizations ==
- African People's Organisation, a political organization for Coloured people in early twentieth century South Africa
- Alpha Phi Omega, a U.S. service fraternity
- Alpha Psi Omega, a U.S. honors theatre society
- Analysis & Policy Observatory (APO) (formerly Australian Policy Online), a digital library of policy and practice resources
- Apotex, Canadian pharmaceutical company, producer of generic drugs
- Association for Professional Observers, an association of fisheries observers
- Außerparlamentarische Opposition, a political protest movement in West Germany during the 1960s and 1970s

== Other ==
- Acute pulmonary oedema, fluid accumulation on the lungs
- Apo (drink), an alcoholic beverage of Northeast India
- Apochromat, a type of photographic or other lens
- Apoprotein (disambiguation), a protein without its bound cofactor
- Audio Processing Object
- Army Post Office: chiefly U.S. Army and U.S. Air Force postal facilities
- Authorized Personnel Only, a fictional black ops unit on Alias
- Alternative Public Offering

== See also ==
- Apolipoprotein, lipid-binding protein
- AP0 (disambiguation)
- APU (disambiguation)
