= Apoo =

Apoo may refer to:

- Apolipoprotein O
- Apoo festival, Ghana
- Scratchmen Apoo, a character in One-Piece

== See also ==
- Apu (disambiguation)
