= Apu, Azerbaijan =

Apu, Azerbaijan may refer to:

- Aşağı Apu, Azerbaijan
- Yuxarı Apu, Azerbaijan
