= Manir (state constituency) =

Political subdivision in Malaysia

Manir (N22)
Terengganu constituency

State constituency
- Legislature: Terengganu State Legislative Assembly
MLA
Hilmi Harun
PN
- Constituency created: 1973
- First contested: 1974
- Last contested: 2023

Demographics
- Electors (2023): 20,639

N22 Manir within Terengganu, as used for the 2023 state election

Manir is a state constituency in Terengganu, Malaysia, that has been represented in the Terengganu State Legislative Assembly.

The state constituency was first contested in 1974 and is mandated to return a single Assemblyman to the Terengganu State Legislative Assembly under the first-past-the-post voting system.

== Demographics ==
Ethnic breakdown of Manir's electorate as of 2018
1. Malay (99.5%)
2. Chinese (0.34%)
3. Other ethnicities (0.16%)
4. Indian (0.03%)

== History ==
=== Polling districts ===
According to the Gazette issued on 30 March 2018, the Manir constituency has a total of 7 polling districts.

State Constituency	Polling Districts	Code	Location
Manir (N22)	Kedai Manir	038/22/01	SK Manir
Manir (N22)	Beladau Kolam	038/22/02	SK Beladau Kolam
Manir (N22)	Durian Emas	038/22/03	SK Durian Mas
Manir (N22)	Pulau Bahagia	038/22/04	SK Pulau Bahagia
Manir (N22)	Pujuk	038/22/05	SMK Belara
Manir (N22)	Batu Hampar	038/22/06	SK Pulau Manis
Manir (N22)	Teluk Menara	038/22/07	SK Teluk Menara

=== Representation history ===
Members of the Legislative Assembly for Manir
Assembly	No	Years	Member	Party
Constituency created from Langkap, Jeram, Bukit Besar and Kuala Trengganu Tengah
4th	N15	1974–1978	Ismail Yusof	BN (UMNO)
5th	N15	1978–1982	Ismail Yusof	BN (UMNO)
6th	N15	1982–1986	Harun Taib	PAS
7th	N22	1986–1990	Awang Abu Bakar Sulong	BN (UMNO)
8th	N22	1990–1995	Harun Taib	PAS
9th	N22	1995–1999	Harun Taib	PAS
10th	N22	1999–2004	Harun Taib	PAS
11th	N22	2004–2008	Harun Taib	PAS
12th	N22	2008–2013	Harun Taib	PR (PAS)
13th	N22	2013–2018	Hilmi Harun	PR (PAS)
14th	N22	2018–2020	Hilmi Harun	PAS
14th	N22	2020–2023	Hilmi Harun	PN (PAS)
15th	N22	2023–present	Hilmi Harun	PN (PAS)

== Election results ==
Terengganu state election, 2023
Party	Candidate	Votes	%	∆%
PAS	Hilmi Harun	13,471	85.90	▲27.83
PH	Eka Lisut	2,211	14.10	▲14.10
Total valid votes		15,682	100.00	
Total rejected Ballots		172		
Unreturned Ballots		19		
Turnout		15,873	76.91	▼11.15
Registered electors		20,639		
Majority		11,260	71.80	▲52.85
PAS hold		Swing		

Terengganu state election, 2018
Party	Candidate	Votes	%	∆%
PAS	Hilmi Harun	8,716	58.07	▲5.83
BN	Yusof Awang Hitam	5,872	39.12	▼8.65
PKR	Mohd Hafizuddin Hussain	422	2.81	▲2.81
Total valid votes		15,010	100.00	
Total rejected Ballots		124		
Unreturned Ballots		47		
Turnout		15,181	88.06	▼3.10
Registered electors		17,239		
Majority		2,844	18.95	▲14.48
PAS hold		Swing		

Terengganu state election, 2013
Party	Candidate	Votes	%	∆%
PAS	Hilmi Harun	6,873	52.23	▲0.25
BN	Yusof Awang Hitam	6,285	47.77	▼0.25
Total valid votes		13,158	100.00	
Total rejected Ballots		159		
Unreturned Ballots		26		
Turnout		13,343	91.16	▲2.32
Registered electors		14,637		
Majority		588	4.47	▲0.50
PAS hold		Swing		

Terengganu state election, 2008
Party	Candidate	Votes	%	∆%
PAS	Harun Taib	5,323	51.98	▲0.18
BN	Wan Sagar Wan Embong	4,917	48.02	▼0.18
Total valid votes		10,240	100.00	
Total rejected Ballots		99		
Unreturned Ballots		17		
Turnout		10,356	88.84	▼0.50
Registered electors		11,657		
Majority		406	3.96	▲0.36
PAS hold		Swing		

Terengganu state election, 2004
Party	Candidate	Votes	%	∆%
PAS	Harun Taib	4,451	51.80	▼9.47
BN	Wan Sagar Wan Embong	4,141	48.20	▲9.47
Total valid votes		8,592	100.00	
Total rejected Ballots		66		
Unreturned Ballots		3		
Turnout		8,661	89.33	▲5.37
Registered electors		9,695		
Majority		310	3.61	▼18.94
PAS hold		Swing		

Terengganu state election, 1999
Party	Candidate	Votes	%	∆%
PAS	Harun Taib	5,207	61.27	▲8.94
BN	Shamsuddin Sulong	3,291	38.73	▼8.94
Total valid votes		8,498	100.00	
Total rejected Ballots		212		
Unreturned Ballots		15		
Turnout		8,725	83.97	▲0.54
Registered electors		10,391		
Majority		1,916	22.55	▲17.88
PAS gain from APU		Swing		-

Terengganu state election, 1995
Party	Candidate	Votes	%	∆%
PAS	Harun Taib	4,091	52.33	▼0.60
BN	Shamsuddin Sulong	3,726	47.67	▲0.60
Total valid votes		7,817	100.00	
Total rejected Ballots		153		
Unreturned Ballots		10		
Turnout		7,980	83.43	▼2.16
Registered electors		9,565		
Majority		365	4.67	▼1.21
PAS hold		Swing		

Terengganu state election, 1990
Party	Candidate	Votes	%	∆%
PAS	Harun Taib	3,810	52.94	▲3.88
BN	Awang Abu Pan-Malaysian Islamic Partykar Sulong	3,387	47.06	▼3.88
Total valid votes		7,197	100.00	
Total rejected Ballots		193		
Unreturned Ballots		6		
Turnout		7,396	85.59	▲2.20
Registered electors		8,641		
Majority		423	5.88	▲3.99
PAS gain from BN		Swing		-

Terengganu state election, 1986
Party	Candidate	Votes	%	∆%
BN	Awang Abu Pan-Malaysian Islamic Partykar Sulong	2,918	50.94	▲7.29
PAS	Harun Taib	2,810	49.06	▼7.29
Total valid votes		5,728	100.00	
Total rejected Ballots		206		
Unreturned Ballots		0		
Turnout		5,934	83.39	▲2.97
Registered electors		7,116		
Majority		108	1.89	▼10.82
BN gain from PAS		Swing		-

Terengganu state election, 1982
Party	Candidate	Votes	%	∆%
PAS	Harun Taib	4,134	56.35	▲8.31
BN	Sulaiman @ Jamaluddin Jusoh	3,202	43.65	▼8.31
Total valid votes		7,336	100.00	
Total rejected Ballots		174		
Unreturned Ballots		0		
Turnout		7,510	80.42	▲4.23
Registered electors		9,338		
Majority		932	12.70	▲8.78
PAS gain from BN		Swing		-

Terengganu state election, 1978
Party	Candidate	Votes	%	∆%
BN	Ismail Yusof	3,112	51.96	▼4.68
PAS	Harun Taib	2,877	48.04	▲48.04
Total valid votes		5,989	100.00	
Total rejected Ballots		115		
Unreturned Ballots		0		
Turnout		6,104	76.20	▲2.77
Registered electors		8,011		
Majority		235	3.92	▼9.35
BN hold		Swing		

Terengganu state election, 1974
Party	Candidate	Votes	%
BN	Ismail Yusof	2,837	56.64
Parti Sosialis Rakyat Malaysia	Ramli Embong	2,172	43.36
Total valid votes		5,009	100.00
Total rejected Ballots		269	
Unreturned Ballots		0	
Turnout		5,278	73.43
Registered electors		7,188	
Majority		665	13.28
This was a new constituency created.
