= Constructivism (philosophy of education) =

Theory of knowledge

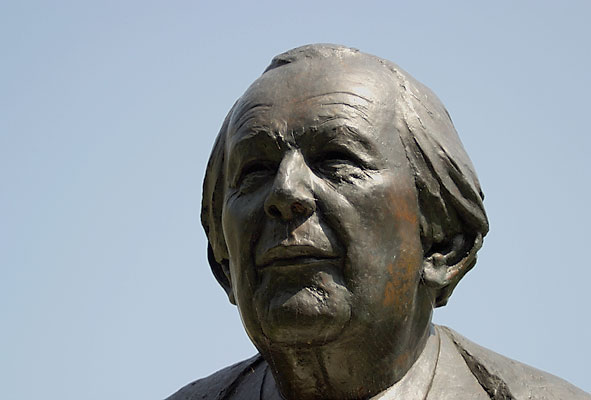
Jean Piaget constructed the theory of cognitive development, which describes how children represent and reason about the world.

Constructivism is a theory that suggests that learners do not passively acquire knowledge through direct instruction. Instead, they construct their understanding through experiences and social interaction, integrating new information with their existing knowledge. This theory originates from Swiss developmental psychologist Jean Piaget's theory of cognitive development.

== Background ==
Constructivism in education is rooted in epistemology, a theory of knowledge concerned with the logical categories of knowledge and its justification. It acknowledges that learners bring prior knowledge and experiences shaped by their social and cultural environment and that learning is a process of students "constructing" knowledge based on their experiences. While behaviorism focuses on understanding what students are doing, constructivism emphasizes the importance of understanding what students are thinking and how to enrich their thinking.

Constructivism in educational psychology can be attributed to the work of Jean Piaget (1896–1980) and his theory of cognitive development. Piaget's focus was on how humans make meaning by integrating experiences with ideas, emphasizing human development as distinct from external influences Another influential figure, Lev Vygotsky (1896–1934), emphasized the importance of sociocultural learning in his theory of social constructivism, highlighting how interactions with adults, peers, and cognitive tools contribute to the formation of mental constructs. Building upon Vygotsky's work, Jerome Bruner and other educational psychologists introduced the concept of instructional scaffolding, where the learning environment provides support that is gradually removed as learners internalize the knowledge.

Views more focused on human development within the social sphere include the sociocultural or socio-historical perspective of Lev Vygotsky and the situated cognition perspectives of Mikhail Bakhtin, Jean Lave, and Etienne Wenger. Additionally, the works of Brown, Collins, and Duguid, as well as Newman, Griffin, Cole, and Barbara Rogoff.

The concept of constructivism has impacted a number of disciplines, including psychology, sociology, education, and the history of science. In its early stages, constructivism focused on the relationship between human experiences and their reflexes or behavior patterns. Piaget referred to these systems of knowledge as "schemes."

Piaget's theory of constructivist learning has significantly influenced learning theories and teaching methods in education. It serves as a foundational concept in education reform movements within cognitive science and neuroscience.

== Overview ==
The formalization of constructivism from a within-the-human perspective is commonly credited to Jean Piaget. Piaget described the mechanisms by which information from the environment and ideas from the individual interact to form internalized structures developed by learners. He identified processes of assimilation and accommodation as crucial in this interaction, as individuals construct new knowledge from their experiences.

When individuals assimilate new information, they integrate it into their existing framework without altering that framework. This can happen when their experiences align with their internal view of the world, but it can also occur if they fail to update a flawed understanding. Accommodation is the process of adjusting one's mental representation of the external world to fit new experiences. It can be understood as the mechanism by which failure leads to learning.

Constructivism is not a specific pedagogy, but a theory explaining how learning occurs, regardless of the learning environment. However, constructivism is often associated with pedagogic approaches that promote active learning, or learning by doing. While there is much enthusiasm for constructivism as a design strategy, some experts believe that it is more of a philosophical framework than a theory that can precisely describe instruction or prescribe design strategies.

== Constructivist pedagogy ==
=== Nature of the learner ===
Social constructivism recognizes and embraces the individuality and complexity of each learner, actively encouraging, and rewarding it as a vital component of the learning process.

==== Background and culture ====
Social constructivism, also known as socioculturalism, emphasizes the role of an individual's background, culture, and worldview in shaping their understanding of truth. According to this theory, learners inherit historical developments and symbol systems from their culture and continue to learn and develop these throughout their lives. This approach highlights the significance of a learner's social interactions with knowledgeable members of society. It suggests that without such interactions, it is challenging to grasp the social meaning of important symbol systems and learn how to effectively use them. Social constructivism also points out that young children develop their thinking abilities through interactions with peers, adults, and the physical world. Therefore, it is essential to consider the learner's background and culture throughout the learning process, as these factors help shape the knowledge and truth that the learner acquires.

==== Motivation and responsibility for learning ====
Social constructivism emphasizes the importance of the student being actively involved in the learning process, unlike previous educational viewpoints where the responsibility rested with the instructor to teach and where the learner played a passive, receptive role. Von Glasersfeld (1989) emphasized that learners construct their own understanding and that they do not simply mirror and reflect what they read. Learners look for meaning and will try to find regularity and order in the events of the world even in the absence of full or complete information.

When considering students' learning, it is essential to take into account their motivation and confidence. According to Von Glasersfeld, a student's motivation to learn is strongly influenced by their belief in their potential for learning This belief is shaped by their past experiences of successfully mastering problems, which is more influential than external acknowledgment and motivation. This idea aligns with Vygotsky's concept of the "zone of proximal development," where students are challenged at a level slightly above their current development. By successfully completing challenging tasks, students build confidence and motivation to take on even more complex challenges.

According to a study on the impact that COVID-19 had on the learning process in Australian University students, a student's motivation and confidence depends on self-determination theory. This theory requires support from the educational environment to fulfill three basic needs to achieve growth, including autonomy, relatedness, and competency. During the historical event of COVID-19, the basic needs were hindered in some way, along with environments that were meant to foster education and growth, which was hindered through the change from traditional in-person classes to online classes that left students with significantly less opportunities for social interactive and active learning opportunities.

=== Role of the instructor ===
==== Instructors as facilitators ====
According to the social constructivist approach, instructors are expected to adapt to the role of facilitators rather than traditional teachers. While a teacher gives a didactic lecture that covers the subject matter, a facilitator assists the student in developing their own understanding of the content. This shift in roles places the focus on the student's active involvement in the learning process, as opposed to the instructor and the content itself.

As a result, a facilitator requires a different set of skills compared to a teacher. For instance, a teacher imparts information, whereas a facilitator encourages questions; a teacher leads from the front, while a facilitator provides support from the background; and a teacher delivers answers based on a set curriculum, whereas a facilitator offers guidance and creates an environment for the learner to form their own conclusions. Furthermore, a teacher typically engages in a monologue, whereas a facilitator maintains an ongoing dialogue with the learners.

Additionally, a facilitator should be able to dynamically adapt the learning experience by taking the lead in guiding the experience to align with the learners' interests and needs in order to create value.

The learning environment should be created in a way that both supports and challenges the student's thinking While it is advocated to give the student ownership of the problem and solution process, it is not the case that any and all activities or solutions are adequate. The critical goal is to support the student in developing effective thinking skills.

==== Relationship between instructor and students ====
In the social constructivist viewpoint, the role of the facilitator involves both the instructor and the students being actively engaged in learning from each other. This dynamic interaction requires that the instructor's culture, values, and background play a significant part in shaping the learning experience. Students compare their own thoughts with those of the instructor and their peers, leading to the development of a new, socially validated understanding of the subject matter. The task or problem serves as the interface between the instructor and the student, creating a dynamic interaction. As a result, both students and instructors need to develop an awareness of each other's viewpoints and consider their own beliefs, standards, and values, making the learning experience both subjective and objective at the same time.

Several studies highlight the significance of mentoring in the learning process. The social constructivist model underscores the importance of the relationship between the student and the instructor in facilitating learning.

Interactive learning can be facilitated through various approaches such as reciprocal teaching, peer collaboration, cognitive apprenticeship, problem-based instruction, anchored instruction, and other methods that involve collaborative learning.

=== Learning is an active process ===
Social constructivism, which is strongly influenced by Vygotsky's work, proposes that knowledge is initially built within a social setting and is then taken in by individuals. According to social constructivists, the act of sharing individual viewpoints, known as collaborative elaboration, leads to learners jointly constructing understanding that would not be achievable on their own.

Social constructivist scholars view learning as an active process in which students are encouraged to discover principles, concepts, and facts independently. Therefore, it is crucial to promote speculation and intuitive thinking in students.

According to other constructivist scholars, individuals create meanings through their interactions with each other and the environment they inhabit. Knowledge is created by people and is shaped by social and cultural influences. McMahon (1997) also emphasizes the social nature of learning, stating that it is not solely a mental process or a result of external factors shaping behavior. Instead, meaningful learning occurs when individuals participate in social activities.

According to Vygotsky (1978), an important aspect of intellectual development is the convergence of speech and practical activity. He emphasized that as children engage in practical activities, they construct meaning on an individual level, and through speech, they connect this meaning to their culture and the interpersonal world they share with others.

==== Collaboration among learners ====
Another tenet of social constructivism is that collaboration among individuals with diverse skills and backgrounds is essential for developing a comprehensive understanding of a particular subject or field.

In some social constructivist models, there is an emphasis on the importance of collaboration among learners, which contrasts with traditional competitive approaches. One concept from Vygotsky that is particularly relevant to peer collaboration is the zone of proximal development. This is defined as the gap between a learner's actual developmental level, determined by independent problem-solving, and the level of potential development, determined through problem-solving under adult guidance or in collaboration with more capable peers. It differs from Piaget's fixed biological stages of development. Through a process called "scaffolding," a learner can be extended beyond the limitations of physical maturation, allowing the development process to catch up to the learning process.

When students present and teach new material to their peers, it fosters a non-linear process of collective knowledge construction.

==== Importance of context ====
The social constructivist paradigm emphasizes that the environment in which learning takes place plays a crucial role in the learning process.

The concept of the learner as an active processor is based on the idea that there are no universal learning laws that apply to all domains. When individuals possess decontextualized knowledge, they may struggle to apply their understanding to real-world tasks. This is due to the lack of engagement with the concept in its complex, real-world environment, as well as the absence of experience with the intricate interrelationships that influence the application of the concept.

One concept within social constructivism is authentic or situated learning, which involves students participating in activities directly related to the practical application of their learning within a culture similar to the real-world setting. Cognitive apprenticeship is a suggested effective model of constructivist learning that aims to immerse students in authentic practices through activity and social interaction, similar to the successful methods used in craft apprenticeship.^{[}

Holt and Willard-Holt (2000) highlight the concept of dynamic assessment, which offers a distinct approach to evaluating learners compared to traditional tests. Dynamic assessment extends the interactive nature of learning to the assessment process, emphasizing interaction between the assessor and the learner. It involves a dialogue between the assessor and the learner to understand the current performance level on a task and explore ways to improve future performance. This approach views assessment and learning as interconnected processes, rather than separate entities.

According to this viewpoint, instructors should approach assessment as an ongoing and interactive process that evaluates the learner's achievements, the quality of the learning experience, and course materials. The feedback generated by the assessment process is crucial for driving further development.

=== Selection, scope, and sequencing of subject matter ===
The organization of knowledge should prioritize integration over division into separate subjects or compartments. This again emphasizes the significance of presenting learning within a specific context. The world in which learners operate is not divided into separate subjects but rather comprises a complex array of facts, problems, dimensions, and perceptions.

==== Engaging and challenging the student ====
Students benefit from being challenged with tasks that require them to apply skills and knowledge slightly beyond their current level of mastery. This approach can help to maintain their motivation and build on past achievements to boost their confidence. This is in line with Vygotsky's zone of proximal development, which refers to the gap between a person's current level of ability and their potential level of development under the guidance of adults or more capable peers.

Vygotsky (1978) argued that effective instruction should be slightly ahead of a learner's current developmental stage. By doing so, instruction can stimulate the development of a range of functions that are in the learner's zone of proximal development. This highlights the crucial role of instruction in fostering development. In other words, Vygotsky’s constructivist learning theory highlights the central role of social interaction and guided learning in cognitive development.

According to Vygotsky, meaningful learning occurs within the zone of proximal development (ZPD)—the range between what a learner can accomplish independently and what they can achieve with the guidance of a more knowledgeable peer or instructor. This framework emphasizes the significance of learning environments that foster collaboration, dialogue, and the exchange of diverse perspectives. By engaging in socially mediated activities, learners actively construct knowledge and deepen their understanding through shared experiences. In practice, Vygotsky’s constructivism underscores the value of scaffolding, where teachers provide structured support that gradually diminishes as students gain competence, allowing them to reach their full cognitive potential.

In order to effectively engage and challenge students, it is important that the tasks and learning environment mirror the complexity of the real-world environment in which the students are expected to operate upon completing their education. Students should not only take ownership of the learning and problem-solving process but also take ownership of the problems themselves.

When it comes to organizing subject matter, the constructivist perspective suggests that the fundamental principles of any subject can be taught to anyone at any point, in some capacity. This approach entails introducing the foundational concepts that makeup topics or subject areas initially and then consistently revisiting and expanding on these ideas.

Instructors should recognize that while they are given a set curriculum to follow, they inevitably personalize it to reflect their own beliefs, thoughts, and emotions about the subject matter and their students. As a result, the learning experience becomes a collaborative effort, influenced by the emotions and life experiences of all involved. It's important to consider the student's motivation as central to the learning process.

==== Structuredness of the learning process ====
Incorporating an appropriate balance between structure and flexibility into the learning process is essential. According to Savery (1994), a highly structured learning environment may pose challenges for learners in constructing meaning based on their existing conceptual understandings. A facilitator should strive to provide adequate structure to offer clear guidance and parameters for achieving learning objectives, while also allowing for an open and flexible learning experience that enables learners to discover, interact, and arrive at their own understanding of truth.

=== Teaching techniques ===
A few strategies for cooperative learning include:

- Reciprocal questioning: students work together to ask and answer questions
- Jigsaw: students become "experts" on one part of a group project and teach it to the others in their group
- Structured controversies: Students work together to research a particular controversy

The "Harkness" discussion method is named after Edward Harkness, who funded its development at Phillips Exeter Academy in the 1930s. This method involves students sitting in a circle, guiding their own discussion. The teacher's role is minimized, with the students initiating, directing, and focusing the discussion. They work together as a team, sharing responsibility and goals. The ultimate aim is to illuminate the subject, interpret different viewpoints, and piece together a comprehensive understanding. Discussion skills are crucial, and every participant is expected to contribute to keeping the discussion engaging and productive.

== Criticism ==
Many cognitive psychologists and educators have raised concerns about the core principles of constructivism, arguing that these theories may be misleading or inconsistent with well-established findings.

In neo-Piagetian theories of cognitive development, it is proposed that learning is influenced by the processing and representational resources available at a particular age. This implies that if the demands of a concept to be learned exceed the available processing efficiency and working memory resources, then the concept is considered unlearnable. This approach to learning can impact the understanding of essential theoretical concepts and reasoning. Therefore, for effective learning to occur, a child must operate in an environment that aligns with their developmental and individual learning constraints, taking into account any deviations from the norm for their age. If this condition is not met, the learning process may not progress as intended.

Many educators have raised concerns about the effectiveness of this approach to instructional design, particularly when it comes to creating instruction for beginners. While some proponents of constructivism claim that "learning by doing" improves learning, critics argue that there is insufficient empirical evidence to support this assertion, especially for novice learners. Sweller and his colleagues argue that novices do not possess the underlying mental models, or "schemas" necessary for "learning by doing". Additionally, Mayer (2004) conducted a review of the literature and concluded that fifty years of empirical data do not support the use of pure discovery as a constructivist teaching technique. In situations requiring discovery, he recommends the use of guided discovery instead.

Some researchers, such as Kirschner et al. (2006), have characterized the constructivist teaching methods as "unguided methods of instruction" and have suggested more structured learning activities for learners with little to no prior knowledge. Slezak has expressed skepticism about constructivism, describing it as "fashionable but thoroughly problematic doctrines that can have little benefit for practical pedagogy or teacher education." Similar views have been stated by Meyer, Boden, Quale and others.

Kirschner et al. grouped several learning theories together, including discovery, problem-based, experiential, and inquiry-based learning, and suggested that highly scaffolded constructivist methods such as problem-based learning and inquiry learning may be ineffective. They described several research studies that were favorable to problem-based learning given learners were provided some level of guidance and support.

=== Confusion with maturationism ===
Many people confuse constructivism with maturationism. The constructivist (or cognitive-developmental) stream "is based on the idea that the dialectic or interactionist process of development and learning through the student's active construction should be facilitated and promoted by adults". The romantic maturationist stream emphasizes the natural development of students without adult interventions in a permissive environment. In contrast, constructivism involves adults actively guiding learning while allowing children to take charge of their own learning process.

== Subtypes ==
=== Contextual constructivism ===
According to William Cobern (1991) Contextual constructivism is "about understanding the fundamental, culturally based beliefs that both students and teachers bring to class, and how these beliefs are supported by culture. Contextual constructivists not only raise new research questions, they also call for a new research paradigm. The focus on contextualization means that qualitative, especially ethnographic, techniques are to be preferred" (p. 3).

=== Radical constructivism ===
Ernst von Glasersfeld developed radical constructivism by coupling Piaget's theory of learning and philosophical viewpoint about the nature of knowledge with Kant's rejection of an objective reality independent of human perception or reason. Radical constructivism does not view knowledge as an attempt to generate ideas that match an independent, objective reality. Instead, theories and knowledge about the world, as generated by our senses and reason, either fit within the constraints of whatever reality may exist and, thus, are viable or do not and are not viable. As a theory of education, radical constructivism emphasizes the experiences of the learner, differences between learners and the importance of uncertainty.

=== Relational constructivism ===
Björn Kraus' relational constructivism can be perceived as a relational consequence of radical constructivism. In contrast to social constructivism, it picks up the epistemological threads and maintains the radical constructivist idea that humans cannot overcome their limited conditions of reception. Despite the subjectivity of human constructions of reality, relational constructivism focuses on the relational conditions that apply to human perceptional processes.

=== Social constructivism ===
In recent decades, constructivist theorists have extended the traditional focus on individual learning to address collaborative and social dimensions of learning. It is possible to see social constructivism as a bringing together of aspects of the work of Piaget with that of Bruner and Vygotsky. For example, Bruner identified three key principles of constructivism theory that include (1) Instruction must address the experiences and contexts that make the learner willing and capable of learning (learner readiness);(2), Instruction must be structured for easy comprehension by the student (structured teaching), and (3) Instruction should be designed to facilitate extrapolation and/or fill in the gaps beyond the information provided. Here, Bruner built the bridge between Piaget's theory, that focuses on the early intellectual development of children that results from their engagement with the environment, and with Vygotsyk's theory on sociocultural learning. Together Piaget, Bruner, and Vygotsky implement social constructivism theories.

=== Communal constructivism ===
The concept communal constructivism was developed by Leask and Younie, in 1995, through their research on the European SchoolNet, which demonstrated the value of experts collaborating to push the boundaries of knowledge, including communal construction of new knowledge between experts, rather than the social construction of knowledge, as described by Vygotsky, where there is a learner to teacher scaffolding relationship. "Communal constructivism,” as a concept, applies to those situations in which there is currently no expert knowledge or research to underpin knowledge in an area. "Communal constructivism" refers, specifically, to the process of experts working together to create, record, and publish new knowledge in emerging areas. In the seminal European SchoolNet research where, for the first time, academics were testing out how the internet could support classroom practice and pedagogy, experts from a number of countries set up test situations to generate and understand new possibilities for educational practice.

Bryan Holmes, in 2001, applied this to student learning, as described in an early paper, "in this model, students will not simply pass through a course like water through a sieve but instead leave their own imprint in the learning process."

== Influence on computer science and robotics ==
Constructivism has influenced the course of programming and computer science. Some famous programming languages have been created, either wholly or in part, for educational use, to support the constructionist theory of Seymour Papert. These languages have been dynamically typed and reflective. Logo and its successor, Scratch, are the best known of them. Constructivism has also informed the design of interactive machine learning systems, whereas radical constructivism has been explored as a paradigm to design experiments in rehabilitation robotics and more precisely in prosthetics.

== List of notable constructivists ==
Writers who influenced constructivism include:

- Jerome Bruner (1915–2016)
- John Dewey (1859–1952)
- Heinz von Foerster (1911–2002)
- Paulo Freire (1921–1997)
- Ernst von Glasersfeld (1917–2010)
- George Kelly (1905–1967)
- Maria Montessori (1870–1952)
- Jean Piaget (1896–1980)
- Herbert Simon (1916–2001)
- Władysław Strzemiński (1893–1952)
- Edgar Morin (1921–2026)
- Humberto Maturana (1928–2021)
- Lev Vygotsky (1896–1934)
- Paul Watzlawick (1921–2007)

== See also ==
- APOS Theory (Actions, Processes, Objects, Schemas)
- Autodidactism
- Connectivism
- Constructivist epistemology
- Constructivist teaching methods
- Critical pedagogy
- Cultural-historical activity theory (CHAT)
- Educational psychology
- Learning styles
- Philosophy of education
- Reform mathematics
- Situated cognition
- Socratic method
- Teaching for social justice
- Vocational education
