= Elemental Motor Company =

British car manufacturer

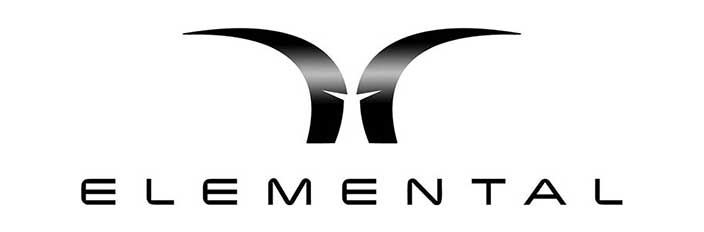
- Company type: Private company
- Industry: Automotive
- Founded: 28 November 2012
- Founder: John Begley; Mark Fowler
- Headquarters: Hampshire, United Kingdom
- Key people: John Begley; Mark Fowler; Guy Colborne; Jeremy Curnow
- Products: Elemental rp1
- Number of employees: 8
- Website: www.elementalcars.co.uk

Elemental Motor Company is a British low-volume performance motor vehicle manufacturing company that produces the Elemental RP1, a road-legal two seater sports car. The company is based in Hampshire, United Kingdom.

== Background ==
Elemental Motor Company was founded in 2012 by John Begley, a former McLaren Formula 1 engineer with experience in BTCC race cars, and Mark Fowler, a former McLaren F1 Aerodynamics Engineer.

The company's first car, the Elemental RP1 (or Race Project One) was introduced as a prototype at the Goodwood Festival of Speed in 2014. A re-engineered, production-ready model was presented at the same hill climb event in 2016. The first customer cars were delivered in 2017.

Elemental Motor Company also operates as a design and engineering consultancy, producing the AP-0 EV show car for technology partner Apex Motors in 2020.

In 2021, Elemental announced the development of the RP1 EV, a BEV variant of the RP1, in collaboration with Apex.

== Products ==
=== Elemental RP1 ===
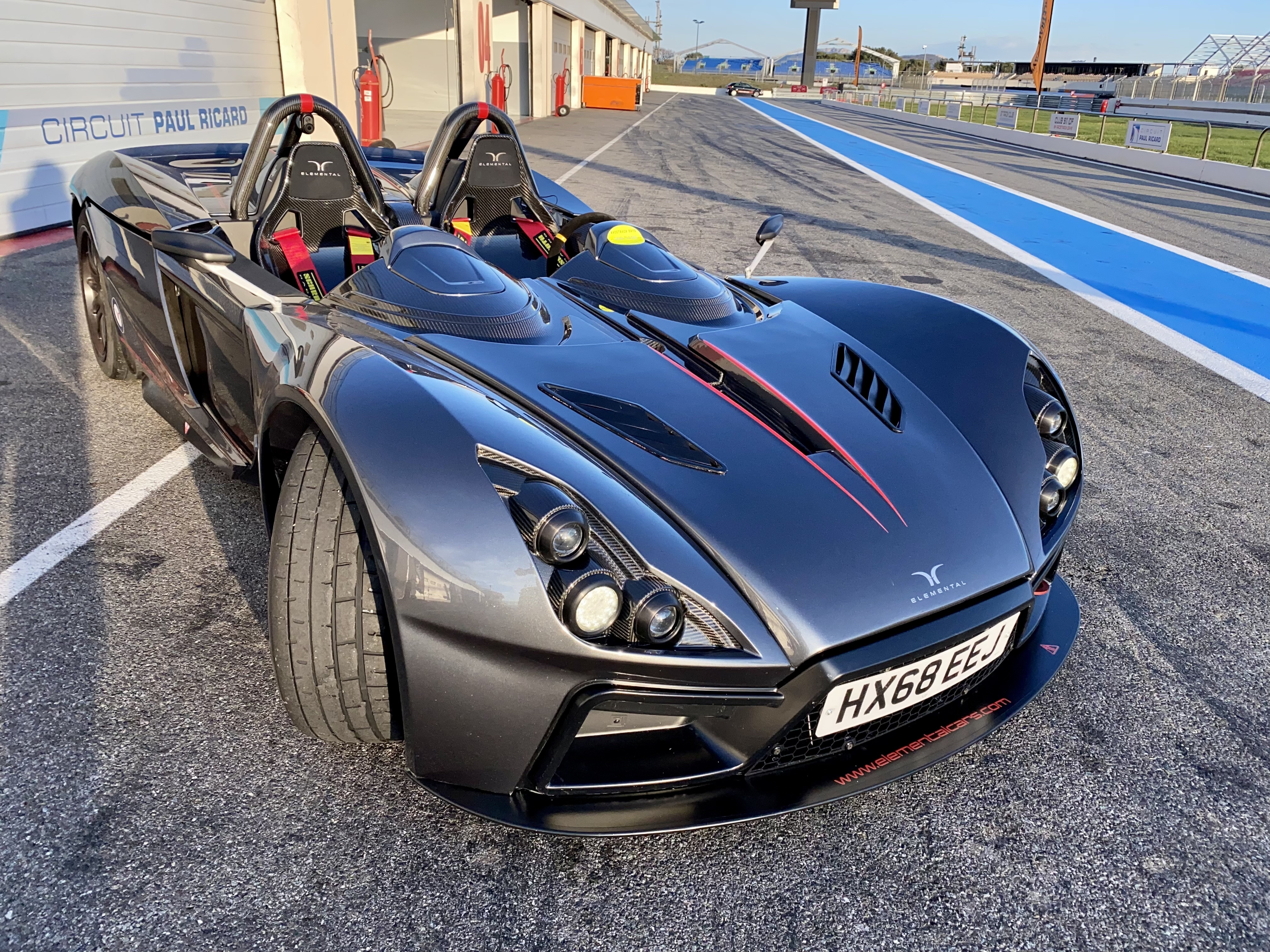
Elemental RP1 at Circuit Paul Ricard

The RP1 is a lightweight, open-top, road-legal sports car produced by Elemental. It was first revealed as a prototype at the Goodwood Festival of Speed in 2014 and a re-engineered production-ready model was presented in 2016.

The original RP1 was powered by a longitudinally mounted 2.0l Ford EcoBoost engine, paired with a semi stressed six-speed sequential Hewland gearbox. Weighing 620 kg with 320 bhp, it had a power-to-weight ratio of 516 bhp/ton. Later 2.3l engine variants with 375 bhp had a power-to-weight ratio of 604 bhp/ton. The car accelerates to 60 mph in 2.7 seconds and has a top speed of 170 mph. It features a carbon fibre tub that weighs 68 kg and meets FIA racing standards. The car has steel subframes at both ends, allowing for easy replacement. It has double wishbone suspension and inboard Nitron dampers at the front and rear.

The Elemental RP1 has a weight distribution of 47/53 front to rear. It features a paddle shifting, pneumatic actuated gearbox controlled by the ECU. The vehicle offers up to 400 kg of downforce at 150 mph, thanks to deep diffusers at the front and rear. The driving position is feet-up, similar to a single-seat racecar, which enhances the aerodynamics with front and rear diffusers. Later variants of the RP1 use the 2.3l Ford Ecoboost engine with a revised output of 375 bhp producing 500 kg of downforce at 150 mph. In collaboration with ex-McLaren Formula 1 aerodynamicist Mark Taylor, the RP1 underwent enhancements to its bodywork using computational fluid dynamics, resulting in an increase in downforce to 1000 kg at 150 mph.

The car was reviewed by Autocar in 2015 and deliveries started in 2017.

Endurance racer David Pittard worked with Elemental as a test and development driver before returning to pro racing in 2017.

In October 2023, the Elemental RP1 became an option on the Xbox 2021 racing game Forza Horizons 5.

== See also ==
- List of car manufacturers of the United Kingdom
- Automotive industry in the United Kingdom
