= Appu =

Appu is a common nickname in India for the feminine given names Apurva, Apeksha, Aparna, Aparijita. It is also a masculine nickname, but prevalent mostly in the southern region of India.

It may also refer to:

- Appu (Hurrian), a character in Hurrian mythology
- Appu, an Indian elephant, mascot of the 1982 Asian Games in Delhi

== Films ==
- Appu (1990 film), an Indian Malayalam film by Dennis Joseph
- Appu (2000 film), an Indian Tamil-language film by Vasanth
- Appu (2002 film), an Indian Kannada-language film by Puri Jagannath

== Persons ==
- Appu Nedungadi (1863–1933), India writer in Malayalam
- Appu Kuttan (born 1941), Indian-American philanthropist, consultant, and author
- Puran Appu (1812–1848), Sri Lankan independence activist
- P. S. Appu (1929–2012), Indian civil servant
- Puneeth Rajkumar, (1975–2021), Indian actor, colloquially known as Appu

== See also ==
- Apu (disambiguation)
- Appu Chesi Pappu Koodu, a 1958 Indian Telugu-language film
- Asian-Pacific Postal Union (APPU), an International organisation
- Asian-Pacific Parliamentarian's Union (APPU), an International organisation
- Appukutty (born 1984), Indian actor and comedian
