= Cognitive Emotional Pedagogy =

Teaching and learning technique

Cognitive Emotional Pedagogy (CEP) is a method of teaching and learning based on cognitive psychology and constructivist learning theory which claims that construction and retention of new concepts and skills is most effective if the learning content is associated with creativity and emotionally distinct experiences. The theoretical framework was created by Joni Mäkivirta.

== Theoretical Framework ==
- Conceptual extension happens when new concepts are so closely linked to the existing knowledge that the overall conceptual structure and logical connections can be retained. Conceptual extension is associated with linear logical processes.
- Conceptual rearrangement happens when new concepts are sufficiently dissimilar in terms ‘shape’ and ‘behavior’ to the existing concepts that their assimilation requires existing knowledge to be rearranged. Conceptual rearrangement is associated with lateral logical processes.
- Paradigmatic structuring happens when new concepts are so dissimilar in terms of ‘shape’ and ‘behavior’ to the existing knowledge that their assimilation to existing knowledge fails. The acquisition of new concepts is possible only if the conceptual map is rebuilt. Paradigmatic structuring is associated with creative theorizing that challenges existing assumptions.

Mäkivirta claims that traditional education is creativity-deprived because it focuses on conceptual extension and rearrangement, but not on paradigmatic structuring, even though the latter has been responsible for paradigm shifts that have created the greatest progress in human knowledge.

According to the theory all three types of learning happen at all ages, but the greatest amount of paradigmatic structuring takes place in the early childhood. Traditional schooling is criticized for destroying the ability to learn paradigmatically by conditioning students to believe that the teacher is the only source of reliable knowledge and using assessment as a 'cognitive control tool'. This practice is particularly detrimental if assessment tasks are inappropriate for the students' level of cognitive maturity.

According to Mäkivirta the 'fact fetish' and the overemphasis of mathematical and linguistic operations at expense of emotional engagement and concept discovery lead to deprived and biased thinking and prevent development of fully functioning intellect.

Mäkivirta suggests that more effective and transformative learning can be achieved if the learning content is delivered using Cognitive Emotional Pedagogy (CEP) that combines creative emotional experiences with learning tasks. To create a learning environment that supports CEP, schools should align their pedagogical practices and learning cultures with the principles of CEP.

=== Principles of CEP ===
- Teachers are concept assimilation and creativity facilitators
- Learners are knowledge creators
- Pedagogy should support knowledge creation by fostering conceptual manipulation skills, providing relevant emotional experiences and promoting sharing of created knowledge
- Curriculum should be based on assimilation of concepts and logical operations typical of various ‘areas of knowledge’ and provide learner-specific educational plans
- Assessment should be based on expressed guidelines and should credit concept creation, creativity, emotional expression and conceptual manipulation skills
- Learning culture should be defined by positivity, openness and tolerance for ambiguity
- Self-evaluation should be used to create meta-cognition regarding aspects of the learning process

=== Teacher Training ===
Teacher training based on CEP principles is available by some educational consultancies. Teacher training focuses on topics such as rediscovering creativity; constructive verbal and non-verbal communication; CEP in lesson and unit planning; CEP pedagogy in different learning contexts; and building of creative and positive learning communities.
