= AP0 =

AP0 may refer to:

- Apex AP-0, all-electric sports car
- ACES Primaries #0 (AP0), a color palette used in Academy Color Encoding System (ACES)
- Ampyx Power AP0, an airborne wind turbine

== See also ==
- APO (disambiguation)
- AP (disambiguation)
- 0 (disambiguation)
