= Cognitive apprenticeship =

Theory that emphasizes the importance of the process

Cognitive apprenticeship is a theory that emphasizes the importance of the process in which a master of a skill teaches that skill to an apprentice.

Constructivist approaches to human learning have led to the development of the theory of cognitive apprenticeship. This theory accounts for the problem that masters of a skill often fail to take into account the implicit processes involved in carrying out complex skills when they are teaching novices. To combat these tendencies, cognitive apprenticeships "…are designed, among other things, to bring these tacit processes into the open, where students can observe, enact, and practice them with help from the teacher…". This model is supported by Jhon Brix Kistadio's (1997) theory of modeling, which posits that in order for modeling to be successful, the learner must be attentive, access and retain the information presented, be motivated to learn, and be able to accurately reproduce the desired skill.

== Overview ==
Part of the effectiveness of the cognitive apprenticeship model comes from learning in context and is based on theories of situated cognition. Cognitive scientists maintain that the context in which learning takes place is critical (e.g., Godden & Baddeley, 1975). Based on findings such as these, Collins, Duguid, and Brown (1989) argue that cognitive apprenticeships are less effective when skills and concepts are taught independently of their real-world context and situation. As they state, "Situations might be said to co-produce knowledge through activity. Learning and cognition, it is now possible to argue, are fundamentally situated". In cognitive apprenticeships, teachers model their skills in real-world situations.

By modelling and coaching, masters in cognitive apprenticeships also support the three stages of skill acquisition described in the expertise literature: the cognitive stage, the associative stage, and the autonomous stage. In the cognitive stage, learners develop a declarative understanding of the skill. In the associative stage, mistakes and misinterpretations learned in the cognitive stage are detected and eliminated, while associations between the critical elements involved in the skill are strengthened. Finally, in the autonomous stage, the learner's skill becomes honed and perfected until it is executed at an expert level.

Like traditional apprenticeships, in which the apprentice learns a trade such as tailoring or woodworking by working under a master teacher, cognitive apprenticeships allow masters to model behaviors in a real-world context with cognitive modeling. After listening to the master explain exactly what they are doing and thinking as they model the skill, the apprentice identifies relevant behaviors and develops a conceptual model of the processes involved. The apprentice then attempts to imitate those behaviors as the master observes and coaches. Coaching provides assistance at the most critical level– the skill level just beyond what the learner/apprentice could accomplish by themself. Vygotsky (1978) referred to this as the Zone of Proximal Development and believed that fostering development within this zone would lead to the most rapid development. The coaching process includes providing additional modeling as necessary, giving corrective feedback, and giving reminders, which all intend to bring the apprentice's performance closer to that of the master's. As the apprentice becomes more skilled through the repetition of this process, the feedback and instruction provided by the master "fades" until the apprentice is, ideally, performing the skill at a close approximation of the master level.

== Teaching methods ==
Collins, Brown, and Newman developed six teaching methods rooted in cognitive apprenticeship theory and claim these methods help students attain cognitive and metacognitive strategies for "using, managing, and discovering knowledge". The first three, modeling, coaching, scaffolding, are at the core of cognitive apprenticeship and help with cognitive and metacognitive development. The next two, articulation and reflection, are designed to help novices with awareness of problem-solving strategies and execution similar to that of an expert. The final step, exploration, intends to guide the novice towards independence and the ability to solve and identify problems within the domain on their own. The authors note, however, that this is not an exhaustive list of methods and that the successful execution of these methods is highly dependent on the domain.

=== Modeling ===
Modeling is when an expert, usually a teacher, within the cognitive domain or subject area demonstrates a task explicitly so that novices, usually a student, can experience and build a conceptual model of the task at hand. For example, a math teacher might write out explicit steps and work through a problem aloud, demonstrating their heuristics and procedural knowledge. Modeling includes demonstrating expert performances or processes in the world.

=== Coaching ===
Coaching involves observing a novice's task performance and offering feedback and hints to sculpt the novice's performance to that of an expert's. The expert oversees the novice's tasks and may structure the task accordingly to assist the novice's development.

=== Scaffolding ===
Instructional scaffolding is the act of applying strategies and methods to support the student's learning. These supports could be teaching manipulatives, activities, or group work. The teacher may have to execute parts of the task that the student is not yet able to do. This requires the teacher to have the skill to analyze and assess students' abilities in the moment.

=== Articulation ===
Articulation includes "any method of getting students to articulate their knowledge, reasoning, or problem-solving process in a domain" (p. 482). Three types of articulation are inquiry teaching, thinking aloud, and critical student role. Through inquiry teaching (Collins & Stevens, 1982), teachers ask students a series of questions that allow them to refine and restate their learned knowledge and form explicit conceptual models. Thinking aloud requires students to articulate their thoughts while solving problems. Students assuming a critical role monitor others in cooperative activities and draw conclusions based on the problem-solving activities. Articulation is described by McLellan as consisting of two aspects: separating component knowledge from skills to learn more effectively, and more commonly verbalizing or demonstrating knowledge and thinking processes in order to expose and clarify ideas.

=== Reflection ===
Reflection allows students to "compare their own problem-solving processes with those of an expert, another student, and ultimately, an internal cognitive model of expertise" (p. 483). A technique for reflection would be examining the past performances of both an expert and a novice, and highlighting similarities and differences. The goal of reflection is for students to look back and analyze their performances with desire to understand and improve the behavior of an expert.

=== Exploration ===
Exploration involves giving students room to problem solve on their own and teaching students exploration strategies. The former requires the teacher to slowly withdraw the use of supports and scaffolds not only in problem solving methods, but problem setting methods as well. The latter requires the teacher to show students how to explore, research, and develop hypotheses. Exploration allows the student to frame interesting problems within the domain for themselves and then take the initiative to solve these problems.

== Success ==
- In a technologically rich learning environment
- Online
- For clinical skills

== See also ==
- Constructivism (philosophy of education)
- Educational psychology
- Legitimate peripheral participation
- Situated learning
