= Rəzvan =

- Location within Azerbaijan
- Coordinates: 38°40′N 48°42′E
- Country: Azerbaijan
- Rayon: Lankaran
- Municipality: Daştatük
- Time zone: UTC+4 (AZT)
  - Summer (DST): UTC+5 (AZT)

Rəzvan (also, Rezvan and Razvayn) is a village in the Lankaran Rayon of Azerbaijan. The village forms part of the municipality of Daştatük.
