= Situated cognition =

Hypothesis that knowing is inseparable from doing

Situated cognition is a theory that posits that knowing is inseparable from doing by arguing that all knowledge is situated in activity bound to social, cultural and physical contexts.

Situativity theorists suggest a model of knowledge and learning that requires thinking on the fly rather than the storage and retrieval of conceptual knowledge. In essence, cognition cannot be separated from the context. Instead, knowing exists in situ, inseparable from context, activity, people, culture, and language. Therefore, learning is seen in terms of an individual's increasingly effective performance across situations rather than in terms of an accumulation of knowledge, since what is known is co-determined by the agent and the context.

== History ==
While situated cognition gained recognition in the field of educational psychology in the late twentieth century, it shares many principles with older fields such as critical theory, anthropology (Jean Lave & Etienne Wenger, 1991), philosophy (Martin Heidegger, 1968), critical discourse analysis (Fairclough, 1989), and sociolinguistics theories (Bakhtin, 1981) that rejected the notion of truly objective knowledge and the principles of Kantian empiricism.

Lucy Suchman's work on situated action at Xerox Labs was instrumental in popularizing the idea that an actor's understanding of how to perform work results from reflecting on interactions with the social and material (e.g. technology-mediated) situation in which she or he acts. More recent perspectives of situated cognition have focused on and draw from the concept of identity formation as people negotiate meaning through interactions within communities of practice. Situated cognition perspectives have been adopted in education, instructional design, online communities and artificial intelligence (see Brooks, Clancey). Grounded Cognition, concerned with the role of simulations and embodiment in cognition, encompasses Cognitive Linguistics, Situated Action, Simulation and Social Simulation theories. Research has contributed to the understanding of embodied language, memory, and the representation of knowledge.

Situated cognition draws a variety of perspectives, from an anthropological study of human behavior in the context of technology-mediated work, or within communities of practice to the ecological psychology of the perception-action cycle and intentional dynamics, and even research on robotics with work on autonomous agents at NASA and elsewhere (e.g., work by W. J. Clancey). Early attempts to define situated cognition focused on contrasting the emerging theory with information processing theories dominant in cognitive psychology.

Recently theorists have recognized a natural affinity between situated cognition, New Literacy Studies and new literacies research (Gee, 2010). This connection is made by understanding that situated cognition maintains that individuals learn through experiences. It could be stated that these experiences, and more importantly the mediators that affect attention during these experiences is affected by the tools, technologies and languages used by a socio-cultural group and the meanings given to these by the collective group. New literacies research examines the context and contingencies of language and tool use by individuals and how this changes as the Internet and other communication technologies affect literacy.

== Glossary ==
| Term | Definition |
|---|---|
| affordance | properties of the environment, specified in the information array (flow field) of the individual, that present possibilities for action and are available for an agent to perceive directly and act upon |
| attention and intention | Once an intention (goal) is adopted, the agent's perception (attention) is attuned to the affordances of the environment. |
| attunement | attunement is a persisting state of awareness of the affordances in the environment and how they may be acted upon |
| community of practice | The concept of a community of practice (often abbreviated as CoP) refers to the process of social learning that occurs and shared sociocultural practices that emerge and evolve when people who have common goals interact as they strive towards those goals. |
| detection of invariants | perception of what doesn't change across different situations |
| direct perception (pick up) | describes the way an agent in an environment senses affordances without the need for computation or symbolic representation |
| effectivities | The agent's ability to recognize and use affordances of the environment. |
| embodiment | as an explanation of cognition emphasizes first that the body exists as part of the world. In a dynamic process, perception and action occurring through and because of the body being in the world interact to allow for the processes of simulation and representation. |
| legitimate peripheral participation | the initial stage(s) of a person's active membership in a community of practice to which he or she has access and the opportunity to become a full participant. |
| perceiving and acting cycle | Gibson (1986) described a continuous perception-action cycle, which is dynamic and ongoing. Agents perceive and act with intentionality in the environment at all times. |

== Key principles ==
=== Affordances/effectivities ===
James J. Gibson introduced the idea of affordances as part of a relational account of perception. Perception should not be considered solely as the encoding of environmental features into the perceiver's mind, but as an element of an individual's interaction with her environment (Gibson, 1977). Central to his proposal of an ecological psychology was the notion of affordances. Gibson proposed that in any interaction between an agent and the environment, inherent conditions or qualities of the environment allow the agent to perform certain actions with the environment. He defined the term as properties in the environment that presented possibilities for action and were available for an agent to perceive directly and act upon. Gibson focused on the affordances of physical objects, such as doorknobs and chairs, and suggested that these affordances were directly perceived by an individual instead of mediated by mental representations such as mental models. Gibson's notion of direct perception as an unmediated process of noticing, perceiving, and encoding specific attributes from the environment has long been challenged by proponents of a more category-based model of perception.

This focus on agent-situation interactions in ecological psychology was consistent with the situated cognition program of researchers such as James G. Greeno (1994, 1998), who appreciated Gibson's apparent rejection of the factoring assumptions underlying experimental psychology. The situated cognition perspective focused on "perception-action instead of memory and retrieval…A perceiving/acting agent is coupled with a developing/adapting environment and what matters is how the two interact". Greeno (1994) also suggested that affordances are "preconditions for activity," and that while they do not determine behavior, they increase the likelihood that a certain action or behavior will occur.

Shaw, Turvey, & Mace (as cited by Greeno, 1994) later introduced the term effectivities, the abilities of the agent that determined what the agent could do, and consequently, the interaction that could take place. Perception and action were co-determined by the effectivities and affordances, which acted 'in the moment' together. Therefore, the agent directly perceived and interacted with the environment, determining what affordances could be picked up, based on his effectivities. This view is consistent with Norman's (1988) theory of "perceived affordances," which emphasizes the agent's perception of an object's utility as opposed to focusing on the object itself.

An interesting question is the relationship between affordances and mental representations as set forth in a more cognitivist perspective. While Greeno (1998) argues that attunements to affordances are superior to constructs such as schemata and mental models, Glenberg & Robertson (1999) suggested that affordances are the building blocks of mental models.

=== Perception (variance/invariance) ===
The work of Gibson (1986) in the field of visual perception greatly influences situated cognition. Gibson argued that visual perception is not a matter of the eye translating inputs into symbolic representation in the brain. Instead the viewer perceives and picks up on the infinite amount of information available in the environment. Specifically, an agent perceives affordances by discovering the variants, what changes, and more importantly the invariants, what does not change across different situations. Given a specific intention (or intentional set), perceptions of invariants are co-determined by the agent and the affordances of the environment, and are then built upon over time.

=== Memory ===
Situated cognition and ecological psychology perspectives emphasize perception and propose that memory plays a significantly diminished role in the learning process. Rather, focus is on the continuous tuning of perceptions and actions across situations based on the affordances of the environment and the interaction of the agent within that environment (Greeno, 1994). Representations are not stored and checked against past knowledge, but are created and interpreted in activity (Clancey, 1990).

Situated cognition understands memory as an interaction with the world, bounded by meaningful situations, that brings an agent toward a specified goal (intention). Thus, perception and action are co-determined by the effectivities and affordances, which act 'in the moment' together. Therefore, the agent directly perceives and interacts with the environment, determining what affordances can be picked up, based on his effectivities, and does not simply recall stored symbolic representations.

=== Knowing ===
Situativity theorists recast knowledge not as an entity, thing, or noun, but as knowing as an action or verb. It is not an entity which can be collected as in knowledge acquisition models. Instead knowing is reciprocally co-determined between the agent and environment. This reciprocal interaction can not be separated from the context and its cultural and historical constructions. Therefore, knowing isn't a matter of arriving at any single truth but instead it is a particular stance that emerges from the agent-environment interaction.

Knowing emerges as individuals develop intentions through goal-directed activities within cultural contexts which may in turn have larger goals and claims of truth. The adoption of intentions relates to the direction of the agent's attention to the detection of affordances in the environment that will lead to accomplishment of desired goals. Knowing is expressed in the agent's ability to act as an increasingly competent participant in a community of practice. As agents participate more fully within specific communities of practice, what constitutes knowing continuously evolves. For example, a novice environmentalist may not look at water quality by examining oxygen levels but may consider the color and smell. Through participation and enculturation within different communities, agents express knowing through action.

=== Learning ===
Since knowing is rooted in action and can not be decontextualized from individual, social, and historical goals teaching approaches that focus on conveying facts and rules separately from the contexts within which they are meaningful in real-life do not allow for learning that is based on the detection of invariants. They are therefore considered to be impoverished methods that are unlikely to lead to transfer. Learning must involve more than the transmission of knowledge but must instead encourage the expression of effectivities and the development of attention and intention through rich contexts that reflect real-life learning processes.

Learning, more specifically literacy learning is affected by the Internet and other communication technologies as also evidenced in other segments of society. As a result of this, youth are recently using affordances provided by these tools to become experts in a variety of domains. These practices by youth are viewed as them becoming "pro-ams" and becoming experts in whatever they have developed a passion for.

=== Language ===
Individuals don't just read or write texts; they interact with them, and often these interactions involve others in various socio-cultural contexts. Since language is often the basis for monitoring and tracking learning gains in comprehension, content knowledge, and tool use in and out of school, the role of situated cognition in language learning activities is important. Membership and interaction in social and cultural groups is often determined by tools, technologies and discourse use for full participation. Language learning or literacy in various social and cultural groups must include how the groups work with and interact with these texts. Language instruction in the context of situated cognition also involves the skilled or novice use of language by members of the group, and instruction of not only the elements of language, but what is needed to bring a student to the level of expert. Originating from emergent literacy, specialist-language lessons examines the formal and informal styles and discourses of language use in socio-cultural contexts. A function of specialist-language lessons includes "lucidly functional language", or complex specialist language is usually accompanied by clear and lucid language used to explain the rules, relationships or meanings existing between language and meaning.

=== Legitimate peripheral participation ===
According to Jean Lave and Wenger (1991) legitimate peripheral participation (LPP) provides a framework to describe how individuals ('newcomers') become part of a community of learners. Legitimate peripheral participation was central to Lave and Wenger's take on situated cognition (referred to as "situated activity") because it introduced socio-cultural and historical realizations of power and access to the way thinking and knowing are legitimated. They stated, "Hegemony over resources for learning and alienation from full participation are inherent in the shaping of the legitimacy and peripherality of participation in its historical realizations" (p. 42). Lave and Wenger's (1991) research on the phenomenon of apprenticeship in communities of practice not only provided a unit of analysis for locating an individual's multiple, changing levels and ways of participation, but also implied that all participants, through increased involvement, have access to, acquire, and use resources available to their particular community.

To illustrate the role of LPP in situated activity, Lave and Wenger (1991) examined five apprenticeship scenarios (Yucatec midwives, Vai and Gola tailors, naval quartermasters, meat cutters, and non-drinking alcoholics involved in AA). Their analysis of apprenticeship across five different communities of learners led them to several conclusions about the situatedness of LPP and its relationship to successful learning. Key to newcomers' success included:

- access to all that community membership entails,
- involvement in productive activity,
- learning the discourse(s) of the community including "talking about and talking within a practice," (p. 109), and
- willingness of the community to capitalize on the inexperience of newcomers, "Insofar as this continual interaction of new perspectives is sanctioned, everyone's participation is legitimately peripheral in some respect. In other words, everyone can to some degree be considered a 'newcomer' to the future of a changing community"

=== Planning vs. action ===
Suchman's book, Plans and Situated Actions: The Problem of Human-machine Communication (1987), provided a novel approach to the study of human-computer interaction (HCI). By adopting an anthropological approach to sensemaking and interpretation, Suchman was able to demonstrate how both action and planning were situated in the context of a flow of socially and materially mediated activities – an idea that stimulated many of the later conceptualizations of situated cognition. Her studies contrasted the deterministic approach to planning assumed by technology designers with the situated nature of planning as people make sense of the status of their workflow and adjust their course of action accordingly. For example, a photocopier will instruct its user to reload all pages in the original order after a jam, whereas the user understands that they only need to copy the last page again. By arguing that plans were the result of ongoing processes of prospective/retrospective sense making, Suchman identified the limits of technology system access to relevant social and material resources as a major cause of limitations in how technology supports human work.

This position led to a major debate with Vera and Simon (1993), who argued that cognition is based on symbolic representations and that planning must therefore be deterministic, based on a pre-determined repertoire of learned responses. Most organizational theorists would now see this debate as reflecting individual/cognitive vs. socially situated levels of analysis (requiring a similar need for paradigmatic co-existence as Wave–particle duality). Suchman (1993) argues that planning in the context of work-activity is similar to navigating a canoe through rapids: you know what point on the river you are aiming for, but you constantly adjust your course as you interact with rocks, swells, and currents on the way. As a result, many organizational theorists argue that plans can only be viewed as post-hoc justifications of action, while Suchman herself appears to view plans and actions as interrelated in the moment of action.

=== Representation, symbols, and schemata ===
In situated theories, the term "representation" refers to external forms in the environment that are created through social interactions to express meaning (language, art, gestures, etc.) and are perceived and acted upon in the first-person sense. "Representing" in the first person sense is conceived as an act of re-experiencing in the imagination that involves the dialectic of ongoing perceiving and acting in coordination with the activation of neural structures and processes. This form of reflective representation is considered to be a secondary type of learning, while the primary form of learning is found in the "adaptive recoordination that occurs with every behavior". Conceptualizing is considered to be a "prelinguistic" act, while "knowing" involves creative interaction with symbols in both their interpretation and use for expression. "Schema" develop as neural connections become biased through repeated activations to reactivate in situations that are perceived and conceived as temporally and compositionally similar to previous generalized situations.

=== Goals, intention, and attention ===
Young-Barab Model (1997)

The Young-Barab Model (1997) pictured to the left, illustrates the dynamics of intentions and intentional dynamics involved in the agent's interaction with his environment when problem solving.

Dynamics of Intentions: goal (intention) adoption from among all possible goals (ontological descent). This describes how the learner decides whether or not to adopt a particular goal when presented with a problem. Once a goal is adopted, the learner proceeds by interacting with their environment through intentional dynamics. There are many levels of intentions, but at the moment of a particular occasion, the agent has just one intention, and that intention constrains his behavior until it is fulfilled or annihilated.

Intentional Dynamics: dynamics that unfold when the agent has only one intention (goal) and begins to act towards it, perceiving and acting. It is a trajectory towards the achievement of a solution or goal, the process of tuning one's perception (attention). Each intention is meaningfully bounded, where the dynamics of that intention inform the agent of whether or not he is getting closer to achieving his goal. If the agent is not getting closer to his goal, he will take corrective action, and then continue forward. This is the agent's intentional dynamics, and continues on until he achieves his goal.

=== Transfer ===
There are various definitions of transfer found within the situated cognition umbrella. Researchers interested in social practice often define transfer as increased participation. Ecological psychology perspectives define transfer as the detection of invariance across different situations. Furthermore, transfer can only "occur when there is a confluence of an individual's goals and objectives, their acquired abilities to act, and a set of affordances for action".

=== Embodied cognition ===
The traditional cognition approach assumes that perception and motor systems are merely peripheral input and output devices. However, embodied cognition posits that the mind and body interact 'on the fly' as a single entity. An example of embodied cognition is seen in the area of robotics, where movements are not based on internal representations, rather, they are based on the robot's direct and immediate interaction with its environment. Additionally, research has shown that embodied facial expressions influence judgments, and arm movements are related to a person's evaluation of a word or concept. In the latter example, the individual would pull or push a lever towards his name at a faster rate for positive words than for negative words. These results appeal to the embodied nature of situated cognition, where knowledge is the achievement of the whole body in its interaction with the world.

== Externalism ==
As to the mind, by and large, situated cognition paves the way to various forms of externalism. The issue is whether the situated aspect of cognition has only a practical value or it is somehow constitutive of cognition and perhaps of consciousness itself. As to the latter possibility, there are different positions. David Chalmers and Andy Clark, who developed the hugely debated model of the extended mind, explicitly rejected the externalization of consciousness. For them, only cognition is extended. On the other hand, others, like Riccardo Manzotti or Teed Rockwell, explicitly considered the possibility of situating conscious experience in the environment.

== Pedagogical implications ==
Since situated cognition views knowing as an action within specific contexts and views direct instruction models of knowledge transmission as impoverished, there are significant implications for pedagogical practices. First, curriculum requires instructional design that draws on apprenticeship models common in real life. Second, curricular design should rely on contextual narratives that situate concepts in practice. Classroom practices such as project-based learning and problem-based learning would qualify as consistent with the situated learning perspective, as would techniques such as Case-Based Learning, Anchored Instruction, and cognitive apprenticeship.

=== Cognitive apprenticeship ===
Cognitive apprenticeships were one of the earliest pedagogical designs to incorporate the theories of situated cognition (Brown, Collins, & Duguid, 1989). Cognitive apprenticeship uses four dimensions (e.g., content, methods, sequence, sociology) to embed learning in activity and make deliberate the use of the social and physical contexts present in the classroom (Brown, Collins, & Duguid, 1989; Collins, Brown, & Newman, 1989). Cognitive apprenticeship includes the enculturation of students into authentic practices through activity and social interaction (Brown, Collins, & Duguid, 1989). The technique draws on the principles of Legitimate Peripheral Participation (Lave & Wenger, 1991) and reciprocal teaching (Palincsar & Brown, 1984; 1989) in that a more knowledgeable other, i.e. a teacher, engages in a task with a more novice other, i.e. a learner, by describing their own thoughts as they work on the task, providing "just in time" scaffolding, modeling expert behaviors, and encouraging reflection. The reflection process includes having students alternate between novice and expert strategies in a problem-solving context, sensitizing them to specifics of an expert performance, and adjustments that may be made to their own performance to get them to the expert level (Collins & Brown, 1988; Collins, Brown, & Newman, 1989). Thus, the function of reflection indicates "co-investigation" and/or abstracted replay by students.

Collins, Brown, and Newman (1989) emphasized six critical features of a cognitive apprenticeship that included observation, coaching, scaffolding, modeling, fading, and reflection. Using these critical features, expert(s) guided students on their journey to acquire the cognitive and metacognitive processes and skills necessary to handle a variety of tasks, in a range of situations Reciprocal teaching, a form of cognitive apprenticeship, involves the modeling and coaching of various comprehension skills as teacher and students take turns in assuming the role of instructor.

=== Anchored instruction ===
Anchored instruction is grounded in a story or narrative that presents a realistic (but fictional) situation and raises an overarching question or problem (compare with an essential question posed by a teacher). This approach is designed to 1) engage the learner with a problem or series of related problems, 2) require the learner to develop goals and discover subgoals related to solving the problem(s), and 3) provide the learner with extensive and diverse opportunities to explore the problem(s) in a shared context with classmates. For example, a Spanish teacher uses a video drama series focused on the murder of a main character. Students work in small groups to summarize parts of the story, to create hypotheses about the murderer and motive, and to create a presentation of their solution to the class. Stories are often paired so that across the set students can detect the invariant structure of the underlying knowledge (so 2 episodes about distance-rate-time, one about boats and one about planes, so students can perceive how the distance-rate-time relationship holds across differences in vehicles). The ideal smallest set of instances needed to provide students the opportunity to detect invariant structure has been referred to as a "generator set" of situations.

The goal of anchored instruction is the engagement of intention and attention. Through authentic tasks across multiple domains, educators present situations that require students to create or adopt meaningful goals (intentions). One of the educator's objectives can be to set a goal through the use of an anchor problem. A classic example of anchored instruction is the Jasper series. The Jasper series includes a variety of videodisc adventures focused on problem formulation and problem solving. Each videodisc used a visual narrative to present an authentic, realistic everyday problem. The objective was for students to adopt specific goals (intentions) after viewing the story and defining a problem. These newly adopted goals guided students through the collaborative process of problem formulation and problem solving.

=== Perceiving and acting in avatar-based virtual worlds ===
Virtual worlds provide unique affordances for embodied learning, i.e., hands-on, interactive, spatially oriented, that ground learning in experience. Here "embodied" means acting in a virtual world enabled by an avatar.

Contextual affordances of online games and virtual environments allow learners to engage in goal-driven activity, authentic interactions, and collaborative problem-solving – all considered in situated theories of learning to be features of optimal learning. In terms of situated assessment, virtual worlds have the advantage of facilitating dynamic feedback that directs the perceiving/acting agent, through an avatar, to continually improve performance.

== Research methodologies ==
The situative perspective is focused on interactive systems in which individuals interact with one another and physical and representational systems. Research takes place in situ and in real-world settings, reflecting assumptions that knowledge is constructed within specific contexts which have specific situational affordances. Mixed methods and qualitative methodologies are the most prominently used by researchers.

In qualitative studies, methods used are varied but the focus is often on increased participation in specific communities of practice, the affordances of the environment that are acted upon by the agent, and the distributed nature of knowing in specific communities. A major feature of quantitative methods used in situated cognition is the absence of outcome measures. Quantitative variables used in mixed methods often focus on process over product. For example, trace nodes, dribble files, and hyperlink pathways are often used to track how students interact in the environment.

== Critiques of situativity ==
In "Situated Action: A Symbolic Interpretation" Vera and Simon wrote: " ... the systems usually regarded as exemplifying Situated Action are thoroughly symbolic (and representational), and, to the extent that they are limited in these respects, have doubtful prospects for extension to complex tasks" Vera and Simon (1993) also claimed that the information processing view is supported by many years of research in which symbol systems simulated "broad areas of human cognition" and that there is no evidence of cognition without representation.

Anderson, Reder and Simon (1996) summarized what they considered to be the four claims of situated learning and argued against each claim from a cognitivist perspective. The claims and their arguments were:

1. Claim: Activity and learning are bound to the specific situations in which they occur. Argument: Whether learning is bound to context or not depends on both the kind of learning and the way that it is learned.
2. Claim: Knowledge does not transfer between tasks. Argument: There is ample evidence of successful transfer between tasks in the literature. Transfer depends on initial practice and the degree to which a successive task has similar cognitive elements to a prior task.
3. Claim: Teaching abstractions is ineffective. Argument: Abstract instruction can be made effective by combining abstract concepts and concrete examples.
4. Claim: Instruction must happen in complex social contexts. Argument: Research shows value in individual learning and in focusing individually on specific skills in a skill set.

Anderson, Reder and Simons summarize their concerns when they say: "What is needed to improve learning and teaching is to continue to deepen our research into the circumstances that determine when narrower or broader contexts are required and when attention to narrower or broader skills are optimal for effective and efficient learning" (p. 10).

=== Considerations ===
However, it is important to remember that a theory is neither wrong nor right but provides affordances for certain aspects of a problem. Lave and Wenger recognized this in their ironic comment, "How can we purport to be working out a theoretical conception of learning without engaging in the project of abstraction [decontextualized knowledge] rejected above?" (Lave & Wenger, 1991, p. 38).

== See also ==
- Action-specific perception
- Activity theory
- Cognitive biology
- Cognitive psychology
- Computer-supported collaborative learning
- Cultural-historical activity theory (CHAT)
- Distributed cognition
- Dynamical systems models of cognition
- Embodied cognition
- Extended cognition
- Enactivism
- Group cognition
- Pragmatism
- Situational awareness

== Citations and further reading ==
- Anderson, John R.; Greeno, James G.; Reder, Lynne M.; Simon, Herbert A. (2000). "Perspectives on learning, thinking, and activity". Educational Researcher. 29 (4): 11–13. doi:10.3102/0013189x029004011. JSTOR 1176453. (Preprint doi:10.1184/R1/6617582).
- Anderson, C. (2006). The long tail: Why the future of business is selling less of more. New York: Hyperion.
- Brown, Ann L. (1992). "Design experiments: Theoretical and methodological challenges in creating in complex interventions in classroom settings" (PDF). Journal of the Learning Sciences. 2 (2): 141–178. doi:10.1207/s15327809jls0202_2. JSTOR 1466837.
- Clancey, William J. (1997). Situated cognition: On Human Knowledge and Computer Representation. New York: Cambridge University Press. ISBN 978-0-521-44871-0.
- "Special Issue: Situated Action". Cognitive Science. 17 (1). January–March 1993.
- Collins, Allan; Brown, John Seely (1988). "The computer as a tool for learning through reflection". In Lesgold, H. Mandi & A. (ed.). Learning issues for intelligent tutoring systems (pp. 1–18). : Springer-Verlag.
- Mandl, Heinz; Lesgold, Alan (eds.). Learning issues for intelligent tutoring systems. New York: Springer. ISBN 978-1-4684-6350-7.
- Collins, Allan; Brown, John Seely; Newman, Susan E. (1989). "Cognitive apprenticeship: Teaching the crafts of reading, writing and mathematics" (PDF). In Resnick, Lauren B. (ed.). Knowing, learning, and instruction: Essays in honor of Robert Glaser. Hillsdale, New Jersey: Lawrence Erlbaum Associates. pp. 453–494. doi:10.4324/9781315044408-14. ISBN 978-0-8058-0068-5. ERIC ED284181.
- Dewey, John (1963) [1938]. Experience and education. New York City: Collier Books.
- Dickinson, D. K., & Neuman, S. B. (Eds.). (2006). Handbook of Early Literacy Research, Vol. 2. New York: Guilford Press.
- Gallagher, S.; Robbins, B.D.; Bradatan, C. (2007). "Special issue on the situated body". Janus Head: Journal of Interdisciplinary Studies in Literature, Continental Philosophy, Phenomenological Psychology, and the Arts. 9 (2). Amherst, New York: Trivium Publications.
- Gee, J. P. (2004). Situated Language and learning: A critique of traditional schooling. London: Routledge.
- Gee, J. P. (2007). Good video games and good learning: Collected essays on video games, learning, and literacy. New York: Lang.
- Gee, J. P. (2010). A Situated-Sociocultural Approach to Literacy and Technology. In E. Baker (Ed.), The New Literacies: Multiple Perspectives on Research and Practice, pp. 165–193. New York: Guilford Press.
- Greeno, James G. (1994). "Gibson's affordances". Psychological Review. 101 (2): 336–342. doi:10.1037/0033-295X.101.2.336. hdl:20.500.12749/3070. PMID 8022965.
- Greeno, James G. (1997). "On claims that answer the wrong question". Educational Researcher. 26 (1): 5–17. doi:10.3102/0013189X026001005. JSTOR 1176867.
- Greeno, James G.; Middle School, Mathematics Through Applications Project Group (1998). "The situativity of knowing, learning, and research". American Psychologist. 53 (1): 5–26. Bibcode:1998AmPsy..53....5G. doi:10.1037/0003-066X.53.1.5.
- Greeno, James G. (2006). "Authoritative, accountable positioning and connected, general knowing: Progressive themes in understanding transfer". Journal of the Learning Sciences. 15 (4): 539–550. doi:10.1207/s15327809jls1504_4. JSTOR 25473533.
- Griffin, M. M. (1995). "You can't get there from here: Situated learning, transfer, and map skills". Contemporary Educational Psychology. 20: 65–87. doi:10.1006/ceps.1995.1004.
- Hutchins, E. (1995). Cognition in the Wild. A Bradford Book. Cambridge, Massachusetts: The MIT Press. ISBN 978-0-262-58146-2.
- Keller, C. & Keller, J. (1996). Cognition and Tool Use: The Blacksmith at Work. Cambridge University Press (ISBN 0-521-55239-7)
- Kirshner, D. & Whitson, J. A. (1997) Situated Cognition: Social, semiotic, and psychological perspectives. Mahwah, New Jersey: Erlbaum (ISBN 0-8058-2038-8)
- Kirshner, D.; Whitson, J. A. (1998). "Obstacles to understanding cognition as situated" (PDF). Educational Researcher. 27 (8): 22–28. doi:10.3102/0013189X027008022. JSTOR 1177113.
- Lave, J. (1988). Cognition in Practice. Cambridge University Press. ISBN 978-0-521-35015-0.
- Lave, J.; Wenger, E. (1991). Situated learning: Legitimate peripheral participation. Cambridge, UK: Cambridge University Press. ISBN 978-0-521-42374-8.
- Leadbeater, C., & Miller, P. (2004). The Pro-Am revolution: How enthusiasts are changing our society and economy. London: Demos.
- Leu, Donald J.; O'Byrne, W. Ian; Zawilinski, Lisa; McVerry, J. Greg; Everett-Cacopardo, Heidi (2009). "Expanding the new literacies conversation" (PDF). Educational Researcher. 39 (4): 264–269. doi:10.3102/0013189X09336676. JSTOR 20532542.
- Scardamalia, M., & Bereiter, C. (1983). Child as co-investigator: Helping children gain insight into their own mental processes. In S. Paris, G. Olson, & H. Stevenson (Eds.), Learning and motivation in the classroom (pp. 83–107). Hillsdale, New Jersey: Lawrence Erlbaum Associates.
- Scardamalia, M., & Bereiter, C. (1985). Fostering the development of self-regulation in children's knowledge processing. In S. F. Chipman, J. W. Segal, & R. Glaser (Eds.), Thinking and learning skills: Research and open questions (pp. 563–577). Hillsdale, New Jersey: Lawrence Erlbaum Associates.
- Scardamalia, M.; Bereiter, C.; Steinbach, R. (1984). "Teachability of reflective processes in written composition". Cognitive Science. 8 (2): 173–190. doi:10.1207/s15516709cog0802_4.
- Suchman, Lucy A. (1987). Plans and situated actions: The problem of human-machine communication. Learning in Doing: Social, Cognitive and Computational Perspectives. New York: Cambridge University Press. ISBN 978-0-521-33739-7.
- Suchman, Lucy A. (January 1993). "Response to Vera and Simon's situated action: A symbolic interpretation" (PDF). Cognitive Science. 17 (1): 71–75. doi:10.1207/s15516709cog1701_5. ISSN 0364-0213.
