= Apus (disambiguation) =

Apus is a constellation.

Apus or APUS may also refer to:

- Apus (bird), a genus of birds
- Lepidurus apus, a species of crustacean in the genus Lepidurus
- APUS (computer), an Amiga computer brand
- AP United States History (AP US), an American college-level course and examination
- American Public University System, an online learning institution

== See also ==
- APU (disambiguation)
