= Apex Motors =

Hong Kong automobile manufacturer

Apex Motors is a Hong Kong and British-based car company founded by Hong Kong/Australian brothers Jason and Gary Leung in 2018 and evolved from the Elemental RP-1.

The company launched in 2019 with a limited production AP-1 open road and track sports car in Hong Kong, powered by a Ford 2.3-litre 400 bhp engine.

In March 2020 it unveiled the Apex AP-0 electric sports car concept, to be built in England from 2022. Production plans fell through, and after a three-year delay, production plans moved in Miami, Florida in 2023.

In March 2023 the company renamed the AP-0 as the Attucks Apex AP0 and announced the involvement of Wyclef Jean. The proposed price had doubled from the 2020 version.

== Models ==
- Apex AP-1 limited production sports car
- Apex AP-0 all-electric concept sports car
