= Apo (island) =

Island in the Philippines

Coordinates: 12.660°N 120.414°E

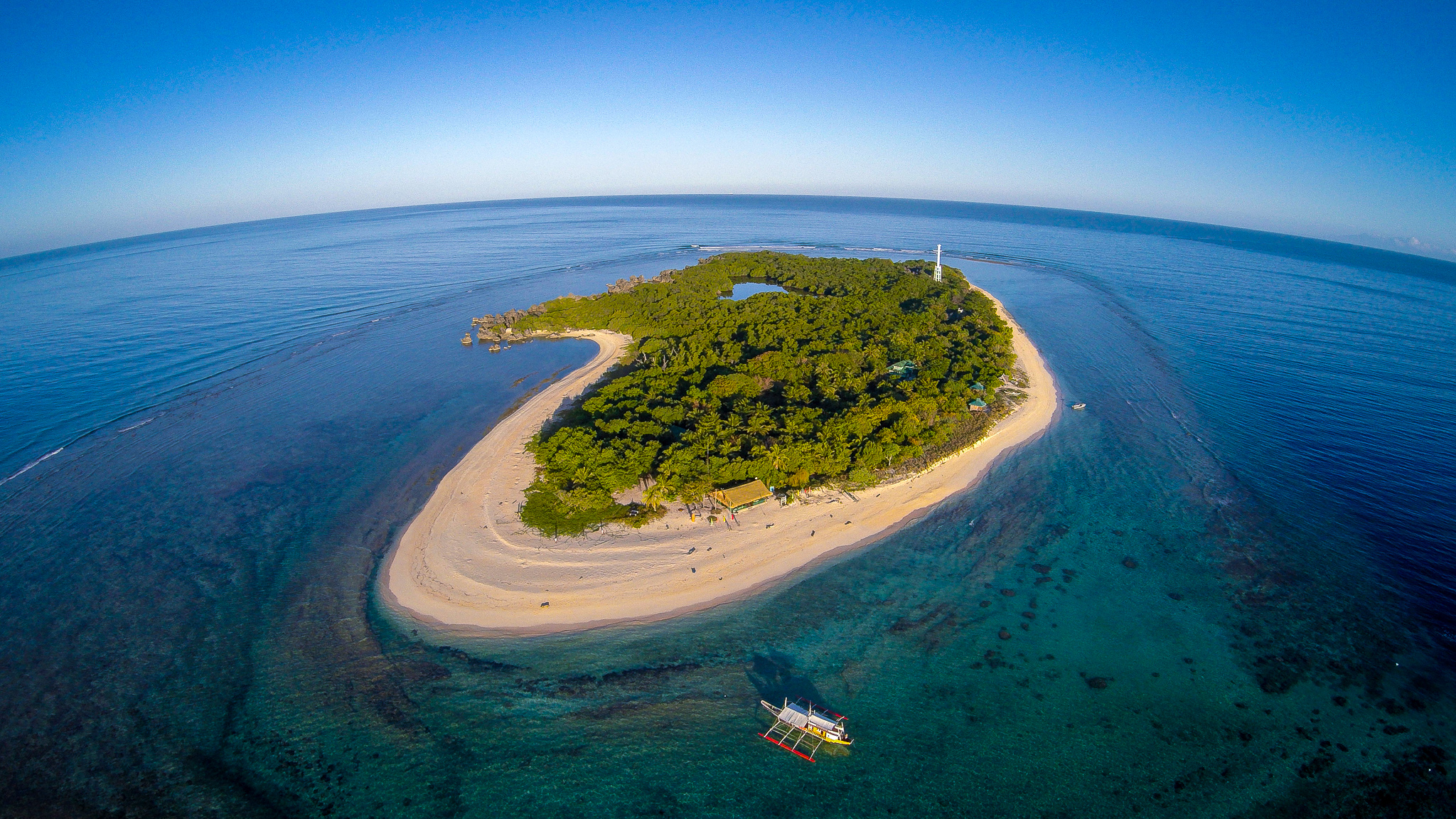
Apo Island of Apo Reef Natural Park

Apo is an island located in the Apo Reef in Occidental Mindoro, Philippines. It is approximately 0.5 miles (0.80 km) in length.

== Apo Reef ==
Apo Reef is a coral reef system in the Philippines situated on the western waters of Occidental Mindoro province in the Mindoro Strait. Encompassing 34 square kilometres (13 sq mi), it is the world's second-largest contiguous coral reef system and the largest in the country. The reef and its surrounding waters are protected areas in the country administered as the Apo Reef Natural Park.

== See also ==
- List of islands of the Philippines
