= Daştatük =

- Municipality
- Location within Azerbaijan
- Coordinates: 38°41′05″N 48°44′59″E
- Country: Azerbaijan
- Rayon: Lankaran

Population
  - Total: 878
- Time zone: UTC+4 (AZT)
  - Summer (DST): UTC+5 (AZT)

Daştatük is a village and municipality in the Lankaran Rayon of Azerbaijan. It has a population of 878. The municipality consists of the villages of Daştatük, Aşağı Apu, and Rəzvan.
