= Association for Professional Observers =

NGO of fisheries observers

The Association for Professional Observers (APO) is an association that monitors fisheries observers. It is the first association of fisheries observers.

== Aim ==
The Association for Professional Observers is a non-governmental organization aiming to support and develop programs of observers that monitor fishing practices on fishing boats, with the aim of supporting marine conservation.

== Monitoring of deaths of observers ==
In January 2022, the APO called for publication of the results of the post mortem into the September 2021 death of observer Arnold Latu on a fishing boat in the waters of Tonga. The APO stated that 12 deaths of fishing boat observers had occurred since 2009 around the world.

== Wider reading ==
- Anon. 2001. Proceedings of the Canada – US Fisheries Observer Program Workshop, June 26–29, 2000, St. John's Newfoundland. U.S. Dep. Commerce, Silver Spring, MD.
- Credle, V. R., D. P. DeMaster, M. M. Merklein, M. B. Hanson, W. A. Karp, and S. M. Fitzgerald. 1994. NMFS Observer Programs: Minutes and Recommendations from a Workshop. NOAA Tech. Memo. NMFS-OPR-94-1, NOAA, Galveston, TX.
- Cornish, V., J. Aloysius Didier, J. Nance, M. Tork, J. Lafargue, M. Toner, T. Turk, B. Donahue, B. Rogers, and E. David Kulka (eds.). 2004. Proceedings of the Third International Fisheries Observer Conference. NOAA Tech. Memo NMFS-F/SPO-64, U.S. Dep. Commerce, Silver Spring, MD.
- MCELDERRY, H., W. A. KARP, J. TWOMEY, M. MERKLEIN, V. CORNISH, and M. SAUNDERS. 1999. Proceedings of the first biennial Canada/U.S. observer program workshop, 113 p. NTIS No. PB99-146482.
- McVea, T. A., and S. J. Kennelly (eds.),. 2005. Proceedings of the 4th International Fisheries Observer Conference, Sydney Australia, November 8–11, 2004. NSW Department of Primary Industries, Cronulla Fisheries Research Centre of Excellence, Cronulla, Australia.
- McVea, T. A., and S. J. Kennelly (eds.),. 2007. Proceedings of the 5th International Fisheries Observer Conference, May 15–18, 2007, Victoria, BC Canada. NSW Department of Primary Industries, Cronulla Fisheries Research Centre of Excellence, Cronulla, Australia.
- MRAG (Marine Resource Assessment Group) Americas. 2000. Independent Review of the North Pacific Groundfish Observer Program. Prepared for NMFS North Pacific Groundfish Observer Program.
