= Apolipoprotein O =

Protein-coding gene in the species Homo sapiens

APOO

Identifiers
- Aliases: APOO, FAM121B, MIC26, Mic23, My025, Apolipoprotein O, MICOS26
- External IDs: OMIM: 300753; MGI: 1915566; GeneCards: APOO

Gene location (Human)
Chr.	X chromosome (human)
Band	Xp22.11	Start	23,833,353 bp
Band	Xp22.11	End	23,907,938 bp

Gene location (Mouse)
Chr.	X chromosome (mouse)
Band	X|X C3	Start	93,410,723 bp
Band	X|X C3	End	93,460,699 bp
RNA expression pattern
Bgee	Human / Mouse (ortholog); Top expressed in: decidua; right ventricle; myocardium of left ventricle; prefrontal cortex; pons; olfactory zone of nasal mucosa; lateral nuclear group of thalamus; triceps brachii muscle; Brodmann area 9; anterior cingulate cortex / Top expressed in: quadriceps femoris muscle; right kidney; muscle of thigh; proximal tubule; muscle tissue; skeletal muscle tissue; heart; secondary oocyte; primary oocyte; zygote; More reference expression data
BioGPS	n/a
Gene ontology
Molecular function	protein binding
Cellular component	high-density lipoprotein particle; extracellular region; mitochondrial inner membrane; endoplasmic reticulum membrane; very-low-density lipoprotein particle; Golgi membrane; Golgi apparatus; membrane; integral component of membrane; integral component of mitochondrial inner membrane; mitochondrion; endoplasmic reticulum; low-density lipoprotein particle; MICOS complex; extracellular space; cytosol
Biological process	lipid transport; cristae formation; transport
Sources:Amigo / QuickGO
Orthologs
Databases	NCBI: entry; OMA: entry
Species	Human	Mouse
Entrez	79135	68316
Ensembl	ENSG00000184831	ENSMUSG00000079508
UniProt	Q9BUR5	Q9DCZ4
RefSeq (mRNA)	NM_024122	NM_001199337; NM_001199338; NM_001199339; NM_026673
RefSeq (protein)	NP_077027	NP_001186266; NP_001186267; NP_001186268; NP_080949
Location (UCSC)	Chr X: 23.83 – 23.91 Mb	Chr X: 93.41 – 93.46 Mb
PubMed search
- Wikidata
View/Edit Human	View/Edit Mouse

ApoO

Identifiers
- Symbol: ApoO
- Pfam: PF09769
- InterPro: IPR019166
Available protein structures:
- PDB: IPR019166 PF09769 (ECOD; PDBsum)
- AlphaFold: IPR019166; PF09769

Apolipoprotein O also known as protein FAM121B is a protein that in humans is encoded by the APOO gene. APOO is a member of the apolipoprotein family.

The human, apolipoprotein O is a 198 amino acids protein that contains a 23 amino acids long signal peptide. The apoprotein is secreted by a microsomal triglyceride transfer protein (MTTP)-dependent mechanism, probably as a VLDL-associated protein that is subsequently transferred to HDL. Apolipoprotein O is the first chondroitine sulphate chain containing apolipoprotein.

Apolipoproteins are proteins that binds to lipids. Members of this family promote cholesterol efflux from macrophage cells. They are present in various lipoprotein complexes, including HDL, LDL and VLDL.
