= Appu Kuttan =

Indian American engineer

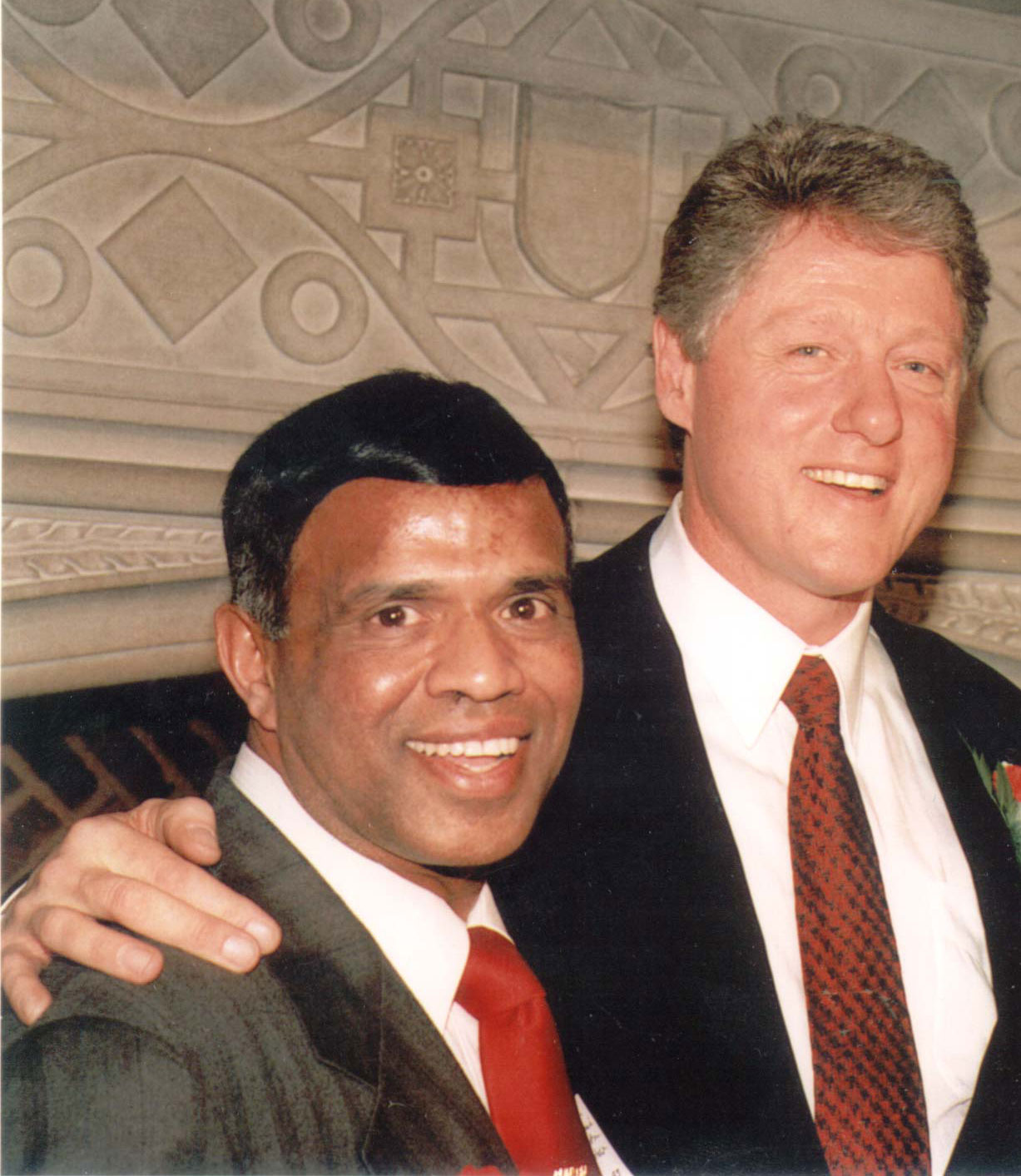
- Kuttan with US President Bill Clinton
- Born: Kerala, India
- Education: University of Kerala Washington University in St. Louis; University of Wisconsin-Madison

Appu Kuttan (born 1941, Kerala, India), is an Indian American philanthropist, consultant, author, and the founder and chairman of the National Education Foundation (NEF), a global non-profit organization, founded in 1989. His philanthropic efforts include the distribution of over one million individualized courses at substantially reduced rates to public schools and colleges. He is the developer of Management By Systems and Cyberlearning. He has written several books and articles, including Happy Executive — A Systems Approach; Nurturing Mind, Body and Soul and From Digital Divide to Digital Opportunity. He has served as an advisor to President Bill Clinton, India Prime Minister Rajiv Gandhi, the President of Venezuela, and the Mauritius Prime Minister.

Kuttan has led a number of national and international reform programs addressing issues including traffic improvement (Puerto Rico), social security and healthcare reform (Venezuela), literacy and internet access improvement (Egypt), health and fitness through 'CardioSalsa' and 'Running Pushups' (USA), and STEM+ Education (USA). A former athlete and owner of a global tennis academy, he mentored several tennis players including Andre Agassi and Monica Seles.

== Early life, education ==
Appu Kuttan was born in 1941 in Kerala, India. He received his bachelor's degree in Electrical Engineering from the Kerala University in 1963, and moved to the United States in 1964 on a Tata scholarship to attend Washington University in St. Louis. He graduated from Washington University with a master's degree in 1966, and then earned a PhD in industrial engineering at the University of Wisconsin-Madison in 1968.

== Early career ==
Early in his career, Kuttan created the Management By Systems (MBS) concept of setting specific goals and objectives, and achieving them by deploying available resources systematically and effectively. In the 1970s, he was invited by the Governor of Puerto Rico to improve their traffic system by applying his MBS strategies. Specifically, through implementing his innovative 3 E's philosophy (Effectiveness, Efficiency, Effort), he was able to improve the management of delinquent traffic officers and by reducing public drunkenness, he achieved a dramatic 20% reduction in traffic related death. Soon after, he worked with the Venezuelan government to improve their social security and healthcare programs.

In 1980, he served as an informal adviser to future Indian Prime Minister Rajiv Gandhi, focusing on how to make India an information technology power using India's educated manpower, strategies that were later implemented when Gandhi took power in 1984. He also advised the Prime Minister of Mauritius on making Mauritius an IT-focused nation, and has advised the U.S. administrations of Bill Clinton, George W. Bush, and Barack Obama.

In 1986, he purchased the Nick Bollettieri Tennis Academy in Florida and helped develop and mentor tennis world champions Andre Agassi and Monica Seles.

== National Education Foundation ==
Founded by Kuttan in 1989 with proceeds from the sale of the tennis academy, the National Education Foundation (NEF) is a nonprofit organization based in McLean, Virginia. NEF's mission is to advance economic equity by helping learners prepare for college and in demand, high salaried careers. NEF also provides a successful STEM+ education program for K-12. NEF's programs have had the biggest impact in the United States and India. Kuttan remains CEO and chairman of the board. NEF is currently providing $100 million in Career and Technical Education (CTE) and Workforce Development Grants.

=== CyberLearning ===
Launched in 1993, NEF CyberLearning provided students in disadvantaged U.S. schools with access to science, technology, engineering, math, English, social studies, business, and test prep skills (STEM+). CyberLearning offered 6,000 online courses to help disadvantaged learners. NEF CyberLearning partnered with the State University of New York (SUNY) to create STEM+ Academies, education that includes personalized learning, teacher stipends, student rewards, teacher and parent training. Lehighton Area School District, PA, won NEF's 2016 STEM+ Academy of the Year ($11,000), because their students advanced a grade level in math and reading in just 26 and 27 learning hours respectively. On January 7, 2017, NEF launched a $100 Million Grant initiative for schools across the U.S. to boost STEM education.

== Books ==
Kuttan's book Happy Executive — A Systems Approach: Nurturing Mind, Body and Soul is partly his memoir, and partly a self-help guide for business executives. According to Kirkus, the book provides “a methodical, well-organized guide for the world’s future leaders.”

In March 2003, Kuttan and Laurence Peters published a textbook titled From Digital Divide to Digital Opportunity.

== Awards ==
- In August 2006, Certiport named Kuttan their Global Digital Literacy Champion, an annual prize awarded for spreading computer literacy around the world, stating, "We selected Dr. Appu Kuttan unanimously for this prestigious award because of his outstanding leadership and contributions towards advancing digital literacy in many countries over many years."
- On October 14, 2011, University of Wisconsin-Madison College of Engineering gave Kuttan a Distinguished Achievement Award for his lifelong work, stating, “One million -- It’s the number of disadvantaged students Appu Kuttan helps via NEF, the nonprofit he founded in 1989, dedicated to bridging academic, digital, and employment divides through digital education.”
- In February 2026, Kuttan was featured in "Jewels of India – Bharat Ki Shaan, Bharat Ka Abhiman,'' a book profiling members of the Indian diaspora whose "courage, sacrifice, and vision are shaping communities across continents."
- In May 2026, Kuttan received the SHIFT Legacy Award at the Close It Summit, an event focused on workforce development and education.

== Personal life ==
Kuttan lives in the Washington DC Metro area with his wife, Claudia, also an alumnus of University of Wisconsin, Madison. They have two adult children, Roger and Maya.
