= APOS Theory =

Framework for mathematics education

In mathematics education, APOS Theory is a framework of how mathematical concepts are learned. APOS Theory was developed by Ed Dubinsky and others and is based on Jean Piaget's notion of reflective abstraction. APOS stands for Actions, Processes, Objects, Schemas, the four main mental structures involved in the theory. APOS Theory takes a constructivist view towards mathematical learning. Implementations of APOS Theory in classrooms typically use the ACE Teaching Cycle, a pedagogical strategy with three chronological components: activities, classroom discussion, and exercises. Implementations also often use mathematical programming languages, most commonly ISETL.

== Mental structures and mechanisms ==
APOS Theory emphasizes four mental structures: Actions, Processes, Objects, and Schemas and its mental mechanisms: Interiorization, Encapsulation, Coordination, Reversal, among others.

1. Actions are specific manipulations or transformations done to already understood mathematical objects. Actions are external, meaning that each step of the transformation needs to be performed explicitly and guided by external instructions. For example, someone who can only think about functions by substituting a number into an expression has an action understanding of functions.
2. Processes are actions that have been fully internalized. Someone who has internalized an action into a process can do the action without external instruction, can skip steps, and can imagine performing the process in the abstract without specific inputs being present. The shift from an action understanding to a process understanding is called interiorization. For example, someone with a process understanding of a function is able to think about a function as taking in unspecified inputs and applying a transformation to them to produce an output, and someone who has a process understanding of an n-tuple is able to mentally consider the concept of an n-tuple for unspecified n.
3. Objects are cognitive objects coming from the ability to conceptualize the totality of a process and understanding how to put additional structure on that totality. The shift from a process understanding to an object understanding is called encapsulation. Someone with an object understanding of functions is able to form a set of functions and define additional structure on that set, such as operations or a topology. Encapsulation is considered the most difficult step in APOS-based instruction.
4. Schemas are collections of actions, processes, and objects, and other schemas, and the interactions between them, and the ability to understand in what situations it applies. For example, for someone who understands the theory of vector spaces, the mental structure of a vector space is a schema.

The mental structures are not necessarily gone through in a linear progression.

== See also ==
- Mathematics education
- Constructivism (philosophy of education)
- Reflective abstraction
- Jean Piaget
