= Yuxarı Apu =

Yukhary Apu
- Azerbaijani: Yuxarı Apu
- Interactive map of Yukhary Apu
- Coordinates: 38°40′N 48°44′E
- Country: Azerbaijan
- District: Lankaran
- Municipality: Daştatük
- Time zone: UTC+4 (AZT)
  - Summer (DST): UTC+5 (AZT)

Yuxarı Apu (also, Yukhary Apu) is a village in the Lankaran District of Azerbaijan. The village forms part of the municipality of Daştatük.

The village is home to several endangered native plants.
