= Apo Avedissian =

Iraqi-born Armenian-American artist, film-maker, writer and photographer

- Աբօ Ավետիսյան
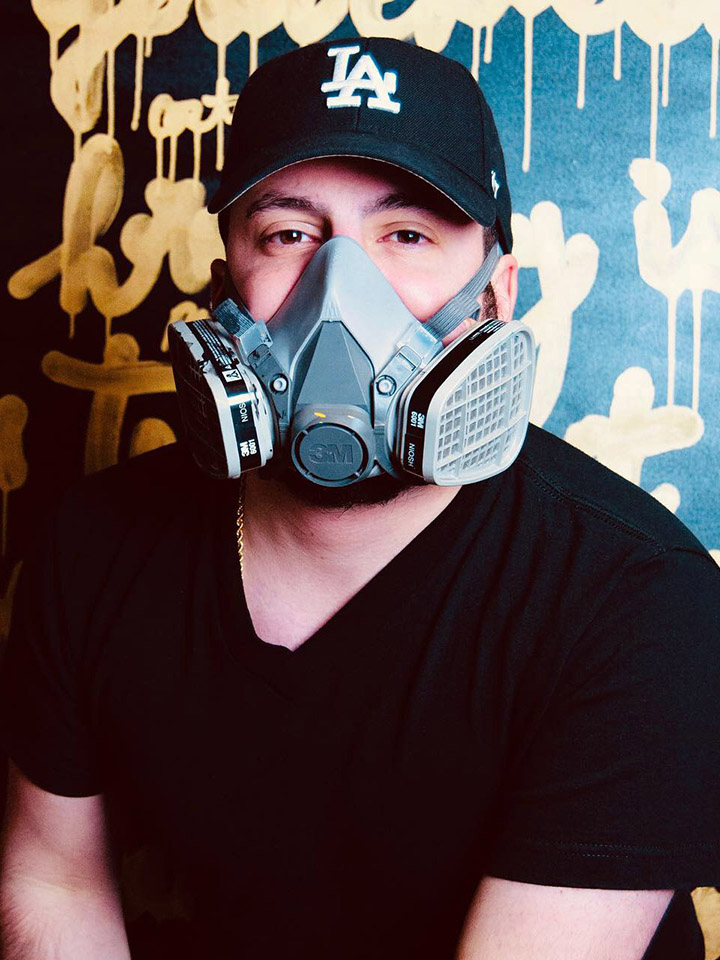
- Born: July 24, 1990; Baghdad, Iraq
- Website: www.apoavedissian.com

Apo Avedissian (born 24 July 1990 in Baghdad, Iraq) is an Iraqi-American artist of Armenian descent, often working in film-making, painting, photography, and writing.

Avedissian’s writing portfolio most notably includes the autobiographical book “Thirteen in Baghdad,” detailing his life as a teenager in Baghdad during the 2003 Iraq War.

== Personal life ==
Avedissian started his path into the world of photography and his documentary-style videography at the age of thirteen, at the beginning of the 2003 Iraq War. He was born to Armenian parents, both of whom were children/grandchildren of Armenian genocide survivors whose journey through the desert had ended in Iraq. He immigrated to the United States in 2005, and is fluent in Arabic, Armenian, and English, often using one or the other in his artwork.

== Artwork ==
Armenia & Artsakh - A Bird's Eye View poster featuring Artsakh's Gandzasar Monastery.

Over two dozen of Avedissian's paintings hang at the Crypto.com Arena (formerly known as Staples Center) as part of 47 commissioned pieces completed by him for the venue, some of which were also made for the Microsoft Theater. In 2020, a 5x5 ft canvas was also commissioned by Professional Bull Riders for their Iron Cowboy show in Los Angeles that year.

The drone shot "Armenia & Artsakh - A Bird's Eye View," portions of which were used in System of a Down's "Protect the Land" music video, and in RT America's production "Forgotten Genocides", in addition to the previous short-film “Obsessive Possessive - An Experience,” have generated over ten million combined views. As of 2019, he has released 1-minute-long painting videos, also surpassing ten million combined views.

=== Influencers ===
Avedissian cites graffiti artist Retna and stencil artist Shepard Fairey as the two artists he follows closely the most.

== Activism ==
Avedissian's teen years being spent in war and his grandparents' survival from the genocide put an immense load on his upbringing. Avedissian’s work often includes tributes and a push for international recognition of the Armenian Genocide, including starting the Twitter #ArmenianGenocide campaign the week prior to April 24, 2011. Using his blog's popularity to reach bigger accounts, and trending it after the involvement of and assistance from popular accounts like Kim Kardashian’s, the hashtag has been trending yearly on the Armenian Genocide Remembrance Day, since.

Avedissian visited Armenia and the Republic of Artsakh in 2018, post the 2018 Armenian revolution, and documented his trip via drone footage, which are all featured in his "Armenia & Artsakh - A Bird's Eye View" short film. Some of the footage was also used in System of a Down's "Protect the Land" music video, which was released during the 2020 Nagorno-Karabakh war with all proceeds sent as humanitarian aid for Armenians fleeing their homes. Released on April 23 of 2021, a day before the 106th anniversary of the Armenian Genocide, more of Avedissian's drone footage was used in RT America's "Forgotten Genocides".
