= Aşağı Apu =

Ashaghy Apu
- Azerbaijani: Aşağı Apu
- Location within Azerbaijan
- Coordinates: 38°40′N 48°45′E
- Country: Azerbaijan
- District: Lankaran
- Municipality: Daştatük
- Time zone: UTC+4 (AZT)
  - Summer (DST): UTC+5 (AZT)

Aşağı Apu (also, Ashagy Apu) is a village in the Lankaran District of Azerbaijan. The village forms part of the municipality of Daştatük.
