= Anchored Instruction =

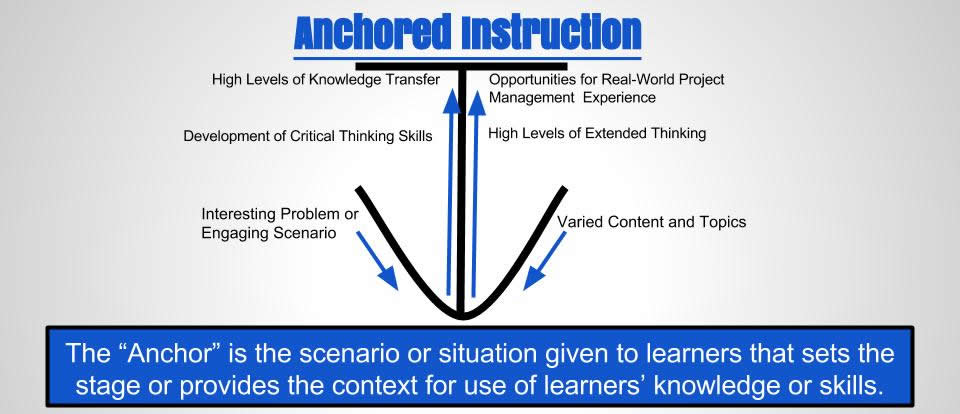

Anchored Instruction is a technology centered learning approach, which falls under the social constructionism paradigm. It is a form of situated learning that emphasizes problem-solving within an integrated learning context, which can be examined from multiple perspectives. "In other words, the learning is contextualized to provide students with realistic roles that serve to enhance the learning process", (Fried, Zannini, Wheeler, Lee, & Cortez, 2005). During teaching, activities are designed or tied around an "anchor", such as an adventure or story, with a problem at the end, that needs to be resolved. The connection made between the content and the authentic context is referred to as "anchoring". These models typically embed all the information needed for the problem to be solved, such data and hints. Anchored instruction is akin to problem-based learning (P.B.L.) with the exception of its open-endedness.

== Principles for designing anchored instruction ==
The seven principles outlined, are used to govern the design of anchored instruction (Biswas, Goldman, & Bransford, 1997).

1. Generative Learning Format - An appropriate anchor is selected for the instruction. This is usually a story that leads to a problem, which is of interest to the students. The end of the story, which is the solution to the problem, needs to be generated by the learner. This method provides intrinsic motivation, through active learning, because the students take ownership of the problem.
2. Video-Based Presentation Format - This format allows learner to understand the complex and intertwined problems better than a text or audio format. It solidifies what is taught in textbooks and other literature through a dynamic, visual and spatial representation. The video medium gives life to the characters and depicts an authentic storyline. This format appeals to students who may have difficulty reading, or understanding written text and allows them to develop pattern recognition skills
3. Narrative Format - The video is narrated to give an account for the characters, the event, and subsequent events. The problem occurs naturally which give the students the impression they are resolving a real problem and not responding to a lecture on a video. The narrative format also makes it easier to embed information into the story.
4. Problem Complexity - The story or adventure used should have a high level of complexity to demand the full attention and stimulate the curiosity of the learner. The problems or issues should require several steps to be solved. This is based on the Anchored Interactive Learning Environment's (Ihlström & Westerlund, 2013) premise; learners must be trained to deal with complex problems that are more realistic.
5. Embedded Data Design - The story includes seamlessly embedded information that is needed to solve the issues. It should also include a great deal of extraneous information. When formatted in this manner, the learner would need to understand the question and determine what information is pertinent to answering the question. (Goldman, et al.; Sherwood, et al., 1995).
6. Opportunities for Transfer - Learners are able to transfer knowledge from one subject, example Geometry, to the topics in the same subject. This increases deep learning and skill transfer.
7. Links Across the Curriculum - In addition to containing all the necessary information, to solve the issue, the story may also introduce topics from other subjects, to provide a holistic learning approach.

== Roles ==
Anchored instruction highlights the use of Instructional technology. Teachers are moved from the source of information to a coach. It is widely used at primary levels, and is applied to Mathematics, Reading and Language skills.

=== Role of the Learner ===
Anchored instruction, promotes active learning, by motivating and challenging learners. The story or anchor contains embedded data along with other extraneous information; it is the learner's responsibility to decipher, extract and organize pertinent information. The problem that needs to be solved, often requires the learner to take multiple steps, by generating a man smaller questions, that ought to support and guide their thinking. Small groups of learners are the appropriate size for this type of instruction. Members of the group often provide multiple opinions, thus having multiple solutions to the problem. Students are responsible for establishing their learning goals. The learning goals of students should be aligned with their motivation for choosing a particular discipline to study.

=== Role of the Facilitator ===
The facilitators are responsible for providing the anchor, the problem statement and embedded data in the story. Anchored stories also contain hints that act as instructional scaffolding to resolve problems. Scaffolding provides a temporary framework to support learning. The facilitator coaches and guides the learners through the learning process. They assist students to establish their own learning goals. And accept that they are no longer the major source of knowledge.

== Other references ==
- Circles, L. (2002, September 11). John Bransford - Anchored Instruction. Retrieved from Lifecircles Inc: https://web.archive.org/web/20150710072426/http://www.lifecircles-inc.com/Learningtheories/bransford.html
- Kaylor, Maria (2003). Sustaining the use of anchored instruction (Thesis). ProQuest 305294413.
- Research-Starters. (2015). Anchored Instruction. Retrieved from Enotes.com: http://www.enotes.com/research-starters/anchored-instruction
- Spiro, R. J., & Nix, D. (2012). Cognition, Education, and Multimedia: Exploring Ideas in High Technology. Routhedge.
- Vanderbilt, The Cognition and Technology Group at (1990). "Anchored Instruction and Its Relationship to Situated Cognition". Educational Researcher. 19 (6): 2–10. doi:10.2307/1177136. JSTOR 1177136.
