= APU =

APU or Apu may refer to:

== Film and television ==
- The Apu Trilogy, a series of three Indian films, directed by Satyajit Ray, with the fictional character Apu Roy, comprising:
  - Pather Panchali (Song of the Little Road) (1955), the first of the three films, covering the early childhood of Apu
  - Aparajito (The Unvanquished) (1956), the second film, covering the remaining years of Apu's youth and adolescence
  - Apur Sansar (The World of Apu) (1959), the final film of the trilogy, covering Apu's adulthood
- Apu Nahasapeemapetilon, a fictional character from the animated television series The Simpsons (appearing 1990–present)

== Literature ==
- Apu Roy, the fictional character in two novels by Bibhutibhushan Bandyopadhyay:
  - Pather Panchali (1929), the basis for the first film of The Apu Trilogy
  - Aparajito, a second novel by Bibhutibhushan Bandyopadhyay, the basis of the second and third films of the trilogy
- Apu (magazine), a Finnish family magazine (1933–present)

== Organizations ==
- Aliança Povo Unido, or United People Alliance, a political coalition in Portugal
- Applied Psychology Unit, now the Cognition and Brain Sciences Unit at the Medical Research Council, United Kingdom
- Evangelical Church of the old-Prussian Union, (Evangelische Kirche der altpreußischen Union) a former church
- Amherst Political Union, a student debating organization at Amherst College

=== Education ===
- Alaska Pacific University, in Anchorage, Alaska, United States
- American Public University, in Charles Town, West Virginia, United States
- Anglia Polytechnic University, former name of Anglia Ruskin University in England
- Azusa Pacific University, in Azusa, California, United States
- Asia Pacific University of Technology & Innovation, colloquially known as Asia Pacific University, in Kuala Lumpur, Malaysia
- Ritsumeikan Asia Pacific University, in Beppu, Ōita, Japan
- Azim Premji University, in Bangalore, Karnataka, India

== Technology ==
- AMD APU, marketing term from AMD for a microprocessor that includes a CPU and a GPU within a single chip
- Audio processing unit, a microprocessor for processing audio on computers
- Auxiliary power unit, a device on a vehicle that provides energy for functions other than propulsion. They were called "Airborne Auxiliary Power Plant" (AAPP) on certain British Cold War era aircraft.

== Transportation ==
- Apucarana Airport, Brazil, by IATA code
- Apu (1899), a Finnish icebreaker
- Apu (1970), a Finnish icebreaker, in the list of icebreakers

== Other uses ==
- Apu, another name for Upu, an ancient region surrounding Damascus
- Apu (god), a deity or honorific in South American religion and Incan mythology
- Augusto Pinochet Ugarte, 31st President of Chile

== See also ==
- Appu (disambiguation)
- Aşağı Apu, a village in Azerbaijan
- Yuxarı Apu, a village in Azerbaijan
- The Problem with Apu a 2017 documentary film critiquing stereotypes of people from India and the fictional character of Apu in The Simpsons
