= Apex AP-0 =

Electric concept sports car

The Apex AP-0 is an all-electric concept sports car announced in 2020 by the British/Hong Kong sportscar company Apex Motors, that went into production in late 2022.

The AP-0 has a claimed top speed and performance of 190 mph (306 km/h) and acceleration from 0-60 mph in 2.3 seconds. It is powered by a 650 bhp rear-mounted electric motor with 580 Nm of torque and a 90 kWh lithium-ion battery.

Designed by Guy Colborne, the AP-0 has a claimed kerb weight of 1200 kg due to the AP-0's monocoque carbon chassis, with modular spaceframe and a central spine.

In March 2023 the company renamed the AP-0 as the Attucks Apex AP0 and announced the involvement of Wyclef Jean. The proposed price had doubled from the 2020 version.

== In popular culture ==
The APEX AP-0 appears as a playable blueprint-unlockable vehicle in the mobile game Asphalt 9: Legends as added in the "British Season Update" along with two other new cars: McLaren Speedtail, Aston Martin Valhalla, & McLaren F1 LM. This also the first Asphalt appearance of new car manufacturer, APEX.

A fictional mash-up version of the APEX AP-0 that features parts from the Bugatti Bolide and Apollo Intensa Emozione appears as a playable vehicle in the mobile game Crash of Cars under the name "Zenith".
