= Curriculum & Instruction =

Academic discipline

Curriculum and Instruction (C&I or Curriculum and Pedagogy or Curriculum and Teaching or Curricula and Instruction) is a field within education which seeks to research, develop, and implement curriculum changes that increase learner achievement in educational settings. The field focuses on how people learn and the best ways to educate. It is also interested in new trends in the teaching and learning process. It tries to find answers to questions such as "why to teach", "what to teach", "how to teach" and "how to evaluate" in the instructional process. Master's degrees and doctorates are offered at a number of universities.

== History ==
The Curriculum (1918), by the American educator John Franklin Bobbitt, is widely regarded as one of the foundational works in the field of curriculum studies, and Bobbitt is generally considered one of the principal founders of modern curriculum theory. He was followed by W. W. Charters, who further developed the analysis-of-activities approach to curriculum construction, and by Hollis L. Caswell, who broadened the concept of curriculum to encompass the totality of students' educational experiences both inside and outside the classroom.

In 1949, Ralph W. Tyler published Basic Principles of Curriculum and Instruction, one of the most influential works in the history of curriculum studies. In this work, Tyler introduced a systematic framework for defining educational objectives, selecting and organizing learning experiences, and evaluating the extent to which those objectives had been achieved. This framework, later known as the Tyler Rationale, remained a dominant model for curriculum design and evaluation for decades.

Benjamin Bloom also made a significant contribution to curriculum studies through the publication of the Taxonomy of Educational Objectives (1956), which became one of the most widely used frameworks for formulating curriculum objectives and assessing learning outcomes. Meanwhile, Jerome Bruner introduced the concept of the spiral curriculum in The Process of Education (1960), emphasizing that curricula should be organized around the fundamental structures of academic disciplines.

In 1962, Hilda Taba published Curriculum Development: Theory and Practice, in which she proposed an inductive model of curriculum development, emphasizing teachers' central role in curriculum design and evaluation, as well as the importance of developing students' thinking skills alongside the acquisition of knowledge. Her work was influenced by the educational philosophy of John Dewey and by the contributions of Tyler and other leading educational theorists.

Beginning in the 1970s, curriculum studies underwent significant theoretical transformations. Joseph J. Schwab criticized traditional technical models and argued that curriculum should be understood as a practical enterprise responsive to educational contexts. Lawrence Stenhouse reconceptualized curriculum as an ongoing process of inquiry and development, while William F. Pinar played a leading role in establishing the Reconceptualization movement, which expanded curriculum studies to include philosophical, cultural, social, and political dimensions of education.

== Concept of curriculum ==
In education, a curriculum (/kəˈrɪkjʊləm/; pl.: curriculums or curricula /kəˈrɪkjʊlə/) is the totality of student experiences that occur in an educational process. The term often refers specifically to a planned sequence of instruction, or to a view of the student's experiences in terms of the educator's or school's instructional goals. A curriculum may incorporate the planned interaction of pupils with instructional content, materials, resources, and processes for evaluating the attainment of educational objectives. Curricula are split into several categories: the explicit, the implicit (including the hidden), the excluded, and the extracurricular.

=== The hidden curriculum ===
A hidden curriculum is a set of lessons "which are learned but not openly intended" to be taught in school such as the norms, values, and beliefs conveyed in both the classroom and social environment. In many cases, it occurs as a result of social interactions and expectations. The term hidden curriculum is sometimes seen as synonymous with, or a subset of, the implicit curriculum.

== Concept of curriculum theory ==
Curriculum theory (CT) is an academic discipline devoted to examining and shaping educational curricula. There are many interpretations of CT, being as narrow as the dynamics of the learning process of one child in a classroom to the lifelong learning path an individual takes. CT can be approached from the educational, philosophical, psychological and sociological perspectives. James MacDonald states "one central concern of theorists is identifying the fundamental unit of curriculum with which to build conceptual systems. Whether this be rational decisions, action processes, language patterns, or any other potential unit has not been agreed upon by the theorists." Curriculum theory is fundamentally concerned with values, the historical analysis of curriculum, ways of viewing current educational curriculum and policy decisions, and theorizing about the curricula of the future.

=== Schools of curriculum thought ===
Curriculum theory has evolved considerably since the early twentieth century, giving rise to several schools of thought that reflect different perspectives on the purposes and functions of education. Among the most influential is the traditional school, which emphasizes the transmission of organized knowledge and the preservation of cultural heritage. The scientific or technical school, influenced by the principles of Scientific management, views curriculum as a systematic process of defining educational objectives and measuring learning outcomes, as exemplified in the works of Ralph W. Tyler and Hilda Taba. During the second half of the twentieth century, the humanistic school emerged, focusing on learners' personal growth and lived experiences. It was followed by the constructivist school, which regards learning as a process through which learners actively construct knowledge through interaction with their environment. The critical school, associated with scholars such as Paulo Freire and Michael Apple, examines the relationships between curriculum, power, culture, and social justice. More recently, postmodern approaches have challenged traditional conceptions of curriculum by emphasizing cultural diversity and the social, political, and philosophical dimensions of education.

== Curriculum development models ==
Throughout the history of curriculum studies, several models have been developed to guide curriculum design, implementation, and evaluation. Among the most influential is the Tyler Rationale, which is based on four fundamental questions concerning educational objectives, learning experiences, the organization of those experiences, and evaluation. In contrast, Hilda Taba's model adopts an inductive approach that begins with identifying learners' needs before formulating objectives and organizing curriculum content. Other influential frameworks include Wheeler's cyclical model, which conceptualizes curriculum development as a continuous and iterative process; Kerr's model, which emphasizes the interactive relationship among objectives, content, learning experiences, and evaluation; and the Saylor–Alexander–Lewis model, which focuses on comprehensive curriculum planning at the institutional level. These models continue to serve as major theoretical foundations for curriculum development in contemporary educational systems.

== Curriculum studies ==
Curriculum studies or curriculum sciences is a concentration in the different types of curriculum and instruction concerned with understanding curricula as an active force influenced by human educational experiences. Its proponents investigate the relationship between curriculum theory and educational practice in addition to the relationship between school programs, the contours of the society, and the culture in which schools are located.

=== Contemporary trends ===
In the twenty-first century, curriculum studies have increasingly embraced more flexible approaches that respond to scientific, technological, and social change. Prominent contemporary trends include competency-based learning, which emphasizes learners' mastery of knowledge, skills, and values; backward design, which begins with identifying desired learning outcomes before selecting instructional activities and assessment methods; and STEM education, which promotes interdisciplinary integration across science, technology, engineering, and mathematics. In addition, digital curricula and online learning environments have become increasingly widespread, while artificial intelligence and learning analytics are being incorporated into curriculum design, personalized learning, and educational assessment. Greater attention has also been given to themes such as sustainability, global citizenship, and lifelong learning, all of which have become central considerations in contemporary curriculum development.

== See also ==
- Journal of Curriculum and Instruction
- Curriculum studies
- Hidden curriculum

== Sources ==
- Kelly, A.V. (2009). The Curriculum: theory and practice (6th ed.). ISBN 9781847872746.
