= William Spady =

William G. Spady is an academic, educational psychologist, sociologist and is considered the father of Outcome-Based Education (OBE). He is largely noted for his works that attempt to expand and enhance the philosophical grounding and performance of educators, leaders, educational systems, and learners.

== Background ==
Spady became a lecturer at Harvard University and the Ontario Institute of Education from 1967 to 1973. He has also worked as a senior research sociologist at the National Institute of Education and as an Associate Executive Director of the American Association for School Administrators. Spady is CEO of IN4OBE, a global network of OBE experts, consultants and visionaries

== Spady and OBE ==
Spady coined the term outcome-based education in 1988 as an extension of the works completed by John Franklin Bobbitt and Ralph W. Tyler. In his conceptualization, Spady described OBE as the reorientation in educational system towards what is essential for all students to be successful at the end of their learning experiences. This primarily entails the identification of what is important for the learners to be able to do so that the curriculum, instruction and assessment are organized accordingly.

Spady's research is still widely cited in nations such as Australia which are still adopting OBE.

Spady also participated in the Task Force on Education Organization created in Minnesota by a 1988 legislative session. The task force's draft for outcomes system followed his approach.

== Works ==
Spady is the author or co-author of nine books. His latest works are Outcome Based Education’s Empowering Essence, published in 2021, Beyond Outcomes Accreditation, published in 2018 and Bringing Heart and Soul to Education, published in 2014. He has also worked for Breakthrough Learning at Dillon, Colorado.
