= William Pinar =

American pedagogue (born 1947)

- Born: William Frederick Pinar; 1947 (age 78–79); Huntington, West Virginia, US

Academic background
- Education: Ohio State University
- Thesis: Humanities Program (1972)
- Doctoral advisor: Donald R. Bateman

Academic work
- Discipline: Pedagogy
- Sub-discipline: Curriculum theory
- School or tradition: Reconceptualist movement
- Institutions: University of Rochester; Louisiana State University; University of British Columbia
- Notable ideas: Currere
- Influenced: Henry Giroux

William Frederick Pinar (born 1947) is an American pedagogue. Known for his work in the area of curriculum theory, Pinar is strongly associated with the reconceptualist movement in curriculum theory since the early 1970s. In the early 1970s, along with Madeleine Grumet, Pinar introduced the notion of currere, shifting in a radical manner the notion of curriculum as a noun to curriculum as a verb. Apart from his fundamental contributions to theory, Pinar is notable for establishing the Journal of Curriculum Theorizing, founding the Bergamo Conference on Curriculum Theory and Classroom Practice, and founding the International Association for the Advancement of Curriculum Studies.

Although Pinar is known best for his publications concerning curriculum theory, he has also spoken about and written on many other topics, including education, cultural studies, international studies, and queer studies.

== Life and works ==
Before taking up the post of Canada Research Chair at the University of British Columbia in 2005, Pinar taught at Louisiana State University where, in his capacity as St. Bernard Parish Alumni Endowed Professor, he taught curriculum theory. He has also served as the Frank Talbott Professor at the University of Virginia and the A. Lindsay O'Connor Professor of American Institutions at Colgate University. Additionally, he has held visiting appointments at Teachers College, Columbia University, Ohio State University, the Ontario Institute for Studies in Education, and the University of Alberta, among other institutions. He is presently at the University of British Columbia.

In 1969, Pinar graduated from Ohio State University with a Bachelor of Science degree in education and subsequently taught English at the Paul D. Schreiber High School in Port Washington, Long Island, New York, from 1969 to 1971. Pinar then returned to Ohio State University to obtain Master of Arts (1970) and Doctor of Philosophy (1972) degrees. Pinar is the founding editor of the Journal of Curriculum Theorizing, (Note: JCT: Journal of Curriculum Theorizing is an interdisciplinary journal of curriculum studies.) creating the first issue in 1979. He also founded, with Janet Miller, the Bergamo Conference on Curriculum Theory and Classroom Practice. Since then, he has established a number of associations, including the International Association for the Advancement of Curriculum Studies, of which he is the President, and the American Association for the Advancement of Curriculum Studies, for which he serves as Conference Committee chair.

Long associated with the "reconceptualist movement" to describe the field as it appeared in the 1970s, Pinar's use of the term reconceptualization, as he notes in "A Farewell and a Celebration", is "not dramatic enough" and more aptly described as an "intellectual breakthrough". This particular movement in the history of the field of curriculum theory is described in detail in Understanding Curriculum. Pinar notes, reflecting back upon the reconceptualist movement of the field and the comments of Bill Pilder at the first conference in Rochester, that

... my generation rejected the position that history and tradition had fashioned for us. The curriculum—especially the secondary school curriculum—had been settled, more or less, in its official senses; it would be directed toward, and articulated with, postsecondary destinations, key among them the university and the workplace. What remained of the progressive dream—education for democratization, which meant schooling for psychological and social as well as intellectual development.

The aim of the reconceptualist movement was to "understand, not just implement or evaluate, the curriculum". As such, we see, as described in Understanding Curriculum, the movement open up to and embrace a variety of different forms of praxis like "history, politics, race, gender, phenomenology, postmodernism, autobiography, aesthetics, theology, the institution of schooling, the world". Put differently, we see a significant shift from the usually taken-for-granted bureaucratization of schooling and the schooled experience to the intellectual exploration of a field by all. Unlike the early, influential days and subsequent preoccupation with the "Tyler Rationale", Pinar and his many colleagues aimed to move beyond the narrowly defined prescriptions and procedures often attributed to Ralph Tyler.

Still, as Pinar writes in Contemporary Curriculum Discourses, this Kuhnian-like "shift" has been slow. Even to this day, the beginning of the 21st century, the reconceptualist movement is still to be felt: "While the academic field of curriculum studies has been reconceived, the major ideas which constitute the contemporary field of study have yet to make their way to colleagues in elementary and secondary schools."

== Major works ==
A prolific scholar in his right, Pinar also has established a number of academic journals and scholarly organizations, founding and establishing Journal of Curriculum Theorizing, founding the Bergamo Conference on Curriculum Theory and Classroom Practice, as well as the founding and presiding over the International Association for the Advancement of Curriculum Studies.

The following is a list of Pinar's major published works:

- The Worldliness of a Cosmopolitan Education: Passionate Lives in Public Service (2009).
- Intellectual Advancement through Disciplinarity: Verticality and Horizontality in Curriculum Studies (2007).
- Queering Straight Teachers (2007). (Edited with Nelson Rodriguez.)
- The Synoptic Text Today and Other Essays: Curriculum Development after the Reconceptualization (2006).
- Race, Religion, and a Curriculum of Reparation: Teacher Education for a Multicultural Society (2006).
- Curriculum in a New Key: The Collected Works of Ted T. Aoki (2005). (Edited with Rita L. Irwin.)
- What Is Curriculum Theory? (2004).
- The Internationalization of Curriculum Studies (2003). (Edited with William E. Doll, Jr., Donna Trueit, and Hongyu Wang.)
- Handbook of International Research in Curriculum (Ed.) (2003).
- The Gender of Racial Politics and Violence in America: Lynching, Prison Rape, and the Crisis of Masculinity (2001).
- How We Work (edited with Marla Morris and Mary Aswell Doll). (1999).
- Contemporary Curriculum Discourses. (Ed.) (1999).
- The Passionate Mind of Maxine Greene: "I Am ... Not Yet." (Ed.) (1998).
- Queer Theory in Education. (Ed.) (1998).
- Curriculum: Toward New Identities. (Ed.) (1998).
- Understanding Curriculum. (With William Reynolds, Patrick Slattery, and Peter Taubman). (1995).
- Autobiography, Politics and Sexuality: Essays in Curriculum Theory 1972-1992. (1994).
- Understanding Curriculum as Racial Text. (Edited with Louis A. Castenell, Jr.). (1993).
- Understanding Curriculum as Phenomenological and Deconstructed Text. (Edited with William M.Reynolds). (1992).
- Curriculum as Social Psychoanalysis: The Significance of Place. (Edited with Joe L. Kincheloe). (1992).
- Contemporary Curriculum Discourses. (Ed.) (1998).
- Curriculum and Instruction: Alternatives in Education. (Edited with Henry A. Giroux and Anthony Penna). (1981).
- Toward a Poor Curriculum. (With Madeleine R. Grumet). (1976).
- Curriculum Theorizing: The Reconceptualists. (Ed.) (1975). [Reissued in 2000 by Educator's International Press, Troy, New York, as Curriculum Studies: The Reconceptualization.]
- Heightened Consciousness, Cultural Revolution, and Curriculum Theory. (Ed.) (1974).

== See also ==
- Queer pedagogy
