= Midwood High School =

Public school in New York City

Location
- 2839 Bedford Ave; Brooklyn, New York 11210; United States; 40°37′58.2″N 73°57′06.9″W

Information
- Type: Public
- Established: September 1940; 86 years ago
- School district: New York City Department of Education
- School code: K405
- NCES School ID: 360015302032
- Principal: Robert J. Quinlan
- Teaching staff: 225.31 (on an FTE basis)
- Grades: 9-12
- Enrollment: 4,059 (2021-2022)
- Student to teacher ratio: 18.02
- Campus: City: Large
- Colors: Navy Blue and White
- Mascot: Hornets
- Newspaper: Argus
- Yearbook: Epilog
- Website: www.midwoodhighschool.org

Midwood High School is a high school located at 2839 Bedford Avenue in Brooklyn, New York City, administered by the New York City Department of Education. It has an enrollment of 3,938 students. Its H-shaped building, with six Ionic columns and a Georgian cupola, was constructed in 1940 as part of the Works Projects Administration.

== Academics ==
=== Ranking ===
Students from the two selective programs often attend top-ranked colleges, many on significant scholarships. Typically, the school sends around 3% of its seniors to Ivy League colleges, and 10% of seniors to colleges such as New York University, Boston College, and Johns Hopkins University. The average SAT scores in Midwood High School (2015) were 530 Verbal, 610 Math, and 570 Writing.

The New York Times reported in 1986, that:

"Getting into Midwood High School ... is about as easy as getting into an Ivy League college. More than 12,000 eager eighth graders applied this year for 450 fall openings in Midwood's highly touted programs in the medical sciences and humanities."

In the 1986–87 and 1997–98 school years, Midwood High School was recognized as a Blue Ribbon School of Excellence by the United States Department of Education and was chosen as a "School of Excellence" by U.S. News & World Report.

=== Population ===
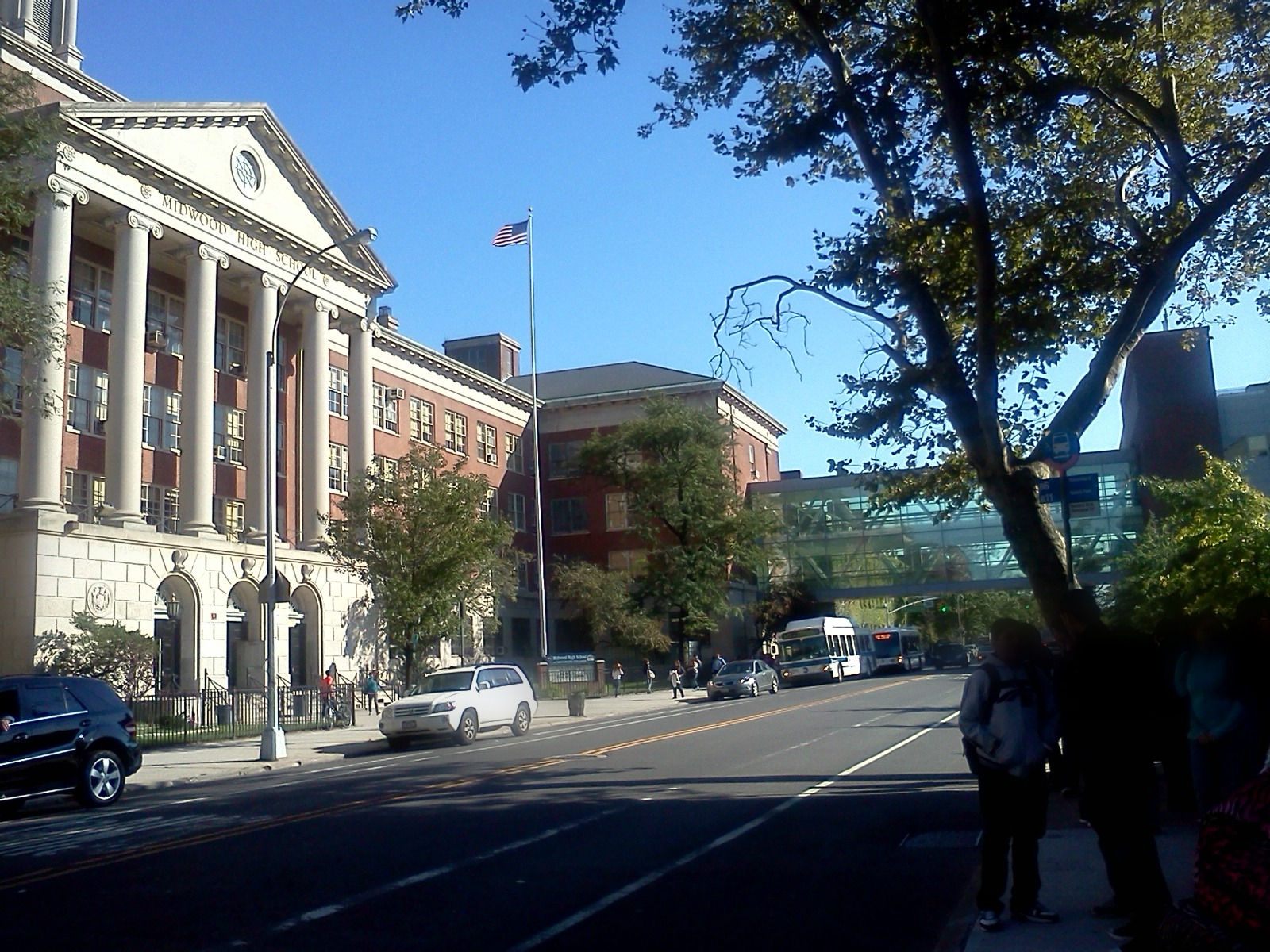
Part of Midwood's building and the new Bridge

As of the 2014–15 school year, the school had an enrollment of 3,785 students and 160.4 classroom teachers (on a full-time equivalent [FTE] basis), for a student–teacher ratio of 23.6:1. There were 1,849 students (48.9% of enrollment) eligible for free lunch and 180 (4.8% of students) eligible for reduced-cost lunch.

The school occupies a building designed to hold 2,800 students, with an enrollment nearly 1,000 larger. Renowned for its diversity, Midwood students are made up of about 37% Asians, 30% African-American, 24% Whites (Non-Hispanics), 7% Hispanic and 2% Native Americans and other races.

Classes are held in three overlapping sessions, with students arriving and departing at different times. Band practice starts at 8 a.m. and the first group of students breaks for lunch at 8:50 a.m. The large population of students creates a high demand for Advanced Placement classes; thus, high grades are required to be able to take the classes.

A new science annex, built across the streets from the original building, opened in the summer of 2008 to help ease the overcrowding problem. The building houses new science labs that replaced the antiquated labs in the original building. The annex also hosts a new library; the library in the original building is now split into two classrooms. The annex is connected to the southern end of the original building by a glass bridge that connects the second and third floors of the buildings.

=== CUNY Brooklyn College partnership ===
Midwood High School is the affiliated campus high school of Brooklyn College, a partnership which began with the 1984–85 academic year. It was one of the earliest New York City public high schools to partner a four-year college in the City College of New York (CUNY) system. The campus high school project reflects the college's continuing concern for strengthening public secondary education and building professional working relationships between its faculty and teachers in the city's schools. Its goal is to strengthen the preparation of Midwood High School students for college and expand the constituency from which those students are drawn.

In this partnership, Midwood High School remains under the jurisdiction of the New York City Department of Education. In matters of curriculum design, school organization and high school–college articulation, the president of Brooklyn College maintains contact with the chancellor of the New York City public schools, the High School Division of the Department of Education and the Midwood High School principal." In addition, Students are able to take classes at Brooklyn College and other Colleges in the CUNY system, free of charge, through the College Now program. Through this program, students can obtain both high school and college credits.

=== Classes ===
==== Advanced Placement courses ====
Midwood offers 22 Advanced Placement courses, and the school's AP courses offerings have been listed by the College Board as among the best in the nation. A high percentage of the students sign up for the Advanced Placement exams, and score in the Upper Quartile. Due to a high demand by students to take AP courses, students are required to apply for AP classes in the spring and go through a competitive academic review process in order to be accepted into AP classes:

- AP Art History (Starting Fall 2015)
- AP Biology
- AP Calculus AB
- AP Calculus BC
- AP Capstone
- AP Chemistry
- AP Computer Science A (Starting Fall 2015)
- AP English Literature
- AP English Language and Composition (Starting Fall 2014)
- AP Environmental Science
- AP European History
- AP Human Geography
- AP Macroeconomics
- AP Physics 1 (Starting Fall 2014)
- AP Physics 2 (Starting Fall 2015)
- AP Physics C: Mechanics
- AP Psychology
- AP Spanish
- AP Statistics
- AP U.S. Government & Politics
- AP United States History
- AP World History

==== Special programs ====
Midwood is composed of three institutes – Medical Science, Humanities, and Liberal Arts. Students are placed into classes specifically for their course. Placement in the Medical Science and Humanities Institutes is highly competitive and dependent upon strong academic performance. Students in either one of these institutes are required to take 6 terms of foreign language at Midwood High School, regardless of any acceleration credit from junior high school.

The Medical Science Institute (Med-Sci) is for students interested in science or the medical field along with mathematical interests. It requires 6 terms of science and 6 terms of math and 6 terms of a foreign language. As of 2011, incoming freshman of the Medical Science Institute must choose from three different tracks: Medical, the Research, or Engineering. The Science Research Program also has its own website.

The Humanities Institute is for students interested in English language arts, literature, languages, and social studies. It requires two foreign languages, including 2 terms of Latin and 6 terms of another foreign language. Also, 8 terms of English, and 8 terms of social studies. The Humanities Institute is a challenging program that affords students the opportunity to learn about the world, its different societies and cultures. Students in this program are not required to take as many years of math and science as students in the Medical Science Program.

The Liberal Arts & Science Institute (formally called the Collegiate Program), serves students who reside in the geographical catchment area. Students in the program choose among four main areas of study: Law/Leadership/Community Service, Pre-engineering/Technology, Performing Arts and Communication/Media Arts. Students in this program with grades at 95 or above average may request to switch to either the medical science or humanities program.

These are supported through the school's courtroom, robotics lab, chemistry lab, drama classrooms, and television studio.

==== Law department ====
Among the variety of courses taught at Midwood, the school has its own Law department, with a mock courtroom, housed on the 4th floor of the main building. Through the law department (under the guidance of the Social Studies department) students have the opportunity to take Criminal and Constitutional law courses, participate in We The People, and participate in Moot Court and Mock Trial competitions, in which the school works with select law firms throughout the city as they compete against other schools. Finally, through the department, students have the chance to take internships with the Kings County District Attorneys Office or other law firms in the city.

=== Intel Science Talent Search Competition ===
Midwood has two classes that specialize in introducing students to scientific research, culminating in the creation of projects for the Intel Science Talent Search (formerly the Westinghouse Intel Science Talent Search). In 1999, Midwood had the most semifinalists in the Intel STS and Siemens-Westinghouse Science & Technology Competition of any school in the country. The following year the school tied for first place in STS.

Secondary schools of finalists and semi-finalists (1999-2015)

Schools with the Most Semifinalists and Finalists (1999–2015)
School	City	State	Semi-finalists	Finalists
Montgomery Blair High School	Silver Spring	MD	183	32
Stuyvesant High School	New York	NY	180	22
Thomas Jefferson High School for Science and Technology	Alexandria	VA	148	10
Bronx High School of Science	Bronx	NY	130	9
Ward Melville High School	East Setauket	NY	126	12
Paul D. Schreiber High School	Port Washington	NY	82	6
Byram Hills High School	Armonk	NY	78	15
Texas Academy of Mathematics and Science	Denton	TX	76	11
The Harker School	San Jose	CA	66	9
Jericho High School	Jericho	NY	64	6
Great Neck North High School	Great Neck	NY	62	7
North Carolina School of Science and Mathematics	Durham	NC	61	3
Ossining High School	Ossining	NY	53	2
Midwood High School	Brooklyn	NY	50	5
Bergen County Academies	Hackensack	NJ	49	6
Lawrence High School	Cedarhurst	NY	49	3
Illinois Math and Science Academy	Aurora	IL	43	9
Great Neck South High School	Great Neck	NY	41	5
John F. Kennedy High School	Bellmore	NY	29	3
Lynbrook High School	San Jose	CA	25	5
Greenwich High School	Greenwich	CT	22	3

Semifinalists by School Each Year (1999-2015)
School	1999	2000	2001	2002	2003	2004	2005	2006	2007	2008	2009	2010	2011	2012	2013	2014	2015
Monta Vista	0	0	0	0	0	0	2	0	0	1	0	0	4	1	0	4	2
Gunn	0	0	0	0	0	1	0	1	1	0	0	0	4	2	3	3	1
Lynbrook	0	1	0	0	0	0	0	0	0	2	0	6	4	2	4	2	4
Harker	0	0	0	0	0	0	0	1	3	3	6	4	7	11	6	10	15
Greenwich	0	2	0	0	2	0	0	0	0	1	0	1	1	2	2	4	7
IMSA	1	1	1	3	0	2	6	5	5	4	2	4	5	3	1	0	0
Montgomery Blair	11	13	10	17	12	13	13	12	12	5	12	12	7	8	5	9	12
Bergen County Academies	0	1	1	1	1	0	2	0	2	2	2	7	6	2	7	7	8
Byram Hills	2	5	7	8	4	6	6	6	4	3	5	4	1	3	5	8	1
John F. Kennedy	1	0	0	1	0	4	5	4	6	2	1	3	1	3	1	3	3
Bronx Science	9	8	17	6	10	6	6	6	6	5	9	5	8	8	6	7	8
Midwood	8	13	5	6	4	6	3	3	1	0	0	0	0	0	0	0	2
Ward Melville	2	8	12	8	8	11	12	12	4	13	11	7	6	5	3	2	2
Great Neck North	3	3	10	6	3	6	4	3	4	2	1	3	3	3	3	3	2
Great Neck South	4	1	3	4	4	1	3	4	3	1	1	1	2	3	2	2	2
Jericho	1	2	2	4	3	3	3	2	4	4	3	5	5	7	5	8	3
Lawrence	7	5	6	7	3	1	2	6	6	0	0	1	1	0	3	1	0
Stuyvesant	10	10	16	15	19	19	5	8	7	11	10	9	5	13	10	11	2
Ossining	0	0	1	3	2	2	2	3	3	6	3	4	8	4	4	3	5
Paul D. Schreiber	8	9	3	2	8	8	5	8	6	6	3	4	3	3	2	3	1
NCSSM	1	0	0	0	0	0	3	2	4	3	4	7	6	7	7	9	8
TAMS	0	2	5	2	5	3	3	2	5	7	8	8	7	9	3	1	6
Thomas Jefferson	15	12	11	4	5	2	5	7	14	10	15	13	7	11	6	5	6

Finalists by School Each Year (1999-2015)
School	1989	1990	1991	1992	1993	1994	1995	1996	1997	1998	1999	2000	2001	2002	2003	2004	2005	2006	2007	2008	2009	2010	2011	2012	2013	2014	2015
Monta Vista	0			0				0			0	0	0	0	0	0	1	0	0	0	0	0	0	0	0	2	0
Gunn	0			0				1			0	0	0	0	0	0	0	0	0	0	0	0	1	1	0	1	0
Lynbrook	0			0				0			0	0	0	0	0	0	0	0	0	0	0	2	0	0	1	1	1
Harker	0			0				0			0	0	0	0	0	0	0	1	0	0	0	1	2	0	1	1	3
Greenwich	0		1	0				0			0	0	0	0	1	0	0	0	0	0	0	0	0	0	1	1	0
IMSA	1			0				0		1	1	0	0	0	0	0	3	2	1	0	1	0	0	1	0	0	0
Montgomery Blair	0	2		2	3		1	1		1	6	2	2	3	1	2	4	2	2	1	0	1	0	1	1	3	1
Bergen County Academies	0			0				0			0	0	0	0	0	0	0	0	0	0	0	1	0	1	1	2	1
Byram Hills	0		1	0				0			0	2	3	1	2	2	1	2	0	1	0	1	0	0	0	0	0
John F. Kennedy	0			0			2	0			0	0	0	1	0	0	0	1	0	0	0	0	0	0	0	0	1
Bronx Science	6	5	1	0	1	3	2	1	1	0	2	0	0	2	1	0	0	0	0	1	2	0	0	1	0	0	0
Midwood	3	1		1		1		0	1		0	2	0	1	0	1	1	0	0	0	0	0	0	0	0	0	1
Ward Melville	0		1	0		2	2	1	3	4	0	0	1	1	0	2	1	2	0	1	2	2	0	0	0	0	0
Great Neck North	0			0				0		1	0	0	2	1	0	0	1	0	0	2	0	0	1	0	0	0	0
Great Neck South	0			0				0		1	3	0	0	1	1	0	0	0	0	0	0	0	0	0	0	0	0
Jericho	0			0				0			0	0	0	0	0	0	0	0	0	0	0	0	1	1	0	2	2
Lawrence	0			0				1	2	2	1	0	0	0	1	0	0	0	0	0	0	1	0	0	0	0	0
Stuyvesant	2	5	6	4	2	1	2	4	1	1	1	1	3	2	3	1	0	0	0	4	2	1	0	2	1	1	0
Ossining	0			0				0			0	0	0	0	0	0	0	0	0	0	0	0	0	0	1	0	1
Paul D. Schreiber	0			2			2	0	2		0	3	0	0	0	0	0	1	0	2	0	0	0	0	0	0	0
NCSSM	1			0				0			0	0	0	0	0	0	0	0	0	0	0	1	1	0	0	1	0
TAMS	0			0				1		1	0	1	1	0	0	0	1	1	1	1	1	2	0	1	0	0	1
Thomas Jefferson	1			0				1	2	3	1	0	2	0	0	1	0	1	1	1	2	1	0	0	0	0	0

== Extracurricular activities ==
=== Sports ===
Midwood has several PSAL sports teams. They include teams in baseball, bowling, basketball, cricket, football, golf, cheerleading, handball, lacrosse, soccer, softball, swimming, tennis, track, wrestling, and volleyball.

In 2018, the boys' lacrosse team won the city championship in their divisions, defeating Columbus High School. In 2017, the girls' volleyball team won the city championship in their division by defeating Cardozo High School. In 2016, the Varsity Boys' Baseball team won the school's first "AAA" Division City Championship by defeating Tottenville High School at Yankee Stadium.

Following a city championship win in 2005, Midwood's handball team won 2 consecutive city championships in 2008 and 2009. Midwood Girls' Handball team won finals in 2009 and city championship in 2010. Midwood's lacrosse team has won several city championships, including 2006, 2007, and 2008. The team had made every championship appearance between 2007 and 2011 with 3 championship wins including an undefeated championship in 2011. Midwood HS Football Team who was coached by Alan G. Arbuse, was also back to back 1979 & 1980 City Champions and 1979 Metro Bowl Champions.

Midwood's girls' bowling team had gone into the semi-final in the past three years, and undefeated division championship. The Midwood boys' bowling team has also made the playoffs 3 times in last 4 years. Midwood's girls' swimming team had come into the play off in the past 14 years, and is considered one of the top teams within Brooklyn and New York City. Midwood also started the first Girls' Lacrosse team in Brooklyn.

The Midwood Boys' Volleyball Team, has gone undefeated in their division for the past 13 years with 4 city championships in 1996, 2001, 2007, and 2009.

The Midwood Boys' Track and Field Team won its first-ever indoor track championship in winter 2008. Under coach Marc Cohen, the track and field team also managed to win its first ever outdoor track title in June 2010, upsetting some of the fastest high schools in the city and solidifying the legacy of Midwood Track and Field. They have also won their first-ever Cross Country title in November 2013

The Midwood Girls' Track and Field Team won their first ever Outdoor title Championship in May 2014.

The team is given the nickname "The Midwood Hornet" or simply "Hornet".

==== SING! ====
SING!, an annual student-run inter-school musical theater competition was conceived at Midwood by Bella Tillis, a music teacher, in 1947. It is still being produced at Midwood. It's also a tradition for many New York City High School seniors, juniors, and "so-fresh" (freshmen and sophomores working together) who compete against each other to put on the best performance at their own school. The 1989 movie Sing, which starred Lorraine Bracco, was based on SING!. SING has been responsible for hours of dedication and hard work, as well as fierce competition, among New York City's high school students.

In the summer of 2004, the film The Squid and the Whale was filmed in Midwood High School's auditorium, using students from the school's Drama Club as extra seat-fillers, in 80s-style costumes. The production also used background scenes on the stage that had been painted for the Drama Club's production of Bye Bye Birdie two months prior. The film production crew also enlisted the help of a former Drama Club and SING! lighting manager to help them light the stage for the scene.

==== Argus ====
The headline picture of Midwood's newspaper Argus

The Argus, Midwood's official school newspaper, publishes articles written by students. It is published monthly. Editors are chosen by Midwood's journalism teacher in June from among the junior Journalism class. It contains different things such as news, features, op-ed, arts & sports, photography, school info, and web info, all per student request/input, as well as updated news about PSAL sport events and other events occurring in and outside the school. The newspaper also has its own website.

== Senior seminar/Independent research studies ==
Midwood High School offers a new program to most senior students who need to fill up their schedule with 5.5 hours of class under the new department of education law that was taken into effect September 2012. During students free periods, they would be offered a multitude of special programs to do for class credit. Examples include SING, peer tutoring, monitoring for a teacher, and certain clubs that are offered in Midwood High School. Students fill out a time card for the number of hours that they have done in school. Students need to get a certain number of hours to pass the class, and it counts as a class credit.

== Notable people ==
=== Notable alumni ===
- Woody Allen (born Allan Stewart Konigsberg, 1935, class of 1953), Academy Award-winning film director and screenwriter, Academy Award-nominated actor, Grammy Award winner
- Antonio Anderson (born 1973), NFL player
- Steve Augeri (born 1959), singer, briefly attended Midwood
- Victor Axelrod (aka Ticklah), musician, producer, arranger and engineer
- Noah Baumbach (born 1969, class of 1987), Academy Award-nominated writer, director, and independent filmmaker (The Squid and the Whale, Marriage Story)
- Paul Ben-Victor (born 1958/1959, class of 1976), actor (The Wire, Entourage)
- Joan Berkowitz (1931–2020), chemist
- Jacques Berlinerblau (born 1966), professor at Georgetown University and writer
- Andrew D. Bernstein, Senior Director of NBA Photos
- Richard J. Bernstein (1932–2022), philosopher who taught at The New School for Social Research
- Steve Bracey (1950–2006), NBA basketball player
- Al Brodax (1926–2016), film and television producer (Yellow Submarine)
- Susan Brownmiller (1935–2025), feminist journalist and activist.
- Richard Campagna (born 1954), 2004 Libertarian Party Vice Presidential candidate
- Mark Cane (born 1944; class of 1961), climate scientist and professor at Columbia University
- Judi Chamberlin (née Rosenberg; 1944–2010), activist, leader, organizer, public speaker and educator in the psychiatric survivors movement
- Robin Alta Charo (born 1958), professor of law and bioethics
- Roz Chast (born 1954), cartoonist
- Humayun Chaudhry (born 1965), physician and President and CEO of the Federation of State Medical Boards of the United States
- Tony Colorito (born 1964), football player for the Denver Broncos of the NFL
- Didi Conn (née Bernstein; born 1951), stage, screen, and television actress, who played Frenchy in the original cast of Grease
- John Corigliano (born 1938), Academy Award, Pulitzer Prize for Music, and Grammy Award-winning composer
- Matilda Cuomo (born 1931), former First Lady of New York.
- Richard Davidson (born 1951), professor of Psychology and Psychiatry at the University of Wisconsin–Madison; founder and Chair of the Center for Investigating Healthy Minds
- Carole Demas (born 1940, class of 1957), actress, singer, producer, and writer
- J. M. DeMatteis (born 1953), writer of comic books, television, and novels
- Veronica Driscoll (1926–1994), nurse and labor organizer
- Phil Dusenberry (1936–2007, class of 1954), advertising executive for the BBDO advertising agency.
- Hilly Elkins (1929–2010), theater and film producer
- Ramblin' Jack Elliott (born Elliot Charles Adnopoz, 1931, class of 1949), folk singer and performer
- Amaya Espinal (born 1999, class of 2017), nurse, model and winner of Love Island USA Season 7.
- Walter Ferguson (1930–2015; class of 1948), visual artist who painted at least two murals at Midwood
- Martin J. Fettman (born 1956; class of 1973), astronaut
- John Fitzgerald (born 1933), Major League Baseball pitcher
- Felice Frankel (born 1945), photographer of scientific images
- Stephen J. Friedman (1937–1996), film producer
- Stewart D. Friedman, author and professor at the Wharton School of Business at the University of Pennsylvania
- Gideon Gartner (born in Mandatory Palestine, 1935 – 2020), American businessman, industry analyst, investor, and philanthropist.
- Richard Grayson (born Richard Ginsberg; 1951), writer, political activist, performance artist, and perennial candidate.
- Henry Gross (born 1951), singer-songwriter; Sha Na Na
- Lawrence K. Grossman (1931–2018), head of PBS and NBC News
- Robert Grossman (1940–2018, class of 1957), visual artist
- Madeleine Grumet (born 1940; class of 1957), academic in curriculum theory and feminist theory
- Morty Gunty (1929–1984), comedian and actor
- Gerald Gutierrez (1950–2003), Tony Award-winning stage and film director
- Gabe Henry (born 1988), author and humorist
- Lee Israel (1939–2014, class of 1957), author, literary forger, and thief
- Hakeem Jeffries (born 1970, class of 1988), U.S. Congressman
- Barbara Joans (1935–2024), anthropologist
- June Jordan (1936–2002), poet
- Selna Kaplan (1927–2010), pediatric endocrinologist and a professor of pediatrics at the University of California, San Francisco
- Elihu Katz (1926–2021), American-Israeli sociologist, communication scientist, and professor at the University of Pennsylvania whose expertise was uses and gratifications theory
- Karl Katz (1929–2017), art historian, curator, and museum director
- Johnny Kelly (born 1968), drummer for Type O Negative, Danzig, A Pale Horse Named Death, Seventh Void
- Arthur Komar (1931–2011), theoretical physicist, specializing in general relativity and the search for quantum gravity
- Daniella Levine Cava (born 1955, class of 1973), first female/non-Hispanic Mayor of Miami-Dade County, Florida (2020)
- Rochelle Lazarus (born 1947), Chairman Emeritus of Ogilvy & Mather
- Ivan Leshinsky (born 1947), American-Israeli basketball player
- Emmanuel Lewis (born 1971, class of 1989), actor
- Michael Lynne (1941–2019), CEO of New Line Cinema, vintner
- Peter Mackler (1949–2008), journalist
- Robert Markowitz (born 1935), movie and television director
- Wentworth Miller (born 1972), Golden Globe Award-nominated actor (did not graduate)
- Joel Moses (1941–2022), Israeli-American MIT provost
- Eric Nadel (born 1951, class of 1968), Texas Rangers radio announcer since 1979
- Arthur Nersesian (born 1958), novelist, playwright, and poet
- Kevin Parker (born 1967), New York State Senator
- Byron Preiss (1953 - 2005), American writer, editor, and publisher.
- Irma S. Raker (née Steinberg, born 1938), lawyer and Judge of the Maryland Court of Appeals
- Adam Richman (born 1974), TV host of Man v. Food (Travel Channel)
- Kadary Richmond (born 2001), NBA basketball player for the Washington Wizards
- Neil Rosenshein (born 1947), operatic tenor
- Judy Rothman (née Rofé), Emmy Award-winning television writer, author, and lyricist
- Howard J. Rubenstein (1932–2020; class of 1949), public relations expert
- Safaree Samuels (born 1981; class of 1999), rapper, songwriter, and television personality
- Jack Sarfatti (born 1939; class of 1956), theoretical physicist
- Ruth Schwartz Cowan (born 1941), historian of science, technology and medicine, and professor emeritus at the University of Pennsylvania
- Andre-Michel Schub (born 1952), pianist
- Erich Segal (1937–2010, class of 1954), author, professor, Academy Award-nominated screenwriter
- Juliet Popper Shaffer (born 1932), psychologist, statistician, and statistics educator, professor emerita at the University of California, Berkeley
- James S. Shapiro (born 1955), Professor of English and Comparative Literature at Columbia University
- Mimi Sheraton (1926–2023, class of 1943), food critic
- Mitchell Silver, Commissioner of the New York City Department of Parks and Recreation
- Heather Simms (born 1970), actress
- Maxine Singer (1931–2024), geneticist, President Emerita of the Carnegie Institution of Washington
- Shaun Smith (born 1981), NFL football player
- Valerie Smith (born 1956), Professor Emeritus, Princeton University; President, Swarthmore College
- Stephen J. Solarz (1940–2010, class of 1958), U.S. Congressman (Brooklyn, NY), 1975–93
- Ellen Spolsky, Professor Emerita of English at Bar-Ilan University, Israel
- Jason Starr (born 1966), novelist
- Chris Stein (born 1950), guitarist from rock band Blondie
- Jordan G. Stone, TV producer - created Discovery series Stunt Junkies
- Ronald Sukenick (1932–2004), writer and literary theorist
- Sy Syms (born Seymour Merinsky, 1926–2009, class of 1943), businessman and philanthropist
- Bill Thompson (born 1953, class of 1970), New York City Comptroller
- Elliot Tiber (born Eliyahu Teichberg, 1935–2016), artist and screenwriter, helped arrange Woodstock festival in Bethel, New York
- Amirah Vann (born 1980), actress and singer
- Richard Warshak (born 1949, class of 1966), psychologist, author, and public speaker
- Myron Weiner (1931–1999), political scientist and scholar of South Asia, MIT
- Sheila Wellington, author, professor, and President of Catalyst
- Sean Wilentz (born 1951), Professor of History, Princeton University
- Victor Williams (born 1970), actor
- Zach Zarba (born 1975), NBA referee
- Zombie Juice (born Antonio Lewis, born 1990), rapper, member of Flatbush ZOMBiES.
- Fred Zarr (born Brooklyn, 1955), musician, record producer, studio keyboards & synthesist, arranger & composer.

=== Notable staff ===
- Herb Bernstein, record producer, composer, arranger, and conductor.
