= John Bobbitt =

John Bobbitt may refer to:

- John Wayne Bobbitt (born 1967), American penile amputee
- John Franklin Bobbitt (1876–1956), American educationist
