= Master of Education =

Graduate academic degree in education

The Master of Education (MEd or M.Ed. or Ed.M.; Latin Magister Educationis or Educationis Magister) is a master's degree awarded by universities in many countries. This degree in education often includes the following majors: curriculum and instruction, counseling, school psychology, and administration. It is often conferred for educators advancing in their field. Similar degrees (providing qualifications for similar careers) include the Master of Arts in Education (MAEd or M.A.Ed. or M.A.E.) and the Master of Science in Education (M.S.Ed. or MScEd or M.Sc.Ed. or M.S.E.).

== Categories of study ==
Typical programs branch into one of several categories:

=== Curriculum and instruction/curriculum and teaching ===
This is typically the area to advance knowledge of, and professional practice in, teaching and learning. Coursework in this field generally focuses on teaching, public service, and scholarship. Often at the master's level, curriculum and instruction majors (or curriculum and teaching at some schools) participate in educational research. This major is designed often for preparation to enter educational careers in schools, including classroom teaching.

=== Counselor education ===
This is typically the area where students study to become mental health professionals and work toward state licensure in mental health counseling. Customarily, state licensure requires 60 credit hours on a semester system.

=== School counseling ===
Candidates in school counseling typically study psychology, sociology, or social work as undergraduates. The master's degree, in addition to advanced courses of study, certifies an individual for employment as a school counselor.

=== Neuroscience interdisciplinary degree in education ===
Harvard University is notable for having an interdisciplinary neuroscience master's degree given as an M.Ed. The degree may have little instruction in teaching, with education referring to the learning process in humans versus the profession or institution of education.

=== Academic enrichment ===
This is typically the area where teachers are increasing their knowledge in their specific field or branching to another area within teaching. Examples are subject related, such as mathematics, social studies, or science, or tiers of school, such as elementary or high school. These teachers may be maintaining their certification or moving into a more marketable bracket.

=== Higher education and student affairs ===
Coursework in this area is aimed at the study of colleges and universities (higher education) or the administrative operations of higher education (student affairs) in specific programmatic elements.

=== Adult education ===
This focuses on the teaching of individuals 18 years or older. Some classes, such as adult literacy, high school diploma programs, English as a second language, parent education, and some job training classes, are sponsored by the government. Others, such as art and dance classes are fee-based. A B.Ed. degree or teacher's certificate is not usually a requirement for admission to an adult education program.

=== Special education ===
This degree designed to develop the capabilities and resources of educators of children who require special education (for example, students with autism spectrum disorders, students with intellectual disabilities).

=== Religious education ===
A terminal degree in preparation for teaching religious studies.

=== Media and technology ===
The purpose of the Master of Education (M.Ed.) in media & technology is to address the learner in the classroom and requires integration of instructional design principles into multimedia presentations with an emphasis in assessment. As classroom instructors across a range of academic disciplines integrate technology into their classrooms, there is an expanding need to have pedagogy and skills that drive this integration. Some will use this degree to design instructional technologies, and others will serve as technology facilitators in schools.

=== Prep for Ed.D. or Ph.D. ===
This is typically the area where teachers study for continuing work into the doctoral programs. Candidates in this area would study specific educational issues and often begin educational research in preparation for doctoral work. This is the broadest area of master's work for education.

== Use in North America ==
Most states and provinces require a master's-level degree and the certificate that goes with that work to be hired for educational administration (principal, assistant or vice-principal, dean, consultant, etc.) or for licensure as a professional counselor (i.e., caseworker, therapist, community counselor, rehabilitation counselor). For licensure as a professional counselor, one needs a M.Ed., in counseling and an approved internship in which half the time of the internship must be in direct service to the client. The superintendent level in educational administration typically requires doctoral-level work to be completed. Another issue is that most states require continuing course work in order for counselors (especially since new CACREP requirements were implemented) to maintain their licensure. Admission into a master's-level program typically requires a bachelor's degree (BS, BA, or B.Ed.) in education or in the specific field in which the teacher would be teaching, and several years' experience in an educational or mental health setting.

== See also ==
- Bachelor of Education
- Doctor of Education
- Council for the Accreditation of Educator Preparation
