= EDUindex =

The EDUindex is a Correlation coefficient representing the relevancy of Curriculum to post-educational objectives, particularly employability. An EDUindex Gap Analysis provides missing, relevant curriculum relative to employment opportunity within a representative area. Representative areas may include geographic regions, states, cities, school districts or specific schools. Analysis is regularly conducted using zip code sets.

In 1918, John Franklin Bobbitt said that curriculum, as an idea, has its roots in the Latin word for horse race-course, explaining the curriculum as the course of deeds and experiences through which children become the adults they should be, for success in adult society. EDUindex, Inc. developed the EDUindex to identify and promote relevance in education.

The EDUindex is a correlation of curricular subjects taught in a particular school to skills as suggested by a pre-defined or custom selected target marketplace. Published class offerings represent the skills taught. The Classification of Secondary School Courses (CSSC) provides a general inventory of courses taught nationwide in the secondary school level (grades 9 through 12). Further detail is provided by High School Transcript Studies provided by the National Center for Education Statistics. Public, Charter, and Private School listings are accessed per geographical area to create a comprehensive data set of all schools and businesses within the analytical focus. Curriculum per School, District, etc. is published individually and is publicly available.

Standard databases like the North American Industry Classification System (NAICS) provide defined business focus. Business focus can be further refined into specific occupations and skill sets using Standard Occupational Classification System (SOC). Together these datasets provide information representing the skills offered and the occupational opportunities available within the designated target area.

The EDUindex, as a value, is expressed as a number from 0 to 1.0 with 1.0 representing a perfect match of curricular offering to target need. The value is determined using the Pearson product-moment correlation coefficient (sometimes referred to as the PMCC, and typically denoted by r) as a measure of the correlation (linear dependence) between two variables X and Y, giving a value between +1 and −1 inclusive. It is widely used in the sciences as a measure of the strength of linear dependence between two variables. It was developed by Karl Pearson from a similar but slightly different idea introduced by Francis Galton in the 1880s. The general correlation coefficient is sometimes called "Pearson's r." The EDUindex calculates Pearson's r for educational relevance by comparing the content of course offerings with the need for related skill sets within the same banded geographic area. Correlative results are weighted based on data volume for Scalar, comparative and presentation purposes.
