= Joseph J. Schwab =

American educationalist

Joseph Jackson Schwab (1909 – 1988) was an American educator, curriculum theorist, and university professor. He served as a professor of natural sciences and education at the University of Chicago and is regarded as one of the leading figures in curriculum theory during the second half of the twentieth century. Schwab is best known for his critique of technical approaches to curriculum development and for advancing the concept of the practical, which emphasizes deliberation and professional judgment in curriculum decision-making. He also made significant contributions to science education by promoting scientific inquiry as the foundation of science teaching and through his involvement with the Biological Sciences Curriculum Study (BSCS). His work has had a lasting influence on curriculum studies, science education, and liberal education.
