= Queer pedagogy =

Queer pedagogy (QP) is an academic discipline devoted to exploring the intersection between queer theory and critical pedagogy, which are both grounded in Marxist critical theory. It is also noted for challenging the so-called "compulsory cisheterosexual and normative structures, practices, and curricula" that marginalize or oppress non-heterosexual students and teachers.

== Practice ==
QP explores and interrogates the student/teacher relationship, the role of identities in the classroom, the role of eroticism in the teaching process, the nature of disciplines and curriculum, and the connection between the classroom and the broader community with a goal of being both a set of theoretical tools for pedagogical critique / critique of pedagogy and/or a set of practical tools for those doing pedagogical work.

The pedagogy focuses on the crisis of knowledge production that result from epistemological limits and regimes of power. Particularly, the pedagogy operates in a situation where the desire for knowledge is inhibited by the repetition of the heterosexual and queer normalization. One of the ways that these are addressed in this framework is by drawing attention to the unease and uncertainty regarding what one thinks and knows.

== History ==
According to William Pinar, a curriculum theorist at the University of British Columbia, homosexuality and pedagogy have been linked as far back as the ancient Greeks and Romans. Modern notions of queer theory in education, however, originate around 1981 with Pinar's "Understanding Curriculum as Gender Text," critiquing the way in which machisimo and masculinity plays out in Marxist educational theory. In 1982, Meredith Reiniger wrote about misogyny that had been internalized by her secondary English students. In 1983, James Sears wrote an article entitled "Sexuality: Taking off the Masks" for a journal called Changing Schools.

The term "queer pedagogy" itself, however, appears to have originated in 1993 with an article in the Canadian Journal of Education. This article was written by two Canadian professors, Mary Bryson (University of British Columbia) and Suzanne de Castell (Simon Fraser University), who were grappling with poststructuralist and essentialist theories of identity in the context of a classroom setting. They present various techniques that they tried, but eventually conclude that the task is both necessary and impossible, concluding: "Queer pedagogy it is indeed, that, after all, in trying to make a difference we seem only able to entrench essentialist boundaries which continue both to define and to divide us."

In 1995, Deborah Britzman wrote an article entitled "Is there a queer pedagogy-- Or, stop reading straight."

In 1998, as part of William Pinar's anthology Queer Theory in Education, the challenge of articulating a queer pedagogy was taken up by a doctoral student at York University, Susanne Luhmann. In "Queering/Querying Pedagogy? Or, Pedagogy is a Pretty Queer Thing" (part of a larger anthology on Queer Theory in Education), she asks questions such as, "Is a queer pedagogy about and for queer students or queer teachers? Is a queer pedagogy a question of queer curriculum? Or, is it about teaching methods adequate for queer content? Or, about queer learning and teaching-- and what would that mean? Moreover, is a queer pedagogy to become the house pedagogy of queer studies or is it about the queering of pedagogical theory?" She suggests that an "inquiry into the conditions that make learning possible or prevent learning" through exploration of the teacher/student relationships and "the conditions for understanding, or refusing, knowledge."

In 2002, Tanya Olson (who teaches Developmental English at Vance-Granville Community College) further explored the teacher/student relationship in an article in Bad Subjects, an online cultural studies journal. In this article, entitled "TA/TG: The Pedagogy of the Cross-Dressed", Olson compared the experience of being a butch woman and not knowing which restroom and whether one was male or female to use to the experience of being a Teaching Assistant (TA) and not being fully a student or a teacher, drawing on it for inspiration towards creating a new conception of pedagogy. She concludes, "Maybe re-defining TAs in the academy will help stop the sense of masquerade that currently characterizes their work. No matter how much they challenge accepted cultural standards or straddle societal binary divisions, everyone deserves a bathroom they can call home. From there we can create a pedagogy of the cross-dressed."

Building on Lee Edelman's work, including his book with Lauren Berlant, DePauw University professor Derek R. Ford theorizes a queer pedagogy of sinthomostudying in the Journal of Curriculum & Pedagogy, which "places us firmly in the gap that is both within and beyond the Symbolic" and "exposes and rejects the possibility of fastening the gap." He clarifies that Edelman's writing on education is actually about the pedagogy of learning, and demonstrates that learning is the pedagogical logic of capitalist futurity. For Ford, such a practice of studying is communist as it provides a break out of what Jodi Dean calls "communicative capitalism."

== Theoretical influences ==
- William Pinar
- Judith Butler
- Sue-Ellen Case
- Lee Edelman
- Michel Foucault
- Henry Giroux
- bell hooks
- Annamarie Jagose
- Eve Kosofsky Sedgwick
- Lois Banner
- Guy Hocquenghem
