= Barbara Joans =

American anthropologist (1935–2024)

- Born: Barbara Levinsohn; February 28, 1935; Brooklyn, New York City, New York, U. S.
- Died: March 6, 2024 (aged 89); Santa Cruz, California, U.S.
- Spouses: Irwin Schwartz (div. 1970); Kenneth Harmon (m. 1975)
- Children: 2

Barbara Joans (February 28, 1935 – March 6, 2024) was an American anthropologist who researched biker culture.

== Life ==
Joans was born in Brooklyn to business owner Rubin Levinsohn and junior high school teacher Eleanor (Davidson) Levinsohn. She attended Midwood High School, graduating in 1952. She went on to attend Brooklyn College, graduating in 1956 with a bachelor's degree in philosophy. By that year, she had also married her first husband, Irwin Schwartz. In 1965, she earned a master's degree in sociology and anthropology from New York University, and in 1974 a doctorate in anthropology from the Graduate Center of the City University of New York. Her doctoral thesis was on the Iroquois in Canada, while her doctoral dissertation was entitled "Women's Liberation Groups: Behavioral Anthropology".

She first worked as an instructor at The New School for Social Research in Greenwich Village, where she wrote anthropological papers on women's issues, such as menopause.

Beginning in the 1960s, Joans was involved with feminist activism in New York City. Prior to the passing of Roe V. Wade, she helped connect women wanting to terminate their pregnancies with illicit abortion providers. In 1970, she joined a one-day occupation of the editorial offices of the Ladies' Home Journal, where she and other protesters demanded "the opportunity to put out a "liberated" version of the magazine". The editor agreed to allow "eight pages of feminist writing to be published in a future edition".

That same year, Joans divorced Schwartz, began using the last name Joans, and moved to Northern California with her two sons. By 1974, Joans, her boyfriend Kenneth Harmon (d. 2021), and her two sons moved to Santa Cruz, where she began working at San Jose State University. There, Joans, who was straight, became the first professor to chair the university's Gay and Lesbian club. She later became a professor of anthropology at Merritt College in Oakland, going on to serve as chair of the school's anthropology department and as director of the Merritt Museum of Anthropology.

Joans became interested in biker culture in her 50s, after Harmon, now her husband, took her on some bike rides. At age 56, she bought her first motorcycle: a Honda Rebel. At age 60, she bought a Harley-Davidson Low Rider, which she nicknamed 'The Beast'. She joined the San Francisco biker group the Fog Hogs, and undertook research at motorcycle shops, bars, and festivals. She was particularly interested in women's participation in biker subculture. Joans also co-wrote a column, Bike Rest with BJ, for the free biker magazines Thunderpress.

She died at an assisted living facility in Santa Cruz on March 6, 2024, from cardiopulmonary failure. Her funeral, held on March 10, was officiated by an Orthodox rabbi.

== Publications ==
- Joans, Barbara (2001-08-03). Bike Lust: Harleys, Women, And American Society. University of Wisconsin Press. ISBN 978-0-299-17353-1.
- Joans, Barbara (2012-02-01). "Women Who Ride: The Bitch in the Back is Dead". In Bolin, Anne; Granskog, Jane E. (eds.). Athletic Intruders: Ethnographic Research on Women, Culture, and Exercise. State University of New York Press. ISBN 978-0-7914-8756-3.

=== Articles ===
- Joans, Barbara (1997-09-01). "Infighting in San Francisco: Anthropology in Family Court". Practicing Anthropology. 19 (4): 10–13. doi:10.17730/praa.19.4.k75411402577571w. ISSN 0888-4552.
- Joans, Barbara (2009-07-01). "The Girls Who Went Away: The Hidden History of Women Who Surrendered Children for Adoption in the Decades Before Roe v. Wade". The Oral History Review. 36 (2): 285–287. doi:10.1093/ohr/ohp061. ISSN 0094-0798.
