= James G. Henderson =

American academic

James G. Henderson (born November 12, 1945) is a full professor at the School of Teaching, Learning and Curriculum Studies at Kent State University. He co-founded an education journal and has written several books and articles on curriculum design. He created the curriculum structure known as 3S Understanding.

== Biography ==
Henderson received a B.A. in History from Dartmouth College, an M.A. in Philosophical Foundations of Education from the University of Wisconsin–Milwaukee, and an Ed.D. in Curriculum & Teaching Studies from Stanford University. He then became assistant professor at Roosevelt University, where he was promoted to associate professor; he originally came to Kent State at that rank, before being promoted to full professor in 1996. At Kent State, he became co-director of the Teacher Leader Endorsement Program in 2010. He was coordinator of curriculum and instruction, of their masters (M.Ed.), educational specialist (Ed.S.), and doctoral (Ph.D.) programs from 2003 to 2008.

Henderson created the concept of teaching for democratic living and the curriculum structure known as 3S Understanding. This structure emphasizes that teachers should encourage self-learning, social learning and subject matter when instructing their students. Henderson advances this model for students through the twelfth grade, but author Laurel Chehayl proposes that it can be used in postsecondary settings. Henderson has also promoted the concept of artistry in curriculum development. Henderson's 3S Understanding concept has been used to frame the study of delivery methods such as asynchronous online courses.

Henderson co-founded the Journal of Curriculum and Pedagogy with Patrick Slattery in 2004. He has been Section Editor of JCT: Journal of Curriculum Theorizing. He has written or co-written seven books; three of them have been translated into Chinese. He has served on the advisory board for the John Dewey Project on Progressive Education.

Paul Farber of Western Michigan University reviewed Henderson's book Reflective Teaching: Becoming an Inquiring Educator in the journal Reading Horizons. Farber said that several devices in the book "all provide numerous opportunities for discussion and commentary", but he found the book to be "thick with special terminology."

== Bibliography ==
- Henderson, George. America's Other Children: Public Schools Outside Suburbia. Norman: University of Oklahoma Press, 1971. According to WorldCat, the book is held in 542 libraries
- Henderson, James George. Reflective Teaching: Becoming an Inquiring Educator. New York: Macmillan, 1992.
  - Translated into Chinese by Muhua Li., as 反思教学 : 成为一位探究的教育者 = Reflecctive Teaching : Becoming an Inquiring Educator
- Henderson, James George, and Kathleen R. Kesson. Understanding Democratic Curriculum Leadership. New York: Teachers College Press, 1999. According to WorldCat, the book is held in 447 libraries
- Henderson, James George. Reflective Teaching: The Study of Your Constructivist Practices. Englewood Cliffs, N.J.: Merrill, 1996.
- Henderson, James George. Reflective Teaching: Professional Artistry Through Inquiry. Upper Saddle River, N.J.: Merrill/Prentice Hall, 2001.
- Henderson, James George, Richard D. Hawthorne, and Debra A. Stollenwerk. Transformative Curriculum Leadership. Upper Saddle River. N.J.: Merrill, 2000. According to WorldCat, the book is held in 353 libraries
  - Translated into Chinese by, Desen Heng, Sang Hun, and Xinjian Gao as Ge xin de ke cheng ling dao. Tai bei shi: Xue fu wen hua, 200
- Henderson, James George, and Kathleen R. Kesson. Curriculum Wisdom: Educational Decisions in Democratic Societies. Upper Saddle River, N.J.: Pearson/Merrill/Prentice Hall, 2004.
  - Translated into Chinese by Yan jia ping and Wang wei chen as 课程智慧 / Ke cheng zhi hui.
