= Peter Mackler =

American journalist (1949–2008)

- Born: August 22, 1949; Brooklyn, New York City, U.S.
- Died: June 20, 2008 (aged 58); Washington, D.C., U.S.
- Education: Brooklyn College
- Occupation: Journalist
- Employers: United Press International (1973-1979); Agence France-Presse (1979-2008)
- Spouse: Catherine Antoine
- Children: 2

Peter Mackler (August 22, 1949 – June 20, 2008) was an American journalist. He worked for Agence France-Presse (AFP) for almost thirty years, was instrumental in developing the AFP's English-language service, and at the time of death was the chief editor for North America. The Peter Mackler Award for Courageous and Ethical Journalism was set up in his name and given out each year from 2009 to 2020.

== Early life and education ==
Mackler grew up in Flatbush in Brooklyn, New York, in a Jewish family. He attended Midwood High School, and then Brooklyn College, where he took psychology and graduated in 1971. Before he got into journalism, Mackler spent a few years in Brooklyn working with autistic and schizophrenic children as a counselor.

== Career ==
Mackler started with a job at United Press International in New York in 1973, reporting on crime, fires, and everyday city politics. He moved to AFP six years later. The agency put him on its Hong Kong editing desk in 1982, then made him bureau chief in Sydney and afterwards in Singapore. His work in Asia helped expand the English dispatch influence of AFP. During the 1991 Gulf War, colleagues informally referred to him as "General Mackler" after he got AFP correspondents into Kuwait City hours ahead of the U.S. Army.

Mackler subsequently worked in Brussels and became chief editor in Washington in 1994, later serving as deputy regional director. He was then appointed senior reporter based in Paris to cover terrorism, reporting on events such as the September 11 attack and the subsequent war in Afghanistan. Over the rest of his career, he reported on or directed coverage of both Iraq wars, the wars in Bosnia and Kosovo, the Palestinian intifada, and elections in the U.S. and the Philippines. In 2004, he returned to Washington to cover the State Department and was named chief editor for North America in 2006.

=== Journalism training programs ===
In 1999, Mackler established Project Plato, a journalism program at the Duke Ellington School of the Arts in Washington, D.C. He pitched it as a way of teaching what he called "life skills" – writing clearly, reading well, doing your own research – to high school students whether or not they ended up becoming reporters. In 2004, he founded a non-profit Global Media Forum organization based on the same model, and went on to train journalists in Lebanon, Iran, Malaysia and Cyprus.

== Death ==
Mackler suffered an apparent heart attack while at work at the Washington AFP bureau on June 20, 2008. He was pronounced dead later that day at George Washington University Hospital. He was survived by his wife of 31 years, Catherine Antoine (then a senior editor at Radio Free Asia Online), and two daughters, Camille and Lauren.

== Peter Mackler Award ==
After his death, the family and former colleagues set up the Peter Mackler Award for Courageous and Ethical Journalism. It was run by the transformed non-profit Global Media Forum Training Group (GMFTG) and the U.S. office of Reporters Without Borders, with backing from AFP. The 2009 prize went to the jailed Sri Lankan journalist J. S. Tissainayagam. Later winners came from Russia, Italy, Honduras, Kazakhstan, Sudan, Pakistan, Syria, Burundi, Mexico and Montenegro. In total, it was given twelve times, ending in 2020 with the Kashmiri photojournalist Masrat Zahra. Since post-pandemic GMFTG dissolution in 2022, its mission and assets were merged into a new program by the Freedom House oriented towards political prisoners.
