= Curriculum theory =

Academic discipline

Curriculum theory (CT) is an academic discipline devoted to examining and shaping educational curricula. There are many interpretations of CT, being as narrow as the dynamics of the learning process of one child in a classroom to the lifelong learning path an individual takes. CT can be approached from the educational, philosophical, psychological and sociological perspectives. James MacDonald states "one central concern of theorists is identifying the fundamental unit of curriculum with which to build conceptual systems. Whether this be rational decisions, action processes, language patterns, or any other potential unit has not been agreed upon by the theorists." Curriculum theory is fundamentally concerned with values, the historical analysis of curriculum, ways of viewing current educational curriculum and policy decisions, and theorizing about the curricula of the future.

Pinar defines the contemporary field of curriculum theory as "the effort to understand curriculum as a symbolic representation".

The first mention of the word "curriculum" in university records was in 1582, at the University of Leiden, Holland: "having completed the curriculum of his studies". However, curriculum theory as a field of study is thought to have been initiated with the publication of The Yale Report on the Defense of the Classics in 1828, which promoted the study of a classical curriculum, including Latin and Greek, by rote memorization.

== Faculty psychology ==
The school of faculty psychology, dominating the field from 1860-1890 in the United States, believed that the brain was a muscle that could be improved by the exercise of memorization (with comprehension a secondary consideration). This supports the classical theory, which previously emphasized a method of teaching school subjects using memorization and recitation as primary instructional tools. The theory itself claims three constituent faculties or power:

- the presence of will or volition, which enables human beings to act;
- the emotions, which pertains to the affections and passions that enable human beings to experience pleasure, pain, love, and hate; and,
- the intellect or understanding, which is the foundation of human rationality that enables him to make judgments and comprehend meanings.

The idea is that education should expand the faculty of the mind and this is achieved through the key concepts of discipline and furniture. The faculty theory, which steered curriculum policy for elementary, secondary, and high schools, was institutionalized by three committees appointed by the National Education Association (NEA) in the 1890s to follow faculty psychology principles: the Committee of Ten on Secondary School Studies (1893), the Committee of Fifteen on Elementary Education (1895) and the Committee on College Entrance Requirements.

== The Herbartians ==
Different schools of Curriculum Theory developed as a reaction to the classicism of faculty psychology, including the Herbartians, who organized the Herbart Club in 1892, and later the National Herbart Society (1895-1899). Their philosophy was based on the thoughts of Johann Friedrich Herbart, a German philosopher, psychologist and educator, who believed that "the mere memorizing of isolated facts, which had characterized school instruction for ages, had little value of either educational or moral ends".

== The social efficiency movement ==
The publication of John Bobbitt's The Curricula in 1918 took the prevalent industrial revolutionary concepts of experimental science and social efficiency and applied them to the classroom. He believed that "curriculum must directly and specifically prepare students for tasks in the adult world". He also believed that "human life...consists in the performance of specific activities. Education that prepares for life is one that prepares definitely and adequately for these specific activities." From this idea, he suggested that curriculum was a series of experiences that children have in order to meet "objectives," or abilities and habits that people need for particular activities.

Other famous theorists of this movement included Edward L. Thorndyke (1874-1949), the father of experimental psychology in education, Frederick Winslow Taylor (1856-1915), with his theory of scientific management, David Snedden, an educational sociologist who promoted social efficiency and vocational education, and W. W. Charters (1875-1952), a teacher educator who felt that "curriculum was comprised of those methods by which objectives are determined". By using education as an efficiency tool, these theorists believed that society could be controlled. Students were scientifically evaluated by testing (such as IQ tests), and educated towards their predicted role in society. This involved the introduction of vocational and junior high schools to address the curriculum designed around specific life activities that correlated with each student's determined societal future. The socially efficient curriculum consisted of minute parts or tasks that together formed a bigger concept.

== The progressive reform movement ==
The progressive reform movement began in the late 1870s with the work of Colonel Francis Parker, but is most identified with John Dewey, and also John Mayer Rice and Lester Frank Ward. Dewey's 1899 book The School and Society is often credited with starting the movement. These reformers felt that curriculum should be child driven and at the child's present capacity level. To aid in understanding the relationship of curriculum and child, Dewey described curriculum as, "a map, a summary, an arranged and orderly view of previous experiences, serves as a guide to future experience; it gives direction; it facilitates control; it economizes effort, preventing useless wandering, and pointing out the paths which lead most quickly and most certainly to a desired result". He envisioned "the child and the curriculum are simply two limits which define a single process".

The Social Efficiency and Progressive Reform movements were rivals throughout the 1920s in the United States, with the 1930s belonging to the Progressives, or a curriculum combining aspects of both. Ralph W. Tyler's Basic Principles of Curriculum and Instruction (1949) swung the pendulum of curriculum theory away from child centeredness toward more generalized behaviors.

Tyler's theory was based on four fundamental questions which became known as the Tyler Rationale:

1. What educational purposes should the school seek to attain?
2. What educational experiences can be provided that are likely to attain these purposes?
3. How can these educational experiences be effectively organized?
4. How can we determine whether these purposes are being attained?

== The multicultural education movement ==
There is a racial crisis in America, which is exacerbated by the widening gap between the rich and the poor. In order to address this gap within the multicultural education movement there is a body of knowledge which argues for the need to reconceptualise, re-envision, and rethink American schooling. Numerous authors advocate the need for fundamental changes in the educational system which acknowledges that there is a plurality within teaching and learning for students of diversity. Current research suggests that educational structure is oppressive to students of diversity and is an obstacle to integration into society and student achievement. Current multicultural education theory suggests that curriculum and institutional change is required to support the development of students from diverse ethnic and cultural backgrounds. This is a controversial view but multicultural education argues that traditional curriculum does not adequately represent the history of the non dominant group. Nieto (1999) supports this concern for students who do not belong to the dominant group and seem to have challenging curriculum experiences that conflict with their personal cultural identity and their wider community reference groups.

== Sputnik and the National Defense Act ==
The launch of Sputnik in 1957 created a focus on science and math in the United States curriculum. Admiral Hyman Rickover accused the American public of indifference to intellectual achievement. "Our schools must return to the tradition of formal education in Western civilization-transmission of cultural heritage, and preparation for life through rigorous intellectual training of young minds to think clearly, logically, and independently". The result was a return to curricula similar to the classicists of the 1890s and the modern birth of the traditionalists, with massive federal funding for curriculum development provided by the National Defense Act of 1958.

== Reconceptualized curriculum ==
Joseph J. Schwab was instrumental in provoking curriculum developers to think beyond the traditionalist approach. In his 1969 paper "The Practical: A Language for Curriculum" he declared the curriculum field "moribund". This, plus the social unrest of the 1960s and '70s stirred a new movement of "reconceptualization" of curricula. A group of theorists, including James Macdonald, Dwayne Huebner, Ross Mooney, Herbert M. Kliebard, Paul Klohr, Michael Apple, W.F. Pinar, and others, created ways of thinking about curriculum and its role in the academy, in schools, and in society in general. Their approach included perspectives from the social, racial, gender, phenomenological, political, autobiographical and theological points of view.

== Today ==
W.F. Pinar describes the present field "balkanized...divided into relatively separate fiefdoms or sectors of scholarship, each usually ignoring the other except for occasional criticism." The top-down governmental control of educational curriculum in the Anglophone world, including the United States, has been criticized as being "ahistorical and atheoretical, and as a result prone to difficult problems in its implementation". But there are theorists who are looking beyond curriculum as "simply as a collection of study plans, syllabi, and teaching subjects. Instead, the curriculum becomes the outcome of a process reflecting a political and societal agreement about the what, why, and how of education for the desired society of the future."

== See also ==
- Bias in curricula
- Curriculum studies
