= Michael Apple =

Educational theorist (born 1942)

Michael W. Apple

Michael W. Apple (born August 20, 1942) is an educational theorist specialized on education and power, cultural politics, curriculum theory and research, critical teaching, and the development of democratic schools.

Apple is John Bascom Professor Emeritus of Curriculum and Instruction and Educational Policy Studies at the University of Wisconsin–Madison School of Education, where he taught from 1970-2018. Prior to completing his Ed.D. at Teachers College, Columbia University in 1970, Apple taught in elementary and secondary schools in New Jersey, where he grew up, as well as served as the president of his teachers' union. For more than three decades Apple has worked with educators, unions, dissident groups, and governments throughout the world on changing educational policy and practice towards critical pedagogy.

== Bibliography ==
Selected works:

- Can education change society? New York: Routledge, 2013.
- Education and power. reissued 2nd edition. New York: Routledge, 2012.
- Global crises, social justice, and education. New York: Routledge, 2010.
- The Routledge international handbook of sociology of education. New York: Routledge, 2010.
- The Routledge international handbook of critical education. New York: Routledge, 2009.
- Democratic schools. 2nd edition. Portsmouth, NH: Heinemann, 2007. With James A. Beane.
- Educating the "right" way: Markets, standards, God, and inequality. 2nd edition. New York: Routledge, 2006.
- Ideology and curriculum. 25th anniversary 3rd edition. New York: Routledge, 2004.
- The state and politics of education. New York: Routledge, 2003.
- Official knowledge: Democratic knowledge in a conservative age. 2nd edition. New York: Routledge, 2000.
- Cultural politics and education. New York: Teachers College Press, 1996.
- The Curriculum: Problems, Politics, and Possibilities (Edited with Landon Beyer). Albany: State University of New York Press, 1988.
- Teachers and Texts: A Political Economy of Class and Gender Relations in Education. New York: Routledge and Kegan Paul, 1986.
- Ideology and Practice in Schooling (Edited with Lois Weis). Philadelphia: Temple University Press, 1983.
- Culture and Economic Reproduction in Education (Edited). Boston: Routledge and Kegan Paul, 1982.
- Education and Power. Boston: Routledge and Kegan Paul, 1982.
- Ideology and Curriculum. Boston: Routledge and Kegan Paul, 1979.
- Schooling and the Rights of Children (Edited with Vernon F. Haubrich). Berkeley: McCutchan, 1975.
- Educational Evaluation: Analysis and Responsibility (Edited with Michael J. Subkoviak and Henry S. Lufler Jr.). Berkeley: McCutchan, 1974.

== See also ==
- Critical pedagogy
