= Emergent curriculum =

Philosophy of teaching

Emergent curriculum is a philosophy of teaching and a way of planning a children's curriculum that focuses on being responsive to their interests. The goal is to create meaningful learning experiences for the children.

Emergent curriculum can be practiced with children at any grade level. It prioritizes:

- active participation by students
- relationship-building among students
- flexible and adaptable methods
- inquiry by students
- play-based learning by students

Emergent curriculum is child-initiated, collaborative and responsive to the children's needs. Proponents state that knowledge of the children is the key to success in any emergent curriculum.

Planning an emergent curriculum requires:

- observation
- documentation
- creative brainstorming
- flexibility
- patience

Emergent curriculum starts with the observation of the children for insight into their interests. Additionally, content is influenced by values held for the children's learning by the school, community, family and culture. The classroom typically consists of learning centres that expand and facilitate children's learning and encourage independent learning skills.

== Teacher as facilitator of learning ==
=== Teacher roles ===
Teachers who employ emergent curriculum understand that the trajectory of learning happens as a consequence of the children's genuine interest, response, and connection to the subject. In order for this to happen, the teacher must consider their position as a facilitator in the classroom.

The facilitator role for the teacher involves careful observations of the children and their play as well as flexibility and creativity in order to develop learning opportunities that align with their interests.

Carolyn Edwards notes:

“The teachers honestly do not know where the group will end up. Although this openness adds a dimension of difficulty to their work, it also makes it more exciting.”

Teachers act as researchers who are constantly collecting data, implementing strategies and assessing their outcomes. Success in implementing emergent curriculum requires that the teacher have a curious disposition about children and their learning.

It is the role of the teacher to be a participant-observer in the children's play. These programs give power to children's voices and are consistently scaffolding their learning. The teacher is constantly going through the process of observing and documenting, planning learning experiences, implementing plans, documenting and beginning the cycle again.

In these emergent curriculum settings, teachers will often implement some educational initiatives For example, learning is viewed as a process-oriented experience where children are praised for their effort rather than the final product. Additionally, children in these settings are given options and choice about how they wish to spend their time, choose their activities and utilize learning centres. This is believed to develop curiosity, initiative, self-direction and persistence.

=== Changes in curriculum ===
Because the emergent curriculum is continually changing, developing and growing, teachers need to allot time to reflect on their observations and strategies implemented. One way to engage in reflection is through discussion with colleagues. Reflection allows the teacher to think about what happens next in the child's learning, how to proceed, and what to look for in future observations.

Teachers must be aware of their own knowledge and where it is lacking. This type of environment can lead to investigations in an unlimited number of directions. Teachers are also individuals with interests and passions, and sharing these with the class can provide a great opportunity to model knowledge and enthusiasm.

Emergent curriculum programs are meant to be culturally responsive and inclusive in nature, so that all children are able to work at their own pace. To help facilitate this, teachers follow the children's lead, expand on their interests, provide meaningful and developmentally appropriate materials, and promote independent learning skills.

== Planning an emergent curriculum ==
=== Activities ===
1. Once teachers see an interest “emerging” among their students, they brainstorm ways to study the topic in depth.
2. From these observations and brainstorming, the teacher comes up with activities that complement and build upon the emerging interest, with opportunities for play at multiple ability levels.
3. Once activities have been implemented, the teacher observes the children's use of them, constantly modifying them to accommodate increasing interest or change in direction of the learning.
4. The teacher documents these observations and reflects on the effectiveness of the activities.

Then the process begins again. The teacher may be at different levels of this planning cycle for multiple activities or learning outcomes at once.

=== Learning plans ===
In emergent curriculum settings, learning plans are often more of a loose outline. This because success in the program often generates spontaneous deterrence by students to plans to support engagement.

Webbing is often used for planning because of its flexible nature. A web doesn't show everything that will be learned, it shows many things that could be learned as well as connections to curriculum expectations. However, it is important to use the web as a tool to open the teacher to possibilities not a “plan.” Teachers brainstorm many possibilities for study sparked from the particular interest, not as a plan but more as a ‘road map’ as one teacher put it: To get a plan, we chose an idea and brainstormed ways that children could play it – hands-on activities we could provide. Putting all the activities on a web gives you a road map full of possible journeys.

An idea for a curriculum topic may be sparked by things, people, events in the environment, issues that arise in the classroom, etc.

For instance, a teacher may overhear a group of students having a discussion about insects that leads to the class sitting down and coming up with a web topic that explores all the possible directions the class could go in to learn about insects. Ideas may also be sparked by offering experiences like a walk in the neighborhood, visiting local businesses, or reading books.

=== Classrooms ===
For emergent curriculum, classrooms are often organized into core curriculum areas, where activities may have a curricular theme while following student interest.

For example, while students are demonstrating an interest in restaurants, the literacy area may allow opportunity to write customer orders while the math area may have plastic money for the children to experiment with.

These centres are meant to encourage active participation with the content. In emergent curriculum settings, there should be opportunity to:

- involve all the senses
- challenge creativity
- hear and use oral and written language
- explore art media
- practice solving interpersonal problems
- conduct investigations and ask questions
- explore and order material
- acquire various physical skills

Teachers see learning as a process through which children first engage in exploration and physical action which then leads to mastery of skills. Some researchers argue that this method of planning is more effective for learning because it relies on the intrinsic motivation of students, therefore facilitating increased engagement with the material. However, because of this, it is normal to have multiple children or groups interested in completely different content. This makes documentation and preparation very important.

Emergent learning classrooms still maintain much of the structure of a regular classroom. It is important for children to still experience schedule and organization. Therefore, in these classrooms you will often still find large and small group instructional times, but the implementation of them is more flexible.

== The learning environment ==
Because emergent curriculum programs emphasize independence and persistence in their programs, learning centres are typically set up in very particular ways.

- Items and materials that are stored are easily accessible to the children visually and physically.
- Things are usually labeled with words and pictures to assist children, and clear storage containers are preferred.

Students can be seen working in a variety of social environments. The learning environment should offer opportunities to work in groups of all different sizes, as well as individually. Students are also given opportunities to experience materials in different ways, such as quiet reading corners and dramatic play areas.

"Reggio Emilia" schools are an example of early childhood services that use an emergent approach.

== Documentation ==
Documentation is a very important and very time-consuming aspect of this type of programming. Because teachers are held accountable to parents, licensing boards and colleagues, it is necessary that thorough documentation is kept.

=== Documentation for observation and assessment ===
Because of the reliance on observational methods to inform planning and assessment, it is crucial for teachers to have strategies in place to expedite the process. Some examples of tools used by teachers are:

- sticky notes
- observation baskets around the room to collect small anecdotal notes
- file folder systems for each student or area of the classroom
- clipboards
- digital recorders
- photography
- video recording
- audio recording

These methods allow learning to become visually represented and are good for reflection and validation of methods.

These strategies can be effective in ensuring proper assessment procedures. The use of student portfolios can be a way to assess learning and share it with parents/guardians. Additionally, the use of pre populated data collection sheets can be helpful to keep good records.

=== Documentation for planning ===
Use of webs and other graphic organizers can be a good way to demonstrate how the students are being exposed to curriculum expectations and brainstorm related ideas. Keeping track of interest paths that develop in the classroom can help teachers demonstrate the process of learning, revise and reflect on it and develop future directions.

Each learning or interest centre in the classroom usually has its own plan, as well as activities facilitated by the teacher.

=== Documentation for Students ===
Emergent curriculum involved students being collaborative partners in their learning, therefore it is important to incorporate children in displaying and documenting their learning. Some strategies teachers can use for this are:

- audio and visual recordings
- samples of children's work
- photos
- learning logs
- display boards

These approaches can help students develop pride in their work, show off skills to parents/guardians, and display their interests. These processes are not static, rather these projects grow as learning develops.
