= Ellen Spolsky =

- Born: New York City, New York, U.S.
- Title: Professor Emerita of English at Bar-Ilan University
- Spouse: Bernard Spolsky

Academic background
- Education: Smith College; McGill University (BA, 1964); Indiana University Bloomington (MA, 1967; PhD, 1969)

Academic work
- Discipline: Literary theory, literary criticism, cognitive cultural theory
- Institutions: University of New Mexico; Bar-Ilan University
- Notable works: Gaps in Nature: Literary Interpretation and the Modular Mind; Satisfying Skepticism: Embodied Knowledge in the Early Modern World; Word vs Image: Cognitive Hunger in Shakespeare's England

Ellen Spolsky is Professor Emerita of English at Bar-Ilan University, Israel. She is a literary scholar and theorist who has published several monographs that deal with topics such as early English literary history, Shakespeare, history of literary theory, word and image relations, cognitive cultural theory, iconotropism, performance theory, and some aspects of evolutionary literary theory (Darwinian literary studies). Her books and essays discuss both the universal and historically local aspects of Renaissance art, poetry and drama.

== Early life and education ==
Ellen Spolsky was born in New York City and attended public schools in the area for her primary education, graduating from Midwood High School. She studied at Smith College and eventually graduated with honors from McGill University in Montreal, Canada in 1964 with a Bachelor of Arts in English.

Spolsky then moved to Indiana University Bloomington for graduate school where she received her M.A. in 1967 and her Ph.D. in 1969, both in English and Comparative Literature. At this time, the Indiana University English Department, like other English Departments during this period, was highly immersed in New Criticism with very few theorists proposing alternate methods of analyzing literature. The Indiana University Linguists Department, at that time, was alive with theoretical arguments. The senior faculty, many world experts in their fields, were challenged by the younger scholars who championed the generative linguistics of Noam Chomsky. Spolsky began to study these linguistic approaches by attending the weekly "Ethno-Linguistic Seminar" with her husband, Bernard Spolsky, who had recently been appointed to the Linguistics department.

Although Spolsky found these lectures challenging to understand at first, she listened attentively and remembered whatever details that she could. After these lectures, the couple attended gatherings at the home of Professors Charles and Flo Voegelin in order to discuss the cross-disciplinary applications of the linguistic theory from the lectures, an experience which inspired Spolsky to go beyond the limitations of New Criticism which were the norm in most departments of English and to integrate new theoretical ideas into her work. This linguistic influence became a part of Spolsky's dissertation which was an early semantic analysis of Old English poetry from the Exeter Book. An analysis which, untraditionally, included linguistic features such as charts in Spolsky's dissertation appendix. Because Spolsky's dissertation included these newer linguistic approaches rather than the more traditional and dominant New Critical approaches, Spolsky experienced some disheartening challenges to her ideas, causing some discomfort during her oral defense. Her dissertation was approved, however, and she received her Ph.D. from Indiana University.

== Career ==
After receiving her Ph.D. Ellen Spolsky was appointed as an assistant professor at the University of New Mexico, Albuquerque, where she taught from 1968 until 1980 . While at the University of New Mexico, Spolsky began to forge her scholarly identity as a Literary Theorist, a pursuit that was still relatively new. She published her first book The Bounds of Interpretation: Linguistic Theory and Literary Text in 1986, a book on integrative techniques that she co-wrote with Ellen Schauber, a Chomsky scholar and MIT graduate, and at the time of writing, a member of the Linguistics Department at Northwestern University.

Spolsky moved with her family to Israel in 1980, where her husband, Bernard, was appointed Professor and she was appointed Senior Lecturer, both in the Department of English Literature and Linguistics at Bar-Ilan University in Ramat Gan, Israel, where she taught from 1980 until 2010. She is now a Professor Emerita. During her time teaching at Bar-Ilan, she was the second director of The Lechter Institute of Literary Research, succeeding its founder, Professor Harold Fisch, a position that she held from 1985 until 2004

== Influences ==
Spolsky was influenced by the semantic works of Ray Jackendoff, particularly A Generative Theory of Tonal Music by Fred Lerdahl and Ray Jackendoff, and Semantics and Cognition by Ray Jackendoff. Also, in her book Satisfying Skepticism, Spolsky frequently references and responds to the research of American philosopher, Stanley Cavell, referencing seven of his works in her book. In addition to her scholarly monographs, she has edited several collections of essays emerging from conferences sponsored by the Lechter Institute at Bar-Ilan. She has also written some highly influential essays, several of which are detailed below.

== Books ==
- The Bounds of Interpretation: Linguistic Theory and Literary Text. co-author, Ellen Schauber, Ellen Spolsky Stanford University Press, 1986.
- The Uses of Adversity: Failure and Accommodation in Reader Response. Bucknell University Press, 1990 (editor and contributor)
- Gaps in Nature: Literary Interpretation and the Modular Mind SUNY Pr, was 1993 an early text for cognitive literary studies
- Summoning: Ideas of the Covenant and Interpretive Theory. SUNY University Press, 1993 (Editor)
- The Judgment of Susanna: Authority and Witness, Scholars Press, 1996 (editor and contributor)
- Satisfying Skepticism: Embodied Knowledge in the Early Modern World (Ashgate, 2001) discusses the popularity of country life and its relationship to the deprivations of Reformation iconoclasm, with examples from to Shakespeare, Sidney, Michelangelo, and in Dutch post-Reformation art.
- The Work of Fiction: Cognition, Culture, and Complexity Ashgate, 2004 (Alan Richardson and Ellen Spolsky, eds).
- Iconotropism: Turning Toward Pictures. Ellen Spolsky (editor and contributor), Ilana Bing (contributor), Bucknell University Press 2004
- Word vs Image: Cognitive Hunger in Shakespeare’s England (Palgrave Macmillan, 2007) explores literature and art, particularly the grotesque, as meeting the intellectual anxieties of Christians after the Protestant Reformation.
- "The Contracts of Fiction: Cognition, Culture, Community, Oxford University Press, 2015

== Satisfying Skepticism ==
In Satisfying Skepticism, Ellen Spolsky explores the skepticism coming from the conflict between different ways of knowing that occurred during the Reformation, particularly regarding how much an icon could be trusted as a source of truth. While Catholics asserted the value of religious icons as a source of valuable knowledge, Protestants were wary of trusting images and asserted the power of scripture alone as the source of knowledge. In this period fraught with concerns about the power of sight and imagery, Spolsky notes cases such as William Shakespeare’s Othello which show how sight and vision provide overlapping, but ultimately incomplete knowledge of the world. Spolsky also presents pastoral literature and panoramic paintings in order to show how visual works which distanced themselves from intellectualism and didacticism provided solace by offering muted knowledge to those in the midst of reformation conflicts regarding word and image.

In addition to noting the specific conditions of skepticism that occurred during the reformation era which was concerned about the gaps between word and image, Spolsky notes that the mind itself creates a space for skepticism because it brings together multiple and occasionally even contradictory forms of knowledge. As Spolsky observes: "We habitually attempt to secure knowledge more firmly by adding the kinds of knowledge…Thus if we do not believe what we hear, we seek to see; if we cannot believe what we hear and see, we seek to touch. It seems natural to try and pile up the evidence in this way". In spite of the mind's attempt to gather multiple sources of knowledge, particularly in areas of extreme doubt, it is the incompleteness of this knowledge and the places where the differing forms of sense evidence contradict which produce further doubt. The mind fills in these gaps in the same way that it offers an individual a complete sense of vision even though each eye only offers a partial picture and even the combined functioning of both eyes includes blind spots.

Because the sense input offered to the brain, even from multiple sources, is woefully incomplete, the mind must join the evidence together in what seems the most sensible manner and then make "leaps of faith" in places where the evidence is incomplete or contradictory. The works that Spolsky explores in this book included many cases of the mental leap of faith or a deus ex machina ending where only divine intervention can resolve the problems of the plot. For instance, in the Early Modern artwork depicting Doubting Thomas, he is able to see the risen Jesus and even place his hand in Jesus’ wounds, and yet he must still rely on faith because both he and the viewers do not possess enough knowledge to understand the incarnation of Christ. Additionally the artwork of Susannah's false accusations and the trial in the concluding portion of Sir Philip Sidney's Arcadia both rely on the intervention of a godlike figure or prophet in order to resolve the narrative. With Sidney's story even going so far as to suggest that it is difficult or even impossible to arrive at a semblance of truth without faith. Spolsky concludes her novel by noting the way that skepticism comes from the evolutionary adaptation of the mind and that it could potentially be a defense mechanism that the mind offers for resisting ideological oppression.

== Word vs. Image: Cognitive Hunger in Shakespeare's England ==
In Word vs Image: Cognitive Hunger in Shakespeare's England, Ellen Spolsky expands on the themes of her earlier works: "the modular mind" in Gaps in Nature (1993), language in Satisfying Skepticism (2001), and vision in Iconotropism (2004). Words vs Image, then works to fill the gaps left by her earlier texts—namely that we don't learn in a singular way, and that, because of this, what we do learn is often conflicted as we try to make sense of all of the modes we receive information.

In Words vs Image, Spolsky relates Shakespeare to cognitive theory. Cognition, for the purpose of Spolsky's text is, means "knowing" or perhaps, "knowing together." This text is most interested in the distinction between knowing-through-seeing and knowing-through-words. There is a gap between knowing and seeing, and this gap creates discomfort. Theater itself was suspect, as it had visual representations of lies. Spolsky expands on how the neurological conflict between vision and language is played out soon the stage, as there is a dissonance between what you hear in the theater and what you see. What is heard is often more extravagant and more spectacular than what is seen.

For Spolsky, feeling is absolutely central. Feelings are the mind trying to know the cognitive process. Our need to know is as primal as our need to eat. Because of this, culture develops to adapt to a specific time or place, "A culture is built, on this view, as a group of people learns how to arrange life within their environment (which includes other people in the group and the material affordances the habitat supplies), learning not only what to hunt and what to gather, but how to feed on and metabolize knowledge itself as energy for further cultural elaboration and feeding is a good metaphor for this struggle, because it is both permanently dynamic and never permanently satisfying". For example, The Rape of Lucrece can be read as "toggling between abstraction and concretization" as art does, but the poem also plays to cognitive hungers specific to the time in which it was written. The poem went through eight editions by 1640, which suggests an appetite for the contents of the poem that was not satisfied.

The Protestant Reformation created a new distance between seeing and knowing, as the Protestant Church frowned upon the icons, statuary, and art popular with the Catholic Church. Spolsky sees a connection between the Protestant reformation and the abstraction of ideas, as may of the religious images are reduced or eliminated during the Reformation. This is a period also that explores and celebrates the cognitive work done by grotesque art, both visual and in plays such as Cymbeline. Spolsky expands the cognitive to cultural, and ultimately concludes that cognitive interpretation is the best means to understand the gaps in our knowing, as well as the cultural variables in human knowing.

"The grotesque," to Spolsky's view, "represents the co-existence of previously unmixable categories, without any claim that they can be merged. Both parts of the mix are still visible, neither occluded". Grotesque artistic works are there for abstract interpretation—like a cognitive puzzle. In chapter five, Spolsky writes about "category mismatches" and how art that is thusly mismatched is grotesque art because it blends animal, plant and human. Spolsky's examples of grotesque art are: Michelangelo's statue of the nude risen Christ (1514–20) in the church of Santa Maria sopra Minerva in Rome and by Shakespeare's Cymbeline (1609–10). All three works of art are uncategorizeable, and Spolsky expands on Cymbeline. Spolsky identifies three "representationally hungry issues of the early Jacobean years" that Cymbeline seems written to address: the first is how the divine can be conveyed without images, the second is how men want monogamy but also many heirs and how the two can be reconciled, and the third is how the culture of England relates to the culture of Italy. "Hungry" is an important word in Spolsky's text, as is the "gaps" that she seeks to fill in with words vs image.

== The Contracts of Fiction: Cognition, Culture, Community ==
Professor Spolsky has positioned herself on the frontier of a new kind of literary criticism; one that also questions what features are innate to our cognitive function. The heart of her most recent work is clear from the title, "Cognition, Culture, Community". She is mainly interested in how the brain functions in the context of literary criticism, that is to say what influences our perception and reality and how that informs the way that we process new ideas. In his review appearing in the "Renaissance Quarterly", Donald Beecher writes "This is an engaging, perceptive, and innovative book…for behind the entire study is a noble critical vision: to redeem the literary arts as expressions of our grounded evolutionary natures, and for this reason I fully endorse the pioneering spirit of this study. It is worth every minute of the time and attention it requires."

The book consists of nine chapters where Spolsky methodically addresses each of the three themes through stories and culture. She uses the term "cognitive hunger" as a description for the brain that is constantly hungering for more information. Beecher interprets this term as "hover[ing] between the literal and the metaphorical". This leads into her positioning of signs and signals as integral to the development of community and storytelling. The epistemology of storytelling is particularly important and examples range from simple gossiping to tragedies such as Hamlet. She is particularly interested in the link between popular theatrical grotesques and a call for change in the justice system in London at the time.

The current importance of Spolsky's work exists in her ability to draw information from biological, social, and literary history. She crafts a strong argument for the importance of art and literature as both reflective and integral pieces of culture without which we would exists in a world of immutability.
