= Madeleine Grumet =

American academic in curriculum theory and feminist theory (born 1940)

- Born: June 29, 1940 (age 86); Brooklyn, New York, U.S.
- Title: Dean of the School of Education at Brooklyn College (formerly)

Academic background
- Education: Barnard College (BA, 1961); University of Rochester (MA, PhD)

Academic work
- Discipline: Curriculum theory, feminist theory
- Institutions: Hobart and William Smith Colleges; Brooklyn College; University of North Carolina at Chapel Hill
- Notable works: Bitter Milk: Women and Teaching; Toward a Poor Curriculum (co-author)

Madeleine R. Grumet (born June 29, 1940) is an American academic in curriculum theory and feminist theory. Her 1988 work Bitter Milk: Women and Teaching explored women and teaching. She edits a book series on feminist theory and education for the State University of New York Press, and a series on the Politics of Identity and Education for Teachers College Press.

== Biography ==
=== Early life and education ===
Grumet attended Midwood High School and graduated in 1957. She attended Barnard College for her undergraduate studies and graduated in 1961 with a bachelor's degree in English Literature. She received a master's degree in English education and a doctorate in Curriculum Theory at the University of Rochester.

=== Career ===
Grumet began her career teaching high school English in the New York area for twelve years before returning to university studies for her graduate and postgraduate work. Since then, she has taught on the faculties of the University of Rochester and Hobart and William Smith Colleges, where she also served as Acting Dean of William Smith College. In 1988, she became Dean of the School of Education at Brooklyn College of the City University of New York. At Brooklyn College, Grumet directed the development of a new teacher education curriculum for early childhood and elementary education majors, developed the Center for Educational Change, and was a founder of Bridges to Brooklyn, a New Visions School. In 2009, Grumet was teaching in the Culture, Curriculum, and Change department at University of North Carolina at Chapel Hill's School of Education.

=== Marriage and children ===
As of 2005, her son, Jason Grumet, was the president of the Bipartisan Policy Center in Washington, D.C.

== Published works ==
- Toward a Poor Curriculum (coauthor with William Pinar; Kendall/Hunt Pub. Co., 1976)
- Bitter Milk: Women in Teaching (University of Massachusetts Press, 1988)

Quotes: "Our stories are the masks through which we can be seen, and with every telling we stop the flood and swirl of thought so someone can get a glimpse of us, and maybe catch us if they can" Madeleine R. Grumet O.I.S.E. Curriculum Theory 17:3 (1987)
