= J. S. Tissainayagam =

Sri Lankan journalist

- Born: April 30, 1962 (age 64); Sri Lanka
- Citizenship: Sri Lanka
- Education: Peradeniya University
- Occupation: Journalist
- Awards: Peter Mackler Award for Courageous and Ethical Journalism; Foreign Journalist of the Year, British Press Awards; Oxfam Novib/PEN Award

Jayaprakash Sittampalam Tissainayagam (Tamil: ஜெயப்பிரகாஷ் சிற்றம்பலம் திசைநாயகம்), known as J. S. Tissainayagam (ஜெ. சி. திசைநாயகம்), is a Sri Lankan Tamil journalist, best known for his 2008 indictment by the Sri Lankan government on politically motivated charges under the Prevention of Terrorism Act. On 31 August 2009, he was convicted of the charges by the Colombo High Court and sentenced to 20 years of rigorous imprisonment, and eventually pardoned after an international outcry.

== Career ==
J. S. Tissainayagam has been a journalist for over 20 years. He worked for The Sunday Leader and the Sunday Times, as well as many other newspapers before founding the North Eastern Herald. He was also a columnist for the Sunday Times.

== Arrest and trial of 2008 ==
Tissainayagam was detained on 7 March 2008 by the Terrorism Investigation Division (TID) of the Sri Lanka Police and held without charge for almost 6 months. Eventually, he was charged with intending to incite communal hatred through writing, and furthering terrorist acts through the collection of money for his magazine. Reporters Without Borders said that the magazine was actually funded by a German aid project. The magazine has since been closed down.

During his trial, Tissanayagam claimed that he was harassed and threatened by the TID while under detention. He has also filed a Fundamental rights petition with the Supreme Court of Sri Lanka. The TID produced a confession signed by Tissanayagam as evidence against him. Tissanayagam claimed it was dictated to him, and he was pressured to write it.

The only other pieces of evidence that the Government presented against Tissainayagam was two paragraphs he had written;

"1. In a July 2006 editorial, under the headline, "Providing security to Tamils now will define northeastern politics of the future," Tissainayagam wrote: "It is fairly obvious that the government is not going to offer them any protection. In fact it is the state security forces that are the main perpetrator of the killings."

2. A part of a November 2006 article on the military offensive in Vaharai, in the east, which said, "Such offensives against the civilians are accompanied by attempts to starve the population by refusing them food as well as medicines and fuel, with the hope of driving out the people of Vaharai and depopulating it. As this story is being written, Vaharai is being subject to intense shelling and aerial bombardment."

On 31 August 2009, the High Court of Sri Lanka sentenced Tissainayagam to a total of 20 years rigorous imprisonment, for arousing "communal feelings" by writing and publishing articles that criticised the government's treatment of Sri Lankan Tamil civilians affected by the war, and for raising money to fund the magazine in which the articles were published in furtherance of terrorism.

=== Reaction ===
In a statement to mark the World Press Freedom Day, U.S. President Barack Obama said Tissainayagam and other journalists like him were "guilty of nothing more than a passion for truth and a tenacious belief that a free society depends on an informed citizenry." President Obama said: "In every corner of the globe, there are journalists in jail or being actively harassed … Emblematic examples of this distressing reality are figures like J.S. Tissainayagam in Sri Lanka, or Shi Tao and Hu Jia in China."

Amnesty International criticised the action taken upon J.S. Tissainayagam and expressed deep concerns for the journalist, naming him a prisoner of conscience. Bob Dietz, CPJ Asia Program Coordinator says "We condemn J.S. Tissainayagam's long detention and harsh charges for publishing a magazine, which should not constitute an offence. This is the latest step by the Sri Lankan government to intimidate journalists who write about security issues."

During his detention without charge, among the people who expressed concern and opposition to this, were Sri Lankan religious leaders such as Colombo's Anglican Bishop Reverend Duleep De Chickera and the Sinhala Buddhist monk Ven Samitha Thera.

The Sri Lankan government defended his trial and conviction, with President Mahinda Rajapaksa saying the verdict was handed out by an independent judge and that the government can not interfere with the courts. He stated that "attempts now being made to pooh-pooh the charges in the indictment filed against Tissanayagam, rather than seen as any part of a vibrant campaign for media freedom, can be seen as an attempt at interfering with the judiciary and judicial process of (Sri Lanka)."

However international Governments and press freedom groups both in and out of Sri Lanka condemned the ruling. The Asian Human Rights Commission likened the trial to the "show trials" of the Stalinist era.

=== Pardon ===
On 3 May 2010, the Sri Lankan government announced that Tissainayagam would be pardoned by President Rajapaksa to mark the 2010 World Press Freedom Day.

== Awards ==
Tissainayagam has been named the first winner of the Peter Mackler Award for Courageous and Ethical Journalism. "We are happy to reward J.S. Tissainayagam in 2009, a terrible year for Sri Lanka," said Jean-Francois Julliard, secretary-general of the Paris-based press rights group Reporters Without Borders (RSF). "J.S. Tissainayagam is one of those and should never have been imprisoned," he said. "Sri Lankans have the right to be informed about what is happening on their island. They have the right to read words written by men like J. S. Tissainayagam."

Tissainayagam also won the Committee to Protect Journalists' International Press Freedom Award in 2009, but could not go to receive it due to his imprisonment.

In 2010, he was named Foreign Journalist of the Year at the British Press Awards. In 2011, he was honoured with an Oxfam Novib/PEN Award.

== See also ==
- Lasantha Wickrematunge
- Black July
- Sri Lankan Civil War
