= Currere =

Pedagogical approach

The "Method of Currere" is an approach to education based on post-modern philosophy and psychoanalytical technique, first described in a 1975 paper by William Pinar.

== The method ==
Currere encourages educators and learners to undertake an autobiographical examination of themselves.

Pinar suggests that the term currere, the infinitive form of curriculum, implies the framework for the autobiographical reflection on educational experiences that ultimately shape an individual's self-understanding in our democratic society. In relation to curriculum Pinar states, "The method of currere reconceptualized curriculum from course objectives to complicated conversation with oneself (as a 'private' intellectual), an ongoing project of self-understanding in which one becomes mobilized for engaged pedagogical action — as a private-and-public intellectual – with others in the social reconstruction of the public sphere".

== The framework ==
Pinar proposes a framework for the method of currere requiring those involved in education to reflect upon their life experiences thus far. The framework includes four steps or benchmarks to be followed. The steps are: the regressive, the progressive, the analytical, and the synthetic. Pinar uses the four steps as a framework to reflect on curriculum theory and public education. The framework's purpose is as follows, "This four step process includes retelling the story of one's educational experiences, imagining future possibilities for self-understanding and educational practice; analysis of the relationships between past, present and future life history and practice; and new ways of thinking about education".

Step one: The regressive step encourages learner/educators to remember particular educational experiences and how the past experiences have guided them in the development of their own personal attitude or beliefs about education. This allows them to understand how the past has not only affected them, but the people surrounding them. Pinar says one's past is "shared, each in his or her own way, by us all." They may remember past experiences and how they overcame struggles as a young person in society. John Dewey describes experience through trial and error. He states, "We simply do something, and when it fails, we do something else, and keep on trying till we hit upon something which works, and then we adopt that method as a rule of thumb measure in subsequent procedure".

Step two: The progressive step offers an opportunity to think about the future.

Step three: The analytical step involves analyzing the here and now and creates a subjective space of freedom from the present. Students and teachers may see the moments of right here and now as a "historical moment in which we lived, in which others have lived, and in which our descendants will someday live".

Step four: The final step is the synthetic step which involves analyzing the present in light of the knowledge and understanding gained from steps 1, 2, and 3. Many educators may use the first three steps to visualize and analyze their journey of becoming an educator. When they ultimately begin affecting others' lives and working with curriculum, educators find themselves in the synthetic stage of becoming. "One utilizes insights from past, present and future to create transformed educational environments".

== Impact ==
James G. Henderson and Rosie Gornik use currere in Transformative Curriculum Leadership as they present educators a particular type of curriculum judgment. They use a paradigm called curriculum wisdom problem solving while envisioning curriculum as a journey. Just as Pinar presents our process of becoming a journey, Henderson and Gornik use currere throughout their writing with the purpose of allowing the reader insights into firsthand accounts of educators' experiences. They work closely with teaching for 3S Understanding—"referring to the integration of Subject matter understanding with democratic Self and Social understanding and undertaking a personal journey of understanding". Within Transformative Curriculum Leadership we find Gornik's deep self-understanding in regard to 3S Understanding through her currere. She presents the reader with various autobiographical narratives and vignettes written to inspire the reader to delve into their own currere and examine their own self-understanding.

Henderson and Gornik (2007) say they incorporate the currere method in their book because they "acknowledge that educators who choose to facilitate their students' personalized journeys of understanding cannot do so without undertaking a similar journey of understanding". Educators have many responsibilities including presenting their students with opportunities or ideas of how to become active members in today's democratic society. The purpose of the book is to encourage the reader to become a "connoisseur" of democratic education with an understanding of educational growth in societies with democratic values.
