= Karl Katz =

Art historian, curator and museum director

- Born: 1929; New York City
- Died: 2017 (aged 87–88)
- Education: Columbia University
- Occupations: Art historian curator, and founder of many museums

Karl Katz (October 22, 1929 - November 8, 2017) (also Carl Katz) was an art historian, curator and museum director. Katz was director of the Bezalel National Museum - which later became The Israel Museum in Jerusalem. He also held positions at the Jewish Museum and the Metropolitan Museum of Art.

== Biography ==
Karl Katz was born in 1929. His parents were Maurice Katz and Rose (née Lefkowitz). He graduated from Midwood High School in Brooklyn and then began studying at Long Island University, but soon moved to Columbia University. There he completed a bachelor's degree in art history and Semitic studies and a master's degree in art history and archaeology. He finished his Doctoral dissertation on early Hebrew texts from Yemen, but he failed to do the doctorate because he did not fulfill the prerequisites for the required language skills. He refused to learn German so soon after the Holocaust. One of his mentors who greatly influenced the path he took was Meyer Schapiro.

Katz was married to Elizabeth Segal, whom he married in 1978. The couple had a son, Jonathan.

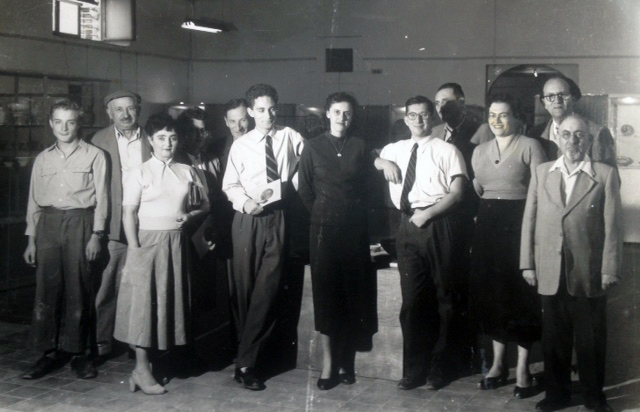

== Art career ==
Katz worked in 1953 as an art educator during the exhibition "From the Land of the Bible" at the Metropolitan Museum. He then joined the Bezalel National Museum as a curator, a forerunner of the Israel Museum. In 1969 he returned to New York and became director of the Jewish Museum. In 1971 he went to the Metropolitan Museum as head of the Department of Special Projects. In 1980 he became head of the department he created for film and television. He was also one of the planners of The Museum of the Jewish People at Beit Hatfutsot.

In 1992 he founded "Muse", a non-profit company for documentaries in the field of art.

In the early 1970s, Katz met the photographer Cornell Capa in an exhibition and persuaded him to put his International Center of Photography into a museum. It opened in 1974. For many years Katz was the deputy chairman of the museum curatorium.

== Publications (selection) ==
- Yehiel Shemi. Bezalel National Museum, Jerusalem 1957
- Modern Israel Painting. London 1958
- with Penuel Kahane, Magen Broshi: From the beginning: four millennia Holy Land in the most modern museum in the world. Hoffmann and Campe, Hamburg 1968
- The exhibitionist: living museum, loving museum. Overlook Press, New York 2016

== Filmography (selection) ==
- 1983: La Belle Epoque (1890-1914)
- 1984: In a Brilliant Light: Van Gogh in Arles
- 1989: Merchants and Masterpieces
- 1990: Frederick Law Olmsted and the Public Park of America
- 1992: Art on Film, Program 1: Balance
- 1992: Art on Film, Program 2: Sense
- 1992: Art on Film, Program 3: Form
- 1992: Art on Film, Program 4: Voice
- 1992: Art on Film, Program 5: Subject & Expert
- 1993: Degenerate Art
- 1997: Tashilham
- 1998: Chuck Close: A Portrait in Progress
- 2003: Hans Hofmann: Artist / Teacher, Teacher / Artist
- 2006: Who Gets to Call It Art?
- 2007: The Rich Their Own Photographers
- 2007: Robert Indiana: American Dreamer
- 2008: Herb & Dorothy
- 2012: Ai Weiwei: Never Sorry
