= 3S Understanding =

Curriculum structure created by James G. Henderson

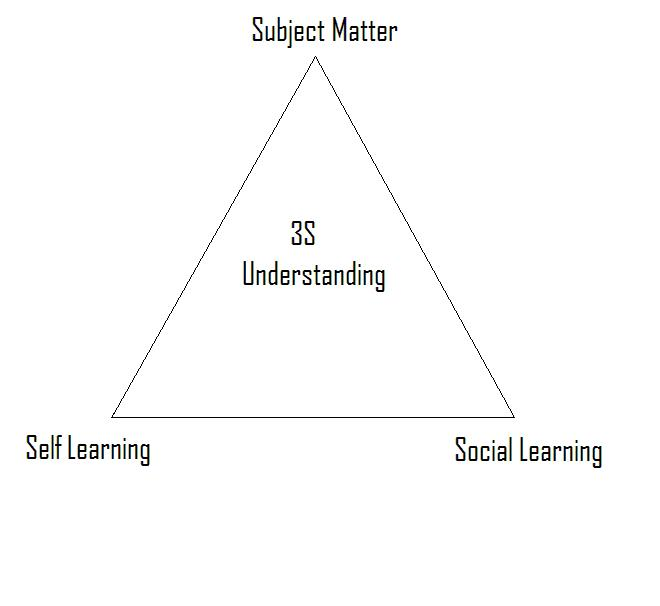
Henderson's 3S Understanding

3S Understanding is a curriculum structure that was created by James G. Henderson. 3S Understanding is a mixture of three components that can be diagrammed as a triangle. The three Ss are Subject Matter, Self-learning, and Social Learning.

Henderson and Gornik's Reflective Teaching: Professional Artistry Through Inquiry examines 3S understanding and teaching for democratic living. It goes in depth about subject learning, self-learning, and social learning. Henderson writes the book with the ideas and also presents several real life examples. It goes through teacher reflection and how teachers should be constantly refining their practice.

The manual on 3S Understanding and how to apply it to a curriculum is Transformative Curriculum Leadership by Henderson. It will be one of the most important documents in the study. Henderson outlines what 3S Understanding is, what it is based on, and how to implement it. The author discusses how to design and plan lessons, how to teach the lessons, evaluation of the lessons, and organization. Henderson even goes on to discuss how the community and school can get involved and help expand and support this form of curriculum.

== Understanding by Design ==
Understanding by Design by Wiggins and McTighe takes on the heavy task of getting students to not merely gain factual knowledge but to understand what they are learning. The authors talk about using backward design to focus on the goals and then determine what the students need to do to show they have achieved the goals. Wiggins and McTighe describe the goal of backward design as, "lessons, unite, and courses should be logically inferred from the results sought, not derived from the methods, books, and activities with which we are most comfortable". They also delve into the idea of being able to use information and apply it to different situations. Helping the students to understand how they are learning and their metacognitive ability is integral in 3S understanding. The self aspect of 3S understanding desires for the student to see themselves as a lifelong learner. Wiggins and McTighe cover the subject matter and social aspects of 3S understanding.

== 21st Century Skills ==
The 21st Century Skills and 21st Century Themes are becoming more prevalent in education as time goes on. The connection 21st Century skills have with 3S understanding is that sense of being a self-learner. Students need to see themselves as constantly learning through life as they develop skills in a fast changing world. The authors report: Achieving education's goals in our time is shaped by the increasingly powerful technologies we have for communicating, collaborating, and learning. And learning assumes a central role throughout life.

== Subject matter ==
The subject is the base curriculum and standards that are used by the school, state, and nation. They are inherent in every curriculum but James Henderson goes further in describing what he sees as subject. He says, “Teaching for democratic living requires the use of thinking-centered, performance-based activities". Teaching subject matter is important but it needs to focus on student thinking and assessment. Henderson gives many forms of performance-based learning: Collaborative learning, peer teaching, project-based learning, understanding performances, infusion of critical and creative thinking, and authentic problems that have real-world significance. Henderson also discusses the importance of constructivist learning and how drawing from past experiences and applying it to the present is important. The students will gain more meaning from the material if it has some meaning to them.

== Self-learning ==
The second S is for Self-Learning and it represents the students’ view of themselves as lifelong learners. It is important for students to see themselves as constantly learning from others and from themselves. Everything that a student experiences, every person that they talk to, and everything they do impacts their beliefs and knowledge. If a teacher can help a student to realize that then they can help the student to grow to be active participants in a democratic society. Henderson also talks about social-emotional growth and how it can be accomplished by fostering, “caring and supportive learning environments that invite active student participation in classroom and school management activities”. It is important for students to make good choices and to know how to express emotion.

== Social learning ==
The third S stands for Social Learning which gives the student understanding of their society. It helps them think about “equity, diversity, and civility issues”. Equity has to do with the equality of people and the ideas of fair and just. Henderson suggests that stereotypes are squashed at an early age and that grading should encourage all students. Diversity should celebrate human differences and diversity should be seen as something good. Civility focuses on the right to have different opinions and to listen to everyone's opinion even if it is different.

== Paradigms ==
3S Understanding is built upon the curriculum wisdom paradigm which is an expansion of the constructivist best practice paradigm. The paradigm that Henderson is looking to get away from is the standardized management paradigm. He compares the two by saying standardized management's problem solving cycle is, “goal-setting, decision-making, and reflecting activities aligned to high-stakes standardized tests” while curriculum wisdom's is “goal-setting, decision-making, and reflecting activities that facilitate student’s subject matter meaning making in a context of active democratic living”. The difference is the last part of each explanation. One focuses on the high-stakes standardized tests while the other focuses on taking what the student is learning and applying it to themselves and the society they live in.

Henderson and Kessen's Curriculum Wisdom book is about one of the three educational paradigms that Henderson says are inherent in one another; they are the standardized management paradigm, the constructivist best practice paradigm, and the curriculum wisdom paradigm. Curriculum wisdom has to do with expanding upon the subject matter the student is learning. The curriculum wisdom paradigm is a “concise way to convey the subtle and complex challenges of approaching curriculum work as envisioning and enacting a good educational journey”. It is putting the subject matter in context with how it is meaningful to their lives. In essence the argument is that people need to know the subject matter, how to use it in their lives, and how to be a good member of society.

== Transformative standards ==
The paradigms are revisited when Henderson talks about standards. Standards are an important topic in education and seeing the Transformative Standards he puts forth shows them in a new light. Received standards stress the importance of “standardized factual knowledge and skills, knowledge and skills that are testable with a large population, and criteria based on a predetermined metric based on counting”. These standards are not based on the students or what they have learned. Henderson's Transformative Standards are based on student understanding and wisdom. Taking what the student knows of the subject and allowing them to show their understanding through demonstration and performances.

== Six facets of understanding ==
Important in creating a curriculum with 3S understanding is to include Henderson's Six Facets of Understanding. Wisdom is having knowledge and knowing how to apply it. Henderson gives ways to assess if a student understands and shows wisdom on a topic. He says a student who really understands, “can explain, can interpret, can apply, sees in perspective, demonstrates empathy, and reveals self-knowledge”. Many of these ways to see if a student understands are not normally used in the classroom. The reason is because 3S understanding requires more of the student while at the same time gives them more. It may seem like more work for the student but actually the student is connecting the work to themselves and their surroundings. It will stimulate students more and seeing themselves as lifelong learners will motivate them to acquire knowledge and wisdom.

== Example: Integrated Curriculum ==
Integrated curricula like teaching for 3S understanding are becoming more popular all around the world. The article "Japan's National Curriculum Reforms: Focus on Integrated Curriculum" was an excellent source of information on curriculum infusion. It was geared toward helping to implement the integration into school systems. Japan wanted their children to grow up to be well-balanced adults. This article provided excellent insight into why the basic standards are not enough anymore. Arani says: On this basis, the optional courses increase; the teacher's role changes; and the school should teach the students how to think, decide, and organize their thoughts, as well as how to gain the skills for learning, research, and collection and analysis of data. The school should also teach the students how to learn while being in contact with their surroundings, and how to relate all the learning with the society, and the daily life. Children need to learn to think more independently. They need to be able to understand what is happening around them in their environment. The rich culture all around them needs to be coupled with the problems and issues around them as well. Japan has realized and acted on the realization that basic knowledge base curriculum does not work anymore. The world is a changing place and teachers need to integrate the world into their students’ educations. It relates to the self and social learning aspects of 3S understanding that help set it apart. This is an excellent example of the democratic self and social understanding discussed by Henderson.

== Example: The Curriculum Infusion of Real Life Issues ==
The Curriculum Infusion of Real Life Issues Model is about taking issues that students face in their everyday lives and addressing them. There are many issues that students can face as they grow into adults. Ignoring them in the classroom is not the right way to go about producing responsible adults. The authors include issues such as bullying, drugs and alcohol, smoking, violence, and sexually transmitted diseases. It would be productive if teachers can acknowledge and support students when they face problems like these. Students and teachers can develop more of an interpersonal bond and even help their communities grow. The authors describe the curriculum infusion, “It makes classes more relevant to students by addressing their real world concerns and connects teachers more closely to the students and communities where they work." Included in the authors' research are topics such as diversity, environment, and prevention. This is another example of self and social understanding being used in conjunction with subject matter. It shows that there is more to students’ lives than simply subject matter.

== Example: "More Like Real Life" ==
The article “More Like Real Life: Motivational Methods of Teaching in Upper Secondary School” is helpful in understanding how teachers and students interact. It is a Swedish article but is important to understand the relationship between teacher and student for real life inclusion methods. The authors write, “Both the school and the working force of teachers need a new conception of what knowledge is Carlgren would like to see a new knowledge movement based on a way of viewing knowledge that ‘instead of knowledge being seen as a substance, is seen as a relationship between humanity and the world.’” This shows how important it is for students to see that they are a part of the world. They need to take what they know and connect it to their surroundings. People are a part of something bigger than themselves and need to understand the relationship they have with the world. The article also discusses a study done at a high school where everyone was from a different place. The high school recruited students from everywhere. It was the perfect place to have a study on school and its effect on a student's culture. The study found that students created a culture and working community of their own. They were able to understand each other and work together in their school activities. After school activities played an important role in the study. It gave the student more of a bond between each other and allowed the teachers to get involved in their lives. It was perfect to help understand how integrating real life issues could help students, parents, the community, and teachers in a school system. This article explores how schools have an effect on students and how students and teachers have an effect on each other. Social studies is very involved with social and self-understanding and the 3S Curriculum model would fit easily and with great results.

== See also ==
- Currere
