= W. W. Charters =

Werrett Wallace Charters (1875–1952) was an American educator and educational theorist who was among the leading proponents of the social efficiency movement in curriculum development during the early twentieth century. He is best known for applying the principles of scientific management and activity analysis to curriculum construction, advocating that educational objectives should be derived from the activities and tasks individuals perform in society.

== Early life and education ==
Charters was born in 1875 in the United States. He pursued higher education at several American institutions and began his career as a teacher before entering academia. He later became a professor of education at the University of Chicago, where he contributed to research and teaching in curriculum studies, educational administration, and teacher education.

== Contributions to curriculum theory ==
Charters was one of the principal advocates of the functional approach to curriculum development. Influenced by the principles of scientific management associated with Frederick Winslow Taylor, he argued that curriculum planning should begin with a systematic analysis of the activities individuals are expected to perform in society. These activities should then be broken down into specific tasks from which educational objectives, knowledge, skills, and attitudes could be derived.

His approach emphasized the relationship between schooling and the practical demands of social and occupational life. Rather than organizing the curriculum solely around academic subjects, Charters proposed that educational experiences should prepare learners to perform socially significant activities efficiently and effectively.

== Major works ==
Charters' best-known publication is: Curriculum Construction (1923), in which he presented a systematic methodology for designing curricula based on activity analysis and clearly defined educational objectives.

Throughout his career, he also published works on teacher education, educational supervision, educational measurement, and curriculum improvement.

== Legacy ==
Charters played a significant role in shaping early twentieth-century curriculum theory. His work helped shift curriculum development from a subject-centered model toward one that emphasized social functions, behavioral objectives, and preparation for effective participation in modern society. He is widely recognized as one of the leading figures of the social efficiency movement, alongside educators such as John Franklin Bobbitt, whose ideas influenced curriculum planning and educational reform throughout the twentieth century.
