= Official Knowledge =

1993 book by Michael Apple

- Author: Michael Apple
- Subject: Education
- Published: 1993 (Routledge)
- Pages: 226
- ISBN: 0-415-90749-7

Official Knowledge: Democratic Education in a Conservative Age is a book written in 1993 by Michael Apple about the inherent politics of educational practice and policy. Its themes include right-wing cultural hegemony, control of textbook contents, and the role of private business in schools. It has received three editions.
