= Learning log =

Personalized pupil record

Two students share and compare their learning logs.

Learning Logs are a personalized learning resource for children. In the learning logs, the children record their responses to learning challenges set by their teachers. Each log is a unique record of the child's thinking and learning. The logs are usually a visually oriented development of earlier established models of learning journals, which can become an integral part of the teaching and learning program and have had a major impact on their drive to develop a more independent learner.

== Model Support ==
The importance of learners becoming aware of their own thought processes and gaining insights into the strategies they use to resolve problems, or overcome difficulties. There is also critical need for students to become actively involved in the process of learning.

Research findings indicating that journals of this type are likely to increase metacognition through students becoming more aware of their own thought processes. Research using a "thinking book" which investigated the development of reflective thinking skills in children.

This model of learning logs differs significantly from these earlier models by introducing a greater opportunity for the children to introduce colourful graphic and physical representations to illustrate their thinking and learning, rather than simply relying on the written word. Much of the development of learning logs built on practical classroom applications of mapping and visual tools. This has generated a motivation to engage in the process of reflective learning in students who have had more difficulty in expressing themselves through the conventional written form. The use of the learning logs has extended now to schools in Australia, Canada and Thailand in addition to their extensive use in schools throughout the UK. An outline of some of the practical applications of the learning logs along with a number of illustrations of the innovative thinking which has emerged as a product of this visual learning tool.

== Use and Scope ==
Closeup of a child's Learning log

The process of using learning logs involves developing thinking and learning skills, which are enhanced by a peer partnership system. In this peer system, the children are encouraged to discuss and share their thoughts, as well as to develop their learning logs in a collaborative way. Learning Logs also give the opportunity for the students to provide feedback to their teachers in order to help extend and elaborate their understanding.

A child's learning log

The learning log allows teachers to quickly and easily share weekly teaching objectives with the children. Once set up the children then take the lead role in sharing and developing their knowledge and understanding and displaying this in a range of styles. The learning log is not an in depth assessment tool but more of a snapshot of what the students have or have not understood in their lesson material.

The learning log can be used at any key stage and for a range of learning activities. It addresses the current creative agenda and has had considerable success with students of a more challenging nature.

== See also ==
- Educational psychology
- Pedagogy
