= Journal of Curriculum and Instruction =

The Journal of Curriculum and Instruction (ISSN 1937-3929) is a biannual peer-reviewed open-access academic journal. It publishes articles about research, practice, and issues relevant to teaching and learning in the pre-kindergarten to grade 12 environment. The journal is published by the College of Education, East Carolina University. The founding editors of the journal include Katherine O'Connor, Terry Atkinson, Sue Steinweg, Elizabeth Swaggerty, William Grobe, and Guili Zhang. The editor-in-chief is Diane Kester. It has received the 2010 Edward C. Pomeroy Award from the American Association of Colleges for Teacher Education for "outstanding contributions to teacher education".
