= Spiral approach =

Teaching technique

See also spiral model, a software development approach.

Four spirals in a medical studies curriculum

The spiral approach is a technique often used in education where the initial focus of instruction is the basic facts of a subject, with further details being introduced as learning progresses. Throughout instruction, both the initial basic facts and the relationships to later details are repeatedly emphasized to help enter into long-term memory.

Educational researchers R. M. Harden and N. Stamper describe a spiral curriculum as one in which topics, subjects or themes are revisited throughout a course, with later encounters linked to earlier learning and increasing the learner's competence.

Jerome Bruner proposed the spiral curriculum as a teaching approach in which each subject or skill area is revisited at intervals, at a more sophisticated level each time. First, there is basic knowledge of a subject, then more sophistication is added, reinforcing principles that were first discussed. This system is used in China and India. Bruner's spiral curriculum, however, draws heavily from evolution to explain how to learn better, and thus it drew criticism from conservatives. In the United States classes are split by grade — life sciences in 9th grade, chemistry in 10th, physics in 11th. The spiral teaches life sciences, chemistry, physics all in one year, then two subjects, then one, then all three again to understand how they mold together. Bruner also believes learning should be spurred by interest in the material rather than tests or punishment, since one learns best when one finds the acquired knowledge appealing.
