= Curriculum studies =

Curriculum studies or curriculum sciences is a concentration in the different types of curriculum and instruction concerned with understanding curricula as an active force influenced by human educational experiences. Its proponents investigate the relationship between curriculum theory and educational practice in addition to the relationship between school programs, the contours of the society, and the culture in which schools are located.

There are key questions related to curriculum studies:

- What should be taught in schools?
- Why should it be taught? To whom should it be taught?
- What does it mean to be an educated person?

== History ==
Curriculum studies was created in 1930 and known as the first subdivision of the American Educational Research Association. It was originally created to be able to manage "the transition of the American secondary school from an elite preparatory school to a mass terminal secondary school" until the 1950s when "a preparation for college" became a larger concern. In 1970 the focus of curriculum studies shifted again due to the belief of young activist. These individuals wanted to begin incorporating social and cultural aspects. This shift from developing and evaluating curriculum to understanding curriculum became known as the "Reconceptualization" of the curriculum field.

== The different types of curriculum ==
=== Hidden curriculum ===
A type of curriculum that focuses on how society transmits culture from generation to generation has been tagged with the term "hidden curriculum" For instance, one of the 19th century founders of the discipline of sociology, Émile Durkheim, observed that more is taught and learned in schools than specified in the established curriculum of textbooks and teacher manuals. This curriculum has "non-academic functions and effects" In Moral Education Durkheim wrote:

In fact, there is a whole system of rules in the school that predetermine the child's conduct. He must come to class regularly; he must arrive at a specified time and with an appropriate bearing and attitude. He must not disrupt things in class. He must have learned his lessons, done his homework, and have done so reasonably well, etc. There are, therefore, a host of obligations that the child is required to shoulder. Together they constitute the discipline of the school. It is through the practice of school discipline that we can inculcate the spirit of discipline in the child. (1961 [1925]). Moral Education. New York, The Free Press. p . 148)

It teaches children life skills like learning to "wait quietly", exercising restraint, putting forth your best effort, completing work, keeping busy, cooperating, "showing allegiance to both teachers and peers", being neat and punctual, so on and so forth.

=== Common core ===
Common core is a type of curriculum that heavily focuses on building "literacy skills and understandings required for college and career readiness in multiple disciplines" is the curriculum aligned to common core. The main goal of Common core is to encourage critical thinking by utilizing the questioning strategy. Students gain a more advanced understanding of a topic as they have to elaborate on their thoughts. Memorization is no longer key. This type of curriculum requires instructors to ask the right kind of questions, depending on one's content area, for it to be effective.

To achieve Common core's primary goal of critical thinking, educators often utilize active learning methodologies. Active learning puts students into the role of active participate through collaborative problem-solving and hands-on learning. Research published by the Proceedings of the National Academy of Sciences (PNAS) found that these methods can reduce the achievement gap in STEM scores by 33% and narrow passing rate gaps by 45%. PNAS also found active learning makes complex technical content more accessible to underrepresented groups.

Types of ELA and Social Studies question include:

- Literal question- a question that children can easily find the answer to
- Interpretative question- a question that requires children to dig deeper. Students are tasked with interpreting the text's meaning or content.
- Evaluative question- a question that requires students to reflect on the text in an analytical manner.

Types of Science questions include:

- Convergent question- a question that causes students to utilize basic knowledge. This the type of question lies within a three-tier question system. It should be used first.
- Divergent question- a question that can invoke a variety of responses. This is the type of question lies within a three-tier question system. It should be used second.
- Evaluative thinking- a question that can be used to gather ones opinion about the text. This is the type of question lies within a three-tier question system. It should be used third.

Types of Math questions include:

- Procedural- questions that require simple problem solving.
- Conceptual- questions that require abstract cognition and thinking regarding math concepts.
- Application- questions that require the use of math skills on real world problems.

=== Emergent curriculum ===
A type of curriculum that focuses on the implantation of children's interests is called emergent curriculum. Emergent curriculum has one main goal. That goal is to "create meaningful [learning opportunities] for children" based on those interests. This type of curriculum requires the instructor to consistently implicate certain task and skills for it to be used correctly. These tasks and skills are observations, documentation, creative brainstorming, flexibility, and patience.

- Observations- How does the student react? What was the outcome of using that particular strategy?
- Documentation- What do you see?
- Creative brainstorming- How can your students explore their topic of interest further? What are some potential activities?
- Flexibility and Patience- These aspects are needed because the curriculum is constantly undergoing change, growth, and development.

Similar to above, this curriculum also has non- academic benefits. Emergent curriculum is "meant to be culturally responsive and inclusive in nature, so that all children [can] work at their own pace". A teacher's role is to "[following] the children's lead, [expanding] on their interests, [providing] meaningful and developmentally appropriate materials, and [promoting] independent learning skills". Children's interests guides the curriculum.

A common application of emergent curriculum is Project-Based Learning (PBL). When paired with active learning, PBL integrates multiple subjects to solve real-world issues. This approach emphasizes co-creation where curriculum is developed with students rather than taught to them as passive participants. Studies have shown that this flexibility helps narrow achievement gaps for underrepresented groups.

=== Culturally Responsive Pedagogy (CRP) ===
Culturally Responsive Pedagogy is a student-centered approach that empowers students through their cultural knowledge, prior experiences, and frames of references to make education more engaging. Developed from the work of Gloria Ladson-Billings, CRP moves away from the traditional "deficit model" of education toward an "asset-based model" where the student's background (language, home life, culture) is a strength. The reason why CRP is effective is because it fosters a more relatable and engaging environment. This has been found to broaden participation and improves student retention in tech-heavy fields. Other benefits include enhancing academic achievement and student engagement, a stronger sense of belonging and emotional well-being, and higher critical thinking skills.

The three core principles of CRP are academic achievement, cultural competence, and sociopolitical consciousness. Through these core principles, CRP makes the classroom an environment where students can see their own communities reflected in the problems they solve. For example, a student could use statistical analysis to question social justice issues in their own neighborhood.

For CRP to work, the role of the school and teacher is equally important. A study found three factors that schools and teachers can do before the classroom to make CRP successful.

1. Create school policies that encourage teachers to make their own decisions in professional development. When teachers felt they had agency in their learning, they were more committed to the practice.
2. The school must also have supportive culture where they are equally involved. Miscommunication or lack of administrative awareness can become obstacles despite teacher intent.
3. Teachers must examine their own implicit biases. This self-reflection is important so there isn't a disconnect between teacher and student identities.

Oakland International High School is an example of CRP by utilizing an asset-based model that treats the diverse student body of over 35+ native languages and diverse cultural backgrounds as foundational tools of learning. The school uses "community walks," where teachers visit students homes and gives the student and their family the ability to act as the expert and educator. They also utilize a project-based curriculum that allows students to compare their home countries and the U.S. to navigate a new environment. Oakland International High School also saw academic benefits that outperformed district and state averages (72% graduation rate and 49% in college readiness for English learners).

In terms of higher education, the two primary bottlenecks preventing the growth of CRP in higher education is faculty resistance and institutional lack of support.

== Assessments ==
These are the two main types of assessments used to measure mastery of standards and expectations within a chosen curriculum.

=== Formative ===
A type of low stakes assessment that indirectly measures a student's understanding of the topic. These types of assessments are typically placed throughout a unit and presented in the form of an activity. Instructors use the results "as feedback to modify [future] teaching and [or] learning activities". Examples of this type of assessment include:

- Exit slips or any type of reflection work
- Homework
- In class discussions or any question-answer sessions
- Any observations regarding student's body language

=== Summative ===
A type of high stakes assessment that directly measures students understanding of a topic. They are typically placed at the end of the unit and presented in formal or cumulative format. Instructors use it to assess "what a student has learned, or the quality of the learning, and judge performance against some standards". Examples of this type of assessment include:

- Projects
- Unit Test
- Formal writing prompt with a rubric
- Porfolios

== See also ==
- Bias in curricula

== External links to university programs ==
- Arizona State University in Tempe, Arizona, USA.
- Ontario Institute for Studies in Education, University of Toronto http://www.oise.utoronto.ca/ctl/Prospective_Students/CTL_Graduate_Programs/Curriculum_Studies_and_Teacher_Development_%28CSTD%29/index.html
- University of British Columbia in Vancouver: www.ubc.ca
- University of Illinois at Chicago: http://www.uic.edu/gcat/EDCIE.shtml#e
- University of Wisconsin-Madison: https://ci.education.wisc.edu/research/curriculum-studies-global-studies/
- Monmouth University, West Long Branch, New Jersey: www.monmouth.edu
- Arcadia University, Philadelphia, PA, USA
- Georgia Southern University, Statesboro, GA, USA
- University of Alberta in Edmonton: https://web.archive.org/web/20070116062802/http://www.uofaweb.ualberta.ca/secondaryed/
- North West University, North West, South Africa
- Indiana University, Bloomington, IN: www.iub.edu
- Purdue University: http://www.edci.purdue.edu/curriculum_studies/
- Texas Tech University (Lubbock, TX): https://www.depts.ttu.edu/education/graduate/curriculum-and-instruction/curriculum_studies_teacher_education.php
- Texas Christian University: https://web.archive.org/web/20140225210058/http://www.coe.tcu.edu/graduate-students-curriculum-studies.asp
- Brock University, St.Catharines, Ontario, Canada: http://www.brocku.ca/education/futurestudents/graduateed/mastersofed/program-description Curriculum Studies is now known as Social and Cultural Contexts of Education (*due to the change of the MEd program requirements commencing in 2008-09 http://www.brocku.ca/webcal/2007/graduate/educ.html)
- Oklahoma State University, Stillwater, OK: http://education.okstate.edu/cied
- Western University, London, ON : https://web.archive.org/web/20160308202142/http://www.edu.uwo.ca/graduate-education/Program%20Brochures/PhD%20-%20Field%20of%20Curriculum%20Studies.pdf
- DePaul University, Chicago, Illinois : https://education.depaul.edu/academics/leadership-language-curriculum/graduate/curriculum-studies-phd/Pages/default.aspx
- University of North Texas, Denton, Texas: https://www.unt.edu/academics/grad/curriculum-and-instruction-phd
