= David Snedden =

American education theorist (1868–1951)

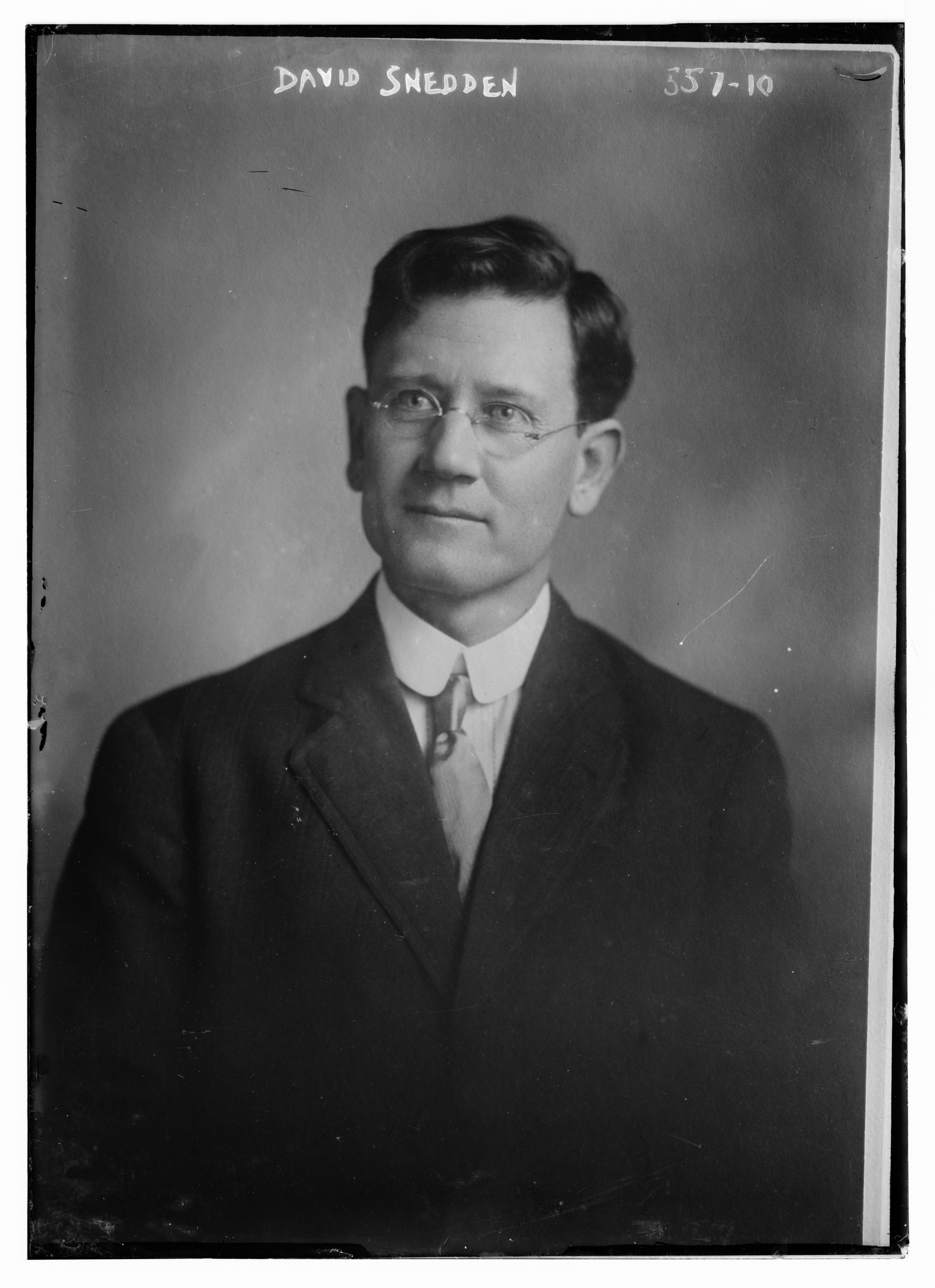
David Snedden

David Samuel Snedden (1868–1951) was an American educator. The first Commissioner of education in Massachusetts, he left the position to serve on the faculty of Teachers College, Columbia University (1916–1935). Snedden was a pioneer in the field of educational sociology and the social efficiency movement, which promoted vocational education.

Snedden was born on a farm in Kavilah, California before attending St. Vincent's College in Los Angeles.
