= Ralph W. Tyler =

American educator (1902–1994)

Ralph Winfred Tyler
- Born: April 22, 1902
- Died: February 18, 1994 (aged 91)
- Occupation: educator
- Known for: the father of educational evaluation and assessment

Ralph Winfred Tyler (April 22, 1902 – February 18, 1994) was an American educator and educationalist who worked in the field of assessment and evaluation. He served on or advised a number of bodies that set guidelines for the expenditure of federal funds and influenced the underlying policy of the Elementary and Secondary Education Act of 1965. Tyler chaired the committee that developed the National Assessment of Educational Progress (NAEP). He has been called by some as "the father of educational evaluation and assessment".

== Early life and education ==
Tyler was born on April 22, 1902, in Chicago to a professional family. His maternal grandfather was in the Civil War and had been appointed as a judge in Washington by president Ulysses S. Grant. His father, William Augustus Tyler, had been raised in a farm, and had become a doctor. Deeply religious, there came a time when both of Tyler's parents thought that the medical profession was too lucrative and that they should realign their priorities, at which point his father became a Congregational minister. As the sixth of eight children, Tyler grew up in Nebraska where he recalled having to trap animals for food and wear donated clothing. He worked at various jobs while growing up, including his first job at age twelve in a creamery.

Tyler went to college during the day and worked as a telegraph operator for the railroad at night. He received his bachelor's degree in 1921 at the age of 19 from Doane College in Crete, Nebraska. There was a time when Tyler wanted to become a missionary in Rhodesia, but he declined because he had no formal instruction in ministry, unlike his younger brother who had gone to Yale Divinity School. However, later all the brothers pursued a career in the field of education.

His first teaching job was as a high school science teacher in Pierre, South Dakota. In 1923, Tyler wrote a science test for high school students which helped him "see the holes in testing only for memorization." He earned his master's degree from the University of Nebraska in 1923 and his Ph.D. from the University of Chicago in 1927.

His graduate work at the University of Chicago connected him with notable educators Charles Judd and W. W. Charters, whose ideas influenced Tyler’s later work in curriculum development and evaluation. Tyler’s first appointment was at the University of North Carolina in 1927, where he worked with state teachers to improve curricula. Later in 1927, Tyler joined the faculty at Ohio State University, where he refined his innovative approach to testing while working with Charters, who was the director of the university's Bureau of Educational Research. Tyler helped Ohio State University faculty to improve their teaching and increase student retention. He is credited with coining the term "evaluation" for aligning measurement and testing with educational objectives. Because his concept of evaluation consisted of gathering comprehensive evidence of learning rather than just paper and pencil tests, Tyler might even be viewed as an early proponent of portfolio assessment.

== Eight-Year Study ==
Tyler headed the evaluation staff of the "Eight-Year Study" (1933–1941), a national program, involving 30 secondary schools and 300 colleges and universities, that addressed narrowness and rigidity in high school curricula. He first gained prominence in 1938 when he was lured by Robert Maynard Hutchins from Ohio State University to the University of Chicago to continue his work there. In 1953, Tyler became the first director of the Center for Advanced Study in the Behavioral Sciences at Stanford University, a position he held until his retirement in 1967.

== Thoughts on curriculum ==
A decade after completing his work with the Eight-Year Study, Tyler formalized his thoughts on viewing, analyzing and interpreting the curriculum and instructional program of an educational institution in Basic Principles of Curriculum and Instruction (1949). This book was a bestseller and has since been reprinted in 36 editions, shaping curriculum and instructional design to this day. The book laid out a deceptively simple structure for delivering and evaluating instruction consisting of four parts that became known as the Tyler Rationale:

1. What educational purposes should the school seek to attain? (Defining appropriate learning objectives.)
2. How can learning experiences be selected which are likely to be useful in attaining these objectives? (Introducing useful learning experiences.)
3. How can learning experiences be organized for effective instruction? (Organizing experiences to maximize their effect.)
4. How can the effectiveness of learning experiences be evaluated? (Evaluating the process and revising the areas that were not effective.)

In this book, Tyler describes learning as taking place through the action of the student. "It is what he does that he learns, not what the teacher does" (Tyler p. 63).

== Educational advisor ==
Tyler advised President Truman on reforming the curriculum at the service academies in 1952 and, under Eisenhower, chaired the President’s Conference on Children and Youth. The Johnson Administration used Tyler’s advice to shape many of its education bills and programs.

Tyler was named founding director of the Center for Advanced Study in the Behavioral Sciences in 1954 and held that position through 1967. The center was originally envisioned as a five-year project, but later became an ongoing independent institution that would eventually claim to have supported over 2,000 leading scientists and scholars. As a member of the governing board, Tyler is credited with playing a critical role in determining the character of the center as a new type of educational institution.

In 1964, the Carnegie Corporation asked Tyler to chair the committee that would eventually develop the National Assessment of Educational Progress (NAEP) in 1969. Before this time, Tyler wrote, "no comprehensive and dependable data about the educational attainments of our [young] people" were available.

Ralph Tyler also contributed to educational agencies such as the National Science Board, the Research and Development Panel of the U.S. Office of Education, the National Advisory Council on Disadvantaged Children, the Social Science Research Foundation, the Armed Forces Institute, and the American Association for the Advancement of Science. Ralph Tyler also served the Association for Supervision and Curriculum Development (ASCD) and helped publish its Fundamental Curriculum Decisions in 1983.

== Late life and legacy ==
Tyler formally retired in 1967 from the Center for Advanced Study, but he later became president of the System Development Foundation in San Francisco in 1969, which supported basic research in information sciences. He was also on many other commissions, committees, and foundations. He was on the National Advisory Council on Education for Disadvantaged Children, a panel to study SAT scores, and was also the chairman on the Exploratory Committee on Assessing Progress on Education.

After his retirement, Tyler maintained an active life as a lecturer and consultant. He was a visiting professor at the University of Massachusetts-Amherst and he advised on evaluation and curriculum in Ghana, Indonesia, Ireland, Israel and Sweden. Tyler was reported to have remained strongly optimistic about the future of education, right up until the end of his life.

Tyler believed in the social role of religion and remained a member of the First Congregational Church of Palo Alto, to which he paid contributions. However, he refused to adhere to fundamentalism.

Tyler died of cancer at the age of 91 on February 18, 1994, at the St. Paul's Health Care Center in San Diego, California.

== Sources ==
- Families.com. Tyler, Ralph (1902–1994). Retrieved 02/03/06 from http://education.families.com/tyler-ralph-w-1902-x20131994-2587-2590-eoed
- Finder, Morris; Gates, Jr., Henry Louis (2004-08-30). Educating America: How Ralph W. Tyler Taught America to Teach. Westport: Praeger. ISBN 978-0275981976. S2CID 160402374.
- Natera-Riles, M. "Ralph W. Tyler". Archived from the original on 2009-03-21.
- Nowakowski, Jeri Ridings (November 1981). "An Interview with Ralph Tyler" (Interview). Archived from the original on 2007-07-11.
- Tyler, Ralph W. (1949). Basic principles of curriculum and instruction. Chicago: University of Chicago Press. doi:10.7208/chicago/9780226820323.001.0001. ISBN 978-0226086507. S2CID 60712998.
