= John Franklin Bobbitt =

Educationist

- Born: February 16, 1876; English, Indiana, U.S.
- Died: March 7, 1956 (aged 80); Shelbyville, Indiana, U.S.
- Education: Indiana University, Clark University
- Occupations: educationist, university professor, writer
- Known for: Curriculum development, Educational theory
- Movement: Efficiency Movement

John Franklin Bobbitt (February 16, 1876 near English, Indiana – March 7, 1956 in Shelbyville, Indiana) was an American educationist, a university professor and a writer. A representative of the efficiency minded thinkers and proponent of eugenics, he specialized in the field of the curriculum.

== Early life and education ==
His parents were James and Martha Bobbitt, he was born in the small town of English, Indiana on February 16, 1876. Bobbitt graduated in 1901 from the Indiana University. He first worked in several rural schools in Indiana.

From 1903 to 1907, Bobbitt was a teacher at the Philippine Normal School in Manila. He went to the Philippines as part of a member of a committee sent to draw up an elementary school curriculum for the islands. They had the freedom to form an original curriculum to fit the needs of the population. At first they put together American textbooks which they had been familiar with in United States schools, but a director of education in the Philippines made them look this over. When they saw that their idea did not fit with the social realities, they discarded their original plan. This time they drew up a plan with a variety of things to help the people gain health, make a living, and enjoy self-realization. They got away from the American textbooks and found activities derived from the Philippine culture. This is when Bobbitt realized that there were more useful solutions to forming a curriculum than just using traditional beliefs.

Bobbitt went on and received a PhD from Clark University in 1909. From 1909 until his retirement in 1941, Bobbitt worked as faculty at the University of Chicago upon an initial invitation from Charles Hubbard Judd.

== Personal life ==
Bobbitt married his first wife, Sarah Annis, on June 2, 1903.

In 1937, Sarah Annis Bobbitt sued Franklin Bobbitt, citing "extreme cruelty", requesting a dissolution of their marriage, as well as a restraining order, due to allegations of physical beatings, verbal abuse, and molestations.

Later, Franklin Bobbitt remarried another woman named Mabel Deiwert in 1941, until his death in 1956.

== Curriculum ==
He felt that the curriculum was a way to prepare students for their future roles in the new industrial society. He influenced the curriculum by showing how teaching classical subjects should be replaced by teaching subjects that correspond to social needs. In 1918, Bobbitt wrote The Curriculum: a summary of the development concerning the theory of the curriculum. This became an official specialization in the education sciences. The entrance point of a curriculum was, according to Bobbitt, to see which results have to be accomplished.

Bobbitt felt that the curriculum has to adapt to the needs of an individual and to the needs of the new industrial society, people should not be taught what they would never use. They should only learn those skills which were necessary to fulfill their personal tasks. Education was according to Bobbitt primarily a preparation for adulthood and not for childhood or youth. This resulted in an early differentiation in education. Bobbitt was not a supporter of coeducation. In his view girls had a very different future than boys, so they did not need the same sort of education.

Bobbitt created five steps for curriculum making: (a) analysis of human experience, (b) job analysis, (c) deriving objectives, (d) selecting objectives, and (e) planning in detail. The first step was about separating all of human experience into major fields. This was followed by step two, where the fields were broken down into more specific activities. The third step was to form the objective from the abilities needed to perform the activities. Next is the fourth step, where the objectives are selected from to find ones that would serve as the basis for planning activities for the students. The last step was to lay out activities, experiences, and opportunities that would be needed to obtain the objectives.

Besides a change in the content of the curriculum, Bobbitt was also calling for the elimination of conventional school subjects. He preferred subjects that were themselves areas of living, such as citizenship and leisure (p97). Bobbitt also believed that schools were charged to provide society with what it needed as determined by scientific analyses (p100).

Bobbitt realized that there were too many activities (for example related to citizenship, health, spare time, parentship, work related activities and languages) to fit in any curriculum. A part of those activities were well taught by socialization, the so-called undirected experiences. This is why the curriculum has to aim at the particular subjects that are not sufficiently learned as a result of normal socialization, these subjects were described as shortcomings.
