= Problem-posing education =

Method of teaching coined by Paulo Freire

Problem-posing education, coined by the Brazilian educator Paulo Freire in his 1970 book Pedagogy of the Oppressed, is a method of teaching that emphasizes critical thinking for the purpose of liberation. Freire used problem posing as an alternative to the banking model of education.

== Origins ==
Freire's pedagogy emerged from his observations and experiences working as an instructor in literacy programs with peasant laborers in Brazil. During this work, Freire became aware of the economic, political, and social domination resulting from paternalism. Paternalism leads to a culture of silence, which keeps people from confronting their oppression. He turned this philosophy to pedagogy because "the whole education system was one of the major instruments for the maintenance of this culture of silence".

Freire's philosophy of education centers on critical consciousness, whereby the oppressed recognize the causes of their oppression "so that through transforming action they can create a new situation, one which makes possible the pursuit of fuller humanity". Problem-posing education is the path to critical consciousness.

Freire's work has its roots in the constructivist theory of learning, and specifically the work of Jean Piaget and John Dewey. The constructivist theory holds that knowledge is constructed by individuals by using their experiences, which is what Freire drew upon in developing his pedagogy. In Pedagogy of the Oppressed Freire wrote:

Education as the practice of freedom—as opposed to education as the practice of domination—denies that man is abstract, isolated, independent, and unattached to the world; it also denies that the world exists as a reality apart from people. Authentic reflection considers neither abstract man nor the world without people, but people in their relations with the world.

== Philosophy ==
The philosophy of problem-posing education is the foundation of modern critical pedagogy. Problem-posing education solves the student–teacher contradiction by recognizing that knowledge is not deposited from one (the teacher) to another (the student) but is instead formulated through dialogue between the two. Freire's argument concludes that "authentic education is not carried on by "A" for "B" or by "A" about "B", but rather by "A" with "B". The representation of knowledge rather than the imposition of it leads to liberation.

== Method ==
As a method of teaching, problem-posing involves "listening ..., dialogue ..., and action". Many models for applying problem-posing in the classroom have been formulated since Freire first coined the term.

One of the most influential models is the book Freire for the Classroom: A Sourcebook for Liberatory Teaching, edited by Ira Shor. When teachers implement problem-posing education in the classroom, they approach students as fellow learners and partners in dialogue (or dialoguers), which creates an atmosphere of hope, love, humility, and trust. This is done through six points of reference:

- Learners (students/teachers in dialogue) approach their acts of knowing as grounded in individual experience and circumstance.
- Learners approach the historical and cultural world as a transformable reality shaped by human ideological representations of reality.
- Learners make connections between their own conditions and the conditions produced through the making of reality.
- Learners consider the ways that they can shape this reality through their methods of knowing. This new reality is collective, shared, and shifting.
- Learners develop literacy skills that put their ideas into print, thus giving potency to the act of knowing.
- Learners identify the myths in the dominant discourse and work to destabilize these myths, ending the cycle of oppression.

== Examples ==
The Montessori method, developed by Maria Montessori, is an example of problem-posing education in an early childhood model.

Ira Shor, a professor of Composition and Rhetoric at CUNY, who has worked closely with Freire, also advocates a problem posing model in his use of critical pedagogy. He has published on the use of contract grading, the physical set-up of the classroom, and the political aspects of student and teacher roles.

James D. Kirylo, in his book, Paulo Freire: The Man from Recife, reiterated Freire's thought, and stated that a problem-posing education is one where human beings are viewed as conscious beings who are unfinished, yet in process of becoming.

Other advocates of problem-posing critical pedagogy include Henry Giroux, Peter McLaren, and bell hooks.

== See also ==
- Inquiry-based learning
- Problem-based learning
- Problem solving
- Unschooling
