= James D. Kirylo =

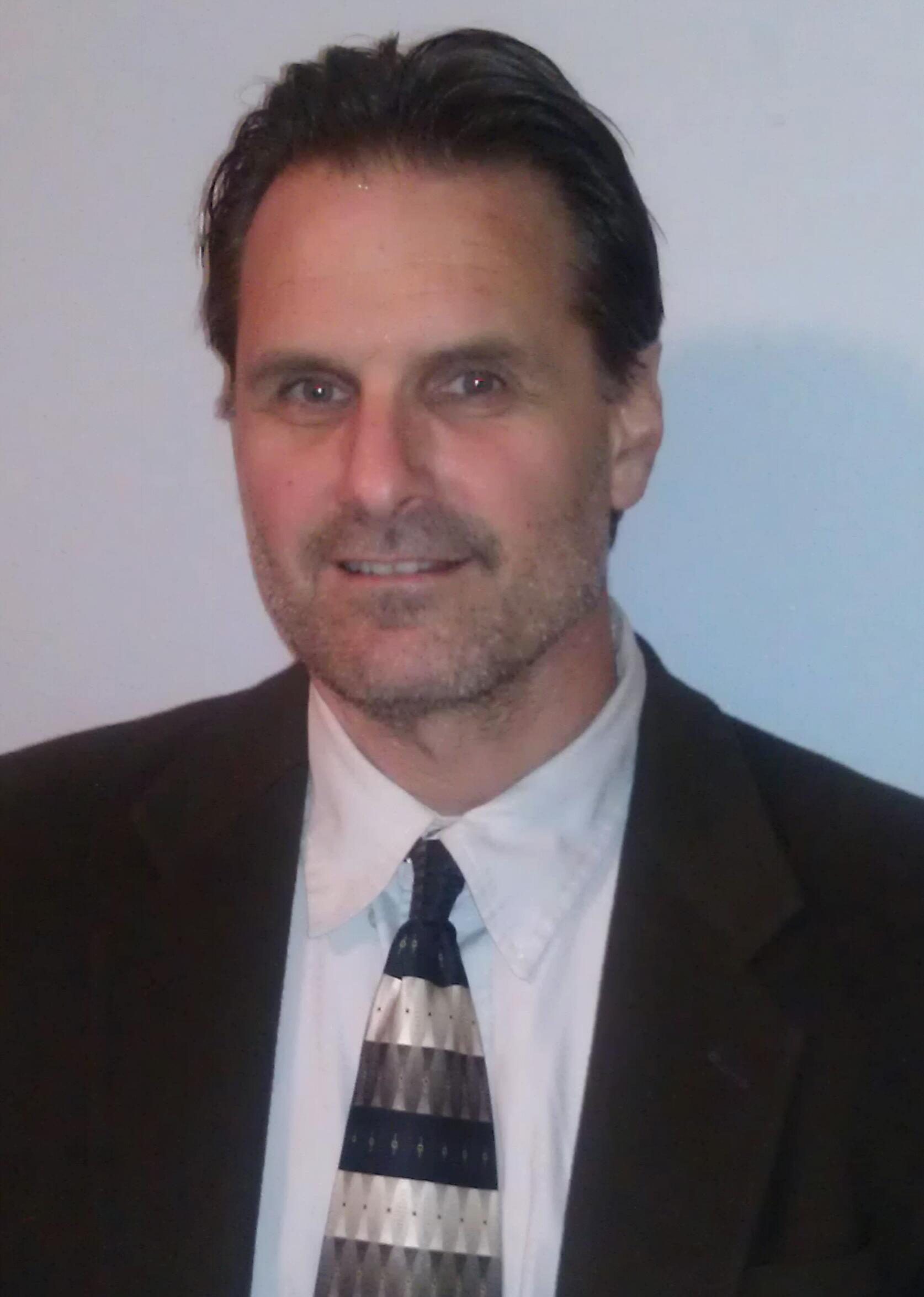
- Born: Livorno, Italy
- Occupation: professor

Academic background
- Influences: Paulo Freire, Oscar Romero, Gustavo Gutiérrez, Dorothy Day, John Dewey, Richard Rohr, Mother Teresa, Francis of Assisi, Martin Luther King Jr., Jean Piaget

Academic work
- Main interests: critical pedagogy, curriculum theory, liberation theology, multiculturalism, literacy

James David Kirylo is professor of education at the University of South Carolina who teaches courses that examine concepts associated with critical pedagogy, curriculum theorizing, teacher leadership, diversity and literacy. Among other books, he is author of Teaching with Purpose: An Inquiry into the Who, Why, and How We Teach, A Turning Point in Teacher Education: A Time for Resistance, Reflection and Change (with Jerry Aldridge), and Paulo Freire: The Man from Recife, which is one of the most comprehensive texts in English on the life and thought of Paulo Freire, significantly contributing to Freirean scholarship.

== Educator ==
Influenced by the work of Paulo Freire and other progressives, Kirylo suggests that education is not a neutral enterprise but a highly charged political affair, largely dictated by the voices that have the most capital power. More often than not, according to Kirylo, these particular voices have propagated a view of education and the notion of school reform as one that has morphed into a language that can be characterized as corporate speak.

Kirylo argues there are those who have become so enamored with the convenience of explaining school reform with detached terminology such as outcomes, results, performance, monetary rewards, takeover, competition, and comparing and contrasting that they have created a system analogous to describing a for-profit corporation, resulting in the creation of "winners" and "losers," ultimately fostering what he describes institutionalization of the depersonalization of education. Consequently, in order to ascertain the accuracy of who the winners and losers are, the infrastructure that protects that interest has to be secured. In the end, Kirylo suggests this type of system fosters the objectification of school-aged children, possesses an extraordinarily distorted view of what is educationally important, and largely blames teachers for anything that ails education. Moreover, this type of system has fostered a subtle and not-so-subtle move systematically to deprofessionalize the notion of teacher education and the teaching profession in general, all of which reduces teachers into mechanical functionaries, seriously preventing them from fostering critical thought, innovation, and creativity in actual classroom practice. Not only asserting that to be called an educator is an incredible responsibility and an earned privilege requiring involvement in the political process, Kirylo argues that schooling is a complex affair, suggesting educators collectively unite in challenging systems that propagate a corporate point of view of education. Kirylo has meaningfully contributed to the discourse of critical pedagogy and curriculum theorizing, and its link to liberation theology.

== See also ==
- Banking model of education
- Black theology
- Constructivism (philosophy of education)
- Critical consciousness
- Critical theory
- Dialogue
- Francisco Brennand
- Hegemony
- Hélder Câmara
- James Hal Cone
- Joe L. Kincheloe
- Peter McLaren
- Praxis (process)
- Preferential option for the poor
- Problem-posing education
- Shirley R. Steinberg

== Selected publications ==
- Kirylo, J. & Aldridge, Jerry. (2019). A Turning Point in Teacher Education: A Time for Resistance, Reflection, and Change. Lanham, MD: Rowman & Littlefield.
- Kirylo, J. (2016). Teaching with Purpose: An Inquiry into Who, Why, and How We Teach. Lanham, MD: Rowman & Littlefield.
- Kirylo, J. (Ed.) (2013). A Critical Pedagogy of Resistance: 34 Pedagogues We Need to Know. Rotterdam, Netherlands: Sense.
- Kirylo, J. (2011). Paulo Freire: The man from Recife. New York: Peter Lang.
- Kirylo, J. & Nauman, A. K. (Eds.) (2010). Curriculum development: Perspectives from around the world. Olney, MD: Association of Childhood Education International (ACEI).
- Kirylo, J. & McNulty, C. P. (2011). Introduction: Teacher education programs in the midst of change (Guest Editors for 2011 Annual Theme Issue). Childhood Education, 87(5), 315-317.
- Kirylo, J. (2011, Spring). An Interview with Ana Maria (Nita) Araújo Freire. Childhood Education, 87(3), 191-195.
- Kirylo, J. (2010, Fall). An Interview with Diane Ravitch. Childhood Education, 87(1), 48-52.
- Kirylo, J. (2009, Fall). The power of relationship and behavior management. Childhood Education, 86(1), 33-34.
- Kirylo, J. (2009, Spring). The election of Barack Obama: A teachable moment. Focus on Teacher Education: A Quarterly ACEI Publication for the Education Community, 9(3), 1, 6.
- Kirylo, J. (2007) Ten essential practices and attitudes: A guide for school teachers. Association for Childhood Education International (ACEI SPEAKS Brochure).
- Kirylo, J. & Nauman, A. (2006). The depersonalization of education and the language of accountability: A view from a local newspaper. Journal of Curriculum and Pedagogy, (3)1, 187-206.
- Kirylo, J. (2006). Preferential option for the poor: Making a pedagogical choice. Childhood Education, 82(5), 266-270 (Annual Theme Issue).
- Kirylo, J. (2006). What parents need to know about standardized testing. Association for Childhood Education International (ACEI SPEAKS Brochure).
- Kirylo, J. (2005/2006, Winter). Lessons: Katrina and Beginning Anew. Childhood Education, 82(2), 95-97.
- Kirylo, J. (2005). Standards and the sliding accountability scale: The making of a highly qualified secretary of education. Focus on Teacher Education: A Quarterly ACEI Publication for the Education Community, 6(2),1,6-7.
- Kirylo, J. (2005). The seduction of being entrenched in the circuit of our own truth and the antidote of humility. Journal of Curriculum and Pedagogy, (2)2, 28-30.
- Kirylo, J. (2005). Separation of church and state and public schools: A guide for parents. Association for Childhood Education International (ACEI SPEAKS Brochure).
- Kirylo, J. (2004). Teaching, learning, and reflecting: Essays on education. Asunción, Paraguay: Facultad de Lenguas Vivas-Evangelical University of Paraguay.
- Kirylo, J. (2004, Nov-Dec). Strange land. Radical Grace: A Publication of the Center for Action and Contemplation, 17(6), 11.
- Kirylo, J. (2002, Octubre). La grave situación de los probes y la reforma escolar. Docente. Trans. José Antonio Alonso. Año 3, Número 30, pp. 34–37.
- Kirylo, J. (2002, Agosto). "Yo enseño porque amo a los niños." Docente. Trans. José Antonio Alonso. Año 3, Número 28, pp. 16–20.
- Kirylo, J. (2001, Spring). A historical overview of liberation theology: Some implications for the Christian educator. Journal of Research on Christian Education, 10(1), 53-86.
- Kirylo, J. (1999). The discourse of the spirituality of liberation theology in curriculum theory. Journal of Curriculum Theorizing, 15(1), 77-87.
