= Emancipatory pedagogy =

Philosophy and practice that aims to liberate learners from oppression

Emancipatory pedagogy is a philosophy of education and practice that emphasizes liberating learners from any form of oppression that could limit their choices and control over their lives. It aims to create a more just and democratic society by empowering learners to critically examine their social and political realities and take action to transform them. Pioneers of critical and emancipatory pedagogy, such as bell hooks, have argued that education should be a practice of freedom. Rooted in critical pedagogy, emancipatory pedagogy challenges traditional educational practices that reinforce societal inequalities. Emancipatory pedagogy can be applied in various educational settings, including schools, universities, and community-based organizations.

== History ==
Emancipatory pedagogy draws inspiration from various sources, including the work of Paulo Freire, a Brazilian educator and philosopher. Freire's experiences with marginalized communities in Brazil shaped his belief in education as a tool for liberation and empowerment. His book, Pedagogy of the Oppressed, published in 1968, laid the foundation for critical pedagogy and its emancipatory aims.

=== Key figures ===
Several key figures and thinkers have contributed to the development and application of emancipatory pedagogy:

- Paulo Freire: A Brazilian educator and philosopher who emphasized education as a tool for liberation and empowerment. His work, particularly Pedagogy of the Oppressed, is foundational to critical pedagogy and its emancipatory aims.
- bell hooks: An American author, feminist, and social activist who explored the intersections of race, class, and gender in education. She advocated for engaged pedagogy that recognizes the lived experiences of students and challenges oppressive systems.
- Henry Giroux: A Canadian-American scholar and cultural critic who has written extensively on critical pedagogy, youth culture, and public intellectuals. He emphasizes the role of education in creating a more just and democratic society.
- Ira Shor: An American educator and author who has focused on critical teaching and the development of democratic classrooms. He emphasizes the importance of dialogue, critical reflection, and student empowerment in education.
- Peter McLaren: A critical pedagogue who emphasizes the importance of understanding the relationship between power, language, and ideology in education. He advocates for transformative education that challenges social inequalities.

== Principles and Goals ==
=== Principles ===
Learners are encouraged to critically examine their own beliefs, values, and assumptions, as well as the social and political structures that shape their lives. They are to be active participants in the learning process, with their voices and experiences valued and respected.

Open and honest communication between learners and educators is seen as important for creating a democratic and inclusive learning environment. This includes "dialogic" or "problem-posing" pedagogy, where communication fosters critical thinking and collaborative knowledge construction. Relationships between learners and educators being respectful and supportive is seen as important for creating a positive and empowering learning environment.

Education is seen as a transformative process that can lead to personal and social change. This aligns with the concept of prefigurative politics, where the process of education itself embodies the desired social transformation. Emancipatory pedagogy is committed to promoting social justice and challenging all forms of oppression.

=== Goals ===
A central goal of emancipatory pedagogy is developing critical consciousness. Learners are encouraged to develop an awareness of the social, political, and economic forces that influence their lives and the lives of others. This involves moving beyond the banking model of education, where knowledge is passively received, and instead engaging in active inquiry and critical analysis. Emancipatory pedagogy also aims to empower learners to gain the knowledge, skills, and confidence to challenge oppressive systems and create positive change. A further goal is fostering democratic participation, through learners developing the ability to participate in democratic processes and contribute to a more just and equitable society.

=== The Five E's of Emancipatory Pedagogy ===
Emancipatory pedagogy can be further understood through the framework of the five "E's":

- Engage: Creating a learning environment that is stimulating, relevant, and encourages active participation.
- Explore: Providing opportunities for learners to investigate, question, and experiment with ideas and concepts.
- Explain: Facilitating understanding and meaning-making through dialogue, discussion, and critical analysis.
- Elaborate: Encouraging learners to apply their knowledge and skills to new situations and real-world problems.
- Evaluate: Assessing learning and progress in a way that is meaningful, authentic, and promotes self-reflection.

== Applications ==
=== Cultural relevance and engagement ===
Educators can create learning experiences that are relevant to the cultural backgrounds and experiences of their learners. This might involve incorporating culturally relevant materials, using culturally responsive teaching strategies, and creating a classroom environment that values diversity and inclusivity.

Curriculum development can be guided by "generative themes" that emerge from the lived experiences and social realities of learners. This approach ensures that learning is relevant and meaningful to students, while also connecting to broader social and political issues. Technology further enhances these approaches by facilitating critical thinking, collaboration, and social action. For example, students can use Google Images and Maps to explore how concepts are shaped by colonial imaginaries and how these imaginaries are embedded in online platforms.

=== Critical thinking and social analysis ===
By applying the practices of emancipatory pedagogy, learners develop the ability to critically analyze texts and media messages and understand how they can perpetuate or challenge power structures. This might involve examining the hidden biases in textbooks, deconstructing media representations of marginalized groups, or creating alternative media that promotes social justice. Learners identifying and analyzing real-world problems encourages critical thinking, problem-solving skills, and a sense of agency among them. For example, students might investigate local environmental issues, analyze social inequalities in their community, or propose solutions to global challenges.

=== Social action and change ===
Learners and educators work together to investigate issues of social justice and take action to address them. This approach combines research with social action, empowering learners to become agents of change in their communities. For example, students might conduct research on local homelessness, collaborate with community organizations to address the issue, and advocate for policy changes.

Emancipatory pedagogy can be used to address specific social justice issues, such as racism, sexism, and economic inequality. For example, in a classroom setting, students might engage in critical discussions about racial stereotypes, analyze the impact of sexism on women's lives, or explore the root causes of poverty and economic inequality.

== Criticism and limitations ==
Some critics argue that key concepts like "conscientization" are not clearly defined, making it difficult to implement emancipatory pedagogy in practice. For example, some educators may struggle to operationalize the concept of conscientization in their teaching, leading to inconsistencies in implementation. Use of Marxist and academic jargon can be a barrier to understanding and accessibility for some learners. This can create a sense of exclusion for learners who are not familiar with these terms, potentially hindering their engagement with the material.

Some critics argue that emancipatory pedagogy can be overly directive, potentially limiting learner autonomy and freedom of thought. While the intention is to empower learners, some critics suggest that the emphasis on critical analysis and social justice may inadvertently steer learners towards specific conclusions or perspectives.

Implementing emancipatory pedagogy can be challenging in traditional educational settings that prioritize standardized testing and teacher-centered instruction. The emphasis on critical thinking and social action may clash with the demands of standardized curricula and assessment, creating tension for educators who are trying to implement emancipatory approaches. This tension is particularly evident in educational systems where high-stakes testing and standardized curricula are dominant.
