= Critical literacy =

Ability to find embedded discrimination in media

Critical literacy is the application of critical social theory to literacy. Critical literacy finds embedded discrimination in media by analyzing the messages promoting prejudiced power relationships found naturally in media and written material that go unnoticed otherwise by reading beyond the author's words and examining the manner in which the author has conveyed their ideas about society's norms to determine whether these ideas contain racial or gender inequality.

== Overview ==
Critical literacy is an instructional approach that advocates the adoption of "critical" perspectives toward text. Critical literacy is actively analysing texts and includes strategies for what proponents describe as uncovering underlying messages. The purpose of critical literacy is to create a self-awareness of the topic at hand. There are several different theoretical perspectives on critical literacy that have produced different pedagogical approaches. These approaches share the basic premise that literacy requires consumers of text to adopt a critical and questioning approach.

When students examine the writer's message for bias, they are practicing critical literacy. This skill of actively engaging with the text can be used to help students become more perceptive and socially aware people who do not receive the messages around them from media, books, and images without first taking apart the text and relating its messages back to their own personal life experiences. Thus by getting students to question the power structures in their society, critical literacy teaches them how to dispute these written and oral views regarding issues of equality so that they may combat the social injustices against marginalized groups in their communities.

According to proponents of critical literacy, the practice is not a means of attaining literacy in the sense of improving the ability to understand words, syntax, etc. With this idea in mind, students are able to look at what they are being taught as well as assessing what they are learning to their own situation. This means they are creating deeper meaning rather than studying content only.

Critical literacy has become a popular approach to teaching English to students in some English speaking-countries, including Canada, Australia, New Zealand, and the UK.

For post-structuralist practitioners of critical literacy, the definition of this practice can be quite malleable, but usually involves a search for discourses and representations, and reasons why certain discourses are included in or omitted from a text.

Two major theoretical perspectives within the field of critical literacy are the Neo-Marxist/Freirean and the Australian. These approaches overlap in many ways and they do not necessarily represent competing views, but they do approach the subject matter differently

== Relationship to critical thinking ==
While critical literacy and critical thinking involve similar steps and may overlap, they are not interchangeable. Critical thinking is done when one troubleshoots problems and solves them through a process involving logic and mental analysis. This is because critical thinking focuses on ensuring that one's arguments are sufficiently supported by evidence and void of unclear or deceptive presentation. Thus, critical thinking attempts to understand the outside world and recognize that there are other arguments beyond one's own by evaluating their reasoning for such arguments, but critical thinking does not go further beyond revealing a loaded claim.

To make sense of the biases embedded within these claims first uncovered by critical thinking, critical literacy goes beyond identifying the problem to also analyzing the power dynamics that create the written or oral texts of society and then questioning their claims. Therefore, critical literacy examines the language and wording of politics within these texts and how politics uses certain aspects of grammar to convey its intended meaning. Practicing critical literacy lets students challenge both the author of the text in addition to the social and historical contexts in which the text was produced.

In addition to print sources, critical literacy also evaluates media and technology by looking at who owns these forms of information as well as to whom they are writing and their goal in creating these various texts. Students look at the underlying information being communicated in literature, popular and online media, and journalism in the hopes of taking social action.

== History ==
Critical literacy practices grew out of the social justice pedagogy of Brazilian educator and theorist Paulo Freire, described in his 1967 Education as the Practice of Freedom and his 1968 Pedagogy of the Oppressed. Freirean critical literacy is conceived as a means of empowering populations against oppression and coercion, frequently seen as enacted by corporations or governments. Freirean critical literacy starts with the desire to balance social inequities and address societal problems caused by abuse of power – it is an analysis with an agenda. It proceeds from this philosophical basis to examine, analyze, and deconstruct texts.

Critical literacy was later established more prominently with Donaldo Macedo in 1987. In his 1968 book, Pedagogy of the Oppressed, Paulo Freire writes that individuals who are oppressed by those in positions of power are initially afraid to have freedom since they have internalized the rules of their oppressors and the consequences of not abiding by these rules. Thus, despite their internal desire for freedom, they continue to live in what Freire calls the "fear of freedom", following a pre-set prescription of behaviors that meet their oppressors' approval. In order to understand the actual nature of their oppression, Freire states that their education must teach them to understand that their reality can be changed and with it, their oppression.

This perspective is reflected in the works of Peter McLaren, Henry Giroux, and Jean Anyon, among many others. The Freirean perspective on critical literacy is strongly represented in critical pedagogy.

Critical pedagogy seeks to fight oppression by changing the way schools teach. From this emerges critical literacy, which states that by working to comprehend the way in which texts are written and presented, one may understand the political, social, and economic environments in which the text was formed as well as be able to identify hidden ideologies within such texts.

Other philosophical approaches to critical literacy, while sharing many of the ideas of Neo-Marxist/Freirean critical literacy, may be viewed as a less overtly politicized expansion on these ideas. Critical literacy helps teachers as well as students to explore the relationship between theoretical framework and its practical implications.

== Factors ==
Freire includes several basic factors in his formation of critical literacy. The first step of critical literacy involves bringing awareness, or "consciousness" as Freire terms it, to those who are mistreated and to those who bring about this mistreatment through promoting unfair ideologies via politics and other positions of power, such as schools and government. This is because Freire and Macedo hold that written texts also represent information that has been built on previous schemas about the world since the mistreated often are not conscious that they are oppressed, viewing their poverty or marginalization as a natural part of life. Accepting their hardship, they do not know the steps that would end their oppression.

The second factor of critical literacy seeks to transform the way in which the schools teach. Ira Shor writes that critical literacy can be used to reveal one's subjective beliefs about the world by causing them to question their personal assumptions through using words. Able to be tailored to work with diverse ideas relating to feminism or neo-Marxism, critical literacy presents students with different ways of thinking about their self-development by challenging them to consider differing perspectives about issues rather than settle with the cultural norms and status quo. The goal of this is to lead students to promote social action within their community to change unjust structures.

It is accomplished through advocating honest dialogue between the teacher and students in which both parties learn together through critical discussion of important issues rather than follow a banking model of education, which is a traditional method of teaching that treats students as empty containers, to be filled by teachers whose primary roles are to lecture and pass on information that students must receive and recite during tests. Freire was not a proponent of the banking model because he believed rather than creating conscious knowledge within students, this model he claimed perpetuated oppression.

When teachers facilitate discussion between students regarding the controversial issues that pertain to them and their society, this honest dialogue acts as a bridge to allow students to question the social inequalities in their own communities and the underlying hierarchies that govern these prejudices. Honest dialogue between instructor and student leads students to the third factor: critical reflection of how they can apply the knowledge they have discovered through dialogue to their own life situations in order to take concrete actions to change society and right injustices.

== Teaching critical literacy ==
By teaching critical literacy, teachers can help students take action by expanding their mindsets to better understanding the perspectives of other overlooked groups in society and thus, grow in appreciation for those who have a different culture and language than they do.

Teachers can adapt the teaching of critical literacy to their classrooms by encouraging students to read analytically and challenge the social norms found in texts. They can form their own ideas to dispute the text and write a response to oppose, or support, its claims. Teachers can let students research social justice topic that they are interested in. This can lead students taking personal responsibility for social change in their communities. Having students dissect different texts from various sources and authors in order to uncover the authors' biases resulting from his or her ingrained ideas of norms is another method for developing the skill of critical literacy as well as having students rewrite passages they read but from the viewpoints and circumstances of oppressed minority groups. Reading a multitude of different texts or additional readings that accompany the text can also help students practice critical literacy. One example of a modality that can aid students with their critical literacy skills is the use of a film. The use of a film can be implemented in a variety of different classes including: history, science, literature, and so on. By utilizing a film or other visual modality, students are able to become engaged in the content in a way they would have not gotten in a traditional lesson. Visual modalities like graphic novels give students a better chance to understand and create meaning behind the information they are given. This in turn allows students to provide more evidence and theories behind the information.

Students’ growth in critical consciousness through their writing reminds teaching practitioners, policy-makers, and teacher educators to provide innovation in their classrooms to empower language learners with teaching methodologies contrary to what they are accustomed to during their learning.

=== Student skills ===
Critical literacy allows students to develop their ability to understand the messages found in online articles and other sources of media such as news stations or journalism through careful analysis of the text and how the text is presented.

Critical literacy teaches students how to identify discrimination within institutions of power and then to question these power dynamics when they appear in written and oral texts so that students may comprehend why certain topics such as racial slurs are controversial in society. Teachers help foster students' higher order thinking through in-class discussions about these social topics in what is known as a dialogic environment. Here, the traditional banking model of teaching is replaced by teachers giving students a chance to openly express their ideas and thoughts on the issues being taught in class.

Thirdly, critical literacy aids the growth of reading skills by allowing students to actively relate various texts to other texts to determine if the overall messages promote or discourages the marginalization of minority groups. Younger children can also learn to practice critical literacy by having a teacher read picture books out loud to them as the children learn to examine what messages the images and paragraphs in the picture books convey. By encouraging students to find ways these social issues relate to their own personal lives, students' minds are expanded to see cultural and racial differences as a positive thing.

Lastly, critical literacy prepares students to recognize the importance of language in the formation of politics, social hierarchy, race, and power because the way in which phrases are worded can impact the overall message. This also appears in the realm of education as schools and teachers must determine whether they will teach and request that students use only the standard academic dialect in class or allow them to continue using the dialect they learned in the home. Critical literacy causes students to rethink which variation of language they speak since the standard dialect is the prevalent one and contains more power.

== See also ==
- Allan Luke
- Colin Lankshear
- Critical reading
- Culture jamming
- Discourse
- Henry Jenkins
- Information literacy
- Intertextuality
- Mashup
- Media literacy
- Meme
- Memetics
- Participatory culture
- Paulo Freire
- Popular culture
- Postpositivism
- Scenario planning
- Semiotics
- Transmediation
- Visual literacy
