= Rouge Forum =

Organization of educational activists for social justice

The Rouge Forum is an organization of educational activists, which focuses on issues of equality, democracy, and social justice.

== Origins ==
The Rouge Forum emerged from a series of political controversies within the National Council for the Social Studies (NCSS) during the 1990s. In particular, two events at the 1994 annual meeting of NCSS in Phoenix galvanized a small group of activists who later founded the organization. First, a staff person from the Central Committee for Conscientious Objectors (CCCO) was arrested for leafleting at the NCSS conference; and secondly, the governing body of NCSS rejected a resolution condemning California Proposition 187 and calling for a boycott of California as a site for future meetings of the NCSS. These events fueled a level of political activism the NCSS had rarely experienced and identified the need for organized action in support of free speech and anti-racist pedagogy in the field of social studies education in general and within NCSS in particular.

The Rouge Forum was formally organized and held its first meeting in Detroit at Wayne State University in 1998 with around 300 education activists present. Continued activism within NCSS remained a major topic of discussion at this meeting, however, the organization's concerns were broadened by the participation of teachers and teachers educators working in the areas of literacy and special education. Rouge Forum members have worked closely with, and played leadership roles within the inclusive school and whole language literacy movements.

For several years in early 2000s, The Rouge Forum, The Whole Schooling Consortium, and the Whole Language Umbrella of the National Council of Teachers of English held joint meetings and co-sponsored the 2000 International Education Summit for a Democratic Society.

== Activism ==
A key principle underlying the actions of the Rouge Forum is their belief that schools and educators play a critical role in the creation of a more democratic, egalitarian society (or a society that increases in inequality and authoritarianism). The Rouge Forum connects analysis of imperialism, war, and the regulation of schooling.

The Rouge Forum has been active in efforts to resist curriculum standardization and high-stakes testing in schools, particularly as a result of the No Child Left Behind Act.

== The Rouge Forum News ==
The Rouge Forum published a newspaper/zine from 1999 to 2010. The Rouge Forum News appeared twice a year in both print and online editions from 1999-2004. In 2009, The Rouge Forum News returned to a regular publication schedule as a digital zine. After five issues as a digital zine, The Rouge Forum News published its seventeenth and final issue in the fall of 2010.

== Rouge Forum meetings and conferences ==
The Rouge Forum held meetings on a regular basis at both local and national levels from 1998-2017. The national conferences were held on a more or less annual basis; all meetings were action-oriented and the national conferences usually included workshops for teachers and students; panel discussions; community-building and cultural events; as well as academic presentations. National conferences were held in Detroit (1998, 1999, 2000, 2007, 2013), Rochester, NY (1999), Albany, NY (2000), Bethesda, MD (2002), Louisville, KY (2003, 2008), Syracuse, NY (2004), Ypsilanti, MI (2009), Williams Bay, WI (2010), Romeoville, IL (2011), Vancouver, Canada (2012), Oxford, OH (2012), Denver, CO (2014), Calgary, Canada (2016), and St. Louis, MO (2017).

Many prominent voices for democracy and critical pedagogy have participated in Rouge Forum meetings. From 2011-2017 the national conference featured the Adam Renner Education for Social Justice Memorial Lecture. Renner was a teacher, professor, and social activist, who was also a key leader in The Rouge Forum. Renner Lecturers included Peter McLaren, Susan Ohanian, Patrick Shannon, David Barsamian, E. Wayne Ross, and Sarah Kendzior.

== Related reading ==
Books

- Agostinone Wilson, Faith. (2013). Dialectical research methods in the classical Marxist tradition. New York: Peter Lang
- Brosio, Richard. (1994). A radical democratic critique of capitalist education. New York: Peter Lang.
- Carr, Paul R., & Porfilio, Brad J. (Eds.). (2011). The phenomenon of Obama and the agenda for education. Charlotte, NC: IAP.
- Daniels, Emily, & Porfilio, Brad J. (Eds.). (2013). Dangerous counterstories in the corporate academy: Narrating for understanding, solidarity, resistance, and community in the age of neoliberalism. Charlotte, NC: IAP.
- DeLeon, Abraham P., & Ross, E. Wayne. (2010). Critical theories, radical pedagogies, and social education. Rotterdam: Sense Publishers.
- Emery, Kathy, & Ohanian, Susan. (2004). Why is corporate America bashing our public schools? Portsmouth, NH: Heinnemann.
- Gabbard, David A., & Ross, E. Wayne. (2008). Education under the security state. New York: Teachers College Press.
- Gorlewski, Julie, & Porfilio, Brad J. (Eds.). (2013). Left behind in the race to the top: Realities of school reform. Charlotte, NC: IAP.
- Hill, Dave. (Ed.). (2009). Contesting neoliberal education: Public resistance and collective advance. London: New York: Routledge.
- Hill, Dave. (Ed.). (2009). The rich world and the impoverishment of education: Diminishing democracy, equity and workers' rights. New York: Routledge.
- Hill, Dave, & Kumar, Ravi. (Eds.). (2009). Global neoliberalism and education and its consequences. New York: Routledge.
- Hursh, David W. (2008). High-stakes testing and the decline of teaching and learning: The real crisis in education. Lanham, MD: Rowman & Littlefield.
- Mathison, Sandra, & Ross, E. Wayne. (Eds.). (2008). Battleground schools (Volumes 1-2). Westport, CT: Greenwood Press.
- Mathison, Sandra, & Ross, E. Wayne. (Eds.). (2008). The nature and limits of standards-based reform and assessment. New York: Teachers College Press.
- Malott, Curry S., Cole, Mike, & Elmore, John M. (Eds.). (2013). Teaching Marx: The socialist challenge. Charlotte, NC: IAP.
- Malott, Curry S., & Porfilio, Brad J. (Eds.). (2011). Critical pedagogy in the Twenty-First Century: A new generation of scholars. Charlotte, NC: IAP.
- McCrary, N. E., & Ross, E. W. (Eds.). (2016). Working for Social Justice Inside and Outside the Classroom: A Community of Students, Teachers, Researchers, and Activists. New York: Peter Lang.
- McLaren, Peter. (2006). An Introduction to Critical Pedagogy in the Foundations of Education (5th Edition). London: Pearson.
- McLaren, Peter. (2005). Capitalists and conquerors : a critical pedagogy against empire. Lanham, MD: Rowman & Littlefield.
- Paraskeva, João, Ross, E. Wayne, & Hursh, David. (Eds.).(2006). Marxismo e educação. Porto, Portugal: ProfEdições.
- Peterson, Michael, & Hittie, Mishael Marie . (2009). Inclusive teaching : The journey towards effective schools for all learners. Upper Saddle River, N.J. : Merrill.
- Porfilio, Brad, & Viola, M. J. (2013). Hip-hop(e): The cultural practice and critical pedagogy of international hip-hop. New York: Peter Lang.
- Renner, Adam. (2002). Butterflies, boundaries, and breadfruit: The shared story of a service learning experience in Jamaica. PhD diss., University of Tennessee.
- Ross, E. Wayne. (2017). "Rethinking social studies: Critical pedagogy in pursuit of dangerous citizenship." Charlotte, NC: Information Age Publishing.
- Ross, E. Wayne. (2024). The social studies curriculum: Purposes, problems, and possibilities (5th Ed.). Albany: SUNY Press.
- Ross, E. Wayne., & Gibson, Rich. (Eds.). (2013). Education for revolution. Works & Days, 61/62, 31 and Cultural Logic, 20.
- Ross, E. Wayne, & Gibson, Rich. (Eds.). (2007). Neoliberalism and education reform. Cresskill, NJ: Hampton Press.
- Selwyn, Doug. (2009). Following the threads: Bringing inquiry research into the classroom. New York: Peter Lang.
- Shannon, Patrick. (2007). Reading against democracy: The broken promises of reading instruction. Portsmouth, NH: Heinnemann.
- Strauss, Steven L. (2005). The linguistics, neurology, and politics of phonics: Silent "E" speaks out. Mahwah, NJ: Lawrence Erlbaum.
- Vinson, Kevin D., & Ross, E. Wayne. (2003). Image and education: Teaching in the face of the new disciplinarity. New York: Peter Lang.

Journals

- Critical Education
- Cultural Logic
- Journal for Critical Education Policy Studies
- Workplace: A Journal for Academic Labor

Newspapers

- Substance News
- The Rouge Forum News

== See also ==
- Anti-oppressive education
- Critical consciousness
- Critical pedagogy
- Democratic schools
- High-stakes testing
- Inclusive school
- Social criticism
- Student voice
- Teaching for social justice
