= Anti-oppressive education =

Approaches to learning that challenge oppression

Anti-oppressive education encompasses multiple approaches to learning that actively challenge forms of oppression.

== Concept ==
Anti-oppressive education is premised on the notion that many traditional and commonsense ways of engaging in "education" actually contribute to oppression in schools and society. It also relies on the notion that many "common sense" approaches to education reform mask or exacerbate oppressive education methods.

The consequences of anti-oppressive education include a deep commitment to changing how educators conceptualize and engage in curriculum, pedagogy, classroom management and school culture. There is also an implication that institutional structure and policies must be transformed. Exploring perspectives on education that do not conform to what has become "common sense" must be partaken as well. Anti-oppressive education expects to be different, perhaps uncomfortable, and even controversial.

== Practice ==
Currently, there seem to be four main perspectives in anti-oppression education, as defined by Kumashiro (2000, p. 25) "Education for the Other, Education about the Other, Education that is Critical of Privileging and Othering, and Education that Changes Students and Society". These approaches come with some controversy, particularly in terms of the potential for upholding hierarchies. Despite controversy, anti-oppressive perspectives are echoed by other social justice writers in education. Both Bell and Benn-John encourage teachers to value and incorporate the narratives and leadership of oppressed and marginalized groups. Bell recommends specific steps, such as being a responsible ally, deconstructing binaries, and analyzing power. Research shows us that in Ontario most teachers are white. This means that it is up to educators to lean into the discomfort of critical questioning. Benn-John reiterates that the work of decolonization begins within each individual.

== Pedagogy of the Oppressed ==
In Paulo Freire's Pedagogy of the Oppressed (first published in Portuguese in 1968, then in English in 1970), he stated that education is suffering from "narration sickness"; students simply memorize mechanically the narrated content transmitted by the educator. This is the banking model of education, in which the scope of action allowed by the students extends only as far as receiving, filling and storing the deposits. Thus, projecting an absolute ignorance onto others, a characteristic of the ideology of oppression, negates education and knowledge as a process of inquiry. As a result, the more students work at storing these deposits entrusted to them, the less they develop the critical consciousness that would result from their intervention in the world as transformers of that world. As a result, oppressive social controls are never questioned and remain as an integral part of our culture thus, perpetuating oppression in our education systems.

== See also ==
- Anti-bias curriculum
- Abolitionist Teaching
- Critical pedagogy
- Democratic education
- Sudbury school
- Rouge Forum
- Social justice
