= Critical Pedagogy Primer =

2008 book by Joe L. Kincheloe

- Cover
- Author: Joe L. Kincheloe
- Language: English
- Subject: Pedagogy
- Publisher: Peter Lang
- Publication date: 2008

Critical Pedagogy Primer is a book by Joe L. Kincheloe published by Peter Lang. Like other "primers" published by Peter Lang, it is an introductory text on the topic of critical pedagogy aimed at a wider audience with its use of more accessible language. The book has wide margins suitable for reader annotations, and many terms and their definitions are included in these margins for accessibility.

Kincheloe not only introduces the topic of critical pedagogy, but he makes efforts to visualize the future of critical pedagogy through his notion of "evolving criticality" and the ever-changing field of critical theory.

== Summary ==
The 182-page work is split into five chapters, including the introduction. The introduction serves the aim and purpose of explicating the role of critical pedagogy in a democratic society, insisting that "questions of democracy and justice cannot be separated from the most fundamental features of teaching and learning" (p. 5). Chapter two discusses the foundations of critical pedagogy. Chapter three explains the role and implementation of the educational philosophy in schools. Chapter four explains the role of critical pedagogy in research and chapter five explains critical pedagogy and cognition.

The central characteristics of critical pedagogy are offered with the admission that his "take" reflects his own biases. His take being that critical pedagogy is grounded in a larger educational vision of justice and equality that charges educators with the responsibility of helping students "identify the insidious forces that subvert" their success, which makes the philosophy inherently political.

To ask such students to start over, to relearn the arts and sciences in light of these political concerns, is admittedly an ambitious task. Even so, this is exactly what critical pedagogy does.

Kincheloe explains that critical pedagogy is dedicated to ameliorating human suffering, and he is critical of neoliberal policy and "market-driven, globalized economic systems pushed on the world by the United States and other industrialized nations via the World Trade Organization (WTO) and the International Monetary Fund (IMF)," as he believes they have worsened worldwide poverty. Critical pedagogy in schools, by extension, is proposed to ensure that schools do their students no harm by blaming students for their own failures or fail to honor the knowledge that students bring every day with them to the classroom. He regards student anger and disillusionment with the school system as a logical response to a system which is hostile to them. He cites tracking as one of the examples of this hostility.

Critical pedagogy will not stand for these mechanisms of social and educational stratification that hurt socially, linguistically, and economically marginalized students so badly... [S]uccess in school may come only with a rejection of their ethnic and/or class backgrounds.

Kincheloe explains that critical pedagogy is "enacted through the use of 'generative themes' to read the word and the world and the process of problem posing." Drawing from the Brazilian educator and philosopher Paulo Freire, Kincheloe identifies a curriculum that poses students as researchers and classrooms and teachers that are problem posers. The education becomes student centered, identifying what is critical to their well-being in terms of the questions worth evaluating. Teachers then must become researchers of their students in order to help facilitate framing the problems their students face in a context in which they can be solved. The teacher does not abdicate responsibility for their classroom, but has to remain very much in a position of authority as someone who has command of their subject matter. According to Kincheloe, this is often a mistaken interpretation of the critque of the banking model of education highlighted in Freire's Pedagogy of the Oppressed. Freire told Kincheloe shortly before his death that "teachers often provide students with knowledge that students then react to, reject, reinterpret, analyze, and put into action."

Kincheloe is also critical of positivism and states that its critique is central to critical pedagogy (but also critical theory in general). The aim of the philosophy is to reduce the impulse to be reductive about student complexity, as "all human experience is marked by uncertainties." This idea is also cast onto the idea of science as a force to regulate, and critical pedagogy demands a "study of science in cultural and historical contexts, asking questions of the uses to which it has been put and whose interests it serves," because of the worry that dominant points of view can and will be normalized. One goal of critical pedagogy is to dismantle appropriations of what should be democratic assemblages.

This resistance to dominating powers, which has its roots in Marxism, is again part of critical pedagogy's aim to alleviate suffering. Kincheloe outlines how the roots of critical pedagogy also come from the Frankfurt School of critical theory, which goes beyond Marxist ideology that does not recognize that in the 21st century there are many more forms of power than capital.
