= Richard Courtney (disambiguation) =

Richard Courtney is an academic.

Richard Courtney may also refer to:

- Richard Edmond Courtney
- C. Richard Courtney, character in We're in the Money (film)

== See also ==
- Richard Courtenay (disambiguation)
