= Literacy with an Attitude =

Book by Patrick Finn

- Author: Patrick J. Finn
- Publisher: State Univ of New York Press
- Publication date: 1999
- ISBN: 9780791442869

Literacy with an Attitude, written by Patrick J. Finn, attempts to redefine literacy as the term exists within the education field. In his professional life, Finn served as an Associate Professor Emeritus of the Graduate School of Education from the University of Buffalo. He also and co-chairs a committee of Urban Education through the University of Buffalo that helps provide support for the schools and school districts in Buffalo, NY. His book outlines the differences between 'domesticating' and 'liberating' education, and offers advice on how to fix the discrepancy between upper and lower class schools. Finn references studies conducted by other published authors within the field of education, including Jean Anyon and James Gee.

== Reception ==
=== At publication ===
When the book was first published, education scholars had mixed reviews. Some, like John M. Watkins, note that the book holds to strong ideals that cannot be enacted. In his review, Watkins states that Literacy with an Attitude is "passionate" and "urgent". He says that Finn does not present himself at a distance from the subject. Instead, Watkins states that this book should be read by those who are worried about the failure of schools in their attempts to "Educate all our citizens into a powerful democratic discourse". However, Watkins believes that we will not be able to utilize Finn's advice. He states that he does not believe that we have the will and that we will not be able to "help working-class children develop literacy with an attitude".

Throughout his review, Watkins repeatedly mentions his "discomfort" that occurred while reading Literacy with an Attitude. Watkins attributes this "discomfort" to the direct nature of Finn's writing. Watkins states that the most uncomfortable moment was Finn's personal anecdote of "his own painful realizations of the extent to which public education has betrayed him".

In contrast, Honey Halpern notes that the book presents great contributions to the education community. In her review, Halpern states that Finn's book opened up "new and perceptive ways of looking at familiar situations" in education. Throughout her review, she notes that Finn's identification of politics in education is outwardly insightful. Halpern argues that the change that Finn is looking for is possible through aligning curriculum with powerful literacy. She concludes by urging that all teachers learn about the effective ways to help middle class students become literate.

=== Since publication ===
Literacy with an Attitude has been accepted by others in the education field, including Donna E. Alvermann, a professor of Literacy at the University of Georgia, who has served as the director of the National Reading Research Center, and has published extensively on literacy and popular culture. Alvermann referenced Finn’s discussion of “domesticating education” in her article “Reading adolescents’ reading identities: Looking back to see ahead,” to point out the flaws of the “deprivation approach” an approach to literacy that suggests struggling readers are disadvantaged. She says that when students are thought of this way, they often receive domesticating education and social inequality. For that reason, the label “struggling reader” should be avoided.

Rosalie Romano, an education professor at Western Washington University, explained in her review that Finn's argument on teaching powerful literacy as a matter of justice is significant to societal challenges to "our environment, to our infrastructure, to our social systems, and to our public institutions". The approach to literacy that she approaches in response to "Literacy with an Attitude" is one of engagement and purpose in a democratic society.

Critiques of Literacy with an Attitude come from Whiting in his outline of the book; he states that although Finn has a well put together argument, he does not provide readers with practical and applicable solutions to enact.

=== Influence on the education community ===
Finn’s book influenced the research for the book Urban Education with an Attitude, which seeks to empower and reform the individuals that are ingrained in urban education curriculum. The authors use the basic principles of Finn’s Literacy with an Attitude to model their solutions for the problems that circulate in urban education. Romano states that his idea of powerful literacy can be translated to teaching social activism throughout American history and its purposes. His research on working class schools and their deficiencies is often cited and referred to in the education community in articles that advocate for change.
