= Kevin Kumashiro =

Asian-American Marxist pedagogy professor

Kevin Kumashiro is the former dean of the School of Education at the University of San Francisco. He was previously a professor of Asian American Studies and Education at the University of Illinois at Chicago (UIC) and is the immediate past president of the National Association for Multicultural Education (NAME).

Kumashiro has taught many subjects to various grade levels in a wide variety of settings. Kumashiro was also the founding director of the Center for Anti-Oppressive Education, which closed in 2017.

== Biography ==
Kumashiro was deeply influenced by his mother, who was also a teacher who from a young age instilled her love of teaching into her children. He also gained influence from some of his high school teachers who he grew fond of. Kumashiro identifies himself as an Asian-American who reaches for racial harmony in the classroom. He seeks for educators to understand that oppressive education can go on in unnoticed ways. Kevin Kumashiro tries to get educators to question common sense. For instance, just because students score high on standardized tests may not mean that they are properly learning or being properly taught, despite common sense saying that high scores means higher learning. As Kevin Kumashiro states, "I’m trying to get people to question those things that we take for granted, because … maybe they are part of the problem".

Kumashiro received his Ph.D. in educational policy studies from the School of Education at the University of Wisconsin-Madison in 2000. In the same year, he published the influential article "Toward a Theory of Anti-Oppressive Education".

== Idea of Education ==
Kumashiro's idea of education and role of the teacher is to empower the student and be an anti-oppressive educator. The definition of anti-oppressive education according to the Center of Anti-Oppressive Education, founded by Kumashiro:

Anti-oppressive education is premised on the notion that many traditional and commonsense ways of engaging in "education" actually contribute to oppression in schools and society. Furthermore, anti-oppressive education is premised on the notion that many commonsense ways of "reforming education" actually mask the oppressions that need to be challenged. What results is a deep commitment to changing how we think about and engage in many aspects of education, from curriculum and pedagogy, to school culture and activities, to institutional structure and policies. Perhaps more importantly, what results is a deep commitment to exploring perspectives on education that do not conform to what has become "common sense" in the field of education. Anti-oppressive education expects to be different, perhaps uncomfortable, and even controversial.

Through the spread of Anti-Oppressive Education, Kumashiro wants to challenge all forms of oppression in classrooms, both intentional and unintentional.

== Kumashiro's Critical Analysis of Public Schooling ==
Kumashiro is a strong proponent for publicly funded education, and his advocacy stems from empowering minority groups such as LGBTQ, low SES, and students of color to have an equal opportunity to become well educated citizens. Kumashiro claims that many of the learning problems that come from public education arise from racial unawareness on the part of the educators. This discrimination can be unintentional as well as intentional. On top of that Kumashiro criticizes that public schools are perpetuating oppressive teaching practices by failing to acknowledge them. He believes that the best way to prevent oppression of minority groups is for educators and educational leaders to ask “How our practices contribute to oppression?” Alongside fellow educators, Kumashiro criticizes public leaders who develop public school curriculum for failing to realize their unintentional discriminative lessons. In his book, “Preparing Anti-Oppressive Teachers in 6 Disciplines”, Kevin Kumashiro dispels the notion that anti-oppressive teaching is limited to social studies such as politics and history.

== Bibliography ==
As of 2025, Kumashiro was the (co-)author of nine books on anti-oppressive education and activism, including

- Kumashiro, Kevin (2002). Troubling Education: "Queer" Activism and Anti-Oppressive Pedagogy. Taylor & Francis. ISBN 9781136745430. (recipient of the 2003 Gustavus Myers Outstanding Book Award)
- Kumashiro, Kevin K. (2024) [2004]. Against common sense: teaching and learning toward social justice (4th ed.). New York: Routledge. ISBN 978-1-040-02997-8.
- Kumashiro, Kevin K.; Ngo, Bic (2014) [2007]. Six Lenses for Anti-Oppressive Education: Partial Stories, Improbable Conversations (2nd ed.). Peter Lang. ISBN 9781453912980.
- Kumashiro, Kevin K. (2008). The seduction of common sense: how the right has framed the debate on America's schools. Teaching for social justice series. New York: Teachers College Press, Columbia Univ. ISBN 978-0-8077-4868-8.
- Kumashiro, Kevin K. (2024) [2009]. Against common sense: teaching and learning toward social justice (4th ed.). New York: Routledge. ISBN 978-1-040-02997-8.
- Kumashiro, Kevin K. (2015) [2012]. Bad Teacher! How Blaming Teachers Distorts the Bigger Picture. Teaching for Social Justice Series. New York: Teachers College Press. ISBN 978-0-8077-5321-7.
