= Paulo Freire: The Man from Recife =

Book by James D. Kirylo

- First edition cover
- Author: James D. Kirylo
- Language: English
- Genre: Academic
- Publisher: Peter Lang
- Publication date: 2011
- Publication place: United States
- Media type: Print (paperback)
- Pages: 359
- ISBN: 978-1-4331-0878-5

Paulo Freire: The Man from Recife is a 2011 biography of the Brazilian educator and philosopher Paulo Freire written by James D. Kirylo.

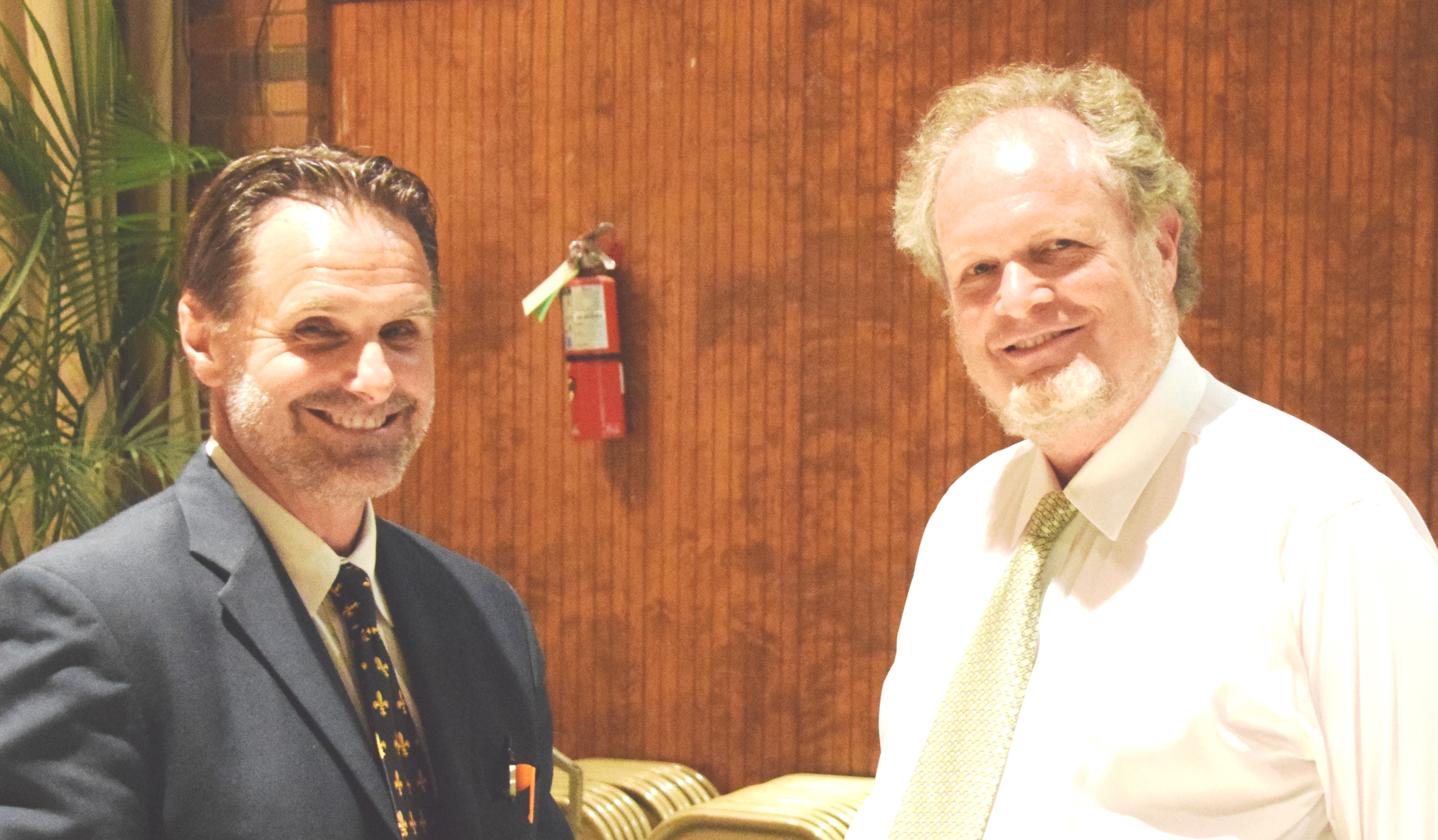
Author James D. Kirylo, president of Southeastern Louisiana University's Faculty Senate confers with Kevin L. Cope, president of the LSU Faculty Senate and president of the Association of Louisiana Faculty Senates, during a panel presentation in Hammond, on "State of (Dis)Repair: Higher Education in Louisiana" during 2015.

== Reviews ==
Donaldo Macedo, author of numerous books and one who collaborated with Freire, asserted that Kirylo's “insightful book is a great complement to Freire’s Letters to Cristina and Ana Maria Araújo Freire’s Paulo Freire: Uma História de Vida… Reading Kirylo’s book reminds me how I feel enormously to have an opportunity to work and collaborate with Paulo Freire so closely for many years.”

According to Peter McLaren, "Paulo Freire has cultivated the ground for a long revolution, and James D. Kirylo's outstanding new work has skillfully illuminated this in ways few books on Freire have managed to accomplish."
