= Who Will Tell My Brother? =

2002 young adult novel

- Author: Marlene Carvell
- Language: English
- Publication date: 2002

Who Will Tell My Brother? is a 2002 young adult novel by Marlene Carvell.

== Reception ==
The book was reviewed by School Library Journal and Radical Teacher.

== Award ==
The book won an International Reading Association award in 2003 in the Children's and Young Adult's Book category.
