= Phil Carspecken =

Phil Francis Carspecken is a professor of inquiry methodology at Indiana University in Bloomington, Indiana. He graduated from Aston University in 1987 with a Ph.D. in sociology, with specializations in social theory, social movements, urban sociology, cultural studies, ethnographic research, and educational sociology. He is also a graduate of the University of Wisconsin where he received a B.A. in Cultural Anthropology with minors in math and philosophy. Prior to his current appointment at Indiana University, Phil Carspecken was an associate professor at the University of Houston.

In his academic career, Carspecken works to relate the philosophy of critical theory from the Frankfurt School and the Theory of Communicative Action of Jürgen Habermas in particular, to educational research. The most widely distributed work in which Phil Carspecken does this is Critical Ethnography in Educational Research; A Theoretical and Practical Guide. This text is known in qualitative educational research and has been translated in several languages including Chinese. His most recent projects include an investigation into the limits of what can be known. This work will be published in the forthcoming book Can a Theory of Everything Explain Itself? Limits to knowledge in the physical and social sciences. At Indiana University, Carspecken has assisted in the development of the world’s first graduate program in inquiry methodology. This program integrates both qualitative and quantitative methodology tracks of study within one degree program. Carspecken has earned many awards for his teaching both at the University of Houston and Indiana University, where he has nurtured and positively impacted many generations of students.

== See also ==
- Critical ethnography
