= Richard Courtenay (disambiguation) =

Richard Courtenay was a prelate.

Richard Courtenay may also refer to:

- Richard Courtenay (MP) (died 1696)

== See also ==
- Richard Courtney (disambiguation)
