= Richard Courtney =

Drama teacher and theatre scholar (1927–1997)

Richard Courtney (4 June 1927 – 16 August 1997) was a drama teacher and theatre scholar focusing on children's drama.

== Life and education ==
He was born in Newmarket, England on June 4, 1927 and was educated at Culford School and the University of Leeds.

Between 1948 and 1952, Courtney studied at the University of Leeds with Shakespeare scholar G. Wilson Knight and Pirandello scholar and translator Frederick May. While there, he directed and appeared in several theatre productions and upon graduation worked with the Arts Theatre in Leeds and the Rep Theatre in Yorkshire.

On December 21, 1953, he married Rosemary Gale.

Courtney died on Salt Spring Island, British Columbia on August 16, 1997.

== Career ==
From 1956 to 1960, he played various roles on BBC radio. Between 1952 and 1959 he taught drama at schools in England, before becoming senior lecturer in drama at Trent Park College of Education in 1959, a position he retained until 1967. From 1968 to 1971, he was associate professor of theatre at the University of Victoria, British Columbia and was professor of drama from 1971 to 1974 at the University of Calgary. While in Calgary, Courtney also directed theatre and served as president of the Canadian Child and Youth Drama Association as well as being an advisor to the Minister of Culture, Andre Fortier.

In 1974, he was appointed professor of the Ontario Institute for Studies in Education and the University of Toronto Graduate Centre for Drama. At the latter, he worked with Peter McLaren, one of the leading theorists of critical pedagogy. He maintained these positions until his retirement in 1995.

In 1975, he traveled to New Mexico to research the dramatic rituals of the Hopi and the Navajo Nations. He visited the University of Melbourne in 1970 and 1974 and was a visiting fellow in the spring of 1979 at the Melbourne State College, Victoria.

Courtney wrote extensively on dramatic theory and has around one hundred published works. He was also responsible for numerous reports and journal articles on subjects such as educational drama, drama therapy, arts education, criticism, and the history of drama. Courtney has lectured in Australia, Canada, the United Kingdom, and the United States. He was president of the Canadian Conference of the Arts from 1973 to 1976 and chairman of the National Inquiry into Arts and Education in Canada from 1975 to 1979.

== Selected published works ==
- Courtney, Richard (1964). Drama for Youth. London, Sir Isaac Pitman & Sons. ASIN: B0000CM0ZV.
- Courtney, Richard (1968). Play, Drama and Thought. Simon & Pierre. 978-0889242135.
- Courtney, Richard (1966). The School Play. Cassell. B000L5PQS0.
- Courtney, Richard (1967). The Drama Studio. Pitman. OCLC: 229971.
- Courtney, Richard (1981). The Dramatic Curriculum. Heinemann Educational Publishers. 978-0435181819.
