= Khen Lampert =

Israeli educator and philosophern

- חן למפרט
- Born: 1957 (age 68–69); Tel Aviv, Israel
- Education: PhD in Philosophy and Comparative Study of Cultures from Tel Aviv University
- Occupations: Educator, Philosopher, Professor of Behavioral Sciences
- Known for: Theory of Radical Compassion, Social activism, Philosophy of education
- Notable work: Traditions of Compassion (2006); Empathic Education – A Critique of Neo-Capitalism (2008); A Language of Empathy (2022)

Khen Lampert is an Israeli educator and a philosopher, Professor of behavioral-sciences, who teaches Philosophy, History, Cultural Studies and Education. He has extensive experience working with children in underprivileged neighborhoods in Israel, both Jewish and Arab. Lampert is an important contributor to philosophy-of-culture and education. His work draws from a wide range of theoretical traditions extending from Karl Marx to Paulo Freire; from Buddhism to modern Christianity; from Herbert Marcuse to Heinz Kohut. He is an advocate of radical-non-violent social-activism vigorously opposing neoliberalism (which he terms as ‘neocapitalism’), militarism, fundamentalism, and the post-modern attacks against the Welfare state, the youth and the poor. Lampert's important work focuses on the ‘Theory of Radical Compassion’, a term he coined to describe the nature of an alternative socio-educational reality. According to Lampert, a conception of radical compassion, based on the imperative to change reality, is not only necessary, but possible, as radical compassion is rooted deep in our human nature and is not mediated by culture.

== Biography ==
Khen Lampert was born in Tel Aviv, after his parents left a kibbutz. After graduating from high school and military service, Lampert began working with at-risk children and teens. He has worked as an instructor, teacher, lecturer, counselor and director, in various frameworks straddling education and welfare. In 1999, Lampert has founded (along with his work-colleague Gady Avidan), a social-support-network for underprivileged children which attempts to create real change in the lives of children (Jewish and Arab), from exclusion to social inclusion, in various locations in Israel. The network is working to combat the plight of children through "generative mentoring", i.e., a unique model of creating change through an adult-child interaction. The generative-mentoring model relies on the social theory and epistemology proposed in Lampert's writings. Lampert completed his PhD in philosophy and comparative study of Cultures at Tel Aviv University in 1997. At present, he is a university and college Professor, and publishes academic books on critical pedagogy, comparative analysis of religion and ethics.

== Philosophy ==
Culture and philosophy: in his book Traditions of Compassion (Palgrave, 2006), Lampert offers an analysis of the concept of "compassion" in three cultures for which the term "compassion", is an inherent part of their self-image: Christian-Catholic culture, which developed a narrative of compassion in the sense of participation in agony (of Christ), complementary and contrasting the biblical narrative; Buddhist tradition, where compassion appears as a universal tendency to prevent suffering, and as a state of consciousness closely related to enlightenment; and the secular modern European tradition which demands social responsibility and state-welfare as a substitute to religious compassion. Lampert's analysis demonstrates how the ideological history of each of these traditions, teaches the distancing and restraining of compassion, to the point where it almost impossible to legitimize a compassionate action. The critical analysis indicates how each of these three traditions, not only did not fulfill its "promise of compassion" and its obligation for the welfare of the weak in society, but actually served as a basis for rejection and exclusion.

In light of these comparative analyzes, Lampert offers his "Theory of Radical-Compassion" – radical-compassion is an empathic state of consciousness that generates the imperative for the praxis of change and combat other's suffering. According to Lampert, Radical Compassion is a natural tendency of human organism, which has been historically oppressed by culture (as opposed to common cultural theories, e.g. the Freudian perception of natural tendencies as primarily selfish, and the understanding of empathy as a superimposition of culture).

Philosophy of education: in his book Empathic education – a critique of neo-capitalism (published in Hebrew 2008), Lampert extends his social criticism. He analyses the post-modern education system and argues that social exclusion, alienation and failure is an inherent part of a social reproduction ideology. The critical analysis reveals the gap between the smug self-image of those engaged in education, and the harsh and violent face of the system, of which teachers are victims as much as students. As an alternative, Lampert offers a return to the roots of educational practice; i.e. the human-encounter based on our natural empathy, especially in its radical form. This type of resistance, means a radical change in school, that like other cultural institutions, is built to keep us all away from authentic human encounter.

Philosophy of Emotions: In his book A Language of Empathy (Tel Aviv University Press 2022), Lampert offers a comprehensive philosophical and historical analysis of the concept of empathy in its various theoretical manifestations. Lampert's analysis expands the classical phenomenological position, that identifies empathy with a direct perception of the mental states of others and adds to it caring as a necessary identifier. According to Lampert, the requirement for conceptualization that subordinates our perceptions to language and culture, "subverts" and weakens our ability to sense others, but at the same time allows for the formulation of an moral position, which Lampert identifies with the Ethics of care.

== Books ==
Lampert is the author of:

- Care-Pedagogy and Limits of Ai in Education, Palgrave/Springer, 2026, ISBN 978-3-032-40996-6
- A Language of Empathy, Tel Aviv University Press (2022)
- Meritocratic Education and Social Worthlessness, Springer(2012);
- Traditions of Compassion: From Religious Duty to Social Activism, Palgrave - Macmillan (2005);
- Compassionate Education: Prolegomena for Radical Schooling, Rowman & Littlefield (2003);
- Empathic Education - A Critique of Neocapitalism, Resling (2008 in Hebrew);
- A voice Unheard: A different Insight on Children Distress (2005 in Hebrew), co-authored with Gadi Avidan and Gish Amit

== See also ==
- Compassion
- Critical pedagogy
- Teaching for social justice
