= John Asimakopoulos =

American sociologist & author (born 1970)

- Born: September 10, 1970 (age 56)
- Occupations: Sociologist, author

Academic background
- Education: Rutgers University (BA, MA, MA); CUNY Graduate Center (PhD)
- Thesis: Comparative Analysis of European and American Working Class Attainments (2000)
- Doctoral advisor: Paul Attewell

Academic work
- Discipline: Sociology
- Sub-discipline: Social theory, critical pedagogy, industrial relations, international political economy, higher education
- Institutions: Bronx Community College of the City University of New York

John Asimakopoulos (born September 10, 1970) is an American sociologist and author. He is a professor of sociology at the Bronx Community College of the City University of New York. Asimakopoulos co-founded the Transformative Studies Institute.

== Early life and education ==
Asimakopoulos attended high school in Athens, Greece. He returned to the United States and received a bachelor's degree in sociology and economics from Rutgers University in 1992. He remained at Rutgers for his master's degrees, receiving an MA in economics in 1993 and an MA in political science in 1994. He went on for a PhD in the sociology program at the CUNY Graduate Center, which he completed in 2000. His doctoral advisor was Paul Attewell, and his thesis title was Comparative Analysis of European and American Working Class Attainments.

== Career ==
After teaching as an adjunct professor at New Jersey and New York area universities, in 2004 he began as an assistant professor of social sciences at the Bronx Community College. He came to public attention in 2006, when the City University of New York refused to renew his contract on the grounds of "lack of collegiality". Asimakopoulos alleged this was a political firing because of his outspoken libertarian socialist ideology. Asimakopoulos filed for arbitration, which he won in 2008, and returned to his position. Asimakopoulos describes himself as a "Scholar-Activist" and "Organic Intellectual".

== Transformative Studies Institute ==
In 2007, Asimakopoulos co-founded the Transformative Studies Institute (TSI) together with Ali Shehzad Zaidi. Both Asimakopoulos and Zaidi were at the time facing non-renewal of their contracts from Bronx Community College (Asimakopoulos later was reinstated under arbitration). Asimakopoulos has said that he founded TSI as a reaction to this experience. Asimakopoulos serves as executive director of this section 501(c)(3) nonprofit organization.

TSI publishes the interdisciplinary journal Theory in Action, founded by Asimakopoulos in 2008. It also publishes the Journal of Social Justice, founded in 2011. Asimakopoulos is editor-in-chief of both journals. There is a TSI YouTube channel which hosts the video series "Crushing Capitalism with Dr. Asimakopoulos". TSI states that its mission is to found an interdisciplinary graduate school focused on social problems and social justice.

== Books ==
- Asimakopoulos, John. (2011). Revolt! The Next Great Transformation from Kleptocracy Capitalism to Libertarian Socialism through Counter Ideology, Societal Education, & Direct Action
- Shannon, Deric, Nocella, Anthony J. and Asimakopoulos, John. (Eds.). (2012). The Accumulation of Freedom: Writings on Anarchist Economics
- Asimakopoulos, John. (Reprint edition, 2016). Social Structures of Direct Democracy: On the Political Economy of Equality
- Asimakopoulos, John and Richard Gilman-Opalsky (Eds.). 2018. Against Capital in the Twenty-First Century: A Reader of Radical Undercurrents
- Asimakopoulos, John. 2019. The Political Economy of the Spectacle and Postmodern Caste (Studies in Critical Social Sciences)
