= Critical ethnography =

Ethnography approach based on critical theory

Critical ethnography is an approach to ethnography based on critical theory. It focuses on the implicit values expressed within ethnographic studies and, therefore, on the unacknowledged biases that may result from such implicit values. It has been called critical theory in practice. In the spirit of critical theory, this approach seeks to determine symbolic mechanisms, to extract ideology from action, and to understand the cognition and behaviour of research subjects within historical, cultural, and social frameworks.

Critical ethnography incorporates reflexive inquiry into its methodology. Researchers employing this approach position themselves as being intrinsically linked to those being studied and thus inseparable from their context. In addition to speaking on behalf of subjects, critical ethnographers will also attempt to recognize and articulate their own perspective as a means of acknowledging the biases that their own limitations, histories, and institutional standpoints bear on their work. Further, critical ethnography is inherently political as well as pedagogical in its approach. There is no attempt to be purely detached and scientifically objective in reporting and analysis. In contrast to conventional ethnography which describes what is, critical ethnography also asks what could be in order to disrupt tacit power relationships and perceived social inequalities.

== History ==
Critical ethnography stems from both anthropology and the Chicago school of sociology. Following the movements for civil rights of the 1960s and 1970s some ethnographers became more politically active and experimented in various ways to incorporate emancipatory political projects into their research. For example, some ethnographers with political agendas for change chose to conduct fieldwork in unconventional environments such as modern workplaces that were not necessarily considered exotic, as previous anthropologists had typically done. Other ethnographers consciously attempted to conduct research on so-called deviant or suppressed groups from outside the paradigm of hegemonic cultural positionings to provide new avenues for dissent and dialogue on societal transformation.

== Critical Ethnographic Respect ==
‘Critical ethnographic respect’ is proposed by Appleton as a way to talk about how we can approach our ethnographic data and conversations - with respect for the narratives of interlocutors, without abdicating critical analysis of the spaces and materialities from wherein these narratives emerge. The concept draws on and builds on the term ‘critical respect’ as articulated by Rosalind C. Gill, which “involves attentive, respectful listening, to be sure, but it does not abdicate the right to question or interrogate”. For Gill, respectful listening is the start of the work of feminist scholars, when we layer the context alongside the narratives of women's lives and experiences. Appleton writes, "Listening respectfully and then creating space for those narratives to be heard alongside a nuanced structural analysis, is the work done by critical ethnographic respect."

== Notable contributors to critical ethnography ==
- Phil Carspecken
- D. Soyini Madison
- Geoffrey Walford

== See also ==
- Anthropology
- Chicago School (sociology)
- Ethnomethodology
- Qualitative research
- Sociology
