= Jean Anyon =

American educationist (1941–2013)

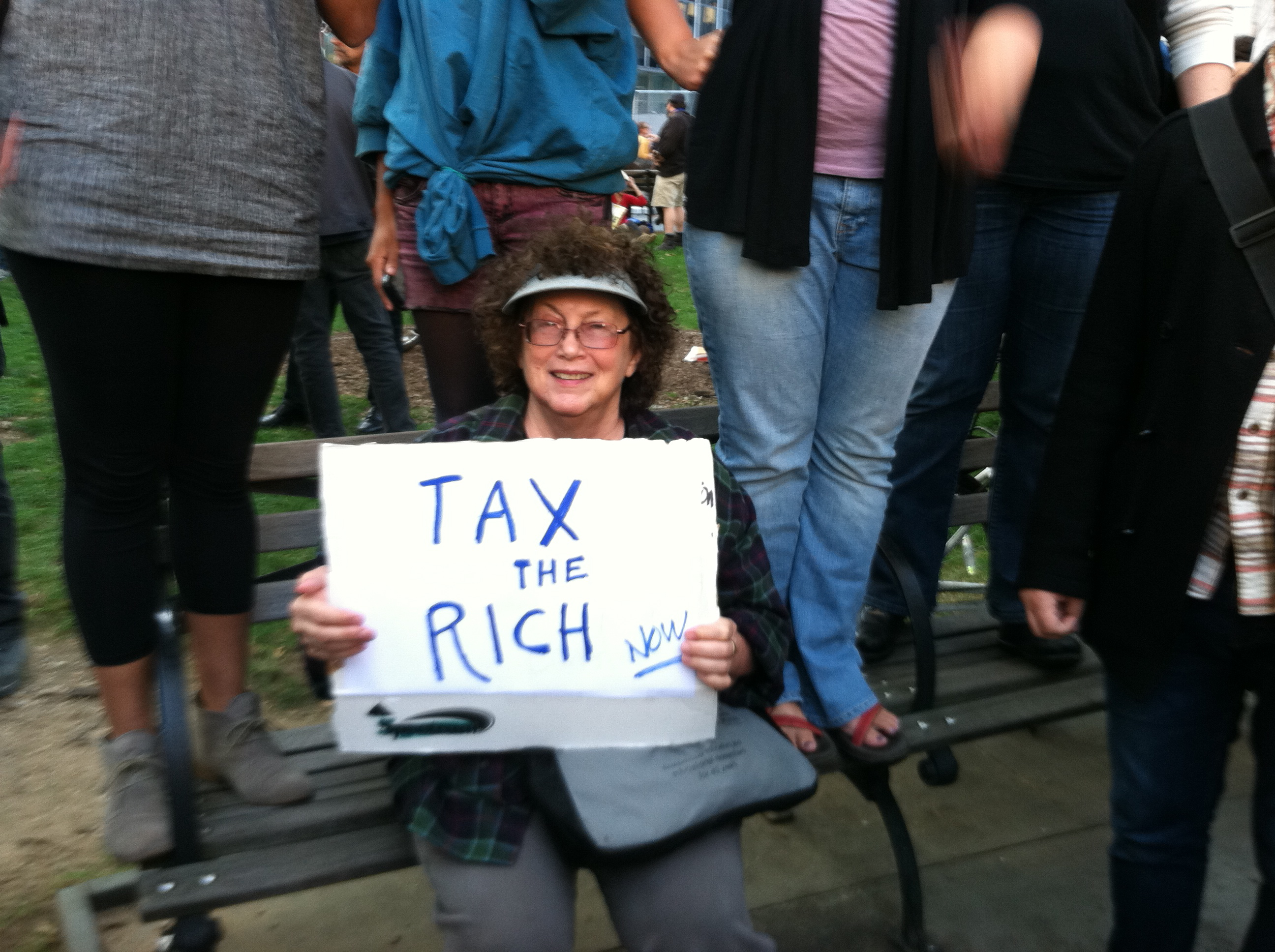
- Dr. Jean Anyon in 2011 at Occupy Wall Street; image by Dr. Noah Asher Golden
- Born: July 16, 1941; Jersey City, New Jersey
- Died: September 7, 2013 (aged 72); Manhattan

Jean Anyon (July 16, 1941 – September 7, 2013), was an American critical theorist and researcher in education, a professor in the Doctoral Program in Urban Education at The Graduate Center of The City University of New York, and a civil rights and social activist.

== Biography ==
Anyon was born on July 16, 1941, in Jersey City, New Jersey. She attended the University of Pennsylvania (1963), earning a bachelor's and a master's degrees in education, and completed her doctoral work at New York University (1976). She spent much of her early career at Rutgers University in Newark, New Jersey, and in 2002 joined the faculty at The Graduate Center of The City University of New York, where she mentored students and taught courses in social and educational policy and critical social theory. She was the recipient of the American Educational Research Association (AERA) Division G (Social Contexts of Education) Lifetime Achievement Award (2010 )and was named an AERA Research Fellow the same year.

== Scholarship ==
Anyon's work examines the intersections of race, social class, education policy, and the economy. In the 1970s and early 1980s, she, along with others, laid the foundation for the field of critical educational studies. Her early articles on social reproduction, social class and the hidden curriculum and her now classic 1997 book, Ghetto Schooling: A Political Economy of Urban Educational Reform, were groundbreaking and changed the way a generation of educational scholars viewed the relationship between urban schools and communities. Her later work made important contributions to social and educational theory and provided a powerful illustration of the need to connect urban school reform to social and economic policy and grassroots, community-based movements.

Anyon is renowned for her creative use of historical political economy as a method of analysis. In much of her work, she combines political economy and social theory with qualitative methods, such as direct observation and interviewing, making her work uniquely rich.

In 1980, Anyon published her seminal article, "Social Class and the Hidden Curriculum of Work". In 1981, she followed up with another foundational contribution: "Social Class and School Knowledge". These are among the most widely cited articles in education and among the first to animate the processes of social reproduction through empirical work in the United States.

"Social Class and the Hidden Curriculum," which has been reprinted more than thirty times, offers numerous illustrative examples of how the hidden curriculum of work embedded in classroom processes serves to reproduce the social class structure. "Social Class and School Knowledge" hones in on disparities in curricular content and textbooks across five schools representing a range of social classes—from elite to low-income. This early work also provided empirical evidence of schools' potential for promoting social change.

Anyon's first book, Ghetto Schooling: A Political Economy of Urban Educational Reform (1997) was groundbreaking for linking a historical political economic analysis to the process of urban school reform. Sociologist William Julius Williams contends in the book's foreword that Anyon makes clear that "to be successful, educational reforms in urban schools have to be part of a larger effort to address the problems of poverty and racial isolation in our inner cities."

In Radical Possibilities: Public Policy, Urban Education, and a New Social Movement (2005), Anyon details the various public policies that impact education including housing, public transportation, and maldistributive taxation. Additionally, Anyon offers critical analysis of federal, state and local policies, which much educational research fails to fully acknowledge, explicate or interrogate.

Radical Possibilities also takes on the task of exploring how we might build a new broad-based, multiracial social movement with education at the center. Inspired by early civil rights activism (1900–1950), Anyon used social movement theory to explore how people at that time became involved in political contention, and how we might be guided by their example to foment a new movement, suited for social struggle in our own times. Here, she is, at least in part, responding to scholars who deemed her earlier work overly deterministic or economistic. Anyon remained hopeful of the possibility of a counterinsurgency against socially reproductive forces. As such, Anyon offers a call to action, demanding that we translate critical analysis into critical action.

As Peter McLaren notes, "Radical Possibilities is a critical pedagogy for activating policy reform at the grassroots—something vitally needed at this time in history."

Anyon's recent work has involved a number of collaborations with her doctoral students in the Ph.D. Program in Urban Education at The Graduate Center. The principle example of this is the 2009 text, Theory and Educational Research: Toward Critical Social Explanation. Here, Anyon reflects on her own personal journey through and with theory, from her early engagement with Marx to more recent encounters with theorists as diverse as Judith Butler, Arjun Appadurai and Chantal Mouffe. The volume then features the work of her students who reflect on their own uses of theory and extend Anyon's analyses into a broad range of research areas.

Ultimately, Theory and Educational Research reveals, as David Berliner states, "that even though theoretical labor is challenging, it can also be exhilarating for the researcher, demanding personal creativity while building one's critical intellectual power."

In her 2005 Harvard Educational Review article, titled "What ‘Counts’ as Educational Policy?" Anyon offers what she calls "notes toward a new paradigm" for educational policy analysis and activism. This is perhaps the clearest articulation and summation of Anyon's intellectual contribution, and more, the passionate political commitments of her life. We need a new paradigm, Anyon insists, "one that promotes equity-seeking school change and that includes strategies to create conditions that will allow the educational improvements to take root, grow, and bear fruit in students' lives."

Another of Anyon's notable works is her 2011 book, Marx and Education, in which she offers an introduction to the Marxian tradition in education scholarship, and encourages a new generation of scholars to re-engage Marxian ideas as a way to more powerfully explain and respond to persistent class and race inequities in public education.

== Mentorship ==
Besides her seminal contributions to education and social policy, Anyon was widely known as an outstanding and supportive mentor. During her tenure in the Urban Education Doctoral Program at the CUNY Graduate Center, she chaired over a dozen dissertations and sat on numerous dissertation committees. Anyon continued to work with doctoral students until the time of her death on September 7, 2013, at her home in Manhattan, where she died of cancer. A revised version of Radical Possibilities is due to come out in early 2014. She was a professor of social and educational policy at the CUNY Graduate Center until her death in 2013.

== Works ==
- "Social Class and the Hidden Curriculum of Work", Journal of Education, Vol. 162, no. 1, Fall 1980.
- Social Class and School Knowledge (Curriculum Inquiry, 1981)
- Ghetto Schooling: A Political Economy of Urban Education (Teachers College Press, 1997)
- Radical Possibilities: Public Policy, Urban Education, and a New Social Movement (Routledge 2005)
- Theory and Educational Research: Toward Critical Social Explanation(Routledge 2009).
