= Pedagogy of the Oppressed =

Book by Paulo Freire

- Spanish edition, 1968
- Author: Paulo Freire
- Original title: Pedagogia do Oprimido
- Translator: Myra Ramos
- Language: Portuguese
- Subject: Pedagogy
- Publication date: 1968
- Publication place: Brazil
- ISBN: 978-0-8264-1276-8
- Dewey Decimal: 370.115
- LC Class: LB880 .F73

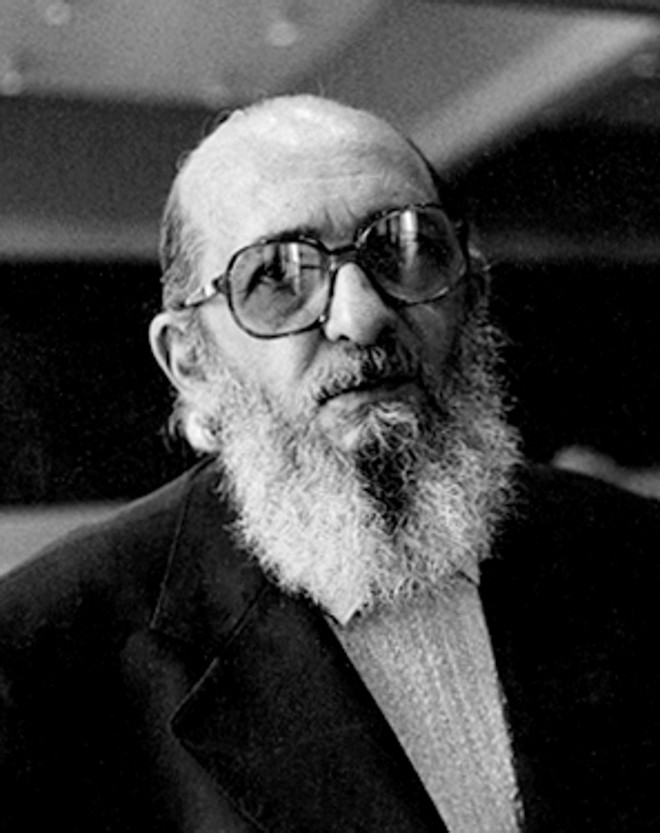
Paulo Freire, the author of Pedagogy of the Oppressed

Pedagogy of the Oppressed (Portuguese: Pedagogia do Oprimido) is a book by Brazilian Marxist educator Paulo Freire, written in Portuguese between 1967 and 1968, but first published in Spanish in 1968. The book is considered one of the foundational texts of critical pedagogy, and proposes a pedagogy with a new relationship between teacher, student, and society.

Dedicated to the oppressed and based on his experience helping Brazilian adults to read and write, Freire includes a detailed Marxist class analysis in his exploration of the relationship between the colonizer and the colonized. In the book, Freire calls traditional pedagogy the "banking model of education" because it treats the student as an empty vessel to be filled with knowledge, like a piggy bank. He argues that pedagogy should instead treat the learner as a co-creator of knowledge.

An English translation was published in 1970, with the Portuguese original being published in 1972 in Portugal, and then again in Brazil in 1974. As of 2000, the book had sold over 750,000 copies worldwide. It is the third most cited book in social science.

== Background and publication ==
Due to the 1964 Brazilian coup d'état, where a military dictatorship was put in place with the support of the United States, Paulo Freire was exiled from his home country, an exile that lasted 16 years. After a brief stay in Bolivia, he moved to Chile in November 1964 and stayed until April 1969 when he accepted a temporary position at Harvard University. His four-and-a-half year stay in Chile impacted him intellectually, pedagogically, and ideologically, and contributed significantly to the theory and analysis he presents in Pedagogy of the Oppressed. In Freire's own words:

When I wrote [Pedagogy of the Oppressed] I was already completely convinced of the problem of social classes. In addition, I wrote this book based on my extensive experience with peasants in Chile, and I was absolutely convinced of the process of ideological hegemony and what that meant. When I heard the peasants speak, I experienced the whole problem of the mechanism of domination (which I analyse in the first chapter of the book)...Certainly, in my earliest writings I did not make this explicit, because I did not perceive it yet as such...[Pedagogy of the Oppressed] is also completely situated in a historical reality.

Freire wrote Pedagogy of the Oppressed between 1967 and 1968, while living in the United States. Originally written in his native Portuguese, Pedagogy of the Oppressed was first published in Spanish in 1968. This was followed by an English version, in a translation by Myra Bergman Ramos, in 1970. The Portuguese original was released in Portugal in 1972 and in Brazil in 1974. Though Ramos' translation has received some degree of criticism, Freire approved of it and was involved in consultation during the translating process.

== Influences ==
The work was strongly influenced by Karl Marx and Frantz Fanon. As one critic, John D. Holst, describes it:

In Pedagogy of the Oppressed, Freire expresses a maturing Marxist-influenced analysis of the political nature of education that clearly places literacy and critical education within the context of the struggle of the oppressed to go beyond capitalist modernization and toward a revolutionary transformation.

== Synopsis ==
Pedagogy of the Oppressed has four chapters and a preface. The front matter includes an epigraph that reads "To the oppressed, and to those who suffer with them and fight at their side".

In the preface, Freire provides a background to his work and outlines potential opposition to his ideas. He explains that his thinking originated in his experience as a teacher, both in Brazil and during his time in political exile. During this time, he noticed that his students had an unconscious fear of freedom, or rather: a fear of changing the way the world is. Freire then outlines the likely criticisms he believes his book will face.

Freire's intended audience is radicals—people who see the world as changing and fluid—and he admits that his argument will most likely be missing necessary elements to construct pedagogies in given material realities. Basing his method of finding freedom on the poor and middle class's experience with education, Freire states that his ideas are rooted in reality—not purely theoretical.

In the first chapter, Freire outlines why he believes an emancipatory pedagogy is necessary. Describing humankind's central problem as affirming one's identity as human, Freire states that everyone strives for this, but oppression prevents many people from reaching this state of affirmation. This is termed dehumanization. Dehumanization, when individuals become objectified, occurs due to injustice, exploitation, and oppression. Pedagogy of the Oppressed is Freire's attempt to help the oppressed fight back, regain their lost humanity and achieve full humanization. Freire outlines steps with which the oppressed can regain their humanity, starting with acquiring knowledge about the concept of humanization itself.

Freire claims that it is easy for the oppressed to fight their oppressors, becoming oppressors and restarting the cycle of oppression. Additionally, he claims that to be fully human again, the oppressors must be identified and work to seek liberation, with the next step following an understanding of the oppressors' goals.

He also claims that oppressors are purely materialistic. They see humans as objects and by suppressing individuals, they can own these humans. While they may not be consciously putting down the oppressed, they value ownership over humanity, essentially dehumanizing themselves. This is important to realize, as the goal of the oppressed is to not only gain power. It is to allow all individuals to become fully human so that no oppression can exist.

Freire states that once the oppressed understand their oppression and discover their oppressors, the next step is dialogue, or discussion with others to reach the goal of humanization. Freire also highlights other events on this journey that the oppressed must undertake. There are many situations that the oppressed must be wary of. For example, they must be aware of the oppressors trying to help the oppressed. These people are deemed falsely generous, and to help the oppressed, one must first fully become the oppressed, mentally and environmentally. Only the oppressed can allow humanity to become fully human with no instances of objectification.

In chapter 2, Freire outlines his theories of education. The first discussed is the banking model of education. He believes the prevailing mode of education is narrative. There is one individual reciting facts and ideas (the teacher) and others who just listen and memorize everything (the students). There is no connection with their real life, resulting in a very passive learning style.

This form of education is termed the banking model of education. The banking model is very closely linked with oppression. It is built on the fact that the teacher knows all, and there exist inferiors who must just accept what they are told. They are not allowed to question the world or their teachers. This lack of freedom highlights the comparisons between the banking model of education and oppression. Freire urges the dismissal of the banking model of education, and the adoption of the problem-posing model. This new model encourages a discussion between teacher and student. It blurs the line between the two as everyone learns alongside each other, creating equality and the lack of oppression. There are many ways the banking model of education aligns with oppression. Essentially, it dehumanizes the student.

If they are raised to learn to be blank slates molded by the teacher, they will never be able to question the world if they need to. This form of education encourages them to just accept what is thrust upon them and accept that as correct. It makes the first step of humanization difficult. If they are trained to be passive listeners, they will never be able to realize that there even exist oppressors.

Chapter 3 is used to expand on Freire's idea of dialogue. He first explains the importance of words, and that they must reflect both action and reflection. Dialogue is an understanding between different people, and it is an act of love, humility, and faith. It provides others with the complete independence to experience the world and name it how they see it. Freire explains that educators shape how students see the world and history. They must use language with the point of view of the students in mind. They must allow "thematic investigation": the discovery of different relevant problems (limit situations) and ideas for different periods.

This ability is the difference between animals and humans. Animals are stuck in the present, unlike humans who understand history and use it to shape the present. Freire explains that the oppressed usually are not able to see the problems of their own time, and oppressors feed on this ignorance. Freire stresses the importance of educators not becoming oppressors and not objectifying their students. Educators and students must work as a team to find the problems of history and the present.

Freire lays out the process of how the oppressed can truly liberate themselves in chapter 4. He explains the methods used by oppressors to suppress humanity and the actions the oppressed can take to liberate humanity. The tools the oppressors use are termed "anti-dialogical actions". The ways the oppressed can overcome them are "dialogical actions". The four anti-dialogical actions include conquest, manipulation, divide and rule, and cultural invasion. The four dialogical actions are unity, compassion, organization, and cultural synthesis.

== Reception ==
Upon its release, Pedagogy of the Oppressed had an immediate impact on the field of educational studies in the United States. In 1971 it was already described as "a small classic of pedagogical theory", and awarded a "high status" in academic circles. In some countries under military dictatorships the book was both burned and banned, and Freire was forbidden to travel to several countries in Latin America and Africa after his ideas were taken up by radical revolutionary groups.

Shortly after its release, Edgar Z. Friedenberg wrote that the book's weaknesses were its "pedantic style, the consistent underestimate of the opposition and the very peculiar avoidance of Freire's own extensive experience as a source of illustrative material". Friedenberg said that a positive aspect of the book was Freire's recognition that formal education in the Brazilian setting is "counter-revolutionary and oppressive".

In his 1989 book Life in Schools, Peter McLaren emphasized that the teacher's politics are foundational to the pedagogy articulated in Freire's book. Building on McLaren, others said that the fourth chapter is the lynchpin holding the project together, and that the emphasis on the first two chapters severs Freire's method from his ideology and his politics from his pedagogy. The reasons for its neglect stem from the chapter's explicit concern with the revolutionary party and leadership, which Derek R. Ford argued flows from the Leninist conception of the party. Tyson Lewis similarly said that "Freire himself clearly saw his pedagogy as a tool to be used within revolutionary organization to mediate the various relationships between the oppressed and the leaders of resistance."

Freire was criticized by feminists for his use of sexist language in Pedagogy of the Oppressed, and it was revised for the 1995 edition to avoid sexism. Freire's later writings reflect the impact of this criticism, and use more inclusive language.

Freire's work was one inspiration for Augusto Boal's Theatre of the Oppressed.

In his introduction to the 30th anniversary edition of Pedagogy of the Oppressed, Donaldo Macedo, a former colleague of Freire and University of Massachusetts Boston professor, called the book a revolutionary text, and said that people in totalitarian states risk punishment for reading it. During the apartheid period in South Africa, the book was banned. Clandestine copies of the book were distributed underground as part of the "ideological weaponry" of various revolutionary groups like the Black Consciousness Movement.

In 2006, Pedagogy of the Oppressed came under criticism over its use by the Mexican American Studies Department Program at Tucson High School. In 2010, the Arizona State Legislature passed House Bill 2281, enabling the Arizona Superintendent of Public Instruction to restrict state funding to public schools with ethnic studies programs, effectively banning the programs. Tom Horne, who was Arizona Superintendent of Public Instruction at the time, criticized the programs for "teaching students that they are oppressed". The book was among seven titles officially confiscated from Mexican American studies classrooms, sometimes in front of students, by the Tucson Unified School District after the passing of HB 2281.

In a 2009 article for the conservative City Journal, Sol Stern wrote that Pedagogy of the Oppressed ignores the traditional touchstones of Western education (e.g. Jean-Jacques Rousseau, John Dewey, or Maria Montessori) and contains virtually none of the information typically found in traditional teacher education (e.g., no discussion of curriculum, testing, or age-appropriate learning). On the contrary, Freire rejects traditional education as "official knowledge" that intends to oppress. Stern also wrote in 2006 that heirs to Freire's ideas have taken them to mean that since all education is political: "leftist math teachers who care about the oppressed have a right, indeed a duty, to use a pedagogy that, in Freire's words, 'does not conceal—in fact, which proclaims—its own political character'".

A 2019 article in British internet magazine Spiked said that "In 2016, the Open Syllabus Project catalogued the 100 most requested titles on its service by English-speaking universities: the only Brazilian on its list was Freire's Pedagogy of the Oppressed."

== See also ==
- Adult education
- Adult literacy
- Critical consciousness
- Information deficit model
- Theatre pedagogy
