= Ira Shor =

American philosopher and academic

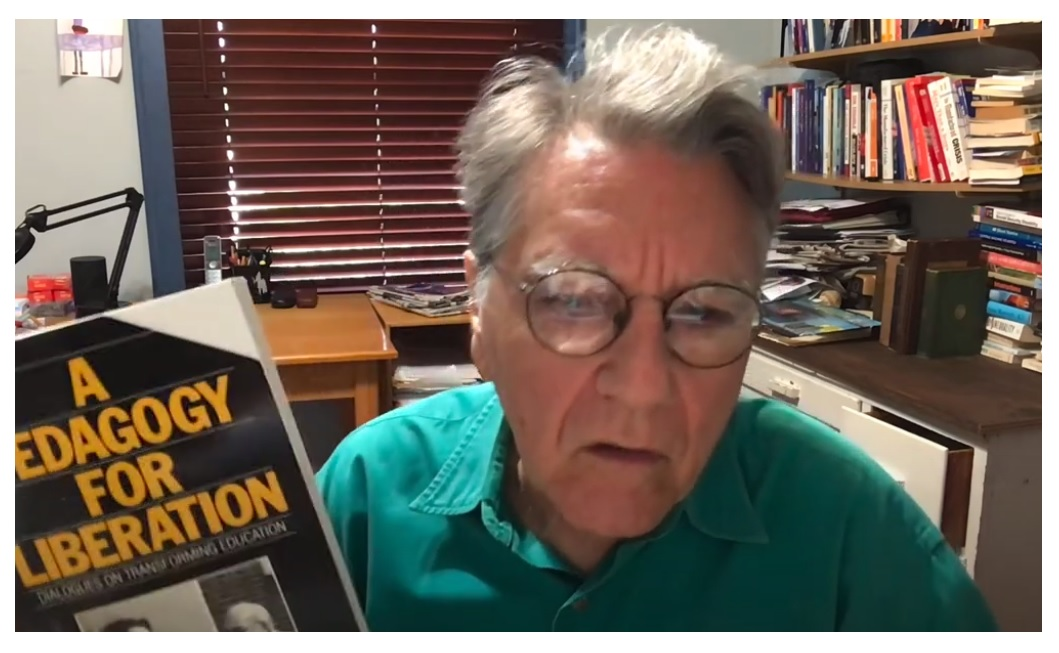
- conference call, 2021
- Born: June 2, 1945 (age 81); South Bronx, New York, USA
- Children: Paulo Shor

Philosophical work
- Era: 20th-century philosophy
- Region: Western Philosophy
- School: Critical pedagogy

Ira Shor (born June 2, 1945) is a professor at the College of Staten Island, City University of New York, where he teaches composition and rhetoric. He is also doctoral faculty in the PhD Program in English at The Graduate Center, CUNY.

== Biography ==
Shor grew up in the working class area in the South Bronx of New York City. Shor has stated that coming from a working-class area had a powerful influence on his thinking, politics and feelings. In collaboration with Paulo Freire, he was an exponentcritical pedagogy. Together they co-wrote A Pedagogy for Liberation.

== Personal life ==
Shor has one son, Paulo Shor, whom he named after his main influence Paulo Freire.

== Works ==
- Critical Teaching and Everyday Life (1980)
- Culture Wars: School and Society in the Conservative Restoration (1986)
- A Pedagogy for Liberation, with Paulo Freire (1987)
- Freire for the Classroom: A Sourcebook for Liberatory Teaching (1987)
- Empowering Education (1992)
- When Students have Power: Negotiating Authority in a Critical Pedagogy (1996)
- Critical Literacy in Action (1999)
- Education is Politics (1999)
