= Radical Teacher =

- Discipline: Pedagogy
- Language: English

Publication details
- History: 1975–present
- Publisher: University Library System, University of Pittsburgh, on behalf of Center for Critical Education, Inc.
- Frequency: Triannual
- Open access: Yes
- License: Creative Commons Attribution-NonCommercial-NoDerivatives

Standard abbreviations
- ISO 4: Radic. Teach.

Indexing
- ISSN: 0191-4847 (print); 1941-0832 (web)
- LCCN: 79642767
- JSTOR: 01914847
- OCLC no.: 50255711

Links
- Journal homepage

Radical Teacher is a socialist, feminist, and anti-racist peer-reviewed academic journal dedicated to the theory and practice of education. The journal examines the root causes of inequality and promotes progressive social change in the field of education. It serves the community of educators at all levels of education who are working for democratic process, peace and justice.

== History and Profile ==
Radical Teacher was founded in 1975. It arose out of the anti-war and other social justice movements of the late 1960s and early 1970s. Among its founders were Ellen Cantarow, Reamy Jansen, Louis Kampf, Paul Lauter, Richard Ohmann, and Susan O'Malley.

Radical Teacher is published to the public three times per year by the University Library System at the University of Pittsburgh. The academic journal publishes articles of interest to radical educators at all levels of education. It reports on pedagogy and curriculum, as well as on educational issues related to gender and sexuality, globalization, race, disability and similar topics. The journal attempts to examine the root causes of inequality and promotes the idea that educators should also be activists who work for progressive social change. Articles are rigorously reviewed by dozens of individuals with a background in education from across the United States.

Each issue of the magazine has a theme to which most of the articles relate. Themes that have been covered in the past include "Teaching in a Time of War", "Teaching Black Lives Matter", "Race in the Classroom", and "Beyond Identity Politics". In addition to articles, Radical Teacher also includes reviews and teaching notes.

Subscription to this academic journal is free.

== See also ==
- Critical pedagogy
