= Donaldo Macedo =

Cape Verdean-American critical theorist and linguist

Donaldo Pereira Macedo (born 1950) is a Cape Verdean-American critical theorist, linguist, and expert on literacy, critical pedagogy and multicultural education studies. Until 2019 he was Distinguished Professor of Liberal Arts and Education at the University of Massachusetts Boston. He was also the founder of the Master of Arts Program in Applied Linguistics at the University of Massachusetts Boston, and chaired the program until approximately 2012.

He has published extensively in the areas of linguistics, critical literacy, and bilingual and multicultural education. His work in translating and editing works of Paulo Freire, his published dialogues with Freire, and his own research on Freire's pedagogy, have significantly contributed to the field of critical pedagogy. Macedo co-authored two books with Freire, Literacy: Reading the Word and the World (1987) and Ideology Matters (2002). His other publications include: Literacies of Power: What Americans Are Not Allowed to Know (1994), Dancing With Bigotry (with Lilia Bartolome, 1991), and Critical Education in the New Information Age (with Manuel Castells, Ramón Flecha, Paulo Freire, Henry Giroux and Paul Willis, 1999). He also served as the editor for and contributed an introduction to Noam Chomsky's Chomsky on Miseducation (2000).

== Biography ==
Macedo was born on the island of Brava in the Cape Verde islands, off the coast of northwest Africa. He attended middle and high school on the island of São Vicente. He has six siblings, including a brother, Viriato (today known as Vinny deMacedo), who is 15 years younger. In 1966, the family immigrated to the United States, and settled in the Dorchester neighborhood of Boston, Massachusetts; three years later, Macedo's parents moved his siblings to the nearby coastal town of Kingston, while he remained in Dorchester with his grandmother to finish his studies at English High School.

He earned a BA at the University of Massachusetts Boston, and a master's degree in Spanish literature at New York University. In 1989 he completed a PhD in applied linguistics at Boston University, with a dissertation on Cape Verdean Creole.
