= Peter McLaren =

Canadian scholar (born 1948)

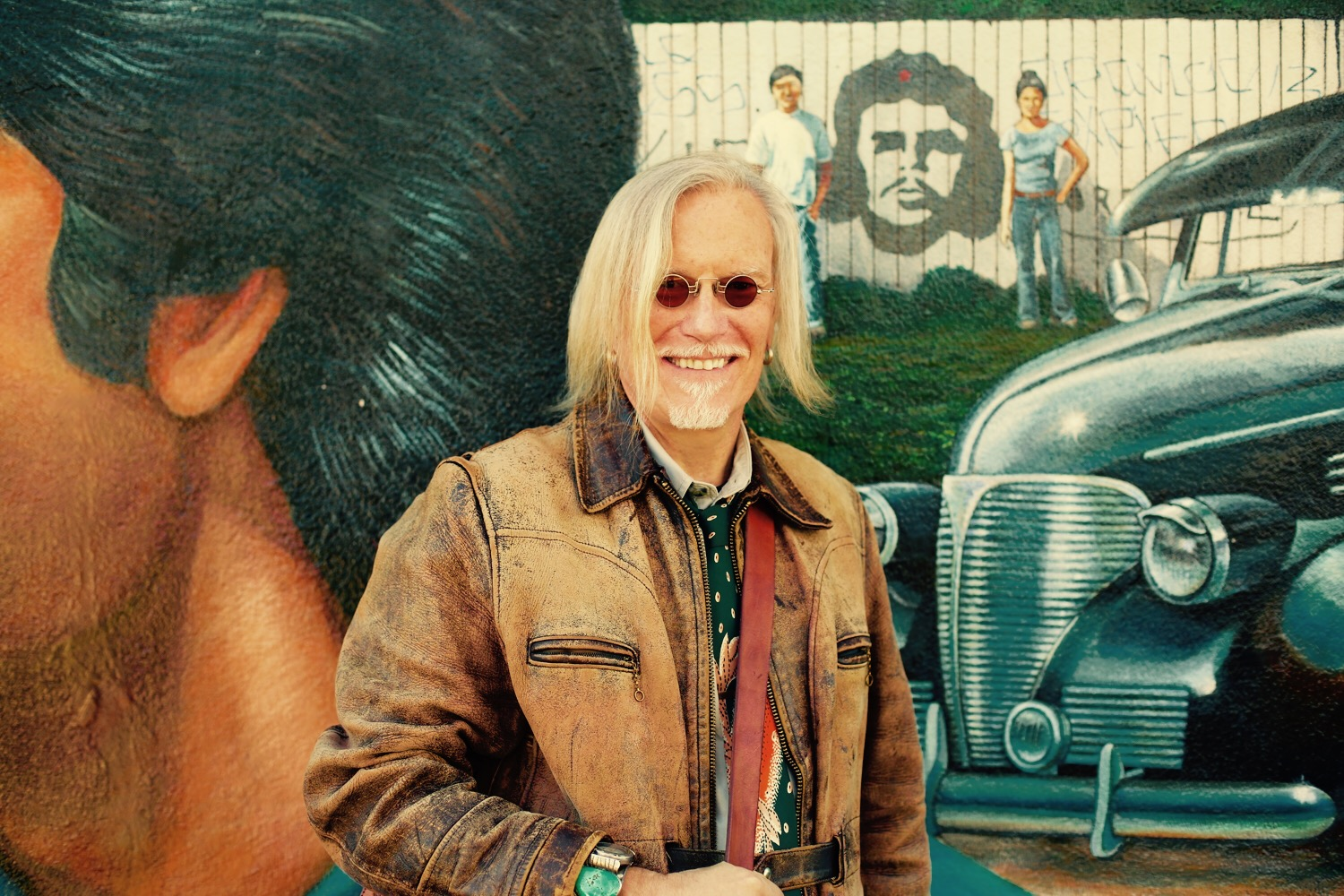
- McLaren in 2015
- Born: 2 August 1948 (age 78); Toronto, Ontario, Canada
- Spouse: Yan Wang

Academic background
- Education: University of Waterloo; University of Toronto; Brock University
- Thesis: Education as Ritual Performance (1984)
- Doctoral advisor: Richard Courtney
- Influences: Paulo Freire; Henry Giroux; Emmanuel Levinas; Karl Marx; Paul Ricœur

Academic work
- Discipline: Pedagogy
- School or tradition: Critical pedagogy; Marxist humanism
- Institutions: Miami University; University of California, Los Angeles; Chapman University

Peter McLaren (born 2 August 1948) is a Canadian-American scholar and is known as one of the leading architects of critical pedagogy. He is known for his writings on critical literacy, sociology of education, cultural studies, critical ethnography, and Marxist theory.

McLaren is a practicing Catholic and identifies with Catholic social justice teaching and liberation theology. He is a strident critic of Christian nationalism and Catholic Integralism. McLaren helped regenerate Marxist education scholarship and has influenced a new generation of global intellectuals, including Curry Malott, Noah de Lissovoy, Tyson E. Lewis, Derek R. Ford, among many others.

== Life and career ==
Peter McLaren was born in Toronto, Ontario, on 2 August 1948, and spent a brief time living in Winnipeg, Manitoba. He began writing creatively in grade school.

He earned a Bachelor of Arts in English literature at University of Waterloo in 1973, attended Toronto Teachers College, and then earned a Bachelor of Education at the University of Toronto's Faculty of Education, a Masters of Education at Brock University's College of Education, and a Ph.D. at the Ontario Institute for Studies in Education. McLaren taught elementary and middle school from 1974-1979.

After earning his doctorate in 1983, he served as a Special Lecturer in Education at Brock University, where, as a one-year sabbatical replacement, he specialized in inner-city education and language arts. When McLaren's contract was not extended, he decided to pursue an academic appointment in the United States.

McLaren taught at Miami University's School of Education and Allied Professions from 1985-1993, where he worked with Henry Giroux during a time when critical pedagogy was gaining traction in North American schools of education. McLaren also served as Director of the Center for Education and Cultural Studies and held the title of Renowned Scholar-in-Residence at Miami University before being recruited by the Graduate School of Education and Information Studies, University of California, Los Angeles, in 1993.

In 2013, McLaren was appointed Distinguished Fellow in Critical Studies at Chapman University, Orange, California, where he worked until his retirement in 2023. He was co-director of the Paulo Freire Democratic Project and International Ambassador for Global Ethics and Social Justice. He is the honorary Director of the Center for Critical Studies in Education at Northeast Normal University, Changchun, China.

In 2019, McLaren published an autobiographical graphic novel with artist Miles Wilson.

McLaren converted from Anglicanism to Roman Catholicism when he was 35 and completing his dissertation. Subsequently, McLaren became interested in Catholic social justice teaching and liberation theology. Since then McLaren’s work has been expressly Catholic and is critical of Christians who do not believe in the eschaton.

McLaren believes that "all acts of violence generate forms of evil" and through evil and violence there can not be the Kingdom of God.

== Academic Research ==
=== 1980–1993 ===
After graduating, McLaren focused on educational theory, specifically exploring ethnography, pedagogy, curriculum, and multiculturalism. He was inspired by his undergraduate work with Elizabethan drama and William Morris, an English artist and socialist. Victor Turner, a symbolic anthropologist, was contemporaneously conducting research on rituals and how they related to dramaturgical theory and anthropology, and McLaren took inspiration from Turner. His first major publication, Schooling as a Ritual Performance Towards a Political Economy of Educational Symbols and Gestures in 1986, was based on his Ph.D. dissertation.

McLaren's work from 1984 to 1994 closely stuck with the teachings of the Frankfurt School of social theory and critical philosophy. Each of McLaren's scholarly projects attempted to explore the construction of identity in school contexts within a neoliberal society.

=== 1994–present ===
McLaren shifted focus after 1994 to critique the political economy, focusing on the social relations of production and its relation to the production of subjectivity and protagonist agency. During this time, he spent time in Latin America working with Chavistas in Venezuela and with labor and union leaders in Mexico and Colombia.

Peter McLaren began engaging with Marxist theory after meeting anti-imperialist activists in Latin America and began including aspects of it into his work.

McLaren has contributed to independent news outlets such as the LA Progressive.

Professor McLaren has participated in global social and political dialogues, including the peace process between the Turkish government and the PKK (Kurdistan Workers' Party).

=== Honorary doctorates ===
Peter McLaren was awarded an honorary doctorate by the University of Lapland, Finland, in 2004, by Universidad del Salvador, Buenos Aires, Argentina, in 2010, by the Universidad Nacional de Chilecito in La Rioja, Argentina, and the Centro de Estudios Latinoamericanos de Educación Inclusiva (CELEI), Chile, in 2021. He also received the Amigo Honorifica de la Comunidad Universitaria de esta Institucion by La Universidad Pedagogica Nacional, Unidad 141, Guadalajara, Mexico.

=== La Fundacion McLaren de Pedagogía Critica ===
In 2005, McLaren cofounded La Fundacion McLaren de Pedagogía Critica with Sergio Quiroz Miranda, to promote critical pedagogy in Latin America. On September 15, 2006 the Catedra Peter McLaren was inaugurated at the Bolivarian University of Venezuela

== Pedagogy ==
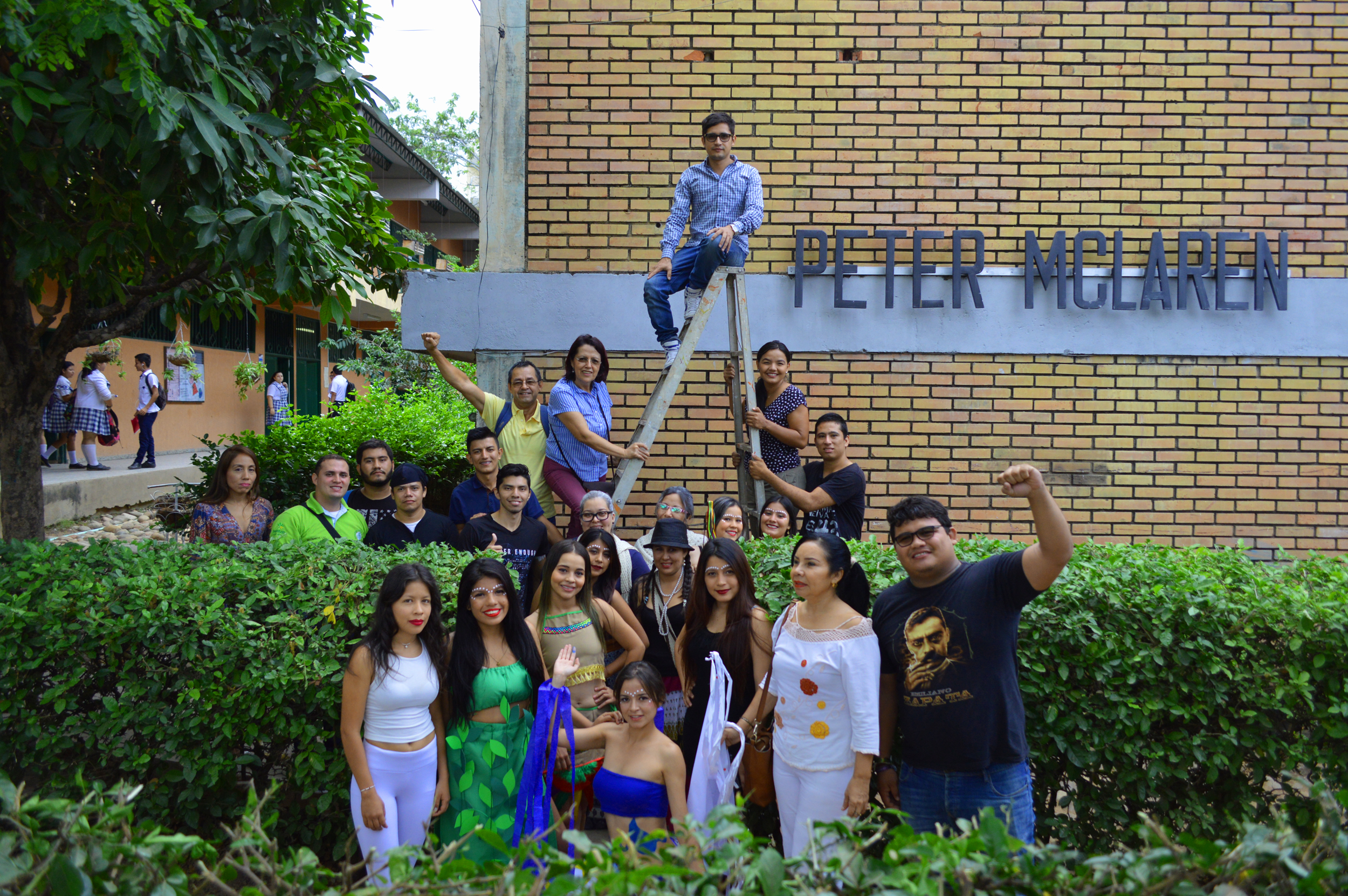
The school building (in La Escuela Normal Superior de Neiva) named after Peter McLaren in Neiva, Colombia

== Political beliefs ==
McLaren has been a fierce critic of Trumpism, stating that "Trump has put democracy on the slaughter bench of history."

In January 2006, McLaren was named as one of the faculty in the Bruin Alumni Association's controversial "Dirty Thirty" project, which listed UCLA's most politically extreme professors. The list was compiled by a former UCLA graduate student, Andrew Jones, who had previously been fired by his mentor David Horowitz for pressuring "students to file false reports about leftists" and for stealing Horowitz's mailing list of potential contributors to fund research for attacks on left-wing professors.

Following Russia's military intervention in Ukraine, McLaren began publishing books and articles surrounding the war. He serves on the editorial board of the Ukrainian journal Philosophy of Education.

== Bibliography ==
McLaren is the author, co-author, editor, and co-editor of approximately forty books and monographs. His other work has appeared in scholarly journals and professional magazines internationally. His writings have been translated into over 20 languages.

Books

- The War in Ukraine and America. DIO Press, 2022.
- Critical Pedagogy Manifesto. Teachers of the World Unite. DIO Press, 2021.
- He Walks Among Us: Christian Fascism Ushering in the End of Days. DIO Press, 2020.
- Postdigital Dialogues on Critical Pedagogy, Liberation Theology, and Information Technology (with Petar Jandric). Bloomsbury Academic, 2020.
- Breaking Free: The Life and Times of Peter McLaren, Radical Educator (with M. Wilson). Myers Education Press, 2019.
- Pedagogy of Insurrection: From Resurrection to Revolution. Peter Lang, 2016.
- Revolutionizing Pedagogy: Educating for Social Justice Within and Beyond Global Neo-liberalism (with S. Macrine, S., and D. Hill, Eds). Palgrave Macmillan, 2010.
- Academic Repression: Reflections from the Academic Industrial Complex (with A. Nocella, S. Best, S., Eds.) (2010). AK Press, 2010.
- Havoc of Capitalism. Educating for Social and Environmental Justice (with G. Martin, D. Houston, D., & Suoranta, J., (Eds.). Sense Publishers, 2010.
- Critical Pedagogies of Consumption: Living and Learning in the Shadow of the "Shopocalypse" (with Sandlin, J.A.). Routledge, 2019.
- Pedagogy and Praxis in the Age of Empire (with N. Jaramillo). Sense Publishers, 2007.
- Rage + Hope. Peter Lang, 2006.
- Capitalists and Conquerors. Rowman and Littlefield, 2005.
- Teaching Against Global Capitalism and the New Imperialism (with R. Farahmandpur). Rowman and Littlefield, 2005.
- Red Seminars: Radical Excursions into Educational Theory, Cultural Politics, and Pedagogy. Hampton Press, 2005.
- Marxism Against Postmodernism in Educational Theory (with D. Hill, M. Cole, & G. Rikowski). Lexington Books, 2002.
- Red Chalk (with M. Cole, D. Hill, and G. Rikowski). The Tufnell Press, 2000.
- Che Guevara, Paulo Freire, and the Pedagogy of Revolution. Rowman and Littlefield, 2000.
- Life in Schools: An Introduction to Critical Pedagogy in the Foundations of Education, 1998.
- Revolutionary Multiculturalism: Pedagogies of Dissent for the New Millennium. Westview Press, 1997.
- Counternarratives (with H. Giroux, C. Lankshear & M. Peters). Routledge, 1997.
- Critical Pedagogy and Predatory Culture. Routledge, 1995.
- Schooling as a ritual performance. Routledge, 1986.
- Cries from the corridor: The new suburban ghettos. Methuen, 1980.

Translations

- Sociedad, cultura y escuela (with Henry A. Giroux) (1988)
- Pedagogia crítica y postmodernidad (1992)
- Hacia una pedagogía crítica de la formación de la identidad posmoderna (1993)
- Pedagogía crítica, resistencia cultural y la producción del deseo (1994)
- Rethinking Media Literacy (1994)
- Multiculturalismo Critico (1997)
- Utopias Provisorias: As Pedagogias Criticas num cenario pos-colonial (1999)
- Pedagogia, poder e identidad (Spanish) (1999)
- A Pedagogia da Utopia (2001)
- Kriittinen Pedagogiikka (with Henry Giroux) (2001)
- Pedagogia Revolucionaria Na Globalizacao (with Ramin Farahmandpur) (2002)
- Pedagogia Critica: Contra o Imperio (2007)
- La Pedagogia Critica Revolucionaria: El Socialismo y los Desafios Actuales (2012)

McLaren debuted as a poet with his poem "The Despoiling of the American Mind" in MRZine.

== See also ==
- Critical consciousness
- Ecopedagogy
- Liberation psychology
- Post-structuralism
- Praxis intervention
- Queer pedagogy
- Radical Teacher
- Structuralism
