= Banking model of education =

Critical metaphor for traditional education

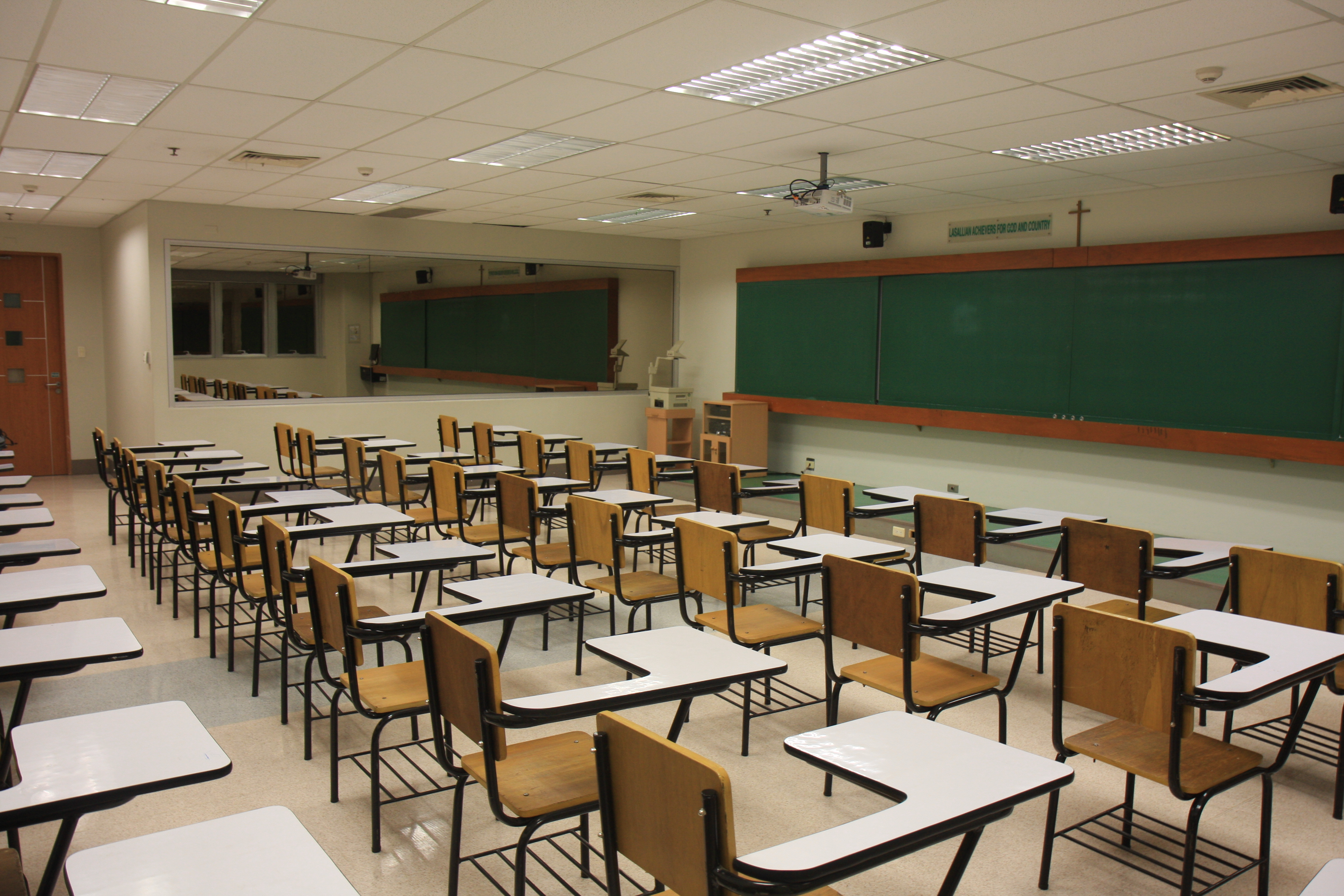
The banking model of education often places learners in a position to receive lectures by the teacher positioned as expert

Banking model of education (Portuguese: modelo bancário de educação) is a term coined by Paulo Freire to describe and critique the established education system in his book Pedagogy of the Oppressed. The name refers to the metaphor of students as containers into which educators must put knowledge. Freire argued that this model reinforces a lack of critical thinking and knowledge ownership in students, which in turn reinforces oppression, in contrast to Freire's understanding of knowledge as the result of a human, creative process.

== Definition ==
The term banking model of education was first used by Paulo Freire in his highly influential book Pedagogy of the Oppressed. Freire describes this form of education as "fundamentally narrative (in) character" with the teacher as the subject (that is, the active participant) and the students as passive objects.

Instead of communicating, the teacher issues communiqués and makes deposits which the students patiently receive, memorize, and repeat. This is the "banking" concept of education, in which the scope of action allowed to students extends only as far as receiving, filing, and storing the deposits.

Education is thus seen as a process of depositing knowledge into passive students. Teachers are the epistemological authority in this system; students' pre-existing knowledge is ignored, aside from what was expected to be 'deposited' into them earlier. Freire also refers to a banking paradigm as regarding students to be "adaptable, manageable beings. ... The more completely they accept the passive role imposed on them, the more they tend simply to adapt to the world as it is and to the fragmented view of reality deposited in them."

In the banking concept of education, knowledge is a gift bestowed by those who consider themselves knowledgeable upon those whom they consider to know nothing. ... The teacher presents himself to his students as their necessary opposite; by considering their ignorance absolute, he justifies his own existence.

== Transmission model ==
Banking education follows the transmission model of education. This model views education as a specific body of knowledge that is transmitted from the teacher to the student. It emphasizes teacher-centric learning where students are passive absorbers of information and that the purpose of learning is memorization of facts.

The transmission model is most often used in university settings as lectures. When there is a class of over 100 students the easiest method of education is through lecture where the teacher stands at the front of the class and dictates to the students.

== Possible alternative ==
One possible alternative to the banking model is the problem-based learning model (similar to what Freire called problem-posing education), in which students are encouraged to think and actively solve problems presented to them by the teacher. This model views the student as a person with prior knowledge that may be capitalized upon to reach greater results than a banking model that fails to take advantage of this capital.

== See also ==
- Constructivism (philosophy of education)
- Deschooling Society
- Inquiry-based learning
- Teaching for social justice
- Unschooling
