= Critical consciousness =

Social concept

Critical consciousness, conscientization, or conscientização in Portuguese (Portuguese pronunciation: [kõsjẽtʃizaˈsɐ̃w]), is a popular education and social concept developed by Brazilian pedagogue and educational theorist Paulo Freire, grounded in neo-Marxist critical theory. Critical consciousness focuses on achieving an in-depth understanding of the world, allowing for the perception and exposure of social and political contradictions. Critical consciousness also includes taking action against the oppressive elements in one's life that are illuminated by that understanding.

== Coinage ==
The English term conscientization is a translation of the Portuguese term conscientização, which is also translated as "consciousness raising" and "critical consciousness". The term was popularized by Brazilian educator, activist, and theorist Paulo Freire in his 1970 work Pedagogy of the Oppressed. Freire was teaching the poor and illiterate members of Brazilian society to read at a time when literacy was a requirement for suffrage and dictators ruled many South American countries. The term originally derives from Frantz Fanon's coinage of a French term, conscientiser, in his 1952 book, Black Skins, White Masks.

== Overview ==
Paulo Freire defines critical consciousness as the ability to intervene in reality in order to change it. Critical consciousness proceeds through the identification of "generative themes", which Freire identifies as "iconic representations that have a powerful emotional impact in the daily lives of learners." In this way, individual consciousness helps end the "culture of silence" in which the socially dispossessed internalize the negative images of themselves created and propagated by the oppressor in situations of extreme poverty. Liberating learners from this mimicry of the powerful, and from the fratricidal violence that results therefrom is a major goal of critical consciousness. Critical consciousness is a fundamental aspect of Freire's concept of popular education.

Arlene Goldbard, an author on the subject of community cultural development finds the concept of conscientization to be a foundation of community cultural development. From the glossary of Goldbard's 2006 book New Creative Community: "Conscientization is an ongoing process by which a learner moves toward critical consciousness. This process is the heart of liberatory education. It differs from "consciousness raising" in that the latter may involve transmission of preselected knowledge. Conscientization means engaging in praxis, in which one both reflects and takes action on their social reality to break through prevailing mythologies and reach new levels of awareness—in particular, awareness of oppression, being an "object" of others' will rather than a self-determining "subject". The process of conscientization involves identifying contradictions in experience through dialogue and becoming part of the process of changing the world."

== History of application ==
The ancient Greeks first identified the essence of critical consciousness when philosophers encouraged their students to develop an "impulse and willingness to stand back from humanity and nature... [and] to make them objects of thought and criticism, and to search for their meaning and significance. In his books Pedagogy of the Oppressed and Education for Critical Consciousness, Freire explains critical consciousness as a sociopolitical educative tool that engages learners in questioning the nature of their historical and social situation, which Freire addressed as "reading the world". The goal of critical consciousness, according to Freire, should be acting as subjects in the creation of democratic society. In education, Freire implies intergenerational equity between students and teachers in which both learn, both question, both reflect and both participate in meaning-making. Using this idea, and describing current instructional methods as homogenization and lockstep standardization, alternative approaches are proposed, such as the Sudbury model, an alternative approach in which children, by enjoying personal freedom thus encouraged to exercise personal responsibility for their actions, learn at their own pace rather than following a previously imposed chronologically-based curriculum. In a similar form students learn all the subjects, techniques and skills in these schools. The staff are minor actors, the "teacher" is an adviser and helps just when asked. The Sudbury model maintains that values, social justice, critical consciousness, intergenerational equity, and political consciousness included, must be learned through experience, as Aristotle said: "For the things we have to learn before we can do them, we learn by doing them."

Picking up on Freire's definition of critical consciousness, Joe L. Kincheloe has expanded the definition of the concept in his work on postformalism. In Kincheloe's formulation postformalism connects cognition to critical theoretical questions of power and social justice. In this context Kincheloe constructs a critical theory of cognition that explores questions of meaning, emancipation vis-a-vis ideological inscription, and a particular focus on the socio-political construction of the self. With these concerns in mind Kincheloe's postformal critical consciousness engages questions of purpose, issues of human dignity, freedom, authority, reconceptualized notions of reason, intellectual quality, and social responsibility. Postformal critical consciousness stimulates a conversation between critical pedagogy and a wide range of social, cultural, political economic, psychological, and philosophical concerns. Kincheloe employs this "multilogical conversation" to shape new modes of self-awareness, more effective forms of social, political, and pedagogical action, and an elastic model of an evolving critical consciousness (Kincheloe and Steinberg, 1993; Kincheloe, 1999; Thomas and Kincheloe, 2006).

Freire's development of critical consciousness has been expanded upon in several academic disciplines and common applications. Public health community collaborations focused on HIV prevention for women, the role of critical consciousness in adult education, and the effect of peer pressure on cigarette smokers. Freire's notion of critical consciousness is, in part, a type of political consciousness.

In educational programs for youth and adolescents, some instructors have implemented curricula aimed at encouraging students to develop a critical consciousness within subject-specific material. Instructors can teach language arts, science, and social science lessons while guiding students to connect academic material to their experiences, explore themes of social justice, and discuss these ideas collaboratively in the classroom.

In application, raising critical consciousness in young students can lead to successful outcomes in terms of students' social-emotional well-being, academic performance, and increased pursuit of careers after completing high school. While some studies provide support for developing critical consciousness in students due to the potential benefits, other studies present conflicting results. For example, research has also shown that students who demonstrate lower critical consciousness levels may experience less depressed moods and higher grades. Due to limitations associated with the predominantly qualitative designs of many studies on critical consciousness in education, further research is needed using rigorous, controlled quantitative designs to more clearly understand the relationship between critical consciousness and young students' trajectory.

== See also ==
- Adult education
- Adult literacy
- Class consciousness
- Critical pedagogy
- Consciousness raising
- Identity politics
- Liberation psychology
- Popular education
- Praxis
- Praxis intervention
- Teaching for social justice
