= Critical pedagogy =

Philosophy of education

Critical pedagogy is a philosophy of education and social movement that developed and applied concepts from critical theory and related traditions to the field of education and the study of culture.

It insists that issues of social justice and democracy are not distinct from acts of teaching and learning. The goal of critical pedagogy is emancipation from oppression through an awakening of the critical consciousness, based on the Portuguese term conscientização. Critical pedagogy was founded by the Brazilian philosopher and educator Paulo Freire, who promoted it through his 1968 book, Pedagogy of the Oppressed. It subsequently spread internationally, developing a particularly strong base in the United States, where proponents sought to develop means of using teaching to combat racism, sexism, and oppression. As it grew, it incorporated elements from fields like the Human rights movement, Civil rights movement, Disability rights movement, Indigenous rights movement, postmodern theory, feminist theory, postcolonial theory, and queer theory.

== Background ==
Critical Pedagogy is believed to have its roots in the critical theory of the Frankfurt School, which was established in 1923. In the 1960s, the German pedagogical theorist Klaus Mollenhauer published Erziehung und Emanzipation (Education and Emancipation) which situated what he called emancipatory pedagogy in the tradition of the Frankfurt school, arguing that education should emancipate youth from structures that "delimit their rationality and concomitant social action". The theory is influenced by Karl Marx who believed that inequality is a result of socioeconomic differences and that all people need to work toward a socialized economy. More recently, critical pedagogy can also be traced back to Paulo Freire's best-known 1968 work, The Pedagogy of the Oppressed. Freire, a professor of history and the philosophy of education at the Federal University of Pernambuco in Brazil, sought in this and other works to develop a philosophy of adult education that demonstrated a solidarity with the poor in their common struggle to survive by engaging them in a dialog of greater awareness and analysis. Although his family had suffered loss and hunger during the Great Depression, the poor viewed him and his formerly middle-class family "as people from another world who happened to fall accidentally into their world". His intimate discovery of class and their borders "led, invariably, to Freire's radical rejection of a class-based society".

While prominent figures within Critical Pedagogy include Paulo Freire, Henry Giroux, Peter McLaren, bell hooks, and others, their work on critical pedagogy varies in focus. For example, some approach critical pedagogy from a Marxist perspective with a focus on socioeconomic class. Paulo Freire, on the other hand, writes about how critical pedagogy can lead to liberty and freedom of the oppressed and marginalized. bell hooks applies a feminist perspective to critical pedagogy and Ira Shor, for example, advocates for the need of moving the theoretical framework of critical pedagogy to a more practical one.

The influential works of Freire made him arguably the most celebrated critical educator. He seldom used the term "critical pedagogy" himself when describing this philosophy. His initial focus targeted adult literacy projects in Brazil and later was adapted to deal with a wide range of social and educational issues. Freire's pedagogy revolved around an anti-authoritarian and interactive approach aimed to examine issues of relational power for students and workers. The center of the curriculum used the fundamental goal based on social and political critiques of everyday life. Freire's praxis required implementation of a range of educational practices and processes with the goal of creating not only a better learning environment but also a better world. Freire himself maintained that this was not merely an educational technique but a way of living in our educative practice.

Freire endorses students' ability to think critically about their education situation; this method of thinking is thought by practitioners of critical pedagogy to allow them to "recognize connections between their individual problems and experiences and the social contexts in which they are embedded". Realizing one's consciousness ("conscientization", "conscientização") is then a needed first step of "praxis", which is defined as the power and know-how to take action against oppression while stressing the importance of liberating education. "Praxis involves engaging in a cycle of theory, application, evaluation, reflection, and then back to theory. Social transformation is the product of praxis at the collective level."

Critical pedagogue Ira Shor, who was mentored by and worked closely with Freire from 1980 until Freire's death in 1997, defines critical pedagogy as:

Habits of thought, reading, writing, and speaking which go beneath surface meaning, first impressions, dominant myths, official pronouncements, traditional clichés, received wisdom, and mere opinions, to understand the deep meaning, root causes, social context, ideology, and personal consequences of any action, event, object, process, organization, experience, text, subject matter, policy, mass media, or discourse. (Empowering Education, 129)

Critical pedagogy explores the dialogic relationships between teaching and learning. Its proponents claim that it is a continuous process of what they call "unlearning", "learning", and "relearning", "reflection", "evaluation", and the effect that these actions have on the students, in particular students whom they believe have been historically and continue to be disenfranchised by what they call "traditional schooling".

The educational philosophy has since been developed by Henry Giroux and others since the 1980s as a praxis-oriented "educational movement, guided by passion and principle, to help students develop a consciousness of freedom, recognize authoritarian tendencies, and connect knowledge to power and the ability to take constructive action". Freire wrote the introduction to his 1988 work, Teachers as Intellectuals: Toward a Critical Pedagogy of Learning. Another leading critical pedagogy theorist who Freire called his "intellectual cousin", Peter McLaren, wrote the foreword. McLaren and Giroux co-edited one book on critical pedagogy and co-authored another in the 1990s. Among its other leading figures in no particular order are bell hooks (Gloria Jean Watkins), Joe L. Kincheloe, Patti Lather, Myles Horton, Antonia Darder, Gloria Ladson-Billings, Peter McLaren, Khen Lampert, Howard Zinn, Donaldo Macedo, Dermeval Saviani, Sandy Grande, Michael Apple, and Stephanie Ledesma. Educationalists including Jonathan Kozol and Parker Palmer are sometimes included in this category. Other critical pedagogues known more for their Anti-schooling, unschooling, or deschooling perspectives include Ivan Illich, John Holt, Ira Shor, John Taylor Gatto, and Matt Hern.

Critical pedagogy has several other strands and foundations. Postmodern, anti-racist, feminist, postcolonial, queer, and environmental theories all play a role in further expanding and enriching Freire's original ideas about a critical pedagogy, shifting its main focus on social class to include issues pertaining to religion, military identification, race, gender, sexuality, nationality, ethnicity, and age. Much of the work also draws on anarchism, György Lukács, Wilhelm Reich, postcolonialism, and the discourse theories of Edward Said, Antonio Gramsci, Gilles Deleuze (rhizomatic learning) and Michel Foucault. Radical Teacher is a magazine dedicated to critical pedagogy and issues of interest to critical educators. Many contemporary critical pedagogues have embraced Postmodern, anti-essentialist perspectives of the individual, of language, and of power, "while at the same time retaining the Freirean emphasis on critique, disrupting oppressive regimes of power/knowledge, and social change".

== Developments and critiques ==
Like critical theory itself, the field of critical pedagogy continues to evolve. Contemporary critical educators, such as bell hooks and Peter McLaren, discuss in their criticisms the influences of many varied concerns, institutions, and social structures, "including globalization, the mass media, and race/spiritual relations", while citing reasons for resisting the possibilities to change. McLaren has developed a social movement based version of critical pedagogy that he calls revolutionary critical pedagogy, emphasizing critical pedagogy as a social movement for the creation of a democratic socialist alternative to capitalism.

Curry Malott and Derek R. Ford's first collaborative book, Marx, Capital, and Education built on McLaren's revolutionary pedagogy by connecting it to the global class struggle and the history of the actually-existing workers' movements. As Curry Malott noted, "Critical pedagogy was created as a break from the Marxism of Freire's Pedagogy of the Oppressed and Bowles and Gintis' Schooling in Capitalist America. Even though it is true that critical pedagogy has become increasingly domesticated and watered down, it's birth was an act of counterrevolution itself." In particular, they argued for a critical pedagogy that simultaneously pursued communism and national liberation. Malott and Ford were the first authors to bring Harry Haywood's work into critical pedagogy. They believed that critical pedagogy had been divorced from its radical roots. Yet when Malott went to re-investigate those roots, he decided that they were not revolutionary at all. In fact, he argued that they were permeated by anti-communism and hostility to any what he saw as actually-existing struggles of oppressed peoples. As a result, both Malott and Ford moved away from critical pedagogy. Ford developed a political pedagogy that built on McLaren's revolutionary critical pedagogy but took "a distanced and expository position" to link the project more explicitly to communism. Yet he later abandoned that as a starting point and instead turned his attention to educational forms.

Joe L. Kincheloe and Shirley R. Steinberg have created the Paulo and Nita Freire Project for International Critical Pedagogy at McGill University. In line with Kincheloe and Steinberg's contributions to critical pedagogy, the project attempts to move the field to the next phase of its evolution. In this second phase, critical pedagogy seeks to become a worldwide, decolonizing movement dedicated to listening to and learning from diverse discourses of people from around the planet. Kincheloe and Steinberg also embrace Indigenous knowledges in education as a way to expand critical pedagogy and to question educational hegemony. Joe L. Kincheloe, in expanding on the Freire's notion that a pursuit of social change alone could promote anti-intellectualism, promotes a more balanced approach to education than postmodernists.

We cannot simply attempt to cultivate the intellect without changing the unjust social context in which such minds operate. Critical educators cannot just work to change the social order without helping to educate a knowledgeable and skillful group of students. Creating a just, progressive, creative, and democratic society demands both dimensions of this pedagogical progress.

One of the major texts taking on the intersection between critical pedagogy and Indigenous knowledge(s) is Sandy Grande's, Red Pedagogy: Native American Social and Political Thought (Rowman and Littlefield, 2004). In agreement with this perspective, Four Arrows, aka Don Trent Jacobs, challenges the anthropocentrism of critical pedagogy and writes that to achieve its transformative goals there are other differences between Western and Indigenous worldview that must be considered. Approaching the intersection of Indigenous perspectives and pedagogy from another perspective, critical pedagogy of place examines the impacts of place.

=== In the classroom ===
Ira Shor, a professor at the City University of New York, provides for an example of how critical pedagogy is used in the classroom. He develops these themes in looking at the use of Freirean teaching methods in the context of the everyday life of classrooms, in particular, institutional settings. He suggests that the whole curriculum of the classroom must be re-examined and reconstructed. He favors a change of role of the student from object to active, critical subject. In doing so, he suggests that students undergo a struggle for ownership of themselves. He states that students have previously been lulled into a sense of complacency by the circumstances of everyday life and that through the processes of the classroom, they can begin to envision and strive for something different for themselves.

Of course, achieving such a goal is not automatic nor easy, as he suggests that the role of the teacher is critical to this process. Students need to be helped by teachers to separate themselves from unconditional acceptance of the conditions of their own existence. Once this separation is achieved, then students may be prepared for critical re-entry into an examination of everyday life. In a classroom environment that achieves such liberating intent, one of the potential outcomes is that the students themselves assume more responsibility for the class. Power is thus distributed amongst the group and the role of the teacher becomes much more mobile, not to mention more challenging. This encourages the growth of each student's intellectual character rather than a mere "mimicry of the professorial style."

Teachers, however, do not simply abdicate their authority in a student-centered classroom. In the later years of his life, Freire grew increasingly concerned with what he felt was a major misinterpretation of his work and insisted that teachers cannot deny their position of authority.

Critical teachers, therefore, must admit that they are in a position of authority and then demonstrate that authority in their actions in supports of students... [A]s teachers relinquish the authority of truth providers, they assume the mature authority of facilitators of student inquiry and problem-solving. In relation to such teacher authority, students gain their freedom--they gain the ability to become self-directed human beings capable of producing their own knowledge.

— Joe L. Kincheloe, Critical Pedagogy Primer p. 17

And due to the student-centeredness that critical pedagogy insists upon, there are inherent conflicts associated with the "large collections of top-down content standards in their disciplines". Critical pedagogy advocates insist that teachers themselves are vital to the discussion about Standards-based education reform in the United States because a pedagogy that requires a student to learn or a teacher to teach externally imposed information exemplifies the banking model of education outlined by Freire where the structures of knowledge are left unexamined. To the critical pedagogue, the teaching act must incorporate social critique alongside the cultivation of intellect.

Joe L. Kincheloe argues that this is in direct opposition to the epistemological concept of positivism, where "social actions should proceed with law-like predictability". In this philosophy, a teacher and their students would be served by Standards-based education where there is "only be one correct way to teach" as "[e]veryone is assumed to be the same regardless of race, class, or gender". Donald Schön's concept of "indeterminate zones of practice" illustrates how any practice, especially ones with human subjects at their center, are infinitely complex and highly contested, which amplify the critical pedagogue's unwillingness to apply universal practices.

Furthermore, bell hooks, who is greatly influenced by Freire, points out the importance of engaged pedagogy and the responsibility that teachers, as well as students, must have in the classroom:

Teachers must be aware of themselves as practitioners and as human beings if they wish to teach students in a non-threatening, anti-discriminatory way. Self-actualisation should be the goal of the teacher as well as the students.

== Resistance from students ==
Students sometimes resist critical pedagogy. Student resistance to critical pedagogy can be attributed to a variety of reasons. Student objections may be due to ideological reasons, religious or moral convictions, fear of criticism, or discomfort with controversial issues. Kristen Seas argues: "Resistance in this context thus occurs when students are asked to shift not only their perspectives, but also their subjectivities as they accept or reject assumptions that contribute to the pedagogical arguments being constructed." Karen Kopelson asserts that resistance to new information or ideologies, introduced in the classroom, is a natural response to persuasive messages that are unfamiliar.

Resistance is often, at the least, understandably protective: As anyone who can remember her or his own first uneasy encounters with particularly challenging new theories or theorists can attest, resistance serves to shield us from uncomfortable shifts or all-out upheavals in perception and understanding-shifts in perception which, if honored, force us to inhabit the world in fundamentally new and different ways.

Kristen Seas further explains: "Students [often] reject the teacher's message because they see it as coercive, they do not agree with it, or they feel excluded by it." Karen Kopelson concludes "that many if not most students come to the university in order to gain access to and eventual enfranchisement in 'the establishment,' not to critique and reject its privileges."

== Critical pedagogy of teaching ==
The rapidly changing demographics of the classroom in the United States has resulted in an unprecedented amount of linguistic and cultural diversity. In order to respond to these changes, advocates of critical pedagogy call into question the focus on practical skills of teacher credential programs. "[T]his practical focus far too often occurs without examining teachers' own assumptions, values, and beliefs and how this ideological posture informs, often unconsciously, their perceptions and actions when working with linguistic-minority and other politically, socially, and economically subordinated students." As teaching is considered an inherently political act to the critical pedagogue, a more critical element of teacher education becomes addressing implicit biases (also known as implicit cognition or implicit stereotypes) that can subconsciously affect a teacher's perception of a student's ability to learn.

Advocates of critical pedagogy insist that teachers, then, must become learners alongside their students, as well as students of their students. They must become experts beyond their field of knowledge, and immerse themselves in the culture, customs, and lived experiences of the students they aim to teach.

== Criticism ==
Critical pedagogy has been the subject of varied debates inside and outside the field of education. Philosopher John Searle characterized the goal of Giroux's form of critical pedagogy "to create political radicals", thus highlighting the antagonistic moral and political grounds of the ideals of citizenship and "public wisdom." These varying moral perspectives of what is right are to be found in what John Dewey has referred to as the tensions between traditional and progressive education. Searle argued that critical pedagogy's objections to the Western canon are misplaced and/or disingenuous:

Precisely by inculcating a critical attitude, the "canon" served to demythologize the conventional pieties of the American bourgeoisie and provided the student with a perspective from which to critically analyze American culture and institutions. Ironically, the same tradition is now regarded as oppressive. The texts once served an unmasking function; now we are told that it is the texts which must be unmasked.

In 1992, Maxine Hairston took a hard line against critical pedagogy in the first year college composition classroom and argued, "everywhere I turn I find composition faculty, both leaders in the profession and new voices, asserting that they have not only the right, but the duty, to put ideology and radical politics at the center of their teaching." Hairston further confers,

When classes focus on complex issues such as racial discrimination, economic injustices, and inequities of class and gender, they should be taught by qualified faculty who have the depth of information and historical competence that such critical social issues warrant. Our society's deep and tangled cultural conflicts can neither be explained nor resolved by simplistic ideological formulas.

Sharon O'Dair (2003) said that compositionists "focus [...] almost exclusively on ideological matters", and further argues that this focus is at the expense of proficiency of student writing skills in the composition classroom. To this end, O'Dair explained that "recently advocated working-class pedagogies privilege activism over "language instruction." Jeff Smith argued that students want to gain, rather than to critique, positions of privilege, as encouraged by critical pedagogues.

Scholars who have worked in the field of critical pedagogy have also critiqued the movement from various angles. In 2016, Curry Stephenson Malott, who had written several books about critical pedagogy and identified as a critical pedagogue, renounced and critiqued his previous work. In History and Education: Engaging the Global Class War, he writes about his "long journey of self-reflection and de-indoctrination" that culminated in the break. Malott writes that "the term critical pedagogy was created by Henry Giroux (1981) as an attempt to dismiss socialism and the legacy of Karl Marx." During the same period, Derek R. Ford also broke with critical pedagogy, claiming that it was "at a dead end." While Ford is not concerned with "proficiency" like O'Dair, he agrees that the focus on critique at the expense of imagination and actual political engagement serves to produce the critical pedagogue as "the enlightened and isolated researcher that reveals the truth behind the curtain." Both Malott and Ford, however, note exceptions to their critiques within the field, such as the work of Peter McLaren.

== See also ==
- Adult education
- Critical psychology
- Inclusive school
- John Asimakopoulos
- Pedagogy of the Oppressed
- Praxis intervention
- Praxis School
- Rouge Forum
- Social criticism
- Student voice
