= Paulo Freire =

Brazilian educator (1921–1997)

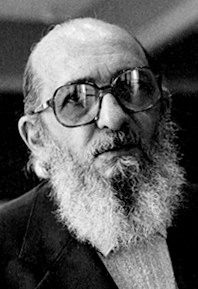
- Freire in 1977
- Born: Paulo Reglus Neves Freire; 19 September 1921; Recife, Pernambuco, Brazil
- Died: 2 May 1997 (aged 75); São Paulo, São Paulo, Brazil
- Education: Universidade Federal de Pernambuco
- Political party: Workers' Party
- Spouses: Elza Freire (m. 1944; died 1986); Ana Maria Araújo Freire (m. 1988)

Scholarly background
- Influences: Zevedei Barbu; John Dewey; Frantz Fanon; Erich Fromm; Antonio Gramsci; Saul Alinsky; Gustavo Gutiérrez; G. W. F. Hegel; Tan Malaka; Herbert Marcuse; Jacques Maritain; Emmanuel Mounier; Karl Marx; Sigmund Freud; Charles Darwin; Friedrich Nietzsche; Albert Memmi; Álvaro Vieira Pinto; Jean-Paul Sartre; Anísio Teixeira; Miguel de Unamuno; Simone Weil

Scholarly work
- Discipline: Pedagogy; philosophy
- School or tradition: Educator; critical pedagogy; Philosopher
- Notable works: Pedagogy of the Oppressed (1968)
- Notable ideas: Banking model of education; critical consciousness
- Influenced: Fazle Hasan Abed; Marcella Althaus-Reid; Stanley Aronowitz; Christine Ballengee-Morris; Ana Mae Barbosa; Steve Biko; Augusto Boal; Leonardo Boff; Francisco Brennand; Fernando Cardenal; Enrique Martinez Celaya; Vicky Colbert; James H. Cone; Antonia Darder; Mestre Ferradura; Ramón Flecha; Moacir Gadotti; Henry Giroux; Cees Hamelink; bell hooks; Didacus Jules; Karen Keifer-Boyd; Joe L. Kincheloe; James D. Kirylo; Jonathan Kozol; Khen Lampert; Colin Lankshear; Allan Luke; Donaldo Macedo; Ignacio Martín-Baró; Peter Mayo; Alan McCombes; Peter McLaren; Jack Mezirow; Oscar Mogollon; G. Nammalvar; Gino Piccio; Majid Rahnema; Howard Richards; Marshall Rosenberg; Ira Shor; Shirley R. Steinberg; Carlos Alberto Torres; María Guillermina Valdes Villalva; Cornel West

Paulo Reglus Neves Freire (19 September 1921 – 2 May 1997) was a Brazilian educator and Marxist philosopher whose work has affected global thought on education. He is best known for Pedagogy of the Oppressed, in which he reimagines teaching as a political act of liberation rather than critical cultural transmission of values. A founder of critical pedagogy, Freire’s influence spans literacy movements, liberation theology, postcolonial education, Marxism, and contemporary theories of social justice and learning. He is widely regarded as one of the most important educational theorists of the twentieth century, alongside figures such as John Dewey and Maria Montessori.

== Biography ==
Freire was born on 19 September 1921 to a middle-class family in Recife, the State Capital of Pernambuco in the Brazilian Northeast. He became familiar with poverty and hunger from an early age partly due to the effects of the Great Depression. In 1931, Freire moved with his family to Jaboatão dos Guararapes, located 18 kilometers south of the Historic Center of Recife. His father died on 31 October 1934. Freire was raised Catholic and remained in the faith throughout his life.

During his childhood and adolescence, Freire ended up four grades behind, and his social life revolved around playing pick-up football with other poor children, from whom he claims to have learned a great deal. These experiences shaped his concerns for the poor and helped to construct his particular educational viewpoint. Freire stated that poverty and hunger severely affected his ability to learn. These experiences influenced his decision to dedicate his life to improving the lives of the poor: "I didn't understand anything because of my hunger. I wasn't dumb. It wasn't lack of interest. My social condition didn't allow me to have an education. Experience showed me once again the relationship between social class and knowledge". Eventually, his family's misfortunes turned around and their prospects improved.

Freire enrolled in law school at the University of Recife in 1943. He also studied philosophy, more specifically phenomenology, and the psychology of language. Although admitted to the legal bar, he never practiced law and instead worked as a secondary school Portuguese teacher. In 1944, he married Elza Maia Costa de Oliveira, a fellow teacher. The two worked together and had five children.

In 1946, Freire was appointed director of the Pernambuco Department of Education and Culture. Working primarily among the illiterate poor, Freire began to develop an educational praxis that had an influence on the liberation theology movement of the 1970s. In 1940s Brazil, literacy was a requirement for voting in presidential elections.

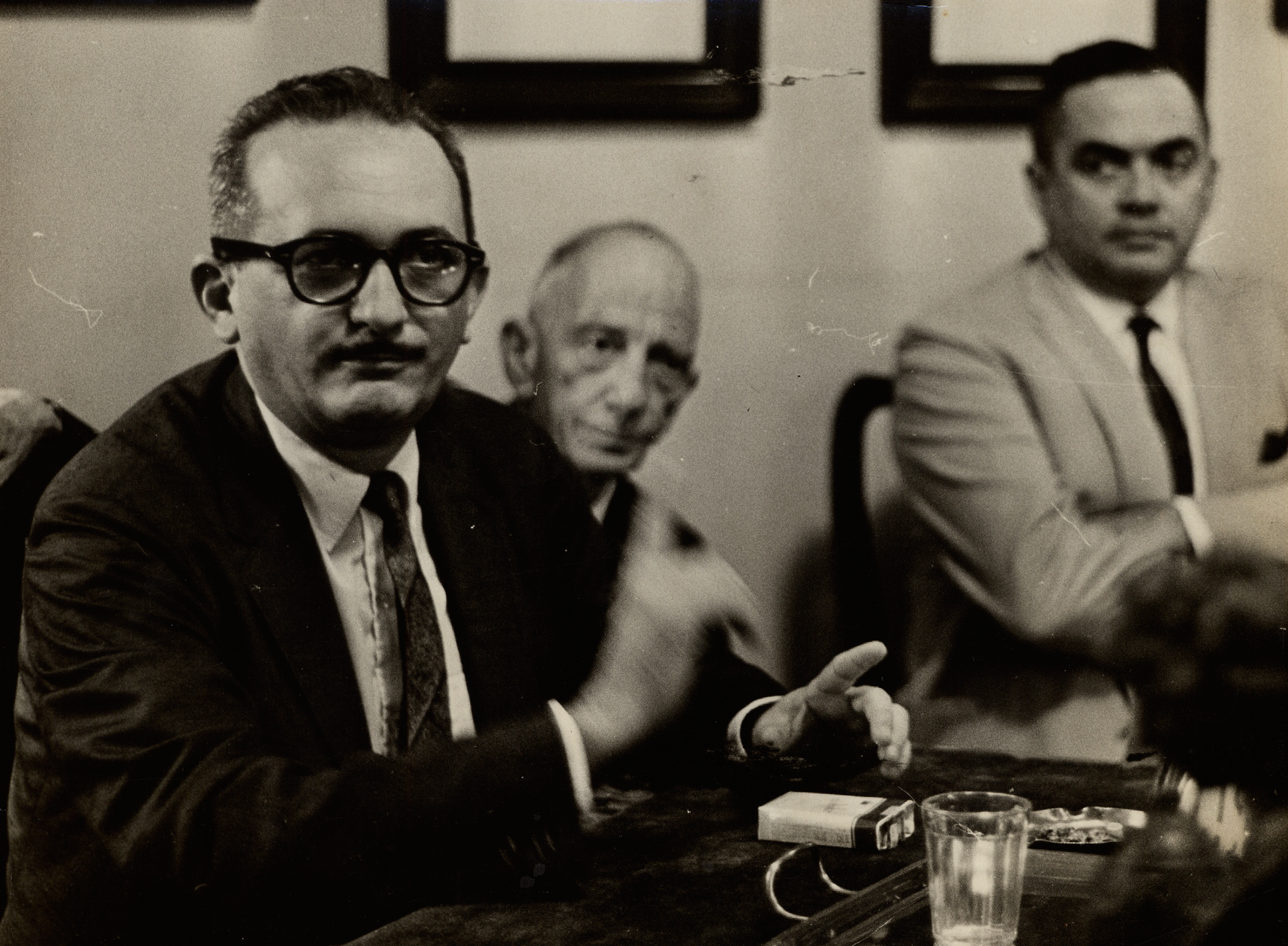
Freire in 1963

In 1961, he was appointed director of the Department of Cultural Extension at the University of Recife. In 1962, he had the first opportunity for large-scale application of his theories, when, in an experiment, 300 sugarcane harvesters were taught to read and write in just 45 days. In response to this experiment, the Brazilian government approved the creation of thousands of cultural circles across the country.

The 1964 Brazilian coup d'état put an end to Freire's literacy effort, as the ruling military junta did not endorse it. Freire was subsequently imprisoned as a traitor for 70 days. After a brief exile in Bolivia, Freire worked in Chile for five years for the Christian Democratic Agrarian Reform Movement and the United Nations Food and Agriculture Organization. In 1967, Freire published his first book, Education as the Practice of Freedom. He followed it up with his most famous work, Pedagogy of the Oppressed, which was first published in 1968.

After a positive international reception of his work, Freire was offered a visiting professorship at Harvard University in 1969. The next year, Pedagogy of the Oppressed was published in Spanish and English, vastly expanding its reach. Because of political feuds between Freire, a Christian socialist, and Brazil's successive right-wing authoritarian military governments, the book went unpublished in Brazil until 1974, when, starting with the presidency of Ernesto Geisel, the military junta started a process of slow and controlled political liberalisation.

Following a year in Cambridge, Massachusetts, Freire moved to Geneva to work as a special education advisor to the World Council of Churches. During this time Freire acted as an advisor on education reform in several former Portuguese colonies in Africa, particularly Guinea-Bissau and Mozambique. In 1979, he first visited Brazil after more than a decade of exile, eventually moving back in 1980. Freire joined the Workers' Party (PT) in São Paulo and acted as a supervisor for its adult literacy project from 1980 to 1986. When the Workers' Party won the 1988 São Paulo mayoral elections in 1988, Freire was appointed municipal Secretary of Education. Freire is widely considered the grandfather of Critical Education Theory. Freire died of heart failure on 2 May 1997, in São Paulo.

== Pedagogy ==
There is no such thing as a neutral education process. Education either functions as an instrument which is used to facilitate the integration of generations into the logic of the present system and bring about conformity to it, or it becomes the "practice of freedom", the means by which men and women deal critically with reality and discover how to participate in the transformation of their world.

— Richard Shaull, introduction to the 13th edition of Pedagogy of the Oppressed

Freire contributed a philosophy of education which blended classical approaches stemming from Plato and modern Marxist, post-Marxist, and anti-colonialist thinkers. His Pedagogy of the Oppressed (1968) can be read as an extension of, or reply to, Frantz Fanon's The Wretched of the Earth (1961), which emphasized the need to provide native populations with an education which was simultaneously new and modern, rather than traditional, and anti-colonial – not simply an extension of the colonizing culture.

In Pedagogy of the Oppressed, Freire, reprising the oppressors–oppressed distinction, applies the distinction to education, championing that education should allow the oppressed to regain their sense of humanity, in turn overcoming their condition. Nevertheless, he acknowledges that for this to occur, the oppressed individual must play a role in their liberation.

No pedagogy which is truly liberating can remain distant from the oppressed by treating them as unfortunates and by presenting for their emulation models from among the oppressors. The oppressed must be their own example in the struggle for their redemption.

Likewise, oppressors must be willing to rethink their way of life and to examine their own role in oppression if true liberation is to occur: "Those who authentically commit themselves to the people must re-examine themselves constantly".

Freire believed education could not be divorced from politics; the act of teaching and learning are considered political acts in and of themselves. Freire defined this connection as a main tenet of critical pedagogy. Teachers and students must be made aware of the politics that surround education. The way students are taught and what they are taught serves a political agenda. Teachers, themselves, have political notions they bring into the classroom. Freire believed that

Education makes sense because women and men learn that through learning they can make and remake themselves, because women and men are able to take responsibility for themselves as beings capable of knowing—of knowing that they know and knowing that they don't.

=== Criticism of the "banking model" of education ===
In terms of pedagogy, Freire is best known for his criticism of what he called the "banking" concept of education, in which students are viewed as empty accounts to be filled by teachers. He notes that "it transforms students into receiving objects [and] attempts to control thinking and action, lead[ing] men and women to adjust to the world, inhibit[ing] their creative power." The basic critique was not entirely novel, and paralleled Jean-Jacques Rousseau's conception of children as active learners, as opposed to a tabula rasa view, more akin to the banking model. John Dewey was also strongly critical of the transmission of mere facts as the goal of education. Dewey often described education as a mechanism for social change, stating that "education is a regulation of the process of coming to share in the social consciousness; and that the adjustment of individual activity on the basis of this social consciousness is the only sure method of social reconstruction". Freire's work revived this view and placed it in context with contemporary theories and practices of education, laying the foundation for what was later termed critical pedagogy.

=== Culture of silence ===
According to Freire, unequal social relations create a "culture of silence" that instills the oppressed with a negative, passive and suppressed self-image; learners must, then, develop a critical consciousness in order to recognize that this culture of silence is created to oppress. A culture of silence can also cause the "dominated individuals [to] lose the means by which to critically respond to the culture that is forced on them by a dominant culture."

He considers social, race and class dynamics to be interlaced into the conventional education system, through which this culture of silence eliminates the "paths of thought that lead to a language of critique."

== Legacy and reception ==
Since the publication of the English-language edition in 1970, Pedagogy of the Oppressed has had a large impact in education and pedagogy worldwide, especially as a defining work of critical pedagogy. According to Israeli writer and education reform theorist Sol Stern, it has "achieved near-iconic status in America's teacher-training programs". Connections have also been made between Freire's non-dualism theory in pedagogy and Eastern philosophical traditions such as the Advaita Vedanta.

In 1977, the Adult Learning Project, based on Freire's work, was established in the Gorgie-Dalry neighborhood of Edinburgh, Scotland. This project had the participation of approximately 200 people in the first years, and had among its aims to provide affordable and relevant local learning opportunities and to build a network of local tutors. In Scotland, Freire's ideas of popular education influenced activist movements not only in Edinburgh but Glasgow and Dundee influencing the Labour controlled Tayside Regional Council from 1986 onward.

Freire's major exponents in North America are bell hooks, Henry Giroux, Peter McLaren, Donaldo Macedo, Antonia Darder, Joe L. Kincheloe, Shirley R. Steinberg, Carlos Alberto Torres, and Ira Shor. One of McLaren's edited texts, Paulo Freire: A Critical Encounter, expounds upon Freire's impact in the field of critical pedagogy. McLaren has also provided a comparative study concerning Paulo Freire and Argentinian revolutionary icon Che Guevara. Freire's work influenced the radical math movement in the United States, which emphasizes social justice issues and critical pedagogy as components of mathematical curricula.

In South Africa, Freire's ideas and methods were central to the 1970s Black Consciousness Movement, often associated with Steve Biko, as well as the trade union movement in the 1970s and 1980s, and the United Democratic Front in the 1980s. The radical doctor Abu Baker Asvat was among the many prominent anti-apartheid activists who used Freire's methods. Today there is a Paulo Freire Project at the University of KwaZulu-Natal in Pietermaritzburg and Abahlali baseMjondolo, a radical movement of the urban poor, continues to use Freirian methods.

In 1991, the Paulo Freire Institute was established in São Paulo to extend and elaborate upon his theories of popular education. The institute has started projects in many countries and is headquartered at the UCLA Graduate School of Education and Information Studies, where it actively maintains the Freire archives. Its director is UCLA professor Carlos Torres, the author of several Freirean works, including the 1978 A praxis educativa de Paulo Freire.

In 1999 PAULO, a national training organisation named in honour of Freire, was established in the United Kingdom. This agency was approved by the New Labour Government to represent some 300,000 community-based education practitioners working across the UK. PAULO was given formal responsibility for setting the occupational training standards for people working in this field.

The Paulo and Nita Freire Project for International Critical Pedagogy was founded at McGill University. Here Joe L. Kincheloe and Shirley R. Steinberg worked to create a dialogical forum for critical scholars around the world to promote research and re-create a Freirean pedagogy in a multinational domain. After the death of Kincheloe, the project was transformed into a virtual global resource.

Shortly before his death, Freire was working on a book of ecopedagogy, a platform of work carried on by many of the Freire Institutes and Freirean Associations around the world today. It has been influential in helping to develop planetary education projects such as the Earth Charter as well as countless international grassroots campaigns in the spirit of Freirean popular education generally.

Freirean literacy methods have been adopted throughout the developing world. In the Philippines, Catholic "base Christian communities" adopted Freire's methods in community education. Papua New Guinea, Freirean literacy methods were used as part of the World Bank-funded Southern Highlands Rural Development Program's Literacy Campaign. Freirean approaches also lie at the heart of the "Dragon Dreaming" approach to community programs that have spread to 20 countries by 2014.

=== Awards and honors ===
- King Baudouin International Development Prize 1980: Paulo Freire was the first person to receive this prize. He was nominated by Mathew Zachariah, Professor of Education at the University of Calgary.
- Prize for Outstanding Christian Educators, with his wife Elza
- UNESCO Prize for Peace Education 1986
- Honorary Doctorate, the University of Nebraska at Omaha, 1996, along with Augusto Boal, during their residency at the Second Pedagogy and Theatre of the Oppressed Conference in Omaha.
- Honorary Degree from Claremont Graduate University, 1992
- Honorary Doctorate from The Open University, 1973
- Inducted, International Adult and Continuing Education Hall of Fame, 2008
- Honorary Degree from the University of Illinois at Chicago, 1993.

== Bibliography ==
Freire wrote and co-wrote more than 20 books on education, pedagogy and related themes.

His works include:

- Cultural Action for Freedom. [Cambridge], Harvard Educational Review, 1970.
- Pedagogy of the Oppressed. New York: Continuum, 1970.
- Unusual ideas about education. UNESCO, 1971.
- Education for Critical Consciousness. New York: Seabury Press, 1973, ISBN 978-0816491131.
- Conscientization. Geneva: World Council of Churches, 1975.
- Education, the Practice of Freedom. London: Writers and Readers Publishing Cooperative, 1976.
- Pedagogy in Process: The Letters to Guinea-Bissau. New York: A Continuum Book: The Seabury Press, 1978.
- The Politics of Education: Culture, Power, and Liberation. South Hadley, Massachusetts: Bergin & Garvey, 1985.
- (With Shor, Ira), A Pedagogy for Liberation, dialogues on transforming education, Macmillan Education LTD, 1987.
- Shor, Ira (editor), Freire for the Classroom: A Sourcebook for Liberatory Teaching, Boynton/Cook Publishers Inc, 1987.
- (With Donaldo Macedo) Literacy: Reading the Word and the World. South Hadley, MA: Bergin & Garvey Publishers, 1987.
- We Make the Road by Walking, Conversations on Education and Social Change. Philadelphia: Temple University Press, 1990.
- (With Antonion Faundez) Learning to Question: A Pedagogy of Liberation, trans. Tony Coates. New York: Continuum, 1992.
- Pedagogy of the City. New York: Continuum, 1993.
- Education and Community Involvement. In Critical Education in the New Information Age. Boulder: Rowman & Littlefield Publishers Inc., 1994.
- (With Ana Maria Araújo Freire) Pedagogy of Hope: Reliving Pedagogy of the Oppressed. New York: Continuum, 1994.
- We Can Reinvent the World. In Critical Theory and Educational Research. New York: State University of New York, Albany, 1995.
- Preface. In Pedagogy of Praxis, a dialectical philosophy of education. New York: Routledge, 1996.
- Letters to Cristina: Reflections on My Life and Work. New York: Routledge, 1996.
- Mentoring the Mentor: A Critical Dialogue with Paulo Freire. New York: P. Lang, 1997.
- (With Ana Maria Araújo Freire) Pedagogy of the Heart. New York: Continuum, 1997.
- Pedagogy of Freedom: Ethics, Democracy and Civic Courage. Lanham: Rowman & Littlefield Publishers, 1998.
- Politics and Education. Los Angeles: UCLA Latin American Center Publications, 1998.
- Teachers as Cultural Workers: Letters to Those Who Dare Teach. Boulder, Colorado: Westview Press, 1998.
- Education and Community Involvement. In Critical Education in the New Information Age. Boulder: Rowman & Littlefield, 1999.
- Pedagogy of Indignation. New York: Routledge, 2004.
- Daring to Dream, toward a pedagogy of the unfinished. New York: Routledge, 2007.
- Epilogue: Freire's Roots in his Own Words. In Paulo Freire's Intellectual Roots, towards historicity in praxis. New York: Bloomsbury Academic, 2013.
- Pedagogy of Commitment. Boulder, Colorado: Paradigm Publishers, 2014.
- Pedagogy of Solidarity. In Pedagogy of Solidarity. New York: Routledge, 2014.

== See also ==
- Adult education
- Clodomir Santos de Morais
- Culture circle
- Dialogic education
- Dialogic learning
- Dialogic pedagogy
- Raya Dunayevskaya
- Education in Brazil
- James D. Kirylo
- Landless Workers' Movement
- Marxist humanism
- Paulo Freire University
- Peer mentoring
- Popular education
- Praxis intervention
- Problem-posing education
- Rouge Forum
- Second Episcopal Conference of Latin America
- Structure and agency
- Theatre of the Oppressed

Awards
New award	King Baudouin International Development Prize; 1980–1981; With: Consultative Group for International Agricultural Research	Succeeded by A. T. Ariyaratne
Preceded by Indar Jit Rikhye	UNESCO Prize for Peace Education; 1986	Succeeded by Laurence Deonna
