= Howard Richards =

Howard Richards may refer to:

- Howard Richards (academic) (1938–2024), American-Chilean social scientist
- Howard Richards (American football) (born 1959), American NFL player
