= Christine Morris =

Christine Morris may refer to:

- Christine Morris series, a book series by Maureen Jennings
- Christine Wigfall Morris (1922–2014), American librarian
- Christine E. Morris, Irish archaeologist

== See also ==
- Christine Ballengee-Morris (born 1955), professor at Ohio State University
