= Shirley R. Steinberg =

American academic

- Born: Baltimore, Maryland, U.S.
- Education: Pennsylvania State University
- Known for: Critical multiculturalism, Inclusion, Shared Leadership, Kinderculture, Post-formal theory, Qualitative Research Bricolage
- Scientific career
- Fields: Education, media studies, cultural studies, leadership and learning, critical pedagogy, Islamophobia, youth and community studies
- Workplaces: University of Calgary

Shirley R. Steinberg is an educator, author, activist, filmmaker, and public speaker whose work focuses on critical pedagogy, transformative leadership, social justice, and cultural studies. She has written and edited numerous books and articles about equitable pedagogies and leadership, urban and youth culture, community studies, cultural studies, Islamophobia, and issues of inclusion, race, class, gender, and sexuality. Steinberg was the Research Chair of Critical Youth Studies at the University of Calgary for two terms, executive director of the Freire Project freireproject.org, and a visiting researcher at University of Barcelona and Murdoch University. She has held faculty positions at Montclair State University, Adelphi University, Brooklyn College, The CUNY Graduate Center, and McGill University. Steinberg directed the Institute for Youth and Community Research at the University of the West of Scotland for two years.

She is a frequent media contributor to CJAD Radio, CBC Radio One, CTV, The Toronto Globe and Mail, The Canadian Press, and The Montreal Gazette. Steinberg worked at Peter Lang Publishing as the executive editor of education for twenty years, and with Joe L. Kincheloe she created Counterpoints: Studies in the Postmodern Theory of Education, the largest book series on Education in publishing. The organizer of The International Institute for Critical Pedagogy and Transformative Leadership [freireproject.org], her work centers on creating a global community of transformative educators and community workers engaged in radical love, social justice, and the situating of power within social and cultural contexts.

== Education ==
Steinberg received two degrees from the University of Lethbridge, Alberta, Canada, a B.Ed in English language and arts education in 1987 and a M.Ed in 1991. In 1997, she received her Ph.D. in curriculum and instruction from Pennsylvania State University.

== Professional career ==
With her partner Joe L. Kincheloe, Steinberg founded The Paulo and Nita Freire International Project for Critical Pedagogy (freireproject.org) at McGill University. After Kincheloe's death, the project transformed into a digital archive of global initiatives on critical pedagogy. Steinberg serves as the project's executive director.

She was the founding director of The Werklund Foundation's Youth Leadership Centre (YLC), launched in the Werklund School for Education at the University of Calgary, July 2011-March 2014. From 2015 to 2017, she directed the Institute for Youth and Community Research at the University of the West of Scotland.

Steinberg is the Managing Editor of The International Journal of Critical Pedagogy and with Kincheloe, a founding editor and now consulting editor of Taboo: The Journal of Culture and Education.

=== Awards and honors ===
Steinberg has been recognized for her teaching, activism, and scholarship in the field of education and for her mentorship of students, community members, and colleagues. She was the 2019-2022 recipient of The Whitworth Award for Career Education Research Excellence. In 1997, Steinberg and co-editors Joe L. Kincheloe and Aaron D. Gresson III received the Gustavus Myers Outstanding Book Award from the Gustavus Myers Center for the Study of Bigotry and Human Rights for their book Measured Lies: The Bell Curve Examined.

In 1999, she received the Adelphi University Woman of Distinction award. The University of Lethbridge's Alumni Association recognized Steinberg as the Distinguished Alumna of the Year in 2006.

Steinberg has received the American Educational Studies Association's Critics' Choice Book Award for several of her publications:

- 2000: White Reign: Deploying Whiteness in America co-edited with Kincheloe, Rodriguez, N., & R. Chennault
- 2007: Nineteen Questions: Teaching in the City (co-edited with Kincheloe).
- 2012: Critical Qualitative Research Reader (co-edited with Gaile S. Cannella).
- 2014: Critical Youth Studies Reader (co-edited with Awad Ibrahim).
- 2022: Sage Handbook of Critical Pedagogies (co-edited with Barry Down).

Additional awards received by Steinberg:

- 2019-2022: The Whitworth Award: Recognizing Career Educational Excellence, The EdCan Network.
- 2011: Paulo Freire Lifetime Achievement Award for Social Justice and Education, Chapman University Faculty of Education.

- 2013: Cinema Perpetuum Mobile Film Festival Screening Selection: Seeing through Paulo's Glasses: Political Clarity, Courage, and Humility. Producer and Co-Director, with Dr. G. Cucinelli. CPM, Minsk, Belarus.
- 2014: Lifetime Achievement Award, International Conference for Critical Media Literacy. Normal, Illinois.
- 2016: Distinguished Lecturer University of Calgary.

== Scholarship ==
=== Critical multiculturalism ===
Critical Multiculturalism is a pedagogy focused on the intersection of power, identity and knowledge. Steinberg laid out its framework in her 2001 book, Multi/Intercultural Conversations, though Kincheloe and Steinberg introduced the concept in their 1997 book, Changing Multiculturalism. In a 1998 review, Dr. Stephen Bigger writes, "'Different ways of seeing' could be a powerful concept to underpin a challenging and transformative curriculum, encouraging 'learning from difference'." He explains further:

Multiculturalism, a problematic term, is clarified into a position called 'critical multiculturalism', described with approval inasfar as it explores 'the way power shapes consciousness'...Race, gender and class are seen as linked as forms of oppression rooted in social and economic structures. These forces of oppression play out in the classroom, through which pupils construct their own understandings, sense of identity and aspirations...We can view the classroom as 'a central site for the legitimization of myths, lies and silences about non-white, lower socio-economic class and other marginalized individuals'.

=== Media literacy ===
Steinberg's courses revolve around the critical pedagogical approach to media, as defined in a book co-edited with Donaldo Macedo:Media Literacy: A Reader. Central is the notion that social, cultural, and political forces affect human agency. According to the publisher's website, the authors' conception of media literacy, "analyzes the ways our everyday decisions are encoded and inscribed by emotional and bodily commitments relating to the production of desire and mood, all of which leads, in Noam Chomsky's famous phrase, to the 'manufacture of consent.'"

=== Kinderculture ===
Steinberg and Kincheloe introduce their notion of "kinderculture" in Kinderculture: The Corporate Construction of Childhood (Westview Press 1997), an edited collection of essays focusing on the social construction of childhood in contemporary America. According to Steinberg and Kincheloe, "our society's most influential pedagogues are no longer classroom teachers" or parents. Instead, large corporations become pedagogues, using mass media and popular culture (such as television, films, and video games) to culturally socialize the postmodern child. In their introduction, "No More Secrets - Kinderculture, Information Saturation, and the Postmodern Child," the pair provide a name for this corporate construction of children's culture: kinderculture.

Steinberg and Kincheloe point out that corporations use various forms of kinderculture such as Barbie dolls, Disney movies, horror novels, and educational television programs "to inject their teachings into the fantasies, desires, and consumptive practices of contemporary children." Corporations recognize that children and parents have different tastes and "exploit" these differences in order to both make a profit and (re)produce targeted cultural images and ideologies.

The edited collection includes Steinberg's chapter, "The Bitch who has Everything," where she analyzes how Barbie and Mattel's messaging around Barbie impact young girls' lives.

Critics point out two shortcomings of Steinberg and Kincheloe's work: the (mostly) homogenous make-up of the collection's contributors and its bias toward an audience of teachers and parents of middle-class children. While many of the essays address the role race, class and gender play in the construction of kinderculture, they do not focus on how children of color/less-privileged children fit into this scheme of corporation consumption.

=== Post-Formalism ===
In 1993, Kincheloe and Steinberg revolutionized notions of cognition with their seminal article, A Tentative Description of Post-Formal Thinking: The Critical Confrontation with Cognitive Theory in the Harvard Education Review, drawing attention to the positivist assumptions made in much of concrete analyses in the work of Jean Piaget. In their 1996 work, Measured Lies: The Bell Curve Examined, Steinberg and Kincheloe write that "post-formal thinking about thinking involves our ability to engage in ideological disembedding, the ability to remove ourselves from socio-interpersonal norms and expectations...post-formal thinkers engage in a running meta-dialogue, a constant conversation with self." In 1999, Steinberg and Kincheloe teamed with Patricia H. Hinchey to write The Post-Formal Reader : Cognition and Education, and Steinberg and Kincheloe continued to develop this idea for the next several decades.

According to a review of post-formalism by Raymond A. Horn, Jr., he notes that post-formalism is explicated "in a four-part structure that includes etymology, pattern, process and contextualization." More generally, postformal inquiry looks at questions of meaning and purpose, multiple perspectives, human dignity, freedom, and social responsibility. Curriculum and instruction based on postformalism involve detecting problems, uncovering hidden assumptions, seeing relationships, deconstructing, connecting logic and emotion, and attending to context.

== Published works ==
Journal articles:

Books, authored:

- The Stigma of Genius: Einstein Consciousness and Critical Education 2nd Edition. (2021). New York: Peter Lang Publishing. (Shirley R. Steinberg, Joe L. Kincheloe and Edmund Adjapong, with Deborah J. Tippins).
- (2000) Contextualizing Teaching: Introduction to Education and Educational Foundations. New York, NY: Longman Publishing. (with Joe L. Kincheloe).
- (1999) The Stigma of Genius: Einstein, Consciousness and Education. New York, NY: Peter Lang. (with Joe L. Kincheloe and Deborah J. Tippins)
- (1997) Changing Multiculturalism: New Times, New Curriculum. Buckingham, UK: Open University Press. (with Joe L. Kincheloe)

Books, edited:

- (2018) Activists Under 30: Global Youth, Social Justice, and Good Work. Leiden, NL: Brill Sense Publishing.
- (2011) Kinderculture: The Corporate Construction of Childhood. Boulder, CO: Westview Press. [3rd ed.]
- (2010) 19 Urban Questions: Teaching in the City New York, NY: Peter Lang. [2nd ed.].
- (2009) Diversity and Multiculturalism: a Reader. New York, NY: Peter Lang.
- (2005) Teen Life in Europe. Westport, CT: Greenwood Press.
- (2001) Multi/intercultural Conversations : a Reader. New York, NY: Peter Lang.

Books, co-edited:

- (2020) A History of Progressive Music and Culture: Phishing in America. Written by Dennis Carlson, Edited by Shirley R. Steinberg. New York: Peter Lang.
- (2020) https://us.sagepub.com/en-us/nam/the-sage-handbook-of-critical-pedagogies/book257052 London, UK: Sage Publishing (with Barry Down). The Sage Handbook of Critical Pedagogies.
- (2018) Classroom Teaching: An Introduction 2nd Edition New York: NY: Peter Lang. (with Joe L. Kincheloe)
- (2016) Critically Researching Youth New York, NY: Peter Lang. (with Awad Ibrahim)
- (2016) The Curriculum: Decanonizing the Field New York, NY: Peter Lang. (with Joao Paraskeva)
- (2014) Critical Youth Studies Reader New York, NY: Peter Lang. (with Awad Ibrahim)
- (2012) Critical Qualitative Research Reader. New York, NY: Peter Lang. (with Gaile Sloan Cannella)
- (2010) Boy Culture: an Encyclopedia. Santa Barbara, CA: ABC Clio. (with Michael Kehler and Lindsay Cornish)
- (2010) Teaching Against Islamophobia. New York, NY: Peter Lang. (with Joe L. Kincheloe)
- (2009) Christotainment: Selling Jesus Through Popular Culture. Boulder, CO: Westview Press. (with Joe L. Kincheloe)
- (2007) Cutting Class: Socioeconomic Class and Education. Lanham, MD: Rowman and Littlefield. (with Joe L. Kincheloe)
- (2007) Media Literacy: a Reader. New York, NY: Peter Lang. (with Donaldo Macedo)
- (2006) Contemporary Youth Culture: an Encyclopedia. Westport, CT: Greenwood Press. (with Priya Parmar and Birgit Richard)
- (2006) What You Don't Know About Schools. New York, NY: Palgrave Macmillan. (with Joe L. Kincheloe)
- (2004) 19 Urban Questions: Teaching in the City. New York, NY: Peter Lang Publishing. (with Joe L. Kincheloe)
- (2004) Kinderculture: the Corporate Construction of Childhood. Boulder, CO: Westview Press. [2nd ed.] (with Joe L. Kincheloe)
- (2004) The Miseducation of the West: How Schools and the Media Distort Our Understanding of the Islamic World. Westport, CT: Praeger Press, (with Joe L. Kincheloe)
- (2000) Thinking Queer: Sexuality, Culture and Education. New York, NY: Peter Lang Publishing. (with Susan Talburt) *NOTE: Translated into Spanish
- (1999) The Post-Formal Reader: Cognition and Education. New York, NY: Falmer Press. (with Joe L. Kincheloe and Patricia Hinchey)
- (1998) White Reign: Deploying Whiteness in America. New York, NY: St. Martin's Press. (with Joe L. Kincheloe, Nelson Rodriguez, Ronald E. Chennault)
- (1998) Students as Researchers: Creating Classrooms that Matter. London, UK: Falmer Press. (with Joe L. Kincheloe) *NOTE: Translated into Chinese 2001
- (1998) Unauthorized Methods: Strategies for Critical Teaching. New York, NY: Routledge. (with Joe L. Kincheloe)
- (1997) Kinderculture: The Corporate Construction of Childhood. Boulder, CO: Westview Press. [1st ed.] (with Joe L. Kincheloe) *NOTE: Translated into Portuguese and Spanish
- (1996) Measured Lies: The Bell Curve Examined. New York, NY: St. Martin's Press. (with Joe L. Kincheloe and Aaron D. Gresson III)
- (1996) Thirteen Questions: Reframing Education's Conversation. New York, NY: Peter Lang. [2nd ed.] (with Joe L. Kincheloe)

== See also ==
- Joe L. Kincheloe
