= Mestre Ferradura =

Brazilian executive (born 1976)

- Omri Ferradura Breda
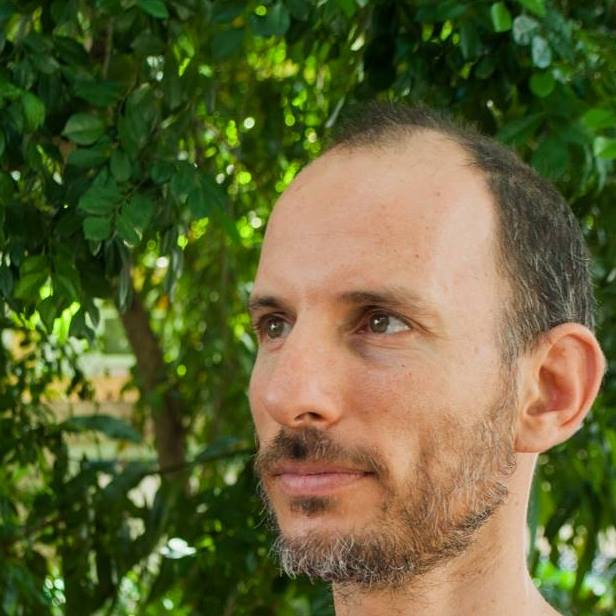
- Born: January 22, 1976 (age 50)
- Education: Universidade Federal do Estado do Rio de Janeiro
- Occupation: President of the Brazilian Capoeira-Education Institute Director of the Brincadeira de Angola Project

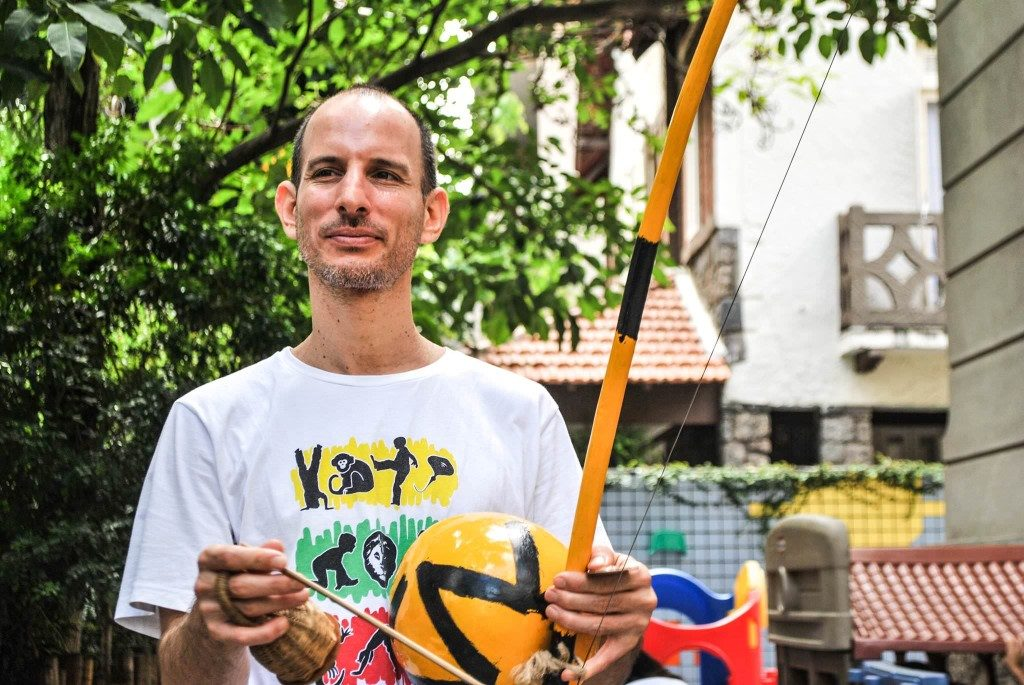
Mestre Ferradura in an early children education school.

Omri Ferradura Breda, commonly known as Mestre Ferradura (born January 22, 1976), is a Mestre de Capoeira, pedagogue, president of the Brazilian Institute of Capoeira Education, and director of the Brincadeira de Angola project.

== Biography ==
Mestre Ferradura started practicing Capoeira in 1991, at Rio de Janeiro, at Mestre Marrom's Capoeira Angola. He started teaching Capoeira in 1993. Mestre Ferradura received his graduation by the Capoeira Master Henrique Anastacio de Jesus, the Mestre Marrom, in 2010. He graduated in pedagogy from the Federal University of the State of Rio de Janeiro, and specialized in Early Childhood Education. He is the founder and coordinator of Brincadeira de Angola Project, which has the purpose of the playful teaching of capoeira applied to early childhood education. The Brazilian Institute of Capoeira Education, project which he's president, he helps teachers to understand the concepts of Capoeira Education.

=== Contributions to the Capoeira Education field ===
Mestre Ferradura possesses broad projection while defending the Brincadeira de Angola method, which is a pedagic-philosophic based on the educational potential, applying Capoeira as a transformative pedagogic practice in autonomous subjects formation, and deconstruction of racism through the valorization of the African roots. The basis of the methology is the ancestral knowledge of Capoeira, passed on from master to disciple in a traditional way. By balancing these popular and academic knowledge, the Brincadeira de Angola method suggest a Capoeira Pedagogy. Another contribution by Mestre Ferradura to the Capoeira community was the production of "Movimento Novo" (New Movement), along with Mestre Itapuã Beira-Mar, which brought discussions around the resulting violence from the contact of Capoeirists from different schools and proposes a pacific interaction to the new generations.

== Research and academic production ==
In the past decade, Mestre Ferradura has acted in the formation of teacher and promoting his pedagogic methodology in Brazil and Europe. His influences include Paulo Freire, Muniz Sodré, Marshall Rosemberg, Emília Viotti da Costa, Elisa Larkin Nascimento, Thomas E. Skidmore, Nestor Capoeira, Michel Foucalt, A.S. Neil, Terry Orlick, and Peter Slade. In his academic outreach, Mestre Ferradura travels and joins a number of formation programs and training of teachers and mestres in Brazilian and international Universities. Among the institutions which his courses and symposia have been ministrated, are included UFRR, UFBA, USP, and Museu da República.

His most notable articles are:

- Capoeira as a transformative educational practive (2010)
- Capoeira as pedagogic practice in early childhood education (2015)
- Capoeira as a libertarian education for the formation of autonomous subjects - the teaching practices in Rio de Janeiro's Rodas de Rua (2019)
- Brazilian racial ideology: the subjacent racism in comics magazines (2015)

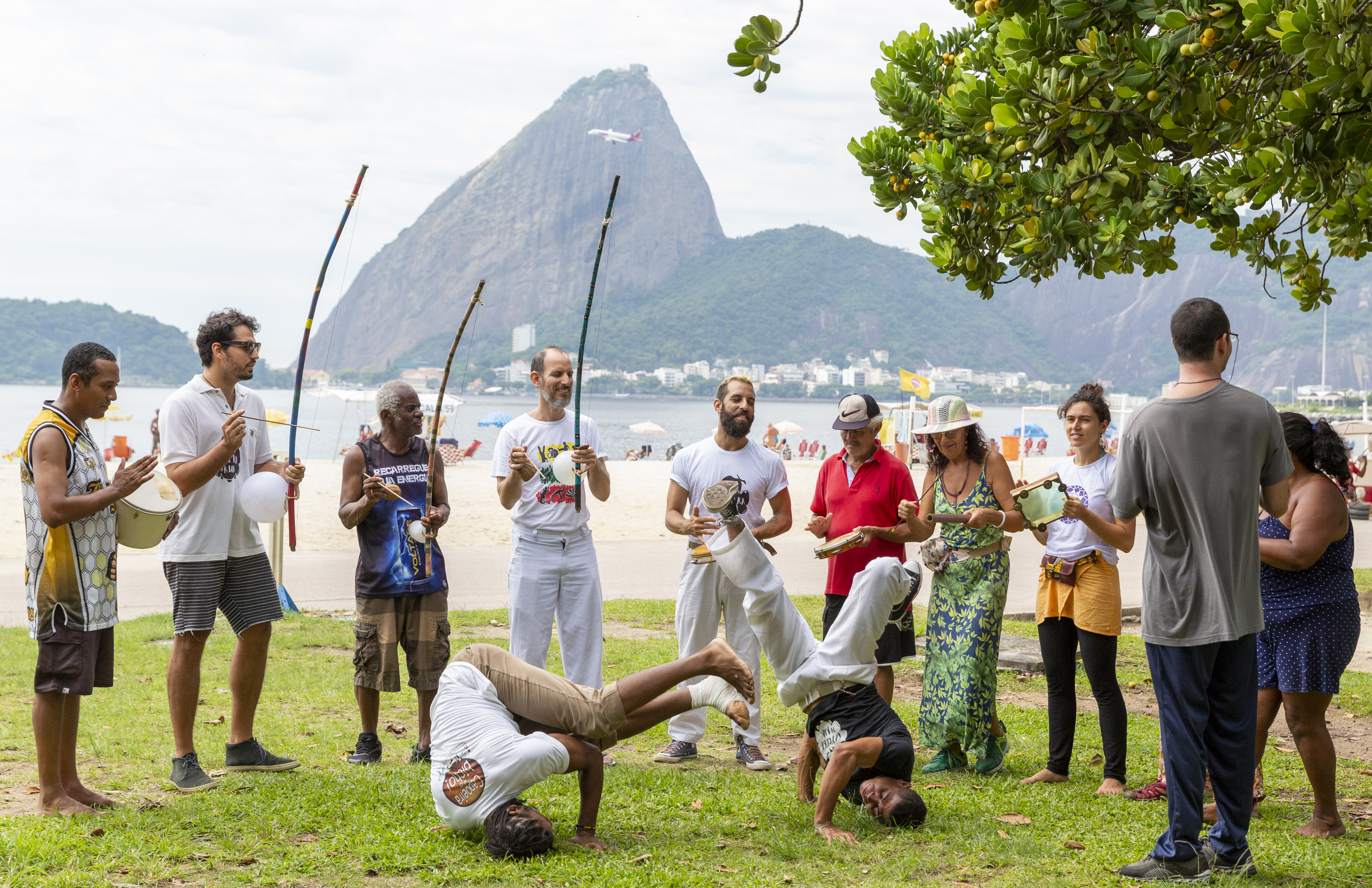
Mestre Ferradura conducting a circle of Capoeira de Rua.

His works are academic references in authors of varied fields of pedagogy and studies in the African matrix, influencing and being cited in a series of monographies in Brasil.

== Social action ==
Mestre Ferradura's participations in social action includes occasional participation in activities of the Third Sector to regular governamental projects, such as:

When we bring Capoeira de Rua for them, is a bit of culture and visibility. At the same time, we bring the idea of social circle, the look eye-in-the-eye, the care, the shelter, the belonging, and the knowledge that in that circle, you are just one capoeirist.

— Mestre Ferradura, in an interview to Brazilian news program "Balanço Geral", in December, 2019. [27]

Homeless people goes through a process of invisibilization. At Capeoira, we have necessarily to look at each other, interact, touch, know a bit of our feelings and needs of each other. The student's self-esteem is enhanced when he's seen, when he's heard, in his most basic needs of care, shelter, and belonging.

— Mestre Ferradura, in interview to Rede Globo, in August, 2019. [28]
- At the Benjamin Constant Institute, with a project of educating Capoeira to blind children
- At DEGASE, with institutionalized teenagers serving socio-educational measures
- The Capoeira de Rua, with homeless people
- The Brazilian Capoeira-Education Institute for the Peace, in partnership with Gingando Pela Paz, UNESCO, and Viva Rio

== Artistic contributions ==
In the artistic fields, Mestre Ferradura has worked in a variety of direction of Capoeira, like:

- Intrépida Trupe, in the Kronos show, having participated in the front commission of Mocidade Independente de Padre Miguel, which won the Tamborim de Ouro Award in 1999.
- With Paola Barreto Leblanc, when signed the direction of Capoeira and writing the script of the "Maré Capoeira" movie.
- With João Falcão, director of "Ópera do Malandro", when he did body conditioning of the troupe at Theatro Municipal do Rio de Janeiro.
