= Joe L. Kincheloe =

American academic (1950–2008)

- Born: December 14, 1950; Kingsport, Tennessee, U.S.
- Died: December 19, 2008 (aged 58); Kingston, Jamaica
- Education: University of Tennessee
- Known for: Concept of an evolving Critical Theory/Critical Pedagogy; Theory of Critical Post-Formal Educational Psychology; Theory of Critical Multiculturalism; Critical Bricolage; Critical Ontology; Critical Complex Epistemology
- Scientific career
- Fields: Radical education, critical pedagogy, critical educational research, bricolage, urban education, cognition, curriculum, cultural studies
- Workplaces: McGill University, CUNY Graduate Center, Brooklyn College, Pennsylvania State University, Florida International University, Clemson University, Louisiana State University in Shreveport, Sinte Gleska College

Joe Lyons Kincheloe (December 14, 1950 – December 19, 2008) was a professor and Canada Research Chair at the Faculty of Education, McGill University in Montreal and founder of The Paulo and Nita Freire International Project for Critical Pedagogy. He wrote more than 45 books, numerous book chapters, and hundreds of journal articles on issues including critical pedagogy, educational research, urban studies, cognition, curriculum, and cultural studies. Kincheloe received three graduate degrees from the University of Tennessee. The father of four children, he worked closely for the last 19 years of his life with his partner, Shirley R. Steinberg.

== Academic ==
Joe Kincheloe's first academic position was on the Rosebud Indian Reservation as the department chair of education at Sinte Gleska College (1980–1982). He was tenured at LSU-Shreveport (1982–1989), Clemson University (1989–1992), Florida International University (1992–1994), Pennsylvania State University (1994–1998), and was the Belle Zeller Chair of Public Policy and Administration from 1998 to 2000 at Brooklyn College. Kincheloe co-authored the Urban Education Ph.D. program at the CUNY Graduate Center in New York and served as Deputy Executive Program Officer there from 2000 to 2005. He moved to McGill University in January 2006 and received the first Canada Research Chair of Critical Pedagogy in October 2006.

== Major influences ==
Kincheloe's work drew from a number of theoretical traditions, and his analyzes focused on the social, cultural, political, economic, and cognitive dynamics that contextualize teaching and learning. Dr. Kincheloe's research provided a compelling understanding of the forces shaping contemporary education. Understanding these dynamics, educators are better equipped to formulate policies and develop actions that rigorously cultivate the intellect while operating in a more socially just and inclusive manner. He and Steinberg spoke about critical pedagogy and cultural/media politics in North America, South America, Australia, Europe, and Asia.

== Project for Critical Pedagogy ==
Kincheloe founded The Paulo and Nita Freire International Project for Critical Pedagogy with Shirley R. Steinberg at the Faculty of Education, McGill University. Following Kincheloe's death, the Freire Project continued as a virtual network: freireproject.org maintained and directed by Steinberg, creating a global community of researchers and cultural workers in critical pedagogy and cultural engagement. Kincheloe is considered one of the leading scholars in critical pedagogy, critical constructivism, the research bricolage conceived with Shirley R. Steinberg, critical multicultural education, and contemporary curriculum discourses. He is the architect of a critical cognitive theory, having developed the notion of a critical postformal educational psychology. Postformalism focuses on exposing the unexamined power relations that shape cognitive theory and educational psychology in a larger liberatory effort to develop a psychology of possibility. Such a critical psychology focuses on typically underestimated human cognitive capacities, the socio-cultural construction of mind, collective intelligence, and the unexplored dimensions of human cognition. Postformalism posits that mainstream psychology has historically dismissed the cognitive abilities of those who fall outside of whiteness, the middle and upper socio-economic classes, dominant colonizing cultures, and patriarchy. In this context, critical postformalism becomes a socially transformative psychology.

== Impact ==
Central to Kincheloe's work in all of these areas is the construction of a rigorous form of multidimensional scholarship that draws upon critical theory, critical pedagogy, feminist theory, complexity theory, indigenous knowledges, post/anti-colonialism, and other global discourses to help end dominant power-constructed human suffering. In his work over the last few years Kincheloe has focused much attention on the politics of knowledge and epistemology and the diverse ways they operate to shape human consciousness and socio-political and educational activities. He was dedicated to creating a critical pedagogy that helps individuals reshape their lives, become better scholars and social activists, realize their cognitive potential, re-create democratic spaces in an electronically mediated global world, and build and become members of communities of solidarity that work to create better modes of education and a more peaceful, equitable, and ecologically sustainable world.

As educational scholar, Rucheeta Kulkarni (2008) writes: "With an authorial voice that blends conversational simplicity with visionary philosophy, Joe Kincheloe [outlines] the deepening crises of this nation's actions at home and abroad—including preemptive wars against imagined enemies, scripted curricula for deprofessionalized teachers, privatization of public schools, and corporate ownership of the news media—he tells the reader not to despair but to hope...For any reader who aspires to do meaningful and transformative knowledge work, it is hard to refuse Kincheloe's invitation into the ideas of critical pedagogy."

See Raymond Horn (1999) for a comprehensive overview of Kincheloe's scholarship in the 1980s and 1990s.

== Bibliography ==
Authored

- Kincheloe, Joe L (2008). Critical Pedagogy Primer 2nd edition. English: New York, New York: Peter Lang. ISBN 978-1-4331-0182-3
- Kincheloe, Joe L (2008). Knowledge and Critical Pedagogy: An Introduction. Dordrecht, London: Springer. ISBN 978-1-4020-8223-8. OCLC 192027689.
- Kincheloe, Joe L (2005). Critical constructivism primer. New York: Peter Lang. ISBN 978-0-8204-7616-2. OCLC 57344185.
- Critical Pedagogy Primer. (2004). New York City: Peter Lang. (2nd edition, 2008).
- Kincheloe, Joe L (2002). The sign of the burger: McDonald's and the culture of power. Philadelphia: Temple University Press. ISBN 978-1-56639-931-9. OCLC 47140812.
- Teachers as Researchers: Qualitative Paths to Empowerment, 2nd Edition. (2002). New York: RoutledgeFalmer.
- Getting Beyond the Facts: Teaching Social Studies/Social Sciences in the Twenty-First Century. (2001). New York: Peter Lang Publishing.
- Hacia una Revision Critica del Pensamiento Docente. (2001). Barcelona: Ocaedro.
- How Do We Tell the Workers? The Socio-Economic Foundations of Work and Vocational Education. (1999). Boulder, Colorado: Westview Press.

Co-authored

- The Stigma of Genius: Einstein Consciousness and Critical Education 2nd Edition. (2021). New York: Peter Lang Publishing. (Shirley R. Steinberg, Joe L. Kincheloe and Edmund Adjapong, with Deborah J. Tippins).
- Reading, Writing, and Thinking: The Postformal Basics. (2006). Rotterdam: Sense Publishers. (with P.L. Thomas).
- Rigour and Complexity in Educational Research: Conceptualizing the Bricolage. (2004). London: Open University Press. (with Kathleen Berry) (Portuguese Edition, 2005)
- Art, Culture, & Education: Artful Teaching in a Fractured Landscape. (2003). New York: Peter Lang Publishing. (with Karel Rose)
- Contextualizing Teaching: Introduction to the Foundations of Education. (2000). New York: Allan & Bacon. Longman. (with Shirley R. Steinberg)
- The Stigma of Genius: Einstein, Consciousness and Education. (1999). New York: Peter Lang Publishing. (with Deborah Tippins and Shirley R. Steinberg)
- Changing Multiculturalism: New Times, New Curriculum. (1997). London: Open University Press. (with Shirley R. Steinberg).

Edited

- Classroom Teaching: An Introduction 2nd Edition. (2018). New York: Peter Lang Publishing. (with Shirley R. Steinberg).
- Classroom Teaching: An Introduction. (2005). New York: Peter Lang Publishing.
- Multiple Intelligences Reconsidered. (2004). New York: Peter Lang Publishing. (Chinese Edition 2005).

Co-edited

- Christotainment: Selling Jesus Through Popular Culture. (2009). Boulder, Colorado: Westview Press. (with Shirley R. Steinberg)
- Cutting Class: Socio-economic Class and Education. (2007). Lanham, Maryland: Rowman and Littlefield. (with Shirley R. Steinberg)
- Critical Pedagogy: Where Are We Now? (2007). New York: Peter Lang Publishing. (with Peter McLaren)
- Doing Educational Research. (2006). Rotterdam: Sense Publishers. (with Kenneth Tobin)
- Teaching City Kids: Understanding Them and Appreciating Them. (2006). New York: Peter Lang Publishing. (with Kecia Hayes)
- Urban Education: An Encyclopedia. (2006). 2 volumes. Westport, Connecticut: Greenwood Press. (with Philip Anderson, Kecia Hayes and Karel Rose). Rights bought by Rowman and Littlefield for 2nd edition: (2007) Urban Education: A Comprehensive Guide for Educators, Parents, and Teachers. Lanham, Maryland: Rowman and Littlefield.
- Educational Psychology: An Encyclopedia. (2006). 4 vols. Westport, Connecticut: Greenwood Press. (with Raymond Horn).
- Metropedagogy: Power, Justice and the Urban Classroom. (2006). Rotterdam, The Netherlands: Sense Publishers.
- What You Don't Know about Schools. (2006). New York: Palgrave Press. (with Shirley R. Steinberg)
- The Miseducation of the West: How the Schools and Media Distort Our Understanding of Islam. (2004). Westport, Connecticut: Praeger Press. (Arabic Edition, 2005) (with Shirley R. Steinberg).
- American Standards: Quality Education in a Complex World—The Texas Case. (2001). New York: Peter Lang Publishing. (with Raymond Horn).

== Sources ==
- Appelbaum, B. (1999). Review of Joe Kincheloe, Shirley R. Steinberg, Nelson Rodriguez, and Ronald Chennault's White Reign: Deploying Whiteness in America. Educational Review: A Journal of Book Reviews. https://web.archive.org/web/20110724184016/http://www.edrev.info/reviews/rev46.htm
- Aumeerally, N. (2006). Review of Joe L. Kincheloe and Shirley R. Steinberg's]] The Miseducation of the West: How Schools and the Media Distort Our Understanding of the Islamic World. Comparative Education Review, 50, 3.
- Bigger, S. (1998). Review of Joe L. Kincheloe and Shirley R. Steinberg's Changing Multiculturalism. Westminster Studies in Education. http://eprints.worc.ac.uk/242/1/Kincheloe&Steinberg.pdf.
- Blake, J. (2008). Review of Joe L. Kincheloe's Critical Constructivism. Educational Review: A Journal of Book Reviews. https://web.archive.org/web/20110724184102/http://www.edrev.info/reviews/rev660.htm
- Blake, N. (2004). Review of Joe L. Kincheloe and Shirley R. Steinberg's Students as Researchers: Creating Classrooms that Matter. Teaching Theology & Religion, 4, 1, 55–62.
- Broadfoot, P. (1998). Review of Joe L. Kincheloe, Shirley R. Steinberg, and Aaron D. Gresson III's Measured Lies: The Bell Curve Examined. Comparative Education Review, 42, 3, 372-374
- Horn, R. (1999). "Joe L. Kincheloe: Teacher as Researcher." Educational Researcher, 28, 4.
- King, D. (2006). A Cultural Studies Approach to Teaching the Sociology of Childhood. Sociation Today. 4, 1.
- Kirylo, J. D. (2011). Paulo Freire: The Man from Recife. New York: Peter Lang.
- Knobel, M. (2004). Review of Shirley Steinberg and Joe Kincheloe's 19 Urban Questions: Teaching in the city. Educational Review: A Journal of Book Reviews. https://web.archive.org/web/20110809213124/http://www.edrev.info/reviews/rev264.htm
- Kulkarni, R. (2008). Review of Joe L. Kincheloe's Critical Pedagogy. 2nd edition. Educational Review: A Journal of Book Reviews. https://web.archive.org/web/20120722143108/http://www.edrev.info/reviews/rev721.htm
- Leech, N. (2007). Research and the "Inner Circle": The Need to Set Aside Counterproductive Language. Educational Researcher, 36, 4, 199–203.
- Lincoln, Y. (2001). An Emerging New Bricoleur: Promises and Possibilities (A Reaction to Joe Kincheloe's "Describing the Bricoleur"). Qualitative Inquiry, 7, 6, 693–705.
- Nayar, P. (2006). Review of Joe L. Kincheloe's Sign of the Burger: McDonald's and the Culture of Power. Anthropology of Work Review. 27, 2. http://onlinelibrary.wiley.com/doi/10.1525/awr.2006.27.2.24/full
- Nesbit, T. (2000). Review of Joe L. Kincheloe's How Do We Tell the Workers? The Socioeconomic Foundations of Work and Vocational Education. Labor Studies Journal, 25, pages 125–26.
- Oakes, E. (2006). Review of Shirley R. Steinberg & Joe L. Kincheloe's Kinderculture: The Corporate Construction of Childhood. 2nd Edition. College Literature, 33, 3, 212–216.
- Pigza, J. (2005). Review of Joe L. Kincheloe's Critical Pedagogy. Educational Review: A Journal of Book Reviews. https://web.archive.org/web/20110724184141/http://www.edrev.info/reviews/rev364.htm
- Rumbo, J. (2004). Examining Relationships between Consumption, Nature, and Culture. Review of Joe Kincheloe's The Sign of the Burger: McDonald's and the Culture of Power. Journal of Contemporary Ethnography, 33, 2, pages 218–230.
- Sew, J.W. (2006) Review of Joe L. Kincheloe's Multiple Intelligences Reconsidered. Discourse in Society, 17, 4, 554-557
- Urban, W. (1992). Rejoinder to Joe Kincheloe. Curriculum Inquiry, 22, 4, pages 447–448.
