= Pedagogy of Hope =

Book written by Paulo Freire

- Author: Paulo Freire

Pedagogy of Hope: Reliving Pedagogy of the Oppressed (Portuguese: Pedagogia da Esperança: Um reencontro com a Pedagogia do Oprimido) is a 1992 book written by Paulo Freire that contains his reflections and elaborations on his previous book Pedagogy of the Oppressed, with a focus on hope. It was first published in Portuguese in 1992 and was translated into English in 1994 by Robert Barr, with notes from Freire's widow Ana Maria Araújo Freire.

== Summary ==
Pedagogy of Hope is broken up into seven chapters, along with an "Opening Words" section and an "Afterwards". In the book, Freire offers his reflections on the thinking behind Pedagogy of the Oppressed. Unlike in his previous book, Freire centralizes the theme of hope and introduces it as an "ontological need". He notes that although hope alone is not enough to achieve liberation, without hope there is no struggle at all. Freire emphasizes the importance of the relationship between educators and students and continues to fight against the banking model of education.

In the "Afterwards", Ana Maria Araújo Freire reflects on her husband's work, and concludes by introducing the triangle of her reading of the world: "prohibition, liberation, and hope".

== Critical reception ==
Scholar Timothy D. Ireland argues that Freire does not offer anything new in Pedagogy of Hope; rather, he argues, the merit of the book is Freire's willingness to expound and clarify his work. Denis Collins offers a similar view, noting that he could not identify new concerns or theories put forward by Freire. Mary Ellen Sullivan asserts that Freire has an almost stream of consciousness style of writing, making the translation "awkward [and] literal". Conversely, Sarah Hendriks argues that "Freire's dialogical method of writing, as if he were letting us read the very pages of his personal diary, captivates his audience and thus his message becomes personally applicable to our own lives and practice of education". Hendriks also critiques Freire's concept of "unity in diversity", noting that it is overly focused on class struggle and does not acknowledge how people can be victims of multiple forms of oppression at the same time.

Sullivan also asserts that Freire is: "Uncompromisingly on the side of oppressed peoples everywhere, Freire promotes his philosophically dense ideas with the fervor of a revolutionary.” Additionally, Collins makes a point to acknowledge that Freire "makes profound apologies for apparent sexism in his earlier writings". Shelli B. Fowler contends that Freire promoted teaching as acts of creativity—acts that should always be critical and never be mechanical. She also asserts that one of Freire's most fundamental points was that teachers need to teach students how to teach themselves.
