= Culture circle =

Classroom methodology

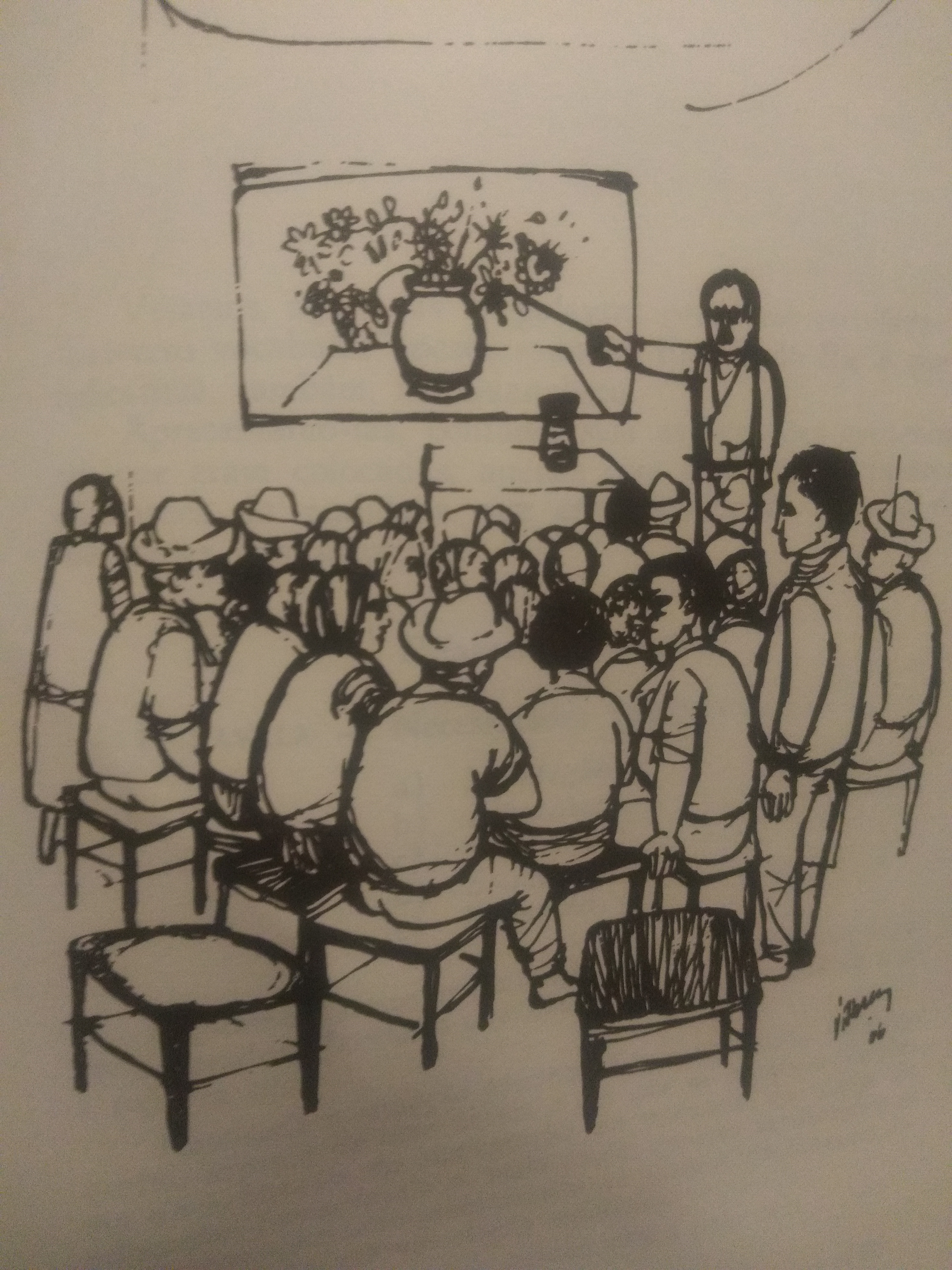
Depiction of a culture circle, a methodology by Paulo Freire as depicted on the book Educação Como Pratica da Liberdade

Culture circles were a classroom methodology developed by Brazilian educator Paulo Freire for adult literacy, especially for agricultural laborers. Freire took part in these classrooms during the 1960s, prior to the military coup, and later in Chile while in exile. He chose this name for his classrooms for the following reasons:

1. To avoid using the term "literacy classrooms," a term that may be deemed derogatory and more related to what Freire described as a banking educational model.
2. Beyond learning to read and write, culture circles seek to develop critical consciousness through cooperative research.

== See also ==
- Critical pedagogy
