= Álvaro Vieira Pinto =

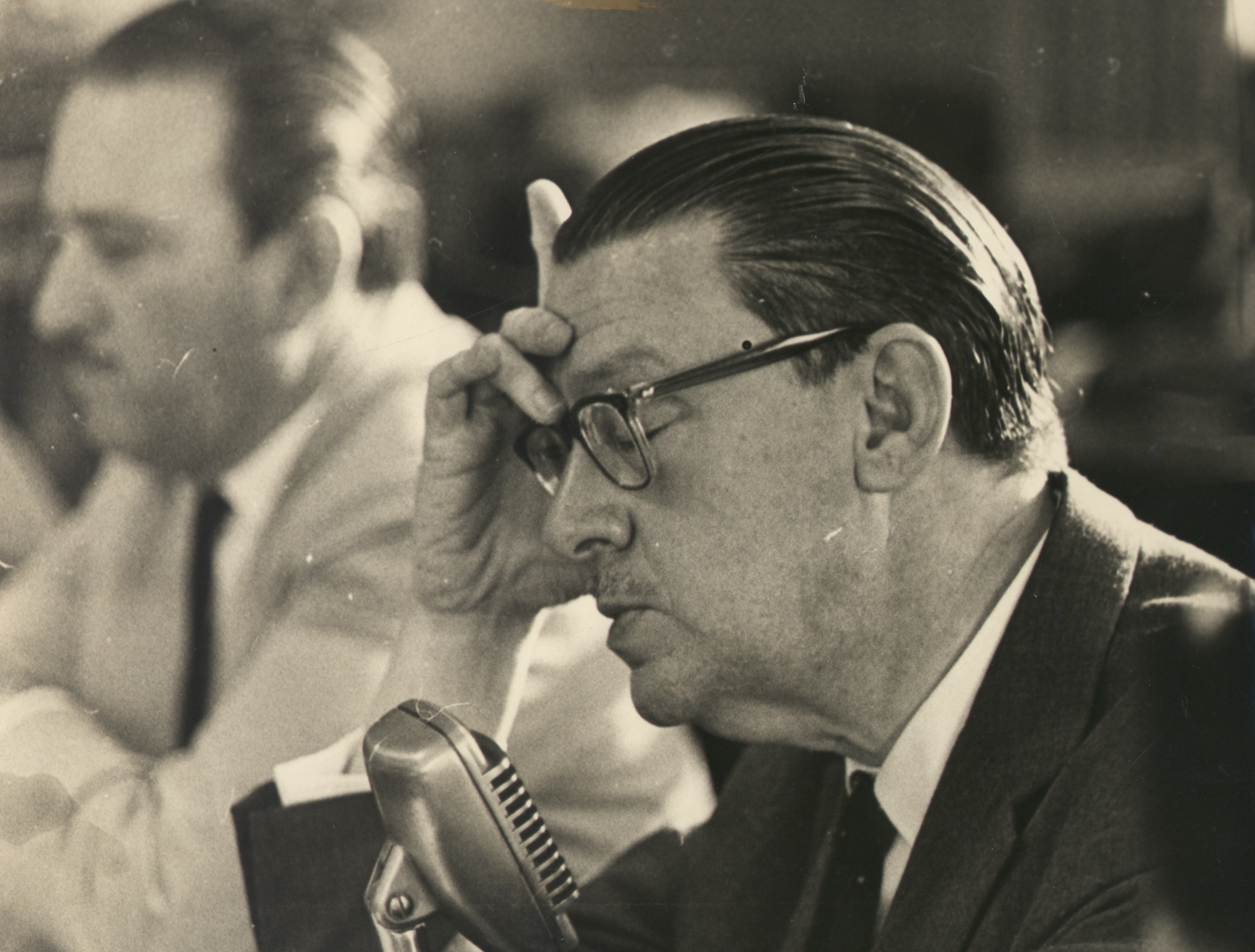

Álvaro Borges Vieira Pinto (11 November 1909 – 11 June 1987) was a Brazilian intellectual, philosopher and translator.

Pinto was born in Campos dos Goytacazes in 1909. He is well known for his nationalism and his defense of the autonomous development of Brazil. His research addressed education, medicine, mathematics, demography, physics, technology and others. The educator Paulo Freire called him mestre brasileiro, 'the Brazilian master'. His philosophy centered on the concept of 'work', which he understood to be an essential aspect of the human being.

Pinto died in Rio de Janeiro in 1987.

== Works ==
- Ideologia e desenvolvimento nacional (1956)
- Consciência e realidade nacional [2 volumes] (1960-1961)
- A questão da universidade (1961)
- Por que os ricos não fazem greve? (1962)
- Ciência e existência: problemas filosóficos da pesquisa científica (1969)
- El pensamiento crítico en demografia [español] (1973)
- Sete lições sobre educação de adultos (1982)
- O conceito de tecnologia [2 volumes] (2005)
- A sociologia dos países subdesenvolvidos (2008)

== See also ==
- Underdevelopment
