= Ana Mae Barbosa =

Brazilian art educator, researcher, and academic

- Born: July 17, 1936 (age 90); Rio de Janeiro, Brazil
- Citizenship: Brazilian
- Occupations: pedagogue, university professor
- Employer(s): University of São Paulo; Armando Álvares Penteado Foundation; School of Communications and Arts of the University of São Paulo
- Known for: Art education
- Awards: National Order of Scientific Merit (Brazil); Ordem do Mérito Cultural (2016); Prêmio Jabuti (2016)

Academic background
- Education: Federal University of Pernambuco

Ana Mae Barbosa, Ana Mae Tavares Bastos Barbosa or still Anna Mae Tavares Bastos Barbosa (born July 17, 1936) is a professor, art educator, researcher and pioneer in postgraduate education in art teaching. In 2022, she received the award of professor emeritus from the University of São Paulo. She is the first Latin American to preside over the International Society for Education through Art (InSEA), an entity that brings together experts from around the world. She was also director of the Museum of Contemporary Art, University of São Paulo (MAC-USP).

Her trajectory was influenced by figures such as Paulo Freire and Noemia Varela, who were responsible for transforming her ways of thinking about education and art.

Ana Mae was part of the Escolinhas de Arte Movement (English free translation: Little Art Schools), initiated in the 1940s in Brazil and operating outside the public education system, which aimed to research new parameters for art education, guided by freedom of expression and considering the relevance of art in the educational process and in the formation of individuals.

In the 1980s, she systematized the Triangular Approach, a pedagogical proposal based on three axes for knowledge in art: reading (reading a work of art), making (making art) and contextualizing (knowing the context of the work).

Her works are frequently cited in studies on art education in Brazil.

== Career ==
She was born in the state of Rio de Janeiro, but moved to Recife at the age of three due to the premature death of her father. At the age of six, with the death of her mother, she went to live in Alagoas with her maternal grandparents, who were responsible for her upbringing.

In 1954, she enrolled as a student at the Instituto Capibaribe, in the preparatory course for the primary school teachers' entrance exam of the Pernambuco Education Secretariat. There she was a student of Paulo Freire and Noemia Varela, decisive influences in her professional trajectory. Noemia Varela was an important figure for Ana Mae's choice of visual arts, as the teacher, responsible for art education classes, created conditions for her to experience this form of expression as an aesthetic experience.

Paulo Freire was responsible for transforming her thinking about education and became a friend of the researcher. In her words:

Paulo convinced me that education was a form of liberation. He took me to the Escolinha de Arte in Recife — the Escolinha de Arte of Brazil, created in the 1950s, by the Pernambuco artist Augusto Rodrigues — and I became more and more involved with the area. Paulo was a great mentor and friend.

— Ana Mae Barbosa

In 1958, she began working in art education with children and adolescents at the Recife Escolinha de Arte, directed by Noemia Varela. In 1960, she graduated as a bachelor in Law and Social Sciences from the Federal University of Pernambuco Recife School of Law (Federal University of Pernambuco (UFPE)). She reports that this was the most oppressive experience in her academic background, because:

In a class of two hundred men, we women, only six, had to fight, each in her own way, without any awareness of the need for unity, against the intellectual disqualification we suffered from our professors and also from our colleagues. Only three of us survived professionally. — Ana Mae Barbosa

For Ana Mae Barbosa, the oppressive experience was a propellant for her engagement in the process of liberating others through education. In 1964, the University of Brasília invited the art educator to organize an escolinha de artes, which opened in 1965, with the objective of serving children and adolescents, offering courses to teachers and promoting research in art education that would contribute to building a scientific character in this area of knowledge.

She was married to João Alexandre Barbosa. She moved to the United States in 1971 with her children Frederico and Ana Amália, then aged ten and five respectively, and her husband, who received a scholarship to study at Yale University. Although she applied for a scholarship from CAPES to pursue her master's degree in art education in this country, Ana did not obtain the study grant. Since this was an unknown area of teacher training programs in Brazil at the time, the institution denied the scholarship. However, at a Yale University event, she met a Portuguese professor who invited her to teach at the institution in the area of Brazilian culture, an experience that took place in 1972 and enabled her to pay for her master's degree, which she began that same year at the University of Connecticut.

In 1974, Ana Mae Barbosa completed her master's degree, under the supervision of George Harrington, with the dissertation The Teaching of Visual Arts in Primary and Secondary Schools in Brazil. (Note: In Portuguese: O ensino das Artes visuais em escolas de primeiro e segundo grau no Brasil.)

In 1979, she completed her PhD in Humanistic Education at Boston University, supervised by Richard Rapacz, defending the thesis American Influence on Brazilian Art Education in Brazil: Analysis of Two Moments (Walter Smith and John Dewey), which addresses American influence on art teaching in Brazil and makes her the first Brazilian PhD in art education.

In 1982, she became a visiting professor at the School of Art Education of Birmingham Polytechnic, England. In 1990, at the School of Communications and Arts (ECA) of the University of São Paulo (USP), she defended her thesis entitled Arte na Educação: Anos 80 e Novos Tempos, which analyzes the conceptual and political situation of art teaching in Brazil in the 1980s. The work highlights teaching methodologies that take art as culture and not simply as expression. The work was published as a book in 1991 with the title A Imagem no Ensino da Arte: Anos Oitenta e Novos Tempos.

=== Teaching and research in higher education ===
In 1973, Ana began teaching at the Armando Álvares Penteado Foundation (FAAP) and, in 1974, at ECA-USP, contributing to the training of several generations of researchers and scholars on the most diverse themes in the area of art education. At ECA, she created the country's first postgraduate program in art education, supervising dozens of master's, doctorate and postdoctoral studies.

In 1980, she conceived and organized the Week of Art and Teaching, held from September 15 to 19, 1980, at ECA-USP. It was the first event around art education held in Brazil and featured the participation of about 3,000 educators in plenary sessions with the participation of Walter Zanini, Aloísio Magalhães, Noemia Varela and Paulo Freire. She created, together with Regina Stela Barcelos Machado, the specialization course in art education at ECA-USP, which was active from 1984 to 2001.

From 1987 to 1993, she was director of the Museum of Contemporary Art, University of São Paulo (MAC-USP). During her management, various exhibitions and ateliers were held based on the ideal of transforming it into a democratic and open space for all audiences. She turned to the systematization of art teaching in museums and her work impacted the educational sector of this and other museums in Brazil.

From 1991 to 1993, she presided over the International Society for Education through Art (InSEA), an entity that brings together experts from around the world. Ana Mae was the first Latin American, and the only one until 2023, to preside over the institution. In 1997, she taught at Ohio State University, in the United States.

In 2018, she received the title of honoris causa professor from the Federal University of Pernambuco (UFPE) and, in 2022, she received the title of emeritus professor from ECA-USP.

=== Escolinhas de Arte Movement ===
The Escolinhas de Arte Movement (fre translation: Little Art Schools) emerged in the early 1940s, focusing on researching new parameters for art education and based on freedom of expression. It was directly influenced by the New Education Movement, the concepts of art education developed by Franz Cizek (1865–1946), and also the theories of Herbert Read (1893–1968), present in the book Education through Art (1943). The Escolinha de Arte of Brazil (EAB) is the first school of the movement, founded in 1948, in Rio de Janeiro. Ana Mae Barbosa is among the prominent figures of the movement. In 1948, in Rio de Janeiro, the EAB was founded, from a perspective of non-formal education that started a movement across the country. It offered innovative experiences in childhood in a context where art teaching was not mandatory in schools. She pointed out that the Escolinha de Arte was the university of art education, since there were no higher education courses specifically for training art teachers.

Ana graduated from the Recife Art Little School in 1953, where she also worked as an intern, teacher and director between 1958 and 1966. She participated in the organization of the Art Little School in Brasília in 1965, and in the organization of the São Paulo Art Little School (EASP), in 1968.

Operating outside the public education system, the Art Little Schools integrated a movement that sought to recreate education, emphasizing the relevance of art in the educational process and in the formation of the individual. Art was taken as a pedagogical resource for the expression of individuals, and not as a symbol of distinction and refinement destined for people from upper social classes. The Movement was essential for rethinking art education according to the development of people and society, and although it began and developed outside the formal education system, it had a profound impact on it.

=== Triangular Approach ===
The Triangular Approach, initially called Triangular Methodology, to art teaching was systematized in the late 1980s by Ana Mae Barbosa, based on the epistemological approaches of British Critical Studies, American Discipline-Based Art Education (DBAE), and Mexican Escuelas Al Aire Libre. She uses the term "systematized" to refer to the Triangular Approach, as she states that such denomination — Triangular Approach — was implicit in the postmodern condition.

It involves a pedagogical proposal structured around three axes for knowledge in art: reading (reading a work of art), making (making art) and contextualizing (knowing the context of the work). In art education, the Triangular Approach indicates that knowledge in art occurs at the intersection between experimentation, information and decoding, therefore, through the interrelationship between reading, artistic making and art history, activities constitutive of the epistemology of art.

The approach enables an interaction between parts and whole and vice versa, that is, not only between art disciplines, but also between other disciplines of the school curriculum. In this approach, there is no established order for exploring the three vertices in the pedagogical process, with the condition that all are contemplated in an articulated manner.

The Triangular Approach is a reference to transformations in art teaching in Brazil and emerges amid the need for a postmodern art teaching practice, at a time when Brazil was emerging from the dictatorial period. Until then, in the Brazilian school environment, there was no contact of the student with images of artworks, nor with their historical contextualization; the focus of classes was free expression and drawing worked in a geometric way, without concerns about understanding and applicability.

The first educational program based on the Triangular Approach was developed by Ana Mae Barbosa in 1987 at the Museum of Contemporary Art, University of São Paulo (MAC-USP), when she was director. The Triangular Approach served as an influence for the National Curricular Parameters for Art in elementary school and high school in Brazil, established in 1997, without being explicitly announced. Mae indicates that, since its emergence, this approach has been subject to transformations from the recreative action of educators and researchers. For her, the metaphor of the triangle no longer corresponds to its structure, being more appropriate to represent it by the figure of a zigzag, given that teachers have taught that the process can occur through different paths, and not only by the ordering of the vertices of the triangle.

In 2022, she developed and coordinated, together with Sidiney Peterson Lima, and with a team of art educators, the course Abordagem Triangular e o Ensino de Arte na Educação Infantil, launched by the Sesc Digital platform. The course consists of six lessons and aims to reflect on working in the field of visual arts with children aged 3 to 5 years, and how they relate to images, as well as their forms of fruition and expression.

== Selected works ==
The following are some of her authored works:

- 2019: Mulheres Não Devem Ficar em Silêncio: Arte, Design, Educação — edited by Ana Mae Barbosa and Vitória Amaral (Cortez)
- 2015: Redesenhando o Desenho: Educadores, Política e História (Cortez)
- 2010: Abordagem Triangular no Ensino das Artes e Culturas Visuais — edited by Ana Mae Barbosa and Fernanda Pereira da Cunha (Cortez)
- 2008: Ensino da Arte: Memória e História (Perspectiva)
- 2006: Arte/Educação Contemporânea: Consonâncias Internacionais (Cortez)
- 2005: O Pós-Modernismo — with Jacó Guinsburg (Perspectiva)
- 2002: Alex Flemming (Edusp)
- 2002: Inquietações e Mudanças no Ensino da Arte (Cortez)
- 1998: Tópicos Utópicos (C/Arte)
- 1997: Arte-Educação: Leitura no Subsolo — edited by Ana Mae Barbosa (Cortez)
- 1991: A Imagem do Ensino da Arte: anos oitenta e novos tempos (Perspectiva)
- 1986: História da Arte-Educação — edited by Ana Mae Barbosa (Max Limonad)
- 1984: Arte-educação: Conflitos/Acertos (Max Limonad)
- 1982: Recorte e Colagem: Influências de John Dewey no Ensino da arte no Brasil (Autores Associados e Cortez)
- 1978: Arte-educação no Brasil: das Origens ao Modernismo (Perspectiva)
- 1975: Teoria e Prática da Educação Artística

== Awards and honors ==
Throughout her career, Ana Mae Barbosa received important awards and honors, such as

- 2023: Honorary degree, Universidad Nacional de las Artes/UNA (Buenos Aires, AR).
- 2022: Professor Emeritus, ECA-USP.
- 2021: Waldisa Rússio Camargo Guarnieri Medal of Museological Merit.
- 2019: Donizete Galvão Award, Balada Literária de São Paulo.
- 2018: Honoris Causa Professor, UFPE.
- 2017: Itaú Cultural 30 Years Award, Itaú Cultural.
- 2016: Ordem do Mérito Cultural, awarded by the Ministry of Culture to people who stand out for their contributions to culture.
- 2016: 58th Prêmio Jabuti, in the Education and Pedagogy category for Redesenhando o Desenho: Educadores, Política e História.
- 2014: Named Consejera Honoraria of the Latin American Council of Education through Art (CLEA).
- 2006: Edwing Ziegfeld Award.
- 1999: Sir Herbert Read International Award, InSEA-UNESCO.
- 1997: Distinguished Fellow title, National Art Education Association (NAEA).
- 1989: Grand Prix for Criticism in the Visual Arts category, São Paulo Association of Art Critics (APCA).
