= Antonia Darder =

American scholar and artist

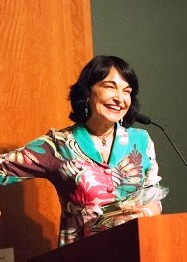
Darder speaking at Loyola Marymount University

Antonia Darder (born 1952) is a Puerto Rican and American scholar, artist, poet and activist. She holds the Leavey Presidential Endowed Chair in Ethics and Moral Leadership in the School of Education at Loyola Marymount University. She also is professor emerita of educational policy, organization, and leadership at the University of Illinois at Urbana-Champaign.

== Education ==
Darder was born in Puerto Rico in 1952. She attended Pasadena City College, where she earned a degree in nursing. She later attended Cal State Los Angeles for her bachelor's in Rehabilitation Counseling and received a master's degree from Pacific Oaks College in Human Development. In 1989, she received her doctorate in Education from Claremont Graduate University.

== Early life ==
When Darder was three, her mother brought her to the mainland during the Operation Bootstrap post-war migration when more than 500,000 Puerto Ricans emigrated to the United States between 1949 and 1959.

Raised in poverty in East Los Angeles, Darder was a young mother with three children when she began her studies at Pasadena City College in 1972. While at PCC, she began exploring the realm of cultural differences in U.S. society, as a bilingual peer counselor. Upon completing nursing school, she worked as a pediatric nurse in a hospital and then for the Head Start Program. Her work included developing programs for parents, and providing health education for children and their families. She attended California State University Los Angeles and then Pacific Oaks College, where she earned a master's degree in Human Development with a specialization in Marriage, Family and Child Counseling.

From 1982 to 1986, Darder began teaching college seminars that focused on sociopolitical issues and questions of culture, human development, and parenting. In 1986, she joined the faculty at Pacific Oaks where she developed a graduate program in Bicultural Development that was discussed in her first book, Culture and Power in the Classroom.

In the late 80s and early 90s, Darder studied and worked with renowned Brazilian educator, Paulo Freire, whose ideas profoundly influenced the direction of her life's work. Her book Reinventing Paulo Freire: A Pedagogy of Love focused on Freire's important contributions to education, particularly from the standpoint of oppressed communities.

From 1993 to 1996, as a recipient of a Kellogg Foundation fellowship and participant in the Kellogg International Leadership Program, her research took her to Peru, where she studied the education and culture of indigenous children in the Andes.

== Recent work ==
Darder has taught at California Polytechnic University and the Massachusetts Institute of Technology, and was recognized as a distinguished professor at New Mexico State University, Las Cruces. In 2005, working with graduate students and community members, she established the Liberacion! Radio Collective, a public affairs radio program on WEFT 90.1 Champaign that examines politics, art, and struggle through the nexus of local/global connections.

In 2011, Darder was recognized as professor emerita at the University of Illinois, where she taught in the Department of Educational Policy Studies from 2003 to 2011. Since 2011, she served as Presidential Endowed Chair in Ethics and Moral Leadership in the School of Education at Loyola Marymount University and she announced her retirement in early 2022.

== Honors and awards ==
In addition to her recognition as a distinguished professor and endowed chair of ethics and moral leadership at Loyola Marymount, Darder has received numerous awards and honors for both her scholarly and community contributions. In 2015, Darder was inducted as an American Educational Research Association Fellow and was one of nine internationally recognized educators nominated for the Brock Prize in Education.

In 2016, she was awarded the Alpha Sigma Nu Outstanding Book of the Year award for the International Critical Pedagogy Reader, co-edited with Peter Mayo & João Paraskeva. She was then honored for her scholarship and community activism by CADRE, a parent community organization working with families in South Central Los Angeles. Later that year, she was also awarded the Paulo Freire Democratic Project award, given to individuals who embody the life and legacy of Paulo Freire and who are characterized by intellectual excellence, ethical concern and deep commitment to the creation, nurturing, and sustainability of fair and just communities.

In 2017, she was awarded the Scholars of Color Distinguished Career Contribution Award by the American Education Research Association. Other honors have included the Eminent Scholar Award from Southern Queensland University, Toowoomba, Australia; a Thinker in Residence Distinguished Faculty Fellowship from Victoria University, Melbourne, Australia; and a Rains Award for Excellence in Research, Scholarship, and Creative Work. She has also been the recipient of a Distinguished International Research Fellow Award from New Castle University, Callaghan, Australia; and a Heroes Award from the Sisters of Saint Joseph for Reconciliation and Justice awarded to individuals who exemplify justice and reconciliation in their lives. Along with a national Kellogg Foundation Fellowship, she has also received the Social Justice in Education Award from the University of New Mexico, an Outstanding Book of the Year honor from the American Educational Research Association for her book Reinventing Paulo Freire: A Pedagogy of Love, and recognition for her Outstanding Service to the Latino Community from El Centro de Acción Social. Darder was one of 72 women chosen to appear in Victoria Alvarado's book, Mujeres de Consciencia/Women of Conscience. (Floricanto Press, 2009), a tribute to U.S. Latinas who have made a definite and long standing contribution to the Latino community and the nation at large.

== Artistic endeavors ==
=== Poet ===
In 1983, Darder's first book of poetry, Each Day I Feel More Free was published. For the next six years, she frequently presented her poetry at cultural events. Over the years, her poetry has been published in a variety of venues, including the Boston Journal of Education. Although somewhat unorthodox, she often includes poetry in her academic speeches and texts. In her last book, A Dissident Voice: Essays on Culture, Pedagogy, and Power, each of the seven sections in the book begins with one of her poems.

=== Visual artist ===
In 1984, Darder traveled to visit a friend in the Coyoacán neighborhood of Mexico City and there discovered the museum La Casa Azul (the Blue House) which was the residence of renowned painters Frida Kahlo and Diego Rivera. Darder experienced such inspiration from her daily afternoon sojourns to the Blue House that she began painting immediately after returning home from Mexico City. Since then, she has exhibited her work in a variety of venues including Self-Help Graphics and Plaza de la Raza in Los Angeles, and continues to create new works.

=== Songwriter ===
Darder first performed and wrote songs in the mid-1980s for Canto Jibaro, a Los Angeles community musical ensemble of Chicano and Puerto Rican activists, whose music carried a revolutionary message. Later she began learning to play the guitar. With Guido Nuñez del Prado, a Peruvian folk musician, she co-edited an anthology of articles on music of the Andes, Seminario de Musica de la Region. Writing and performing in English and Spanish, Darder has penned over 20 folksongs of love, struggle, and freedom.

== Bibliography ==
=== Books ===
Darder's first book, Culture and Power in the Classroom (Bergin & Garvey), was released in 1991. The book was recognized by The Nation in 1992 as "a significant tool for democratic schooling in the 20th century." As a scholar of the Tomas Rivera Policy Institute she wrote The Policies and the Promise: The Public Schooling of Latino Children (1993). Her follow-up book, Reinventing Paulo Freire: A Pedagogy of Love (Westview, 2001), was named one of the outstanding books in curriculum for 2001-2002 by the American Educational Research Association. In 2011, A Dissident Voice, Essays on Culture, Pedagogy and Power was released by Peter Lang books. The book is a compilation of 21 essays and seven poems published from 1991 to 2011. In 2012, the 20th anniversary edition of Culture and Power in the Classroom was published by Paradigm Press.

Darder co-authored with Rodolfo Torres the book After Race: Racism After Multiculturalism, and was editor of Culture and Difference (Bergin & Garvey, 1995). She also co-edited Latinos and Education (Routledge, 1996/2013), The Latino Studies Reader: Culture, Economy and Society (Blackwell, 1997), The Critical Pedagogy Reader (Routledge, 2002/2008) and International Critical Pedagogy Reader. Continuing to provide ongoing perspective in the field, Darder served as an associate editor and advisory board member for the journal Latino Studies.

=== Film ===
In 2009, Darder's documentary, Breaking Silence: The Pervasiveness of Oppression, was awarded the second place prize at the Central Illinois Women's Film Festival. The film was produced with a team of graduate students and community members involved in the Diversity and Technology for Engaging Communities research team, a study examining issues of power, privilege, and racism on the UIUC campus.

=== News editorials and columns ===
- Darder, A. (2015). Racism in a Medically Segregated World. Truthout.
- Darder, A. (2015). Facing the Complexities of the Charter School Debate. Truthout.
- Darder, A. (2015). Childhood Trauma and the Struggle for Liberation. Truthout.
- Darder, A. (2015). From One Never Meant to Survive in Truthout.
- Darder, A. (2015). Countering the "Chega Freire" Campaign in Brazil: Our Emancipatory Struggle Continues. Truthout.
- Darder, A. (2014). Racism and the Charter School Movement: Unveiling the Myths. Truthout.
- Darder, A. and P. Mayo (2013). Response to Syria a Duplicitous Affair. Truthout.
- Darder, A, (2012). Disparity in Schools is Just One Symptom in New York Times
- Mayo, P., A. Darder, A, Hickling-Hudson (2012). From 9/11 to 9/12: The Onset of Neoliberalism in Turkey, 32 Years On. Truthout.
- Darder, A. (2009). Kurdish Educators Arrested in Public I, Urbana, Illinois
- Darder, A. (2008) "1968/2008: Making Power for Change" Public I, Urbana, Illinois
- Darder, A. (2008) "Pedagogy of the Oppressed Revisited" Public I, Urbana, Illinois
- Darder, A. (2008) "Making Sense of the Iraq War with Boricua Eyes" Public I, Urbana, Illinois
- Darder, A. (2007) "Vernon Bellecourt: A Life of Struggle for Indian Rights" Public I, Urbana, Illinois
- Darder, A. (2007) "UN Declaration on Rights of Indigenous Peoples" Public I, Urbana, Illinois
- Darder, A. (2007) "Imagining Justice: Politics, Love, and Dissent" Public I, Urbana, Illinois
- Darder, A. (2007) "Elvira Arellano:Inspiring the Immigrant Rights Struggle" Public I, Urbana, Illinois
- Darder, A. (2006) "Colonized Wombs: Politics of Sterilization" Public I, Urbana, Illinois
- Darder, A. (1993) "Reflections on El Centro de Accion Social" Star News, Pasadena, California
- Darder, A. (1987) "Hunger: A Legacy of Colonial System" Star News, Pasadena, California
- Darder, A. (1987) "Schools Lag Behind People They Serve" Star News, Pasadena, California
- Darder, A. (1987) "Looking Deep to Find the Roots of Racism" Star News, Pasadena, California
- Darder, A. (1986) "Minorities and Family Planning" Star News, Pasadena, California
- Darder, A. (1986) "When Drugs Entered in the Mainstream" Star News, Pasadena, California
- Darder, A. (1986) "Freeway Destruction to Minority Communities" Star News, Pasadena, California.
- Darder, A. (1986) "Minority Leadership" Star News, Pasadena, California
- Darder, A. (1986) "Bilingual Education: An Old Tradition" Star News, Pasadena, California
- Darder, A. (1983) "Fair Community Representation" Star News, Pasadena, California

=== Literary publications ===
- Darder. A. (2011). You say you've got a program? in A Dissident Voice: Essays in Culture, Pedagogy and Power. New York: Peter Lang.
- Darder. A. (2011). The Great Mother Wails in A Dissident Voice: Essays in Culture, Pedagogy and Power. New York: Peter Lang.
- Darder. A. (2011). The unexpected reappearance of don quixote in A Dissident Voice: Essays in Culture, Pedagogy and Power. New York: Peter Lang.
- Darder. A. (2011). Cafe Contemplation in A Dissident Voice: Essays in Culture, Pedagogy and Power. New York:Peter Lang.
- Darder. A. (2011). Of struggle and reflection in A Dissident Voice: Essays in Culture, Pedagogy and Power. New York: Peter Lang.
- Darder. A. (2011). Rican woman Madness is just another word for love in A Dissident Voice: Essays in Culture, Pedagogy and Power. New York: Peter Lang.
- Darder. A. (2011). A bicultural riddle in A Dissident Voice: Essays in Culture, Pedagogy and Power. New York: Peter Lang.
- Darder, A. (2008) "The Great Mother Wails" Public I (November)
- Darder, A. (2007) "Al Amanecer/At Dawn" Multicultural Education Journal (Spring)
- Darder, A. (1996) "Sobreviviendo: Notes on Poetry and Grief" Women Who Don't Sell Out L. Fulani (ed.) New York: Carrillo International
- Darder, A. (1993) "rican-woman-madness is just another word for love" The California Sociologist: Culture and Conflict in the Academy G. Romero and L. Arguelles (eds.). Vol. 26.
- Darder, A. (1992) "desenterandote" Si Se Puede M. Baca, et al. (eds.) Special Edition: Dia de la Raza Santa Barbara, California, October
- Darder, A. (1991) "The unexpected reappearance of don quixote" Journal of Education: Crossing Borders, Building Bridges: Bilingualism in the 90's D. Macedo (ed.). Boston U. Press
- Darder, A. (1991) "of struggle and reflection" Journal of Education, Crossing Borders, Bridging Worlds: Bilingualism in the 90's (special issue). D. Macedo (ed.). Boston University Press
- Darder, A. (1991) "a bicultural riddle" Journal of Education, Crossing Borders, Bridging Worlds:Bilingualism in the 90's (special issue), D. Macedo (ed.). Boston University Press
- Darder, A. (1989) "the woman with many hearts" Canto Jibaro Press
- Darder, A. (1985) "i want to feel good" The Southern California Anthology M. McLaughlin and C.Westphal (eds.). Los Angeles, CA: University of Southern California
- Darder, A. (1984) "when she reads this i hope she feels the love" The Southern California Anthology J. Woetzel, et al. (eds.) Santa Barbara, CA: Ross-Erickson Publishers
- Darder, A. (1983) "you say you've got a program?" Chismearte M. Gamboa and L. Rodriguez (eds.) Los Angeles, CA: Concilio Arte Popular
