= Gino Piccio =

Luigi Piccio (12 September 1920 – 10 March 2014) was an Italian activist and Catholic priest. Often referred to as Don Gino, Piccio was Italy's foremost expert on critical pedagogy, in particular of the educational philosophy of Paulo Freire.
