= Howard Richards (academic) =

American-Chilean philosopher (1938–2024)

Howard Curtis Richards
- Born: June 10, 1938; Pasadena, California, U.S.
- Died: April 7, 2024 (aged 85); Limache, Chile
- Spouse: Caroline Higgins

Academic background
- Education: University of California, Santa Barbara
- Thesis: Distributive Justice (1974)
- Influences: Paulo Freire; Rom Harré; Gandhi

Academic work
- Notable works: Letters from Quebec; Understanding the Global Economy; Dilemmas of Social Democracies; The Evaluation of Cultural Action; Gandhi and the Future of Economics; Re-thinking the Economy; Unbounded Organization

Howard Curtis Richards (June 10, 1938 – April 7, 2024) was an American-Chilean philosopher of Social Science who worked with the concepts of basic cultural structures (Note: Richards What the World Needs Now. Cultural action to transform the basic structures of the modern world is a general concept that unites most of Richards' writing - see: Richards (2014): Unbounded Organization p. 1 and 8. Methods for Transforming the Structures of the Modern World is the subtitle of Vol.II of Richards 1994 Letters from Quebec.) and constitutive rules. (Note: Constitutive rule, a key concept rooted in the work of John Searle and Charles Taylor and in Richards' Oxford tutor Rom Harré's rules-oriented approach to the explanation of social behavior. One can find a good description of what Prof Richards understands by Constitutive Rules in his 2010 speech at the University of South Africa (UNISA) Humanizing Methodologies in Transformation.) He held the title of research professor of philosophy at Earlham College, a liberal arts college in Richmond, Indiana, the United States, the Quaker School where he taught for thirty years. He retired from Earlham College, together with his wife Caroline Higgins in 2007, and became a research professor of philosophy. He held a Ph.D. in philosophy from the University of California, Santa Barbara, a Juris Doctor (J.D.) from the Stanford Law School, an Advanced Certificate in Education (ACE) from Oxford University (the UK) and a Ph.D. in Educational Planning from the Ontario Institute for Studies in Education (OISE), University of Toronto, Canada. He taught at the University of Santiago, Chile, and had ongoing roles at the University of South Africa (UNISA) and the University of Cape Town's Graduate School of Business program. He is founder of the Peace and Global Studies Program (Note: The name of the Program has varied over the years from Peace Studies to Peace and Conflict Studies and then, continuing until now, Peace and Global Studies.) and co-founder of the Business and Nonprofit Management Program at Earlham.

== Early life ==
Howard Richards was born in Pasadena, California, the eldest child of Kenneth F. Richards, a truck mechanic, originally from Connecticut, and his wife Donna. (Note: (McCune)) It was his mother's intellectual interest in philosophers such as Henri Bergson which prompted the family to break its ties with Mormonism. His paternal grandparents fell into unemployment in Connecticut during the Great Depression and moved to Pasadena in 1932. It was his uncle Jack from his mother's side, who died during World War II, and especially his mother who fostered his early intellectual interest.

== Academic background ==
After graduating from Redlands High School, CA, in June 1956, Richards enrolled in the same year as a Philosophy undergraduate at Yale. Being a top student, he was allowed to skip one year of the normal three-year Major in Philosophy course. Afterward, he was admitted to Stanford Law School in 1958, graduating with a Juris Doctor (J.D.) degree in 1961. Later in that year, he enrolled in graduate school at the University of California Santa Barbara, earning an M.A. in Philosophy there in 1964 with a thesis on Jean-Paul Sartre. Simultaneously he worked at the Center for the Study of Democratic Institutions think tank where he contributed several articles to the in-house Center Magazine. In 1965 he left for Chile, where they ultimately would settle in the town of Limache. Soon after their arrival, Howard took up the post of dean of studies at the Santiago College, (a college in Chile is a secondary school). While in Santiago, Howard joined the Chilean Ministry of Education as an advisor to President Eduardo Frei's Educational Reform, working on a Secondary Curriculum influenced by the ideas of the Brazilian Educator Paulo Freire In late 1970 Richards and his family left for the UK where Richards enrolled for an Advanced Certificate in Education (ACE) at Oxford University, simultaneously doing one on one tutorials and attending seminars by the philosophers Rom Harré and A. J. Ayer. He graduated with an honors thesis on Piaget. Back in Chile in 1972, now under president Salvador Allende, he continued to work with Freire's ideas at CIDE (Centro de Investigación y Desarrollo de la Educación - Educational Research and Development Center) where he founded the Parents and Children Program (Programa Padres e Hijos - PHH), a Community Development combined with a Parent Education program.

Richards and his family left Chile in 1974, after Pinochet's 1973 coup d'état, but not before having helped friends and colleagues escape Pinochet's DINA police. The philosophy curriculum Richards had helped develop was repealed shortly after the coup but was adopted in several other Latin American countries. In September 1974 Richards and his family returned to the USA where he started work at Earlham College in Richmond, Indiana. Later that year he successfully defended his doctoral thesis in Philosophy at the University of California Santa Barbara, having done the preparatory work when still in Chile. While based in Richmond, he attended the Lawrence Kohlberg Summer School on Moral Education at Harvard University. Richards became a professor at Earlham College and was the founding director of its Peace and Global Studies program until 1989 and part-time Director until 2004. Between 1981 and 1985, Richards combined commitments in Richmond with those at OISE, Toronto, with the occasional stay in Quebec where their daughters were studying at a French-speaking school, he enrolled in another Ph.D. program in Education, with the first field in curriculum planning and a second field in applied psychology and moral education, at the University of Toronto's Institute for Studies in Education (UT/OISE), which he successfully completed with a doctoral thesis based on the Chilean PPH program. He also became an active contributor to the OISE-based active think-tank about the new economic paradigm known as The Transformative Learning Centre (TLC).

== Social engagement, research and teaching ==
At Stanford Law School (1958–61) he co-founded the Stanford Political Union's Socialist Caucus, became involved in the Peace Movement and began volunteer work for farm labor causes. He co-founded, with Stanford radical books seller Roy Kepler, Ira Sandperl and others, the Peninsula Peace Center, effectively running it for a while. He was also editor and author of a modest journal called Utopian Papers. After graduation from law school (1961), he joined the Santa Barbara, California Center for the Study of Democratic Institutions headed by Robert Hutchins to whom he became a personal assistant, and became the first volunteer attorney for Cesar Chavez' Farm Workers Association when he started organizing the FWA in Delano, California. He worked as evaluator of cultural change projects in Costa Rica, Ecuador, Bolivia and Chile He also did evaluative work on economic institutions (Economía Solidaria) in Argentina. Economic theory and Community Development together with Public Employment Programs are his more recent research areas.

Richards was on the advisory board of Human Dignity and Humiliation Studies (HumanDHS), a global transdisciplinary fellowship of concerned academics and practitioners who wish to promote dignity and transcend humiliation. Richards' principal teaching experience stretches from 1974 to 2007 as Professor of Philosophy and Education on the Peace and Global Studies Program (PAGS) at Earlham College. When no longer at Earlham, he taught short courses in different international locations. Starting in 2009 he became a distinguished fellow of the South African Research Chairs Initiative in Development Education (SARChI) based at the University of South Africa (UNISA) Pretoria, and then a collaborator at the Johannesburg-based Seriti Institute with Dr. Gavin Andersson. In South Africa, too, he teaches in the Executive MBA Program at the University of Cape Town. He is also co-chair of the Chilean group Repensar Ia Economía (Re-thinking the Economy).

== Law practice ==
Richards was the first volunteer attorney for Cesar Chavez and Dolores Huerta, when they started to organize farm workers in Delano, in California's Central Valley. Richards specialized in Bankruptcy as a partner in the firm of Crane, Richards, and Flores after joining the Legal Aid Foundation in 1989. In 1990 he also was a voluntary attorney at the Los Angeles Free Clinic, a practice he wound up in 2004, when he moved back to Limache, Chile.

== Personal life and death ==
Richards married Caroline Higgins in July 1965. They had two daughters. Richards died on April 7, 2024, at the age of 85.

== Major works and ideas ==
- In his first major work, The Evaluation of Cultural Action (1984), Richards "unveils throughout the text the rationale for using an 'illuminative' approach (Parlett and Hamilton, 1974) rather than a conventional 'systems' assessment". The long dialogue with a "reasonable social scientist" gravitates around how to evaluate education and community development efforts inspired by the Brazilian adult educationist Paulo Freire's philosophy, combined with an empirical study of one such effort, namely PPH (Parents and Children Program) that flourished among peasants in the south of Chile in the 1970s and 1980s.
- Richards' two-volume Letters from Quebec: a Philosophy for Peace and Justice (1994) aspires to be both literary entertainment and the history of rationality in western culture and philosophy, illuminating the possibilities for transformative and humanistic action. The subtitle of volume Two of Letters from Quebec is 'Methods for Transforming the Structures of the Modern World'. Taking leads from Paulo Freire and Antonio Gramsci, the philosopher is seen - borrowing a phrase from Paulo Freire - as a 'cultural activist' who invents rationalities.
- Building on the premise that standards of rationality are historically constructed social norms, he went on, in Understanding the Global Economy (2004), to argue that causal explanations in economics invariably rely, as premises, on cultural norms, and particularly on constitutive rules Richards proposes to understand institutions by following out the consequences of the rules that organize them. Understanding the Global Economy reviews the principal schools of economic thought with respect to the causal explanations they offer of the phenomena of today's global economy.
- The Dilemmas of Social Democracies: Overcoming Obstacles to a More Just World (2008) co-authored with Joanna Swanger, applies the philosophical ideas of Richards' earlier works, particularly a concept of basic cultural structure, - where 'basic' identifies those cultural structures that govern the satisfaction of the basic needs of life - to historical case studies of Spain, Sweden, Austria, South Africa, Indonesia, Venezuela, and the World Bank. The upshot is that social democracy is not feasible with the framework provided by the constitutive rules of modernity. Social democracy can only become feasible by adopting an approach Richards and another co-author, Gavin Andersson, will later call unbounded organization.
- Gandhi and the Future of Economics (2011) "makes a case for incorporating Gandhi's insights into mainstream economics. Gandhi and the Future of Economics is not meant to be a research study of Gandhian economics. It is rather that kind of felicitous publication that breathes new life into a known theme, and, in doing so, brings out its implications for praxis. It does all this in dialogue with a set of contemporary thinkers and actors from the Indian sub-continent: Jawaharlal Nehru, Jayaprakash Narayan, Tariq Ali, Vandana Shiva, Amartya Sen, Arundhati Roy, Manmohan Singh." (Ivo Coelho).
- The Nurturing of Time Future (2012) defines itself as "a short book about everything", addressed to educated people of goodwill who see the need for paradigmatic change. It proposes a philosophy in the old-fashioned sense of articulating a synthesis of the social and natural sciences that provides an overall framework for deciding what to do. It is a 'belles lettres' exercise written in the style of Marcel Proust.
- Rethinking Thinking: Modernity's "Other" and the transformation of the University (2012) co-authored with Catherine Hoppers, further develops a theme found in early works – that modernity has much to learn from pre-modernity. It includes an account of how the constitutive rules of markets presupposed by economics developed in Roman Law. They are contrasted with indigenous African cultural norms. Rethinking also argues that bringing modernity's "other" into the curriculum of the university will transform the curriculum, transform research and transform community engagement.
- Richards' most recent book Unbounded Organizing in Community (2015), co-authored with Gavin Andersson of South Africa's Seriti Institute, offers a combination of a down to earth, practical guide to doing community organizing inspired by the Organization Workshops of Clodomir Santos de Morais, with an elementary introduction to Andersson's theory of unbounded organization. Emphasis is on practical examples and guidelines for organizers and participants.

== Other books and articles ==
Richards has also published fourteen other books some in English and some in Spanish, among the latter, Richards, 1987, Ética y Economía (Ethics and Economics), and González Meyer & Richards (2012) Hacia otras Economias. Critica al paradigma dominante (Towards other Economies - Critique of the Dominant Paradigm). A list of Richards' other books, articles, conferences and speeches (e.g. Howard Richards, 1995 Nehru Lectures) can be found on HR Professor of Peace and Global Studies (up to 2010), HR Bibliography, HR website and the more recent Unbounded Organization webpage.

== See also ==
- Evelin Lindner
- Betty Reardon

== Publications ==
- Andersson, Gavin; Richards, Howard (2012). "Bounded and Unbounded Organization". Africanus. 42 (1): 98–119. ISSN 0304-615X.
- Andersson, Gavin; Richards, Howard (2015). Unbounded Organizing in Community. World Dignity University Press. ISBN 9781937570606.
- Bertero, Inés; Richards, Howard (2007). Solidaridad, participación, transparencia: conversaciones sobre el socialismo en Rosario, Argentina – Solidarity, Participation, Transparency: conversations on Socialism in Rosario, Argentina. Tinta Roja. ISBN 9789872156329.
- González Meyer, Raúl; Richards, Howard (2012). Hacia otras Economias. Critica al paradigma dominante - Towards other Economies - Critique of the dominant Paradigm (PDF). LOM Ediciones, Chile.
- Hoppers, Catherine; Richards, Howard (2012). Rethinking Thinking. University of South Africa. ISBN 978-1868886890.
- Richards, Howard (1963). An essay on some aspects of Jean-Paul Sartre's concept of nothingness. University of California Santa Barbara Main Library.
- Richards, Howard (1966). Life on a Small Planet: a Philosophy of Value. Philosophical Library, New York.
- Richards, Howard (1974). Distributive Justice – PhD Dissertation Santa Barbara (PhD Thesis). Center for Digital Philosophy.
- Richards, Howard (1982). La Evaluacion de la Accion Cultural. Estudio Evaluativo del P.P.H. (PDF). CIDE, Santiago, Chile.
- Richards, Howard (1984). The Evaluation of Cultural Action - An Evaluative Study of the Parents and Children Program. Palgrave Macmillan. ISBN 978-0333363386.
- Richards, Howard (1994). Letters from Quebec: A Philosophy for Peace and Justice: Volumes I and II. Boomerang books. ISBN 9781883255176.
- Richards, Howard (2004). Understanding the Global Economy. Peace Education Books, Thousand Oaks, CA USA. ISBN 978-0974896106.
- Richards, Howard; Swanger, Joanna (2008). The Dilemmas of Social Democracies: Overcoming Obstacles to a More Just World. Lexington Books. ISBN 978-0-7391-2927-2.
- Richards, Howard; Swanger, Joanna (2011). Gandhi and the Future of Economics. Dignity Press. ISBN 9781937570293.
- Richards, Howard (2012). The Nurturing of Time Future. Dignity Press. ISBN 9781937570019.
- Richards, Howard (July 2013). "Unbounded organisation and the future of socialism" (PDF). Education as Change. 17 (2): 229–242. doi:10.1080/16823206.2013.803662. Archived from the original on January 30, 2023.
- Richards, Howard (2022). Economic Theory and Community Development: Why putting community first is essential to our survival. Dignity Press. ISBN 978-1-952292-08-8.
