= Peter Slade =

Australian rules footballer

Personal information
- Full name: Peter Slade
- Born: 27 March 1954 (age 72)
- Original team: Parkdale
- Height: 178 cm (5 ft 10 in)
- Weight: 70 kg (154 lb)

Playing career^{1}
Years	Club	Games (Goals)
1974	Melbourne	15 (4)
- ^{1} Playing statistics correct to the end of 1974.

Peter Slade (born 27 March 1954) is a former Australian rules footballer who played with Melbourne in the Victorian Football League (VFL).
