= Measured Lies =

Measured Lies: The Bell Curve Examined is a collection of essays on pathological science and pseudoscientific methods used in the science of sociology. It was published in 1997 as a collection of responses, from academics in various related fields, to arguments in the book The Bell Curve. The collection argues that The Bell Curve advocates a specific and fallacious view of race and class, despite the authors' claims of neutrality.
