= Kenneth Tobin =

Kenneth Tobin (born 1944 in Western Australia) is a Presidential Professor of Urban Education in the doctoral program at CUNY Graduate Center in New York City. Throughout his career, he has published over 400 books, book chapters and journal articles in the topics of science education, teacher education, emotions, wellness, and research methods. According to Google Scholar his work has been cited over 17,700 times.

In 1964, Kenneth Tobin began teaching high school science and mathematics in rural Western Australia. He continued as teacher and curriculum developer for a decade, after which he became a teacher educator at Graylands Teachers College, later to become part of Edith Cowan University. In Australia, Tobin has had faculty appointments at the Western Australian Institute of Technology (now Curtin University) and has been an adjunct professor at Queensland University of Technology, and Murdoch University. Tobin came to the United States in 1987 and was a tenured professor at Florida State University (10 years), University of Pennsylvania (6 years), and the Graduate Center of the City University of New York (15 years), where he is presently Presidential Professor of Urban Education.

== Selected works ==
=== Books ===
- Roth, Wolff-Michael, and Kenneth George. Tobin. At the Elbow of Another: Learning to Teach by Coteaching. Lang, 2002.
- Tobin, Kenneth, and Wolff-Michael Roth. Teaching to Learn: a View from the Field. Sense Publishers, 2007.

=== Edited volumes ===
- Lynn Bryan, and Kenneth Tobin eds. Critical issues and bold visions for science education: The road ahead. Leiden, The Netherlands: Sense-Brill Publishing, 2018.
- Ritchie, Stephen, and Kenneth Tobin, eds. Eventful learning: Learner emotions Leiden, The Netherlands: Sense-Brill Publishing, 2018.
- Bryan, Lynn, and Kenneth Tobin, eds. 13 Questions: Reframing education's conversation: Science. New York: Peter Lang, 2018.
- Powietrzyńska, Małgorzata, and Kenneth Tobin, eds. Weaving complementary knowledge systems and mindfulness to educate a literate citizenry for sustainable and healthy lives. Springer, 2017.
- Powietrzyńska, Malgorzata, and Kenneth Tobin, eds. Mindfulness and educating citizens for everyday life. Springer, 2016.
- Milne, Catherine, Kenneth Tobin, and Donna deGennaro eds. Sociocultural studies and implications for science education. Dordrecht, The Netherlands: Springer, 2015.
- Tobin, Kenneth, and Shirley Steinberg, eds. Doing educational research: A handbook (Second edition). Rotterdam, NL: Sense Publishing, 2015.
- Tobin, Kenneth, and Ashraf Shady, eds. Transforming urban education: Collaborating to produce success in science, mathematics and technology education. Rotterdam, NL: Sense Publishing, 2014.
- Fraser, Barry J., Kenneth Tobin, and Campbell J. McRobbie, eds. Second international handbook of science education. Dordrecht: Springer, 2012.
- Hayes, Keica, Shirley Steinberg, and Kenneth Tobin, eds. Key works in critical pedagogy: Joe L. Kincheloe. Rotterdam, NL: Sense Publishing, 2011.
- Roth, Wolff-Michael, and Kenneth Tobin, eds. World of science education: North America. Rotterdam, NL: Sense Publishing, 2009.
- Tobin, Kenneth ed. Teaching and Learning Science: A Handbook. (Paperback version)--New York: Rowman, & Littlefield, 2008.
- Roth, Wolff-Michael, and Kenneth Tobin, eds. Science, learning, and identity: Sociocultural and cultural-historical perspectives. Rotterdam, NL: Sense Publishing, 2007.
- Roth, Wolff-Michael, and Kenneth Tobin, eds. The culture of science education: Its history in person. Rotterdam, NL: Sense Publishing, 2007.
- Tobin, Kenneth, and Joe L. Kincheloe, eds. Doing educational research: A handbook. Rotterdam, NL: Sense Publishing, 2006.
- Tobin, Kenneth. ed. Teaching and Learning Science: A Handbook. Westport, CT: Praeger Press, 2006.
- Tobin, Kenneth, and Wolff-Michael Roth, Teaching to learn: A view from the field. Rotterdam, NL: Sense Publishing, 2006.
- Roth, Wolff-Michael and Kenneth Tobin, eds. Teaching together, learning together. New York, NY: Peter Lang, 2005.
- Tobin, Kenneth, Rowhea Elmesky, and Gale Seiler, eds. Improving urban science education: New roles for teachers, students and researchers. NY: Rowman, & Littlefield, 2005.
- Taylor, Peter, Penny Gilmer, and Kenneth Tobin, K. eds. Transforming undergraduate science teaching: Social constructivist perspectives. New York, NY: Peter Lang Publishing, 2002.
- Tobin, Kenneth George, and Barry J. Fraser, eds. International handbook of science education. Vol. 1 & 2. Kluwer Academic, 1998.
- Tobin, Kenneth ed. The practice of constructivism in science education. Washington, D.C.: American Association for the Advancement of Science Press, 1993. ALSO published by Hillsdale, NJ: Lawrence Erlbaum, & Associates, 1993.
- Tobin, Kenneth, Jane Butler Kahle, and Barry J. Fraser, eds. Windows into science classrooms: Problems associated with higher-level learning. London: Falmer Press, 1990.
- Tobin, Kenneth, and Barry J. Fraser, eds. Exemplary practice in science and mathematics education. Perth: Curtin University of Technology, 1987.

=== Selected articles ===
- Tobin, Kenneth "The role of mindfulness in harmonizing sustainable lifestyles." Learning: Research and Practice,4, (2018): 112-125. DOI: 10.1080/23735082.2018.1435039.
- Tobin, Kenneth "Connecting science education to a world in crisis." Asia-Pacific Science Education, 1, (2016). DOI 10.1186/s41029-015-0003-z.
- Kincheloe, Joe L., and Kenneth Tobin. "The much exaggerated death of positivism." Cultural Studies of Science Education 4.3 (2009): 513-528.
- Tobin, Kenneth, Wolff‐Michael Roth, and Andrea Zimmermann. "Learning to teach science in urban schools." Journal of research in science teaching 38.8 (2001): 941-964.
- Tobin, Kenneth, and Campbell J. McRobbie. "Cultural myths as constraints to the enacted science curriculum." Science education 80.2 (1996): 223-241.
- Tobin, Kenneth, Deborah J. Tippins, and Alejandro José Gallard. "Research on instructional strategies for teaching science." Handbook of research on science teaching and learning 45 (1994): 93.
- Tobin, Kenneth, and Deborah Tippins. "Constructivism as a referent for teaching and learning." The practice of constructivism in science education 1 (1993): 3-22.
- Tobin, Kenneth. "The role of wait time in higher cognitive level learning." Review of educational research 57.1 (1987): 69-95.
- Tobin, Kenneth, and Wolff‐Michael Roth. "Implementing coteaching and cogenerative dialoguing in urban science education." School Science and Mathematics 105.6 (2005): 313-322
- Tobin, Kenneth. "The sociocultural turn in science education and its transformative potential." Sociocultural studies and implications for science education. Springer Netherlands, 2015. 3-31.
- Winchell, Melissa, Tricia M. Kress, and Kenneth Tobin. "Teaching/learning radical listening: Joe’s legacy among three generations of practitioners." Practicing critical pedagogy. Springer International Publishing, 2016. 99-112.

== New Pathways ==
Tobin began formal studies of Jin Shin Jyutsu in 2014 and continues to learn through practice of the art of JSJ, undertaking research on use of JSJ and dis-ease such as diabetes 2, and participation in classes offered by Jin Shin Jyutsu (Scottsdale, AZ) https://www.jsjinc.net/. As part of his focus on different complementary modalities, Tobin also has studied Integrated Iridology with Toni Miller (Brisbane, Australia). Presently he uses both JSJ and iridology in ongoing studies of wellness, mindfulness, and more broadly, contemplative inquiry.

- Tobin, Kenneth (2018). The role of mindfulness in harmonizing sustainable lifestyles. Learning: Research and Practice,4, 112-125. DOI: 10.1080/23735082.2018.1435039.
- Tobin, Kenneth (2018). Mindfulness in education. Learning: Research and Practice, 4, 1-9. DOI: 10.1080/23735082.2018.1433623.
- Tobin, Kenneth & Nick Ansari (2017). Complementary perspectives on the enigma of Diabetes mellitus. In M. Powietrzynska, & K. Tobin (Eds). Weaving complementary knowledge systems and mindfulness to educate a literate citizenry for sustainable and healthy lives (pp. 345–369). Leiden, The Netherlands: Brill |Sense Publishing.
- Tobin, Kenneth (2017). Researching mindfulness and wellness. In M. Powietrzynska, & K. Tobin (Eds). Weaving complementary knowledge systems and mindfulness to educate a literate citizenry for sustainable and healthy lives (pp. 1–19). Leiden, The Netherlands: Brill | Sense Publishing.
- Tobin, Kenneth, Konstantinos Alexakos, Anna Malyukova, & Karim A.- H. Gangji, (2016). Jin Shin Jyutsu and ameliorating emotion, enhancing mindfulness, and sustaining productive learning environments. In A. Bellocchi, K. Otrel-Cass, & C. Quigley (Eds). Beyond cognition in science education. Springer: NL, Dordrecht.
- Tobin, Kenneth (2016). Connecting science education to a world in crisis. Asia-Pacific Science Education, 1, DOI 10.1186/s41029-015-0003-z.
- Tobin, Kenneth, King, D., Henderson, S., Bellocchi, A., & Ritchie, S. M. (2016). Expression of emotions and physiological changes during teaching. Cultural Studies of Science Education. DOI: 10.1007/s11422-016-9778-9 (view published version at: http://rdcu.be/jQRi)
- Tobin, Kenneth (2016). Collaborating on global priorities: Science education for everyone – any time and everywhere. Cultural Studies of Science Education, 11(1), 27-40. DOI: 10.1007/s11422-015-9708-2
- Tobin, Kenneth (2015). The sociocultural turn: Beyond theoretical imperialism and the imperative of learning from difference. In Catherine Milne, Kenneth Tobin, & Donna deGennaro (Eds). Sociocultural studies and implications for science education (pp. 3–31). Dordrecht, The Netherlands: Springer. DOI: 10.1007/978-94-007-4240-6_1
- Tobin, Kenneth, Konstantinos Alexakos, & Malgorzata Powietrzynska, (2015). Mindfulness and wellness: Central components of a science of learning. Innovación Educativa, 15(67), 61-87.
