= Peter Mayo =

Maltese academic

Peter Mayo (born 2 May 1955) is a Maltese professor, writer, and former head of the Department of Arts, Open Communities and Adult Education at the University of Malta. He holds the UNESCO Chair in Global Adult Education at the same university. He holds a PhD - Major in Sociology, Minor in Adult Education, University of Toronto and a PhD in the programme of Estudios Artisticos, Literarios y de la Cultura, Universidad Autónoma de Madrid.

== Career ==
Mayo served as the university's Head of the Department of Education Studies from 2008 to 2012. Mayo was a member of the Collegio Docenti for the doctoral research programme in Educational Sciences and Continuing Education at the Università degli Studi di Verona. He teaches in the areas of sociology of education and adult continuing education, as well as in comparative and international education and sociology in general. He was previously employed as a school teacher and later as Officer in Charge of Adult Education in the then Department of Education, Ministry of Education, Malta. Mayo was a Visiting Professorial Fellow at the Institute of Education, University College London during 2014. He was previously a member of the Collegio Docenti for the international doctorate in intercultural sociology and education at the University of Messina and was the President of the Mediterranean Society of Comparative Education (MESCE) from 2008 to 2010.

Mayo has published over 150 papers in refereed journals or as edited book chapters and has been serving as book series editor for Brill-de Gruyter, Bloomsbury Academic, and Palgrave-Macmillan. He is also one of the two founding editors for the refereed journal Postcolonial Directions in Education. which both edited for its first ten years. He is also the Editor of Convergence. An International Adult Education Journal which he resuscitated in 2022.

== Awards and recognition ==
- Comparative International Education Society (CIES) Higher Education SIG Award for the best published research article on higher education from an international and comparative perspective (2011)
- Cyril Houle Award by the American Association for Adult Continuing Education, 2013, with Leona English - for Learning with Adults: A Critical pedagogical Introduction
- Invited as 'Noted Scholar' at the University of British Columbia, Vancouver, Canada, (2010)
- Inducted into International Adult Continuing Education Hall of Fame, September 2019
- Honourable Mention of book Higher Education in a Globalising World. Community Engagement and Lifelong Learning in Book Awards of Higher Education Sig, Comparative and International Education Society
- GPS Scholar ranking O.5% Lifelong Learning, Pedagogy, 2024-2025
- Honorary Professor, University of Nottingham
- Stanford-Elsevier Scientist ranking for 2024-2025 top 2%
- Honoris Causa Doctorate to be conferred by Hellenic Open University, Patras, Greece, January 2027

== Books ==
- The National Museum of Fine Arts: Art Treasures in Malta (1995, Midsea Publications)
- Beyond Schooling: Adult Education in Malta (co-edited with Godfrey Baldacchino, Mireva, Malta, 1997)
- Gramsci, Freire and Adult Education (Zed Books, London, 1999); also published in Catalan (Crec, Xativa-Valencia), Portuguese (Artmed, Porto Alegre), German (Argument Verlag, Hamburg), Italian (Carlo Delfino Editore, Sassari), Spanish (Instituto Paulo Freire de España y edicions del CREC; col.laboradores: denes editorial y diálogos.red, Valencia) Turkish (UTOPYA, Ankara) and Japanese (TaroJiro-Sha Editus Co., Ltd.)
- Gramsci and Education (co-edited with Carmel Borg and Joseph A. Buttigieg, Rowman & Littlefield, Maryland, 2002) also published in Turkish (Kalkedon, Istanbul), Spanish (Xativa-Valencia, denes editorial y diálogos.red)and Catalan translation (Crec, Xativa).
- Liberating Praxis: Paulo Freire's Legacy for Radical Education and Politics (Praeger, Westport CT, 2004), AESA Critics Choice Award 2005; in paperback by Sense Publishers, Rotterdam, 2008;in Catalan translation, as La Praxi Alliberadora. El Llegat de Paulo Freire per a l’Educació Radical i Politica, (Xativa, Denes editorial, Crec, 2008); also published, in Turkish translation, as Özgürlestiren Praksis - Paulo Freire'nin Radikal Eğitim ve politica Mirasi (Ankara, Dipnot, 2012).
- Learning and Social Difference. Challenges for Critical Pedagogy. (co-authored with Carmel Borg, London and New York City, Routledge, Taylor & Francis, 2006 - originally published by Paradigm)
- Education, Society and Leadership (co-edited with Mary Darmanin, Allied Publishers, Malta, 2007),
- Adult Education in Malta (DVV-International, Bonn, 2007)
- Public Intellectuals; Radical Democracy and Social Movements. A Book of Interviews (with Carmel Borg, Peter Lang Publishers, New York, 2007).
- Mediterranean Studies in Comparative Education (co-edited with Carmel Borg and Ronald G. Sultana, MESCE and EMCER, 2009).
- Education in Small States. Global Imperatives, Regional Initiatives and Local Dilemmas (edited, London & New York City, Routledge, Taylor & Francis 2009)
- Gramsci and Educational Thought (edited, Oxford and New York, Wiley-Blackwell, 2010) also published in Turkish translation, as Gramsci ve Eğitsel Düşünce (Istanbul, Kalkedon, 2010).
- Learning with Adults. A Critical Pedagogical Introduction (co-authored with Leona English, Rotterdam, Sense Publishers, 2012). Winner of 2013 Cyril Houle Award for "outstanding literature in adult education"; also published in Spanish translation, as Aprendiendo con personas adultas. una introducción crítica y pedagógica (Xativa, Instituto Paulo Freire de España, Dialogos, CREC, 2013); also published, in Catalan translation, as Aprenent amb persones adultes: una introducció crítica i pedagògica (Xativa, Instituto Paulo Freire de España, CREC, 2013)
- Echoes from Freire for a Critically Engaged Pedagogy (New York City & London, Bloomsbury Academic, 2012)
- Politics of Indignation. Imperialism, Postcolonial Disruptions and Social Change (Alresford, Hants, Zer0 Books/John Hunt Publishers, 2012)
- Learning with Adults. A Reader (edited) (Rotterdam, Boston & Taipei: Sense, 2013)
- Lorenzo Milani, the School of Barbiana and the Struggle for Social Justice (co-authored with Federico Batini and Alessio Surian, New York & Frankfurt, Peter Lang, 2014).
- Práctica de la Práctica. Compromiso y Libertad en las Experiencas Educativas Emancipadoras, (Xativa: Instituto Paulo Freire de España, Dialogos, Tarepa PV, 2014).
- Hegemony and Education under Neoliberalism. Insights from Gramsci (New York City & London: Routledge, Taylor & Francis 2015)
- International Critical Pedagogy Reader (co-edited with Antonia Darder and João Paraskeva), New York and London, Routledge, Taylor & Francis 2015)
- Saggi di Pedagogia Critica.Oltre il Neoliberismo. Analizzando educatori, lotte e movimenti sociali, co-authored with Paolo Vittoria (Florence: Società Editrice Fiorentina, 2017).
- Higher Education in a Globalising World. Community Engagement and Lifelong Learning (Manchester: Manchester University Press, 2019 hbk, 2021 pbk)
- Lifelong Learning, Global Social Justice and Sustainability (co-authored with Leona English)(New York and Basingstoke: Palgrave-Macmillan, 2021)
- Critical Education in International Perspective (co-authored with Paolo Vittoria) (London and New York: Bloomsbury Academic, 2022 hbk, 2023 pbk)
- Adult Learning and Difference ( co-edited with B. Slade and Thi Boghossian) (Leyden and Boston: Brill, 2024)
- Stretching Boundaries of Critical Education. Past, Present and Future Possibilities ( co-edited with C.Borg) ( Malta: Faculty of Education, 2024)
- Culture, Power and Education. Representation, Interpretation, Contestation (Routledge, 2025); versions in Catalan and Spanish translations published by IPF-ESPAÑA; version in Turkish published by Toz, Ankara.
- ' Southern' Europe and Beyond in the Mediterranean. Critical Essays on Adult Learning and Education ( Brill, 2026)
- Learning, Identity and Difference. Mary Darmanin's Inspiration . ( Festschrift in honour of Professor Dr Mary Darmanin, edited by P. Mayo) (Emerald, 2026)
