= Christine Ballengee-Morris =

American art educator

Christine Ballengee-Morris is a professor in the Arts Administration, Education and Policy Department for Ohio State University. She is the founding director of the Multicultural Center at Ohio State University.

== Biography ==
Ballengee-Morris was born on February 15, 1955. She hails from Appalachia. She grew up in the Dayton, Ohio area. After high school she attended Miami University of Ohio and in 1980 received her BS in art education. She went on to receive a MA in Art Education from Miami University of Ohio and a PhD in art education from Penn State University. After graduating from Penn State in 1995 she accepted a position at Ohio State University. She now teaches classes that specialize in diversity explorations.

== Contributions ==
Ballengee-Morris has written and edited articles for the journal Art Education from at least 1998 to 2016. She also wrote a chapter in the book "Real-World Readings in Art Education: Things Your Professor Never Told You" by Dennis E. Fehr. Ballengee-Morris' chapter, titled "Mountain Culture: No Hillbillies Here", details her view on only teaching mainstream art to students and the impact that has on their identity.

Ballengee-Morris was a Coordinator of American Indian Studies.
