= Social choreography =

Social choreography describes how people move, interact, and relate to one another in social space. It is a term used across performance studies, dance theory, sociology, and artistic practice to better understand how movement, bodily relations, spatial organization, and collective behavior structure and transform social life.

The term has evolved across several overlapping but distinct lineages. These include theoretical work written by Andrew Hewitt, who examined choreography as a means through which ideology and social order are embodied in everyday movement. In parallel, a practice-based approach has been developed by choreographer Michael Kliën, dramaturg Steve Valk, writer Jeffrey Gormly, and collaborators. Other scholars and theorists, including Bojana Cvejić, Ana Vujanović, Gabriele Klein, Randy Martin have used the term in relation to public space, protest, collective embodiment, and political participation.

Although these approaches share concerns, they differ substantially in emphasis and method. From a practitioner perspective, the term spans a range of dance-adjacent, community-engaged, and participatory practices, each of which retain distinct theoretical orientations.

== Definitions and uses ==
In practice-based contexts, social choreography refers to choreographic approaches that organize conditions for collective interaction beyond conventional dance performance. Drawing on Gregory Bateson's systems theory and cybernetic epistemology, Michael Kliën describes choreography as "the workings and governance of patterns, dynamics, and ecologies," and the practice of "setting relations or the conditions for relations to emerge." Bateson's cybernetic and ecological thought, including his arguments in Steps to an Ecology of Mind (1972) and Mind and Nature (1979) describes the mind as distributed across relational systems rather than located in individuals, showing how the observer is always entangled with the system under inquiry. Social choreography is thus an applied aesthetic practice operating within social and institutional environments. It can be distinguished from social engineering by virtue of its creative and non-deterministic qualities rather than a managerial one.

Other scholarly uses of the term emphasize choreography as an analytical framework. Andrew Hewitt's Social Choreography (2005) examines choreography as a means through which ideology is embodied in everyday life and social order historically rehearsed. Scholars who contributed to TkH / Walking Theory, including Bojana Cvejić, Ana Vujanović, and Gabriele Klein, have examined social choreography in relation to protest movements, public assembly, participation, and collective behavior.

== Practice-based development ==
The practice-based lineage developed through projects including Daghdha Dance Company in Limerick, Ireland, where Michael Kliën served as artistic director and Steve Valk as resident dramaturge between 2003 and 2011. In 2005, they initiated Framemakers, a public think tank bringing together artists, scholars, ecologists, theologians, and writers in dialogue with choreographic practice, whose aim was to "embody and foster a new understanding of choreography as the creative act of setting humans, actions, ideas and thoughts in relation to one another." Bradford Keeney's Aesthetics of Change (1983), which describes minds as "conversational patterns" and bodies as "the participants in the conversation," was foundational to this group's understanding of embodiment and collective knowledge. The project was documented in Framemakers: Choreography as an Aesthetics of Change (2005) and later expanded through Book of Recommendations: Choreography as an Aesthetics of Change (2008). The Framemakers booklet has been cited as an early formal articulation of social choreography's conceptual framework.

The lineage has also been associated with experimental environments connected to Ballett Frankfurt under William Forsythe, where Valk worked as head dramaturge and creative collaborator from 1992 to 2004. Forsythe's work explored choreography beyond theatrical dance performance and into participatory and public environments. His "Choreographic Objects" are examples of installations and environments designed to extend choreographic explorations beyond the stage to public spaces and the layperson. Among these, Tight Roaring Circle / White Bouncy Castle (1997) was an example of a choreographic environment in which "there are no spectators, only participants." Between 2000 and 2003, Valk collaborated with Forsythe, artist Heiner Blum, and students from the Hochschule für Gestaltung Offenbach (HfG) on Schmalclub, a regular event series at the Bockenheimer Depot in Frankfurt, which was characterized as "neither theater, party, exhibition, event, nor performance, but 'a piece of life.'" In Expanded Choreographies - Choreographic Histories (2022), Anna Leon situates Forsythe's choreographic objects within a broader transhistorical account of choreography exceeding dancing human bodies, to which the practice-based lineage of social choreography belongs.

Subsequent institutional developments initiated by the practice-based lineage include the Institute for Social Choreography in Frankfurt (2012), the Ricean School of Dance in Hydra, Greece (2014–2017), and the Laboratory for Social Choreography at Duke University, established in 2020 at the Kenan Institute for Ethics.

== Scholarly genealogies ==
Scholars have identified several overlapping genealogies of social choreography. One genealogy is associated with Andrew Hewitt's work in performance theory and critical theory. Another emerged from practice-based developments connected to Kliën, Valk, Gormly, and related institutional projects. A third genealogy has been traced by scholars including Bojana Cvejić, Ana Vujanović, Gabriele Klein, Marta Popivoda, and Randy Martin, whose work has examined social choreography in relation to protest, public space, collectivity, and political participation. More broadly, the idea of "expanded choreographies" has argued that the evolution of choreography must be considered within broader historical developments beyond the scope of dance performance.

in the academic journal TkH / Walking Theory, social choreography was analyzed from a number of scholarly perspectives. Bojana Cvejić examined how choreographic thinking has expanded to organize social knowledge across multiple fields, engaging practice-based instances including the Framemakers project as evidence of choreography's capacity to reconstitute social intelligence. Gabriele Klein analyzed social choreography at the intersection of aesthetic practice and political participation, examining how the corporeal dynamics of collective gathering in public space constitute forms of democratic action in relation to the post-2011 global protest landscape of Occupy, the Arab Spring, and anti-austerity movements. Related research produced Marta Popivoda's documentary Yugoslavia, How Ideology Moved Our Collective Body (2013), which uses social choreography as a dramaturgical framework to examine Yugoslav mass performances between 1945 and 2000.

Elsewhere, Kirsi Monni has published peer-reviewed research on choreography in social spaces and relational environments, situating social choreography within broader discussions of posthumanism, materiality, and embodied relationality. Finally, empirical research in cognitive and social psychology has provided partial corroboration of some foundational claims of the practice-based lineage. For example, a 2018 study found that distributed coordination of group movement dynamics, rather than unison synchrony, predicts pro-social behavior and group affiliation.

== Major works ==
The most frequently produced work from the practice-based lineage of social choreography is Parliament, first commissioned in 2014 and later presented at institutions including the Nasher Museum of Art at Duke University (2018), the CUNY Graduate Center in New York (2018), and the Benaki Museum in Athens (2025). The project places participants together in a shared space for extended periods without spoken language or predetermined goals, exploring collective attention and social relation through embodied, choreographic means. Cory Tamler's book-length study A Permanent Parliament: Notes on Social Choreography (Martin E. Segal Theatre Center, CUNY Graduate Center, 2022) documents the work through participant testimonies and situates its theoretical propositions spanning choreography, systems theory, and political theory.

== See also ==
- Participatory art
- Social practice (art)
- Relational art
- Systems theory
- Gregory Bateson
- Embodied cognition
- Michael Klien
- Gabriele Klein
- William Forsythe
- Randy Martin
- Choreography
- Applied theater
