= Leopold Plotek =

Canadian artist (born 1948)

- Born: 1948 (age 77–78); Moscow, USSR
- Education: McGill University; Sir George Williams University; Slade School of Fine Art

Leopold Plotek (born 1948), combines abstraction and figuration in large format paintings which take as their starting point his memories, his experience of architecture, objects and art (he mentions Picabia, Cubism and other sources as important), as well as his readings in art, history (often Soviet), and poetry of all periods. His works of the late 1970s were influenced by Adrian Stokes writings, especially Stones of Rimimi (1934), and in the 1980s by object relations theory in general. His references are often elliptically treated however, as he develops ways of painting them according to his own recipe which varies, picture to picture. In this singular pictorial dynamic, each painting is basically a conception on its own, though a series of sorts can exist. As a result, certain of Plotek’s paintings prefigure the practice of many contemporary abstract painters and can be viewed, like them, as extending the range of abstraction.

== Early years ==
Plotek was born in Moscow, USSR, and grew up in Poland. His parents spent much of the Second World War in Ukbekhestan, Tashkent, to which Plotek credits the family's survival as Jews. He left Poland with his parents, emigrating with them to Canada in 1960. He was educated in Montreal at McGill University (Classics) (1966), received his B.F.A. at Sir George Williams University (today Concordia University), in Montreal where he studied with Yves Gaucher and Roy Kiyooka (1970) and took additional study at the Slade School of Fine Art, London, with William Townsend (1970–1971).

== Career ==
He participated in Quebec 75 (1975), with seventeen other artists and held a solo show (1976) at Concordia University when Georges Bogardi reviewed his work. In 1979, he was included as one of the six artists in 6 Propositions at the Montreal Museum of Fine Arts (MMFA), where he was considered the odd man out because of his adherence to the figure. In 1988, he participated in a show with Susanna Heller and Medrie MacPhee at Southern Alberta Art Gallery, Alberta. He has had an extensive exhibition history, both solo and group.

In 2014, a solo at McMaster Museum of Art, McMaster University, included Plotek's "History Paintings" curated by Ben Portis and selections from the Sovfoto Archive at the MacLaren Art Centre as parts of the exhibition, Workingman's Dead: Lives of the Artists. Beginning in the 1990s, Plotek’s History Paintings revived something of the lost representational conceptions of painting in the 18th and 19th centuries, which he often applied to his imaginings of Soviet era scenes from the lives of various prominent figures such as Shostakovich and Isaac Babel. He painted himself as a baby with his nanny in the Hotel Metropole in Moscow, which was filled with party elite, and housed, in passing, various political prisoners and their keepers. In 2017, the Koffler Centre of the Arts, Toronto, presented Leopold Plotek: No Work, Nor Device, Nor Knowledge, Nor Wisdom, curated by E.C. Woodley, which surveyed five decades of the artist's practice. A catalogue was published with an essay by E.C. Woodley (ISBN 798-1-928175-13-1). The exhibition showcased paintings from 1979 to the present, with his most recent works alongside important earlier canvases. His work has been featured as well in numerous group exhibitions over the years, most notably at the inaugural exhibition of the National Gallery of Canada (1988), the Montreal Museum of Fine Arts (1980), and the Musée d'art contemporain de Montréal (MAC) (1981, 1982, 2017, 2020 [curator: Mark Lanctôt]).

His work is represented in major Canadian public collections including the National Gallery of Canada, Ottawa; the Musée d’art contemporain de Montréal; the Musée national des beaux-arts du Québec, Québec City; and the Canada Council for the Arts, Ottawa. Plotek is represented by the Corkin Gallery in Toronto.

He lives in Montreal and teaches at Concordia University in the Fine Arts, Studio faculty.

== Bibliography ==
- Nasgaard, Roald (2008). Abstract Painting in Canada. Douglas & McIntyre. ISBN 9781553653943.
