= Schooling and the Struggle for Public Life =

1988 book by Henry Giroux about pedagogy

- Author: Henry Giroux
- Subject: Critical pedagogy
- Genre: non-fiction
- Publisher: University of Minnesota Press
- Publication date: 1988
- Publication place: United States
- Pages: 257
- ISBN: 9780816617067
- Dewey Decimal: 320.4 or 370.11

Schooling and the Struggle for Public Life is a non-fiction book about critical pedagogy by Henry Giroux. In the book Giroux analyzes and critiques various concepts of pedagogy, arguing that schools should not be subservient to the existing power structure but should instead be sites of struggle and exist in solidarity with the oppressed. He adopts the framework of citizenship education, defining citizenship as the struggle for empowerment.

The book was originally published in 1988 under the title Schooling and the Struggle for Public Life: Critical Pedagogy in the Modern Age by University of Minnesota Press. An updated edition with a new preface was published in 2005 by Paradigm Publishers, with the title Schooling and the Struggle for Public Life: Democracy's Promise and Education's Challenge.

Schooling and the Struggle for Public Life received mixed reviews. While reviewers generally praised Giroux's analysis of education and democracy, some reviewers criticized the lack of analysis of Giroux's own arguments in the book, as well as the lack of discussion of how the arguments could be implemented.

== Background ==
Before writing Schooling and the Struggle for Public Life, Henry Giroux authored and co-authored several other books related to what he characterized as an ongoing crisis in education. As a radical democrat, Giroux argued against the pursuit of apoliticism in public education, extending the ideas of John Dewey and similar thinkers who presented schools as core institutions of democracy.

== Publication ==
Schooling and the Struggle for Public Life was first published in 1988 by University of Minnesota Press, as a 257-page book with the full title Schooling and the Struggle for Public Life: Critical Pedagogy in the Modern Age. This edition was republished in 1989 by Routledge, and was translated to the Spanish language as La escuela y la lucha por la ciudadanía for publication by Siglo XXI Editores in 1993.

An updated edition of the book, with a new preface, was published by Paradigm Publishers in 2005. The new edition was retitled Schooling and the Struggle for Public Life: Democracy's Promise and Education's Challenge.

== Synopsis ==
Schooling and the Struggle for Public Life contains Henry Giroux's critical analysis of various political conceptions of pedagogy. Giroux criticizes positions across the political spectrum including the conservative and New Right perspectives on education along with various liberal and leftist views. He adopts the concept of citizenship education from conservative pedagogy, rejecting what he describes as the tendency of leftist theorists to "downplay citizenship as an emancipatory category", but also rejects uncritical patriotism and its association with citizenship. Instead, he defines citizenship as the ongoing pursuit of empowerment. In connection with this definition, he states that the goal of education is "elimination of those ideological and material conditions that promote various forms of subjugation, segregation, brutality, and marginalization."

While distinguishing his argument from cultural relativism, which he describes as not sufficiently critical, Giroux argues that schools should be sites of struggle into which identity, social change, and empowerment are incorporated. He criticizes the existing structure of education in the United States as subservient to the broader structure of power, stating that "notions of struggle, debate, community, and democracy have become subversive categories" as a result of their subservience to the status quo structure of society. He additionally argues that education should be liberatory and schools should maintain active solidarity with oppressed groups.

Although a teacher cannot demand that a student not be racist, he/she can certainly subject such a position to a critique that reveals it as an act of political and moral irresponsibility related to wider social and historical social practices.

— Henry Giroux, Schooling and the Struggle for Public Life, p. 67

Within these broad themes, Giroux spends the second chapter of Schooling and the Struggle for Public Life discussing ethics, morals, and values in education. He argues that progressive and radical educators should engage with ethical issues, but should not simply dictate what is right and wrong, instead suggesting a focus on critical analysis of whether or not certain actions are politically and morally responsible. In another chapter, Giroux analyzes teacher education, which he argues should focus on "Teacher Education as Cultural Politics" and critical pedagogy rather than simply rules and regulations.

=== Updated edition preface ===
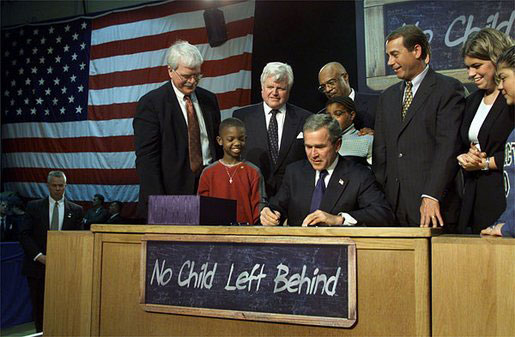
George W. Bush signing the No Child Left Behind Act into law in 2002

In the preface to the 2005 updated edition of the book, Giroux criticizes the presidential administration of George W. Bush, stating that the administration's focus on job training and standardization has further damaged the education system and brought about a militaristic form of education. He asserts that critical pedagogy remains a solution to the problems of education and encourages educators to consider themselves activists participating in a political process with the goal of emancipation and better public life for all.

== Reception ==
=== First edition ===
Publishers Weekly reviewed Schooling and the Struggle for Public Life positively, describing it as a "perceptive, piquant proposal for educational reform". The review noted the influence of "Marxism, feminism, liberation theology and the pedagogical theories of Paulo Freire" and similar figures.

In The Personalist Forum, A. J. Mandt gave the book a mixed review, broadly praising Giroux's analysis of core problems with democracy and education but criticizing the lack of deep exploration of the book's central concepts. Mandt noted that Giroux analyzed educational philosophies with which he disagreed in more detail than his own main themes, and stated that at certain points in his argument "it seems like Giroux regards the explicit politicization of schools as an end in itself", which "shows no regard [...] for the ways in which certain forms of knowledge" such as science seek to be objective. Mandt concluded that despite its "uncritical, 'romantic' view of struggles against social, cultural, and political oppression", Schooling and the Struggle for Public Life was an important book which surpassed others "that appear completely ignorant of these central problems of democracy".

Alice Crawford analyzed the arguments of Schooling and the Struggle for Public Life in a negative review in Social Epistemology, finding that "while initially appearing as a critique of the 'civic humanist' approach to pedagogical theory, [the book] in fact reproduces the civic humanist position in a number of essential respects". Drawing on William Fusfield's critique of civic humanist pedagogy, Crawford described three "tensions" in Giroux's argument: "the tension between explicitly disavowing reproduction as an appropriate model of pedagogy while implicitly embracing it in the form of indoctrination ... between claiming to reject absolute values while positing absolutes in the guise of a 'provisional morality' ... between the Utopian possibilities of the project in theory and the rather less optimistic possibility of its implementation". She concluded that the book leaves the reader with "a call to arms but nothing to arm ourselves with".

=== Second edition ===
After the publication of the second edition of Schooling and the Struggle for Public Life in 2005, Jonathan Segol reviewed the book positively in the Canadian Journal of Education. Noting that the book was originally published in the 1980s when "those in critical pedagogy circles most likely found much in the rightward drift of American politics that drove them to become more – well, critical", Segol stated that "things have only gotten worse in those respects", agreeing with Giroux's assertion in the new preface that the book was "more useful" in 2005. Segol praised Giroux's fusion of critical pedagogy and cultural studies, and concluded that "Giroux's take on education is making more sense than ever".

In Teachers College Record, Aaron Cooley wrote a mixed review of the book. While praising Giroux's "passionate writing style" of "poetic polemics" along with much of the book's content "that is essentially irrefutable for progressive supporters of public education", Cooley stated that he was "troubled by the ideological and intellectual insularity of sections of [Giroux's] narrative". While noting that "the consistent message that comes through is that public schools need to be catalysts for social change that will make society fairer and more just", Cooley criticized the lack of "substantive discussion about how to overcome the opposing forces that strongly object to his future for public schools and teachers" in the book. He additionally pointed out that "the democratic will of the people has not sought to make schools into the engines of social change [Giroux] suggests", questioning how the changes suggested in Schooling and the Struggle for Public Life could be made in a democratic manner.

A negative review in Teaching Sociology by Thomas Brignall found Schooling and the Struggle for Public Life "best suited for graduate school classes", noting that its "language density and structure [...] occasionally make reading it an arduous task" but nevertheless finding it potentially useful for teachers, students, and student organizers. Turning to content, Brignall praised the "basic premise" of the book but found that it was "not without flaws". He disliked the book's focus on criticism of the status quo rather than the presentation of solutions, and stated that the text of the updated edition was largely the same as the original edition. With regard to support for critical pedagogy, Brignall found the book "a diminutive attempt" because of its lack of appeal to "those with neutral, uninformed, or oppositional perspectives on education", and described some of Giroux's arguments as simple or even circular in nature.
