= Michael Klien =

Michael Kliën
- Born: 1973 (age 52–53); Vienna, Austria
- Education: Laban Centre, London
- Occupations: Choreographer, artist, theorist

Michael Kliën (born Michael Klien, 1973, Vienna) is an Austrian choreographer, artist, and theorist working across performance and visual art. His work has been associated with a reconceptualization of choreography as a relational practice distinct from dance, reframing it as the organization of relations between bodies, environments, and institutions rather than the composition of movement. This approach has extended into the development of social choreography as a field of practice and inquiry, most notably through the long-running participatory work Parliament (2014–). Since 2017 he has been a professor at Duke University, where he is founding director of the Laboratory for Social Choreography at the Kenan Institute for Ethics.

== Career ==
Kliën began his choreographic career in London, where he co-founded the interdisciplinary collective Barriedale Operahouse in 1994. In the late 1990s and early 2000s he worked as a guest choreographer with Ballett Frankfurt under William Forsythe, collaborating with Steve Valk and Jeffrey Gormly on works that explored generative and system-based approaches to choreography. The music for these and the majority of his subsequent choreographic works was composed by his brother Volkmar Klien, with commissions by Ballett Frankfurt and Volksoper Wien. From 2003 to 2011 he served as Artistic Director of Daghdha Dance Company in Limerick, Ireland, during which time he and Gormly co-authored, with Valk, the Book of Recommendations: Choreography as an Aesthetics of Change (2008). In 2013 he co-founded R.I.C.E. on the island of Hydra, Greece, together with Vitoria Kotsalou, with whom he continues to co-direct the initiative. Since 2017 he has been a professor at Duke University, where he was the inaugural director of the Dance MFA program and founding director of the Laboratory for Social Choreography at the Kenan Institute for Ethics.

== Reconceptualizing choreography and dance ==
Kliën's work centers on redefining choreography as the organization of relations rather than the composition of movement. In the Framemakers project (2005), choreography was described as "the creative act of setting the conditions for things to happen," extending its scope beyond the arrangement of movement.

This reconceptualization has been associated with a reconsideration of the relationship between choreography and dance, in which choreography is treated as an autonomous system and dance as a practice not fully determined by choreographic prescription. This position was developed in Propositions: To Dance Differently (2012) and, with Steve Valk, in Dance as a Metaphor for Thought. It was explored practically through works including Einem, Sediments of an Ordinary Mind, and Excavation Site: Martha Graham U.S.A.

This approach is informed by systems thinking and theories of recursive epistemology, particularly the work of Gregory Bateson, linking choreography to broader frameworks of relational knowledge and ecological thinking.

Related approaches to choreography as relational and process-based practice have been developed within contemporary theory, including in the work of Erin Manning, situating choreography within broader discussions of movement, perception, and relational systems.

== Early work and generative systems ==
Works including Duplex (2002–03) and Einem were commissioned and produced by Ballett Frankfurt. Duplex employed custom software and rule-based systems to generate choreographic structures in real time, interpreted live by dancers. These works have been discussed within the context of dance and technology as part of early explorations of computational and system-based choreography.

== Social choreography ==
The Framemakers project, hosted by Daghdha Dance Company, extended choreographic thinking into public space and collective processes, examining how the conditions for social change could be set rather than prescribed. His work during this period has been associated with the development of social choreography, examining how relations between bodies, environments, and institutions are structured and experienced.

His practice has also been presented in visual art contexts, including Slattery's Lamp at the Irish Museum of Modern Art (IMMA) and the solo exhibition Silent Witness.

== Laboratory for Social Choreography ==
Kliën is the founding director of the Laboratory for Social Choreography at the Kenan Institute for Ethics, Duke University.

The Laboratory advances choreography as a form of embodied inquiry, bringing together artists, scholars, and participants to explore social and ecological systems through movement-based practices.

== Parliament ==
Parliament (2014–) is a large-scale social choreographic work functioning as a participatory site in which participants collectively explore human relations through structured movement and wordless interaction. In 2022, the Martin E. Segal Theatre Center at CUNY published A Permanent Parliament: Notes on Social Choreography, authored by Cory Tamler, which documented the conceptual development of the work.

In 2025, Parliament was presented as a large-scale exhibition at the Benaki Museum in Athens, running for seven weeks.

== Family ==
Kliën's brothers include comedian and television presenter Peter Klien, known in Austria for the satirical programme Gute Nacht Österreich, and composer Volkmar Klien. While the other two brothers retained the original family spelling, Michael added the umlaut to ensure correct pronunciation of his name in international contexts.

== Selected works ==
- Duplex (2002–03, Ballett Frankfurt)
- Einem (Ballett Frankfurt)
- Nodding Dog (2001, Volksoper Wien)
- Sediments of an Ordinary Mind (2004)
- Slattery's Lamp (Irish Museum of Modern Art)
- Silent Witness (IMMA)
- Choreography for Blackboards (2010), American premiere at Performance Space 122's Coil festival, New York, 2012; reviewed in the New York Times.
- Parliament (2014–)
- Excavation Site: Martha Graham U.S.A. (2016), co-presented with the New Museum and the Martha Graham Dance Company at PS122's Coil festival, New York; reviewed in the New York Times and the Brooklyn Rail.
- The Utopians (2023)
