= Mary Teichman =

American artist and printmaker

Mary Teichman (born 1954) is an American artist and printmaker known for her color aquatint etchings.

== Biography ==
Mary Teichman studied printmaking, painting and drawing at The Cooper Union for the Advancement of Science and Art, graduating in 1976. Among her notable instructors were Charles Klabunde, Armando Morales and Stephano Cusumano. While in college, she worked as an apprentice for Klabunde in his West Village etching studio, learning first-hand the tools of the trade. During her subsequent years in New York City, she spent several years at Bob Blackburn's Printmaking Workshop on 17th Street, honing her technique and style. While there she also served as a master printer and platemaker for other artists, including the painters Medrie MacPhee and Nell Blaine. She later established her own etching studio at 41 Union Square.

Teichman's work has been shown in more than 250 invitational and juried exhibitions, and is in the permanent collections of museums, libraries and archives across the US and the world. She is a long-time member of the Boston Printmakers, as well as the Society of American Graphic Artists, which conferred a Lifetime Achievement Award upon her in 2019. In 1992, The Print Club of Albany selected her as its "Presentation Print" artist, commissioning her to produce an edition of prints for their members, and in 2018 and 2020, she was chosen as a finalist for the Rene Carcan International Prize for Printmaking, exhibiting her work in Brussels. In 2015, the Curator of Prints and Photographs at the Boston Athenaeum commissioned her to produce a special edition print for their permanent collection. Teichman has also created original etchings for three children's books published by Harper/Collins: Stars for Sarah, by Ann Turner; Color by Christina Rossetti; and Merry Christmas, A Victorian Verse.

== Collections ==
- The Brooklyn Museum, Brooklyn, NY
- The Boston Athenæum, Boston, MA
- THE MUSEUM OF THE CITY OF NEW YORK, New York, NY
- THE NEW YORK PUBLIC LIBRARY PRINT COLLECTION, New York, NY
- THE MUSEUM OF ART, CARNEGIE INSTITUTE, Pittsburgh, PA
- THE BOSTON PUBLIC LIBRARY, Boston, MA
- THE NEWARK PUBLIC LIBRARY, Newark NJ
- THE MUSEUM OF ART AND ARCHEOLOGY, Columbia, MO
- SYRACUSE UNIVERSITY ART MUSEUM, Syracuse, NY
- BINGHAMTON UNIVERSITY ART MUSEUM, Binghamton, NY

== Selected exhibitions ==
- 2021: PRINT INTERNATIONAL TY PAWB, Wrexham, Wales, UK
- 2020: RENE CARCAN INTERNATIONAL PRIZE FOR PRINTMAKING EXHIBIT, Bibliotheca Wittockiana, Brussels, Belgium
- 2019: NATIONAL ORIGINAL PRINT EXHIBITION, Royal Society of Painter Printmakers, Bankside Gallery, London
- 2018: RENE CARCAN INTERNATIONAL PRIZE FOR PRINTMAKING EXHIBIT, Bibliotheca Wittockiana, Brussels, Belgium
- 2017: NEW ENGLAND ON PAPER, The Boston Athenaeum, Boston, MA
- 2014: BOSTON PRINTMAKERS SMALL PRINT SHOW, The Print Centre, University of Alberta, Edmonton, Canada
- 2008: TAIWAN INTERNATIONAL INVITATIONAL MINI PRINTS, Taiwan Normal University, Taipei, Taiwan
- 2006: THE SOCIETY OF AMERICAN GRAPHIC ARTISTS, Hollar Studio Gallery, Prague, Czech Republic
- 2006: 52 ARTISTS FROM NEW YORK, The Graphic Studio Gallery, Dublin, Ireland
- 1996: THE NATIONAL ACADEMY OF DESIGN ANNUAL EXHIBITION, New York, NY
- 1994: "RECENT ACQUISITIONS, PRESENTS OF THE PAST," The Museum of the City of New York, New York, NY
- 1986: THE NATIONAL ACADEMY OF DESIGN ANNUAL EXHIBITION, New York, NY
- 1986 to present: THE SOCIETY OF AMERICAN GRAPHIC ARTISTS ANNUAL MEMBER EXHIBIT, New York, NY
- 1984: PRINTS FROM THE NEW YORK PRINTMAKING WORKSHOP, Harward Salon, Taipei
- 1982 to present: THE BOSTON PRINTMAKERS ANNUAL MEMBER EXHIBIT, Boston, MA
- 1981: THE BROOKLYN MUSEUM "100 New Acquisitions," Brooklyn, NY
- 1981: THE NATIONAL ACADEMY OF DESIGN ANNUAL EXHIBITION, New York, NY

== Solo exhibitions ==
- 2019: CROSSINGS AND TRANSPOSITIONS, Guangzhou Fine Art Academy Museum, Guangzhou, China
- 2015: ARGOS GALLERY, Santa Fe, NM
- 2014: THE OLD PRINT SHOP, New York, NY
- 2005: THE OLD PRINT SHOP, New York, NY
- 1991: A CLEAN, WELL-LIGHTED PLACE, New York, NY
- 1991: FITZGERALD FINE ARTS, Alexandria, VA
- 1990: NEW ROCHELLE PUBLIC LIBRARY, New Rochelle, NY
- 1989: WOMEN ARTISTS SERIES, Douglas College, Rutgers University, New Brunswick, NJ
- 1987: UNIVERSITY OF MINNESOTA, Morris, MN
- 1987: ERNESTO MAYANS GALLERY, Santa Fe, NM
- 1985: ERNESTO MAYANS GALLERY, Santa Fe, NM
- 1982: GAGE GALLERY, Washington, DC
- 1982: A CLEAN, WELL-LIGHTED PLACE, New York, NY
- 1982: THE ASSOCIATED AMERICAN ARTISTS GALLERY NEW TALENT IN PRINTMAKING EXHIBIT, New York, NY and Philadelphia, PA

== Awards ==
- THE SOCIETY OF AMERICAN GRAPHIC ARTISTS ANNUAL AWARD FOR OUTSTANDING COMMITMENT AND CONTRIBUTIONS TO THE WORLD OF FINE ART PRINTMAKING, New York, NY, 2019
- The ARUN BOSE MEMORIAL AWARD IN INTAGLIO PRINTMAKING, The Society of American Graphic Artists 85th Members Print Exhibition 2019, New Public Library Special Collections, Newark, NJ, 2019
- THE KATHY CARACCIO PURCHASE PRIZE, Prints for the New Century, The Society of American Graphic Artists 84th Members Print Exhibition, Syracuse University Art Galleries, Syracuse, NY, 2018
- THE RINGHOLZ FOUNDATION VISUAL ARTS GRANT, 2016
- MARY AND JOHN VOLLMAN SPONSORSHIP, Delta National Small Prints Exhibition 2016, Bradbury Art Museum, Jonesboro, AR, 2016
- RECOGNITION FOR EXCELLENCE, First National Exhibition of Intaglio Prints, The New York Society of Etchers, The National Arts Club, New York, NY
- JOHN ROSS AWARD, The Society of American Graphic Artists 70th National Member's Exhibition, Susan Teller Gallery, New York, NY, 2004
- K. CARACCIO COLOR INTAGLIO PURCHASE AWARD, The Society of American Graphic Artists 69th National Exhibition, The Art Student's League, New York, NY, 2002
- ANNE STELE MARCH MEMORIAL AWARD, Pen and Brush 2002 Annual Graphics Exhibition, New York, NY, 2002
- ADELA LINTELMANN MEMORIAL AWARD, Pen and Brush Small Works Exhibition, New York, NY, 2001
- ELIZABETH FENN MEMORIAL AWARD, Pen and Brush Graphics and Watercolor Exhibition, New York, NY, 2001
- K. CARACCIO COLOR INTAGLIO AWARD, The Society of American Graphic Artists 68th National Exhibition, New York, NY, 2000
- JUROR'S COMMENDATION, The Boston Printmakers 24th Annual Member's Exhibition, Duxbury, MA, 1997
- SECOND PRIZE, Second Annual International Exhibition of Small Works on Paper, 1995
- JUROR'S COMMENDATION, The Boston Printmakers 44th North American Print Exhibition, 1993
- PRESENTATION PRINT ARTIST FOR 1993, The Print Club of Albany
- EVA HOUSTON WEAVER PURCHASE AWARD, Print Club of Albany 17th National Open Print Exhibition, 1992
- BOSTON PRINTMAKERS AWARD, Member's Exhibition, 1988
- THE E. WEYHE GALLERY PURCHASE AWARD, 62nd National Print Exhibition, 1986
- PURCHASE PRIZE, The Heart of America National Print Exhibition, 1986
- JUROR'S CASH AWARD, Texas Realism 1985, Texas Fine Arts Association, 1985
- THE OTIS PHILBROOK AWARD, 12th Annual Boston Printmaker's Member's Show, 1985
- PURCHASE PRIZE, Charlotte Printmakers Society Annual Print Exhibition, 1982
- JEROME FOUNDATION AWARD, 1982
- SPECIAL AWARD, The Print Club of Philadelphia Annual International Competition, 1981
- THE LESSING J. ROSENWALD CASH PRIZE, The Print Club of Philadelphia Annual International Competition, 1980
- HONORABLE MENTION, The National Arts Club 6th Graphic Exhibition, 1979

== Publications and Reviews ==
- THE NEW MEXICAN, "Pasatiempo Magazine, NIGHT VISION, by Michael Abatemarco, October 30, 2015
- PRINTMAKING REVOLUTION, by Dwight Pogue, pp. 177, 181-3, Random House, 2012
- EXPRESSIVE DRAWING, by Steven Aimone, pp. 184-5, Lark Books, 2009
- THE JOURNAL OF THE PRINT WORLD, "Art Werger and Mary Teichman Contemporary/ Artist Printmakers", Volume 28, #1, Winter 2005
- THE ART AND CRAFT OF HAND LETTERING, by Annie Cicale, Lark Books, 2004
- MERRY CHRISTMAS, a Victorian Verse, by Mary Teichman, HarperCollins, 1993
- COLOR, Poem by Christina Rossetti, etchings by Mary Teichman, HarperCollins, 1992
- STARS FOR SARAH, by Ann Turner, etchings by Mary Teichman, HarperCollins, 1991
- THE NEW YORK TIMES, "A Show Full of Eye Catchers" by William Zimmer, August 21, 1988
- THE NEW MEXICAN, "Pasatiempo Magazine, Visual Arts", by Nicole Plett, July 19, 1985,
- AMERICAN ARTISTS MAGAZINE, Emerging Artists, by Robin Longman, Vol. 48, Issue 505, pp. 34–5, August, 1984
- THE NEW YORK TIMES, "In the Arts: Critic's Choices", Sunday, June 27, 1982
- THE JOURNAL OF THE PRINT WORLD, "Presentation Print, Mary Teichman, The Print Club of Albany", Volume 16, #3, Summer 1993
- 22ND NATIONAL PRINTMAKING EXHIBITION/ THE BROOKLYN MUSEUM, p. 84, 1981
- THE PRINTWORLD DIRECTORY
