= Volkmar Klien =

Austrian artist and composer

- Born: 1971 (age 54–55); Hollabrunn, Lower Austria, Austria
- Education: University of Music and Performing Arts Vienna; University of Vienna; City, University of London (PhD)
- Occupations: Composer; Artist; Music educator
- Known for: Electroacoustic music, installations, sound art
- Relatives: Michael Klien (brother, choreographer); Peter Klien (brother, satirist)

Volkmar Klien (born 1971) is an Austrian composer, artist and music educator who works in electroacoustic and instrumental music, installations, software and performances. His work combines traditional musical practices with technology and sound exploration.

== Early life and education ==
Volkmar Klien was born in 1971 in Hollabrunn, Lower Austria, and grew up in Vienna. He studied composition at the University of Music and Performing Arts Vienna and philosophy at the University of Vienna. Between 1997 and 2002, he lived in London, where he completed a PhD in electroacoustic composition from City, University of London.

== Career ==
=== Academic and research roles ===
Klien has held research positions at the Royal College of Art in London, the Austrian Research Institute for Artificial Intelligence (OFAI), and the University of Music and Performing Arts Vienna. Since 2015, he has been a professor of composition at the Anton Bruckner Private University in Linz, Austria.

=== Curatorial work ===
From 2009 to 2020, Klien curated electronic music at Alte Schmiede in Vienna. His curatorial work included the Stromschiene series of experimental music events.

== Artistic work ==
Klien's work includes electroacoustic and instrumental music, installations, software, and performances. His projects include:

- Nodding Dog (2001), a full-length ballet for Volksoper Wien, premiered on December 20, 2001, with choreography by his brother Michael Klien.
- Multi-channel electronic sound works for the Experimental Media and Performing Arts Center (EMPAC) in Troy, New York, including collaborations in 2009 and 2010.
- Aural Codes, an installation using London's radio sphere as an interactive exhibition space.
- A mixed media installation for Transitio_MX in Mexico City, acoustically surveying landscapes.
- The Stellas: A Fugue for Day Players (2025), a multichannel film featured at the Spring/Break Art Show.
- Are the Birds Happy?, an interactive performance with artists Simon Lee and Eve Sussman.

Klien collaborates with his brother Michael Klien, a choreographer, on projects performed at venues including ZKM Karlsruhe, Ballet Frankfurt, and the New Museum in New York City.

=== Media and broadcasting ===
Klien has contributed to several projects for ORF Kunstradio, including Gemeinsam stark / zusammen schwach (2018). From January to May 2021, he co-hosted the Ö1 podcast Die Klien-Brüder: Neue Musik im Härtetest with his brother Peter Klien, discussing contemporary music in an accessible format.

== Artistic approach ==
Klien's work combines traditional musical practices with technology-based sound exploration. His work addresses themes such as automated music and postdigital instrument design, focusing on the intersection of technology and contemporary musical practices.

== Awards and honors ==
Klien has received awards including:

- 1995 Gustav Mahler Kompositionspreis (Klagenfurt).
- 2002 Max Brand Preis for Electronic Music.
- 2009 Honorary Mention at Prix Ars Electronica.
- 2013 Niederösterreichischer Kulturpreis for Media Arts.
- 2017 Medienkunst-Preis der Stadt Wien.

== Discography ==
- Capital Must Accumulate, Löwenhertz
- Mahd im Berg, Löwenhertz
- Variations in Air Pressure, Aufstieg AV
- Start - Ziel - Siege, Aufstieg AV
- Lockerungen, Aufstieg AV
- Strom, Aufstieg AV
- VLCLEL, Aufstieg AV

== Personal life ==
Klien works with his brothers, Michael (choreographer) and Peter (satirist), on various artistic and media projects.
