= Stanley Aronowitz =

American academic and cultural critic (1933–2021)

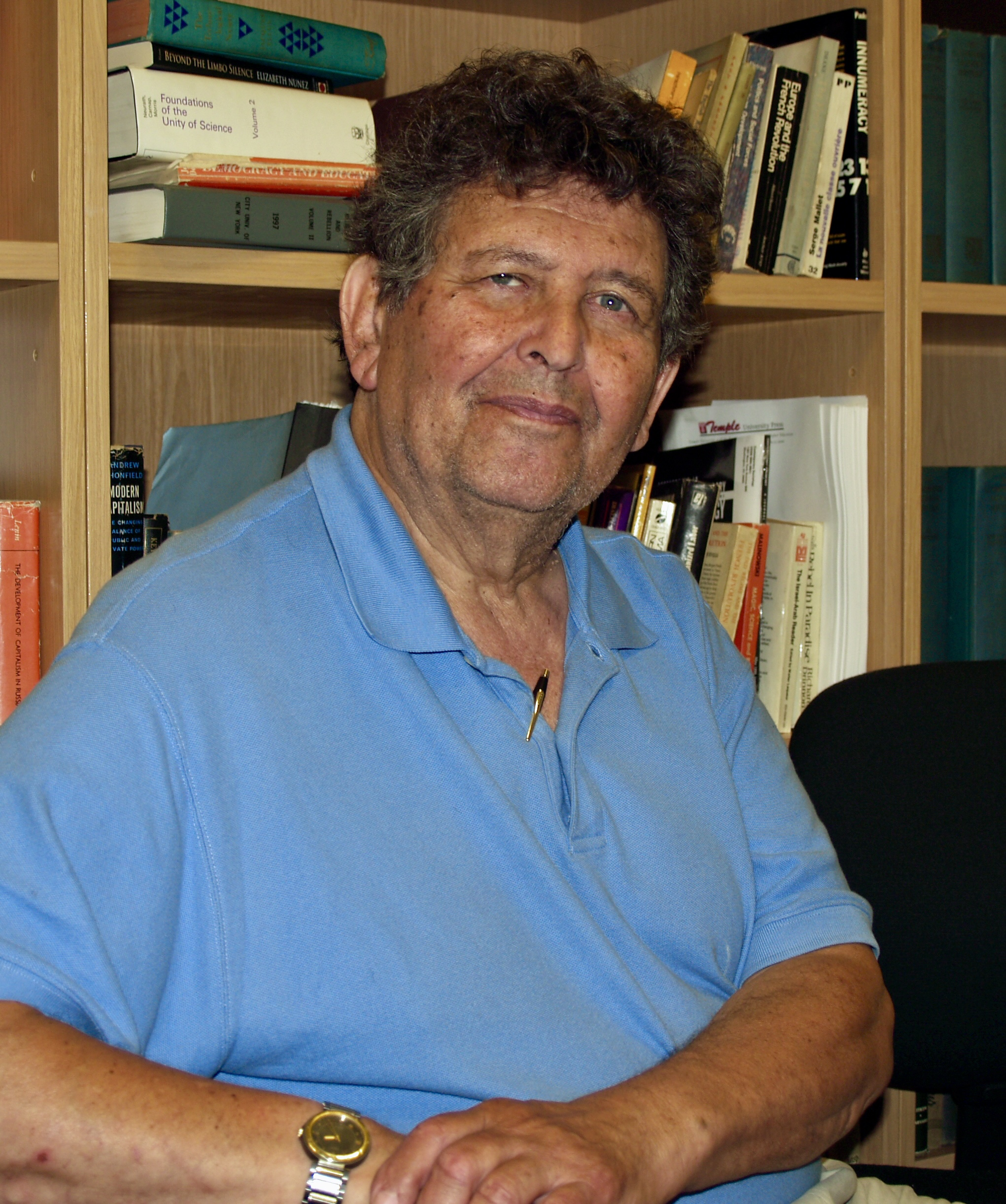
- Born: January 6, 1933; New York City, New York, US
- Died: August 16, 2021 (aged 88); New York City, New York, US
- Spouses: Jane O'Connell (div. 1962); Ellen Willis (m. 1998; died 2006)
- Children: Kim O'Connell; Michael O'Connell; Nona Willis-Aronowitz; Hampton Finer; Alice Finer

Academic background
- Education: New School for Social Research; Union Graduate School
- Thesis: Marxism, Technology and Labor (1975)
- Influences: Paulo Freire; C. Wright Mills; Herbert Marcuse

Academic work
- Discipline: Sociology; cultural studies
- Institutions: University of California, Irvine; Columbia University; Graduate Center, CUNY
- Doctoral students: Peter Bratsis; Bruno Gulli; Kristin Lawler; Randy Martin; Suzanna Danuta Walters; Cornel West
- Notable students: Immanuel Ness
- Main interests: Labor unions in the United States; education; technology; science studies

Stanley Aronowitz (January 6, 1933 – August 16, 2021) was an American sociologist, trade union official, and political activist. A professor of sociology, cultural studies, and urban education at the CUNY Graduate Center, his longtime political activism and cultural criticism was influential in the New Left movement of the 1960s, 1970s, and beyond. He was also an advocate for organized labor and a member of the interim consultative committee of the International Organization for a Participatory Society. In 2012, Aronowitz was awarded the Center for Study of Working Class Life's Lifetime Achievement Award at Stony Brook University.

== Biography ==
Born on January 6, 1933, and raised in New York City, Aronowitz attended public primary school in The Bronx before enrolling in The High School of Music & Art in Manhattan. He then attended Brooklyn College until being suspended by its administration for engaging in a demonstration. Instead of returning to school the next year, Aronowitz moved to New Jersey, where he worked at several metalworking factories.

Aronowitz became involved in the American labor movement in New Jersey, and in 1959, while laid off from his job as a metalworker, he found work with the New Jersey Industrial Union Council. Collaborating with the council's president, Aronowitz cowrote New Jersey's unemployment compensation law, subsequently enacted by the state legislature in 1961.

His work with the Industrial Union Council led to Aronowitz's appointment as director of the organizing and boycott department of the Amalgamated Clothing Workers of America. Aronowitz spent four years traveling throughout the United States to develop the union's campaigns.

At the beginning of the 1960s, he served as a campaign manager for New York Assemblyman, Mark Lane, a progressive Democrat.

In the 1960s, while employed with the Clothing Workers, Aronowitz began participating in the Civil Rights Movement. He engaged in lunch counter sit-ins and gave speeches on the labor movement's behalf to the Student Non-Violent Coordinating Committee on the confluence of African-American civil rights and economic issues.

Through his work in civil rights, Aronowitz secured the role of labor coordinator, appointed by Bayard Rustin, on the planning committee of the March on Washington for Jobs and Freedom in 1962–3. Aronowitz was tasked with soliciting the support of American labor unions for the march, and while encountering resistance from the majority of trade unions, most notably the AFL–CIO, he secured the endorsement of the United Auto Workers, United Packinghouse Workers of America, as well as rubber and clothing workers' unions.

== Writings ==
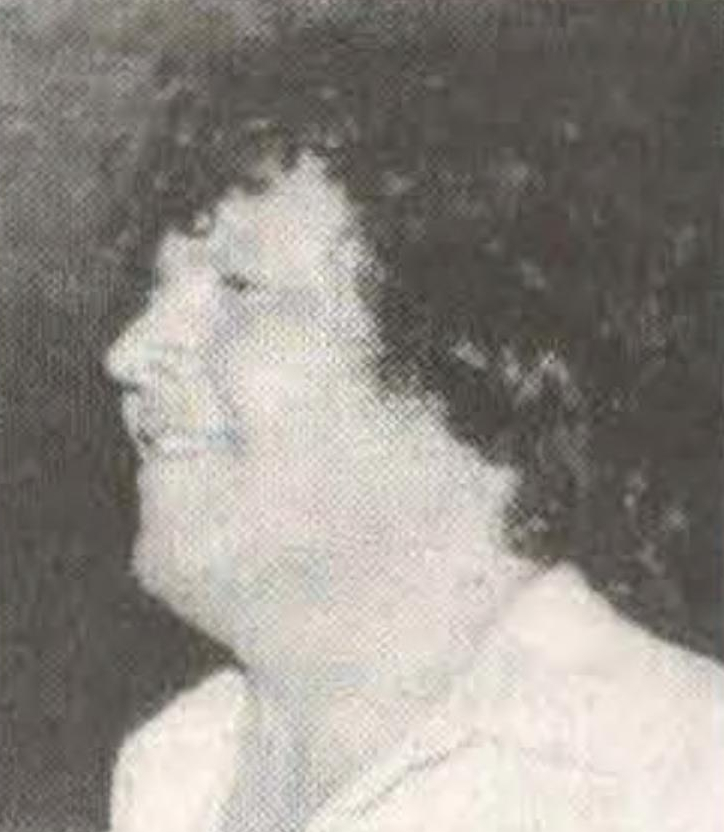
Aronowitz c. 1982

Aronowitz was the author of numerous books on class, culture, sociology of science, and politics. With Fredric Jameson and John Brenkman, he was a founding editor of Duke University's Social Text, a journal that is subtitled "Theory, Culture, Ideology". He defended the journal from criticism after it published a hoax article in its summer 1996 issue (see Sokal Affair).

In that article, he stated that with this publication, "Our objective was to interrogate Marxists' habitual separation of political economy and culture and to make a contribution to their articulation, even reunification." Aronowitz, however, was not a working editor at the time of the Sokal scandal and had not seen the paper before publication. In an interview in the Brooklyn Rail after the publication of Taking it Big: C. Wright Mills and the Making of Political Intellectuals, he cited Mills's influence on his beliefs when he states, "My own insights, as a result of my own experience as a worker, as a trade unionist, and as an activist, were stimulated and, to some extent, guided by Mills’s example. His three major books on American social structure—The New Men of Power, White Collar, and The Power Elite—together constitute a compelling intellectual program for our own times."

== 2002 gubernatorial campaign ==
In 2002, he was the Green Party of New York's nominee for governor. It was his first and only campaign for public office. He was just the second Green candidate for governor. Described as "The Anti-Candidate, Out To Anger The Rich" by the New York Times, he said of his campaign "My job is to start a public conversation, to show voters they have a choice and to get enough of a vote so we can stay on the ballot and speak out." In June 2002, his campaign had raised approximately $25,000 and was expected to raise just $150,000. His campaign finished in 5th place, receiving 41,797 votes (.89%).

== Other activities ==
In 1965 Aronowitz was one of the lecturers at the Free University of New York shortly after it was founded.

In 1976, Aronowitz (then living in San Diego and teaching at UC-Irvine, joined the New American Movement. In 2010, he would write a lengthy essay titled, "The New American Movement and Why It Failed" for the journal Work and Days.

In 2005 Aronowitz co-founded the journal Situations: Project of the Radical Imagination. He has also published articles in numerous publications and with a core group of intellectuals—faculty and students—at the Graduate Center, he spearheaded the effort to create the Center for Cultural Studies (now the Center for the Study of Culture, Technology and Work) in the spirit of fostering intellectual debate, multidisciplinarity, and the toppling of high cultural privilege in academia. In 1969, Aronowitz, Jeremy Brecher, Paul Mattick Jr., and Peter Rachleff, began sporadically publishing a magazine and pamphlet series called Root & Branch.

== Personal life ==
Aronowitz lived in New York City. He was first married to Jane O'Connell until divorcing in 1962 and was then married to Ellen Willis from 1998 until her death in November 2006. He had five children, including Nona Willis-Aronowitz.

Aronowitz died on August 16, 2021, from complications of a stroke, in Manhattan.

== Works ==
Aronowitz has authored, co-authored, or edited over 26 different books, as well as authored over 200 articles and reviews.

=== Bibliography ===
| Title | Publication Date | Publisher | ISBN |
|---|---|---|---|
| Honor America : The Nature of Fascism, Historic Struggles Against It and a Strategy for Today | 1970 | Times Change Press | ISBN 0878100113 |
| False Promises: The Shaping of American Working Class Consciousness | 1973 | McGraw-Hill Education | ISBN 0822311984 |
| Food, Shelter, and the American Dream | 1974 | Seabury Press | ISBN 082640104X |
| Crisis In Historical Materialism: Class, Politics, and Culture in Marxist Theory | 1981 | Praeger Publishers | ISBN 0897890116 |
| Working Class Hero : A New Strategy for Labor | 1983 | Adama Books | ISBN 0915361132 |
| Science as Power: Discourse and Ideology in Modern Society | 1988 | Palgrave Macmillan | ISBN 0816616590 |
| The Politics of Identity: Class, Culture, Social Movements | 1992 | Routledge | ISBN 0415904366 |
| Roll Over Beethoven: The Return of Cultural Strife | 1993 | Wesleyan University Press | ISBN 0819552550 |
| Dead Artists, Live Theories, and Other Cultural Problems | 1993 | Routledge | ISBN 0415907381 |
| Radical Democracy | 1994 | Blackwell | ISBN 1557865469 |
| The Death and Rebirth of American Radicalism | 1996 | Routledge | ISBN 0415912415 |
| From The Ashes Of The Old: American Labor and America's Future | 1998 | Basic Books | ISBN 0465004091 |
| The Knowledge Factory: Dismantling the Corporate University and Creating True Higher Learning | 2001 | Beacon Press | ISBN 0807031232 |
| How Class Works: Power and Social Movement | 2004 | Yale University Press | ISBN 0300105045 |
| C. Wright Mills | 2004 | SAGE Publications | ISBN 0761973710 |
| Just Around The Corner: The Paradox of the Jobless Recovery | 2005 | Temple University Press | ISBN 1592131387 |
| Left Turn: Forging a New Political Future | 2006 | Routledge | ISBN 1594513112 |
| The Last Good Job in America: Work and Education in the New Global Technoculture | 2007 | Rowman & Littlefield | ISBN 0742560260 |
| Against Schooling: For an Education That Matters | 2008 | Routledge | ISBN 1594515034 |
| Taking It Big: C. Wright Mills and the Making of Political Intellectuals | 2012 | Columbia University Press | ISBN 0231135408 |
| The Death and Life of American Labor: Toward a New Workers' Movement | 2014 | Verso Books | ISBN 1784783005 |
| Against Orthodoxy: Social Theory and its Discontents | 2015 | Palgrave Macmillan | ISBN 1137438878 |

=== Coauthored works ===
| Author(s) | Title | Publication Date | Publisher | ISBN |
|---|---|---|---|---|
| Jack Barnes, Stanley Aronowitz, Peter Camejo, Michael Harrington, George Breitman, and Carl Haessler | The Lesser Evil? Debates on the Democratic Party and Independent Working-Class Politics | 1977 | Pathfinder Press | ISBN 0873485181 |
| Stanley Aronowitz and Henry A. Giroux | Education Under Siege: The Conservative, Liberal and Radical Debate over Schooling | 1986 | Routledge | ISBN 0710213182 |
| Stanley Aronowitz and Henry A. Giroux | Postmodern Education: Politics, Culture, and Social Criticism | 1991 | University of Minnesota Press | ISBN 0816618801 |
| Stanley Aronowitz and Henry A. Giroux | Education Still Under Siege | 1993 | Bergin & Garvey | ISBN 0897893115 |
| Stanley Aronowitz and William DiFazio | Jobless Future: Sci-Tech and the Dogma of Work | 1995 | University of Minnesota Press | ISBN 0816621942 |

Party political offices
| Preceded by Al Lewis | Green Party of New York nominee for Governor of New York; 2002 | Succeeded by Malachy McCourt |
