= Paradigm Publishers =

Former American academic publisher

- Founded: 2003
- Successor: Routledge
- Country of origin: United States
- Headquarters location: Boulder, Colorado
- Publication types: Books, academic journals
- Nonfiction topics: Social science and the humanities
- Official website: paradigm.presswarehouse.com

Paradigm Publishers was an academic, textbook, and trade publisher in social science and the humanities based in Boulder, Colorado.

== History ==
Paradigm was founded in 2003 by Dean Birkenkamp. Its authors included Charles Tilly, Noam Chomsky, Henry Giroux, Pete Seeger, Kofi Annan, Howard Zinn and many influential academic writers. In 2015, the company was sold to Routledge, part of Taylor & Francis.

Since the acquisition, Paradigm's catalog and its mission to publish transformative, progressive works in the social sciences and humanities have been continued under the Routledge imprint. Routledge, being one of the world's leading academic publishers, has likely furthered the reach and impact of Paradigm's authors and their works through its global distribution network and digital platforms.
