= Nolan Higdon =

American scholar and media personality

- Born: Nolan Higdon; November 3, 1983 (age 42); Owensboro, Kentucky, U.S.
- Occupations: University Lecturer; Author; Podcaster; Filmmaker

Academic background
- Education: University of California, Davis, B.A. 2009, San Diego State University, M.A. 2012, San Francisco State University, Ed.D. 2017

Nolan Higdon (born November 3, 1983) is a critical media literacy scholar and media personality. He is an author and university lecturer of history, education, and media studies. Higdon is a lecturer at University of California, Santa Cruz and California State University, East Bay.

== Life ==
Higdon's education focused on History, Latin American Studies, and Critical Media Literacy Education. In the 2010s, Higdon began writing for Project Censored.

In 2019, Higdon co-wrote United States of Distraction Media Manipulation in Post-Truth America (And What We Can Do About It), with Mickey Huff. Higdon and Huff argue that the implementation of neoliberal policies in the 1970s created weaknesses in the U.S. news media system that Donald Trump exploited. They argued that a dramatic transformation of the U.S. media and education system were needed to strengthen American democracy. The text received mixed reviews.

In The Anatomy of Fake News: Critical News Literacy Education, Higdon argued that the U.S. has always wrestled with fake news. Rather than panic, democracies can mitigate the influence of fake news by making critical news literacy education available to the citizenry. Higdon warned that treating government regulation and censorship as a solution to fake news empowers corporations and government to determine what is true and what is false for citizens. Robin Blom mostly lauded Higdon for making “a convincing argument throughout the book about the need for critical approaches in news literacy education.” However, Blom lamented that “Higdon doubled down on using fake news. Whether he is talking about hoaxes, propaganda, or petty lies…The consistency is praiseworthy, but it also brings us back to square one: What is the actual value of the phrase in public discourse when applied to such a wide range of communication forms?” Wayne Journell celebrated Higdon's history of fake news arguing that it “provides much-needed context for those struggling to understand both the complexities of fake news and how we arrived at the misinformation era we find ourselves in.” Journell wrote “Higdon is at his strongest when providing historical context.” However, Journell's “main criticism” of the book was Higdon's “underlying assumption that consumers of information want accurate information.”

In The Podcaster's Dilemma: Decolonizing Podcasters in the Era of Surveillance Capitalism, Higdon and Nicholas L. Baham III surveyed a 100 podcasts to determine how media makers are using podcasting as a space of decolonization. In a review, L. Dugan Nichols said Higdon and Baham “excel at categorizing the gamut of subversive podcasting, informing readers how the hosts of various shows “confront dominant ideologies” (p. 6) through inquiry, criticism, and “cultural reformulation” (p. 6)—which entails the telling of narratives from a subaltern position.” However, Nichols' summation of the text was mixed, “Ultimately, The Podcaster’s Dilemma contains ambiguities and omissions that prevent a more nuanced exploration into the world of leftist podcasting. However, academics conducting research in this area would be remiss to neglect this book. It is an essential read for anyone seeking insight on the resistant potential of a digital medium.”

== Books ==
- United States of Distraction Media Manipulation in Post-Truth America (And What We Can Do About It), co-authored with Mickey Huff. City Lights Publishing, 2019.
- The Anatomy of Fake News: Critical News Literacy Education, University of California Press, 2020.
- The Podcasters’ Dilemma: Decolonizing Podcasters in the Era of Surveillance Capitalism, co-authored with Nicholas Baham III, Wiley Press, 2022.
- The Media and Me: A Guide to Critical Media Literacy for Young People, 13 December 2022, Triangle Square.
- MAGAcademy: How Corporatism Paved the Way for the Hostile Takeover of Higher Ed, Foreword by Henry Giroux; April 2026, Third Rail Communications. ISBN 9798218923174

== Selected publications ==
- 'Returning to Neoliberal Normalcy: Analysis of Legacy News Media's Coverage of the Biden Presidency's First 100 Days," co-authored with Emil Marmol and Mickey Huff, In Robert Gutsche Jr. (ed), The Future of the Presidency, Journalism, and Democracy: After Trump, (London: Routledge, 2022).
- "The Critical Effect: Exploring The Influence Of Critical Media Literacy Pedagogy On College Students' Social Media Behaviors and Attitudes," The Journal of Media Literacy Education. 2021
- "Curricular similarities and differences between critical and acritical media literacy: Supporting teachers' classroom inclusion," co-authored with Allison Butler and J.D. Swerzenski, Democratic Communique, 2021.
- "Time to put your marketing cap on: Mapping digital corporate media curriculum in the age of surveillance capitalism," co-authored with Allison Butler, Review of Education Pedagogy and Cultural Studies, 2021.
- "Today's Fake News is Tomorrow's Fake History," co-author Mickey Huff, Secrecy and Society Journal, Vol. 2, No. 2, 2021.
- "What is Fake News?: A Foundational Question for Developing Effective Critical News Literacy Education." Democratic Communiqué, Vol. 29, No. 1, April 2020.
- "Rallying Over Balloting: The Origins of Millennial Activism." Journal of Critical Thought and Praxis 8, no. 1 (2019): 3.
