= Noah Pickus =

American academic

Academic background
- Education: Wesleyan University (BA); Princeton University (PhD)

Academic work
- Institutions: Duke University; Duke Kunshan University

Noah Pickus is an American academic and professor, focused on patriotism and nationalism. Pickus is associate provost at Duke University and dean for academic strategy and learning innovation at Duke Kunshan University. He formerly served as chief academic officer for Minerva Project and director of Duke's Kenan Institute for Ethics.

Pickus co-authored The New Global Universities: Reinventing Education in the 21st Century with Bryan Penprase in 2023. The book profiles 8 new universities and colleges, including African Leadership University, Minerva University, Yale-NUS College (Singapore), Ashesi University (Ghana), NYU Abu Dhabi, Olin College of Engineering, Fulbright University Vietnam, and Ashoka University (India). Pickus and Penprase hosted the New Global Universities Summit in Washington, D.C. to convene representatives from new universities in June 2024.

== Publications ==
- Immigration and Citizenship in the Twenty-First Century (1998)
- True Faith and Allegiance: Immigration and American Civic Nationalism (2007)
- The New Global Universities: Reinventing Education in the 21st Century (2023)
