= William DiFazio =

American sociologist

- Born: 7 April 1947

William DiFazio (April 7, 1947 - March 2020) was an American professor of sociology at St. John's University. He completed research on work and technology, urban sociology, social theory. He authored several books and articles on domestic and global poverty, including, Ordinary Poverty: A Little Food and Cold Storage. He also co-hosted and co-produced the radio show, City Watch on WBAI 99.5 FM. He earned his PhD in sociology at the CUNY Graduate Center in 1981.

== Activism ==
DiFazio was involved in community activism for many decades. He participated in many groups and organizations during the American Civil Rights Movement in the 1960s including Students for a Democratic Society (SDS) and The Student Nonviolent Coordinating Committee (SNCC). An active voice in the fight against hunger, he was on the board of directors for the Hunger Action Network of New York State since 2000 and was on the board of directors for the St. John's Bread and Life Soup Kitchen of Brooklyn from 1994 to 2008.

== Honors and awards ==
In 2007, DiFazio's book, Ordinary Poverty, was nominated for the Harry Chapin Media Award, which honors print and electronic media for outstanding coverage on hunger and poverty. He served as Chair Elect (2006–2007) and Chair (2007–2008) of the Marxist Section of the American Sociological Association. In 2008, he received a Community Activist of the Year award from The People's Firehouse, Inc., a community-based, nonprofit organization in Brooklyn.

== Other activities ==
Along with his academic scholarship and authorship at St. John's University, DiFazio taught the texts of Karl Marx at the Brecht Forum in New York City. He was a co-producer and co-host of the show City Watch on local radio station WBAI 99.5 FM since March 2000. Along of a core group of intellectuals and local activists, he contributed to the journal Situations, co-founded by Stanley Aronowitz. He was also a contributor and member of the Fifteenth Street Manifesto Group, which has created and circulated a Manifesto for a Left Turn which calls for a radical, political formation. At the time of his death, he was researching and writing his book, Conversations in Diners: Ordinary People and the Crisis in Capitalism.

== Family life ==
DiFazio was originally from Brooklyn and lived there with his wife, Susanna Heller, a painter. He had one daughter, Liegia DiFazio, a lawyer.

== Works and Essays by William DiFazio ==
- An excerpt of Chapter 1 in Ordinary Poverty: A Little Food and Cold Storage
