= Nona Willis Aronowitz =

American author and editor (born 1984)

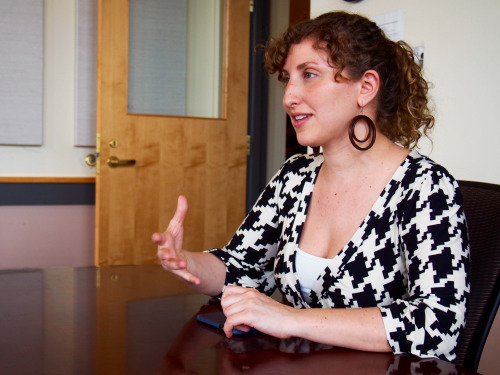
- Willis Aronowitz in c. 2012
- Born: 1984 (age 41–42); United States
- Education: Wesleyan University
- Occupations: Author; editor
- Movement: Feminism
- Spouse: Aaron Cassara (m. 2009, divorced)
- Parents: Stanley Aronowitz; Ellen Willis

Nona Willis Aronowitz (born 1984) is a New York-based writer and editor, whose work focuses on "women, sex, politics, and the economy". She was the sex and love advice columnist for Teen Vogue from 2019 to 2023. She is the author of Bad Sex, a 2022 memoir published by Plume-Penguin Random House, and served as an award-winning editor of collections of her mother's works. Aronowitz has worked for NBC, NPR, and other news venues, and her writings have appeared in The New York Times, the Washington Post, New York Magazine, The Guardian, and other venues.

== Early life and education ==
Aronowitz was born in 1984, and is the daughter of the late Ellen Willis, a journalist, writer on feminist and cultural issues, and NYU faculty member, and the late Stanley Aronowitz, a blue-collar organizer, writer, and CUNY faculty member.

She graduated from Wesleyan University with a degree in American studies in 2006.

== Career ==
Aronowitz has been a fellow at the Roosevelt Institute, worked as an education and poverty reporter at NBC News Digital, worked as an associate editor at GOOD magazine, and has written for various publications.

=== Writing and editing corpus ===
In 2009 Nona and Emma Bee Bernstein's book Girldrive: Criss-Crossing America, Redefining Feminism, about their drive across America talking with women about feminism and being women, was published.

In 2013, Aronowitz cofounded Tomorrow, a one-shot magazine about "creative destruction".

Aronowitz edited a collection of her mother’s work entitled The Essential Ellen Willis, which appeared in 2014. She also edited Out of the Vinyl Deeps (University of Minnesota Press, 2011), the first collection of Ellen Willis's music reviews and essays.

Aronowitz created and edited "The Slice", a features section at Talking Points Memo which began in 2015.

As of 2017, Aronowitz was the features editor for Splinter (previously Fusion) and writing the weekly newsletter "Fucking Through the Apocalypse".

In 2019, Aronowitz began writing a sex and relationships column for Teen Vogue.

Aronowitz is featured in the feminist history film She's Beautiful When She's Angry.

In October 2019, it was announced that Aronowitz had signed a book deal with Plume for a book called Bad Sex, “a blend of memoir, social history, and cultural criticism” that examines why, “despite the ubiquity of both sex and feminism, true sexual freedom remains elusive.”

== Awards and recognition ==
The one-shot magazine, Tomorrow, cofounded by Aronowitz, was nominated for an Utne Media Award for general excellence.

Aronowitz's collection of her mother's work, The Essential Ellen Willis, won the 2014 National Book Critics Circle Award for criticism.
