= Randy Martin =

Professor, socialist activist, and dancer

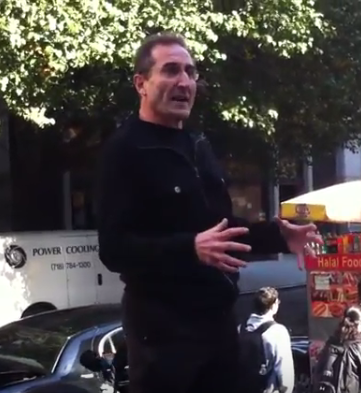
- Martin at the People's University in Washington Square Park on November 8, 2011
- Born: October 5, 1957
- Died: January 28, 2015 (aged 57); New York City, US
- Occupations: professor, scholar, dancer

Academic background
- Education: Ph.D.
- Alma mater: CUNY Graduate Center
- Thesis: Seeds of Desire: The Common Ground of Performance and Politics (Culture, Theater, Dance) (1984)
- Doctoral advisor: Stanley Aronowitz

Academic work
- Discipline: Sociology, Art
- Sub-discipline: Marxism, Dance theory
- Institutions: Tisch School of the Arts
- Main interests: Financialization, dance, debt, Marxism

Randy Martin (5 October 1957 – 28 January, 2015) was a professor of Art and Policy at New York University's Tisch School of the Arts, socialist activist, and dancer.

== Thought ==
Educated as a sociologist but with a background as a dancer, Martin's scholarship addresses intersections between art and politics. In Financialization of Daily Life, Martin examines how the shift toward financialization in the economy of the United States has subsequently affected culture, with a particular attention paid to the control of inflation and stimulation of economic growth.

== Bibliography ==
- Martin, Randy (December 4, 2001). On Your Marx: Relinking Socialism and the Left. Minneapolis: University of Minnesota Press. ISBN 0816638969.
- Martin, Randy (October 18, 2002). Financialization Of Daily Life. Labor in Crisis. Philadelphia: Temple University Press. ISBN 1439912246.
- Martin, Randy (March 14, 2007). An Empire of Indifference: American War and the Financial Logic of Risk Management. a Social Text book. Durham: Duke University Press. ISBN 978-0822339960.
- Martin, Randy (April 17, 2015). Knowledge LTD: Toward a Social Logic of the Derivative. Philadelphia: Temple University Press. ISBN 978-0816638963.
