= Gabriele Klein =

German sociologist, cultural theorist, and dance scholar

Gabriele Klein (born 1957) is a sociologist, cultural theorist, and dance scholar.

== Life ==
From 1977 to 1987 Gabriele Klein studied Social Sciences, History, Sports Sciences, Theater, Film, and Television Studies, Contemporary Dance and Education at the Universities of Bielefeld, Bochum and Essen, as well as in Amsterdam. She completed her Doctorate in Social Sciences at the Ruhr University Bochum in 1990. Her dissertation was published in 1992 under the title: Frauen Körper Tanz. Eine Zivilisationsgeschichte des Tanzes (Women Bodies Dance. A Civilization Theory of Dance). Since the publication of her dissertation, Gabriele Klein has been regarded as one of the pioneers of German dance studies.

She completed her habilitation in 1998 with a thesis entitled Electronic Vibration. Pop Kultur Theorie (Electronic Vibration. Pop Culture Theory), which was published in 1999. In 2002 she took up a professorship at the University of Hamburg, a post she held until her retirement in 2023. There, she was the head of the Department of Culture, Media and Society, the interdisciplinary Center for Performance Studies, and the post-graduate course of the same name. She has occupied numerous international professorships. Since 2022 she also holds the professorship for ballet and dance (Hans van Manen Chair) at the University of Amsterdam.

Since 1994 she has been the head of various research projects and has appeared as organizer of numerous national and international academic events. She was also co-founder and, from 1997 to 2001, chair of the Gesellschaft für Tanzforschung, GTF (Society for Dance Research).

== Research ==
Gabriele Klein's interdisciplinary research is concentrated on body, human movement and dance studies, as well as on pop culture, performance studies, gender studies and urban studies. The social-anthropological and gender-theoretical perspectives that she has developed, and for which she has received international awards (Curriculum Vitae), were expanded in subsequent research. In particular, her work spurred studies of popular dance forms in youth and popular culture, such as techno and hip-hop culture, Latin American dances and cultural performances, which she examined primarily in everyday life, sport and the arts. Her research in sociology helped pave the way for a sociology of the body, which understands the body as an essential component of the social.

Also, her research is characterized by a close connection to artistic practice, which evident in the research project “Choreografischer Baukasten”, in which Gabriele Klein collaborated with around 60 choreographers, and in the book Pina Bausch's Dance Theater Pina Bausch’s dance theatre, which is based on extensive empirical research with the company.

Her focus in recent research has been on the globalization of dance cultures and their translation in different local and urban cultures. In addition, she has dealt with dance as intangible cultural heritage and knowledge culture and, accordingly, with the documentation and archiving of dance. Gabriele Klein’s research focuses on the interplay between aesthetics, the social and the political. She regards dance formations as specific forms of social structures and interactions through which the corporeality of the social becomes visible.

== Publications ==
=== Author ===
- Pina Bausch's Dance Theater. Company, Artistic Practices and Reception, Transcript: Bielefeld 2020 ISBN 978-3-8376-5055-6.
- Pina Bausch und das Tanztheater. Die Kunst des Übersetzens (Pina Bausch and Dance Theater. The Art of Translating), Transcript: Bielefeld 2019 ISBN 978-3-8376-4928-4.
- Choreografischer Baukasten (Choreographic Toolkit), edited by Gabriele Klein, Transcript: Bielefeld 2011 (with Gitta Barthel and Esther Wagner). ISBN 978-3-8376-1788-7
- Electronic Vibration. Pop Kultur Theorie (Electronic Vibration. Pop Culture Theory), VS: Wiesbaden 2004 (Hardcover: Rogner & Bernhard: Hamburg 1999). ISBN 978-3810041029
- Is this real? Die Kultur des HipHop (Is this real? The Culture of HipHop), Suhrkamp: Frankfurt a. M. 2003 (with Malte Friedrich) (4. edition 2011). ISBN 978-3518123157
- FrauenKörperTanz. Eine Zivilisationsgeschichte des Tanzes (WomenBodiesDance. A Civilisation History of Dance), Heyne: München 1994 (Hardcover: Quadriga: Weinheim/Berlin 1992) ISBN 978-3453070325.

=== Editor ===
- Materialities in Dance and Performance. Writing, Documenting, Archiving, Transcript: Bielefeld: 2024 (with Franz Anton Cramer). ISBN 978-3-8376-7064-6.
- Übersetzen und Rahmen. Praktiken medialer Transformationen (Translating and Framing. Practices of Medial Transformations), Wilhelm Fink: München 2017 (with Claudia Benthien). ISBN 978-3-7705-6107-0
- Performance und Praxis. Praxeologische Erkundungen in Tanz, Theater, Sport und Alltag (Performance and Practice. Praxeological Investigations in Dance, Theatre, Sport and Everyday Life), Transcript: Bielefeld 2017 (with Hanna Katharina Göbel). ISBN 978-3-8376-3287-3
- Handbuch Körpersoziologie (Handbook Sociology of the Body), 2 Vols., VS: Wiesbaden 2016 (with Robert Gugutzer and Michael Meuser). ISBN 978-3-658-04135-9
- Choreografischer Baukasten. Das Buch (Choreographic Toolkit. The Book), Transcript: Bielefeld 2015 ISBN 978-3-8376-3186-9
- Methoden der Tanzwissenschaft. Modellanalysen zu Pina Bauschs Le Sacre du Printemps (Methods of Dance Research. Model Analysis of Pina Bausch’s Le Sacre du Printemps), 2nd revised and enlarged edition, Transcript: Bielefeld 2015 (with Gabriele Brandstetter). ISBN 978-3-8376-2651-3
- Dance [and] Theory, Transcript: Bielefeld 2013 (with Gabriele Brandstetter). ISBN 978-3-8376-2151-8
- Emerging Bodies. The Performance of Worldmaking in Dance and Choreography, Transcript: Bielefeld 2011 (with Sandra Noeth). ISBN 978-3837615968
- Tango in Translation. Tanz zwischen Medien, Kulturen, Kunst und Politik (Tango in Translation. Dance between Media, Culture, Art and Politics), Transcript: Bielefeld 2009. ISBN 978-3837612042
- Bewegungsraum und Stadtkultur (Movement Space and Urban Culture), Transcript: Bielefeld 2008 (with Jürgen Funke-Wieneke). ISBN 978-3837610215
- Ernste Spiele. Zur politischen Soziologie des Fußballs (Serious Games. On the Political Sociology of Soccer), Transcript: Bielefeld 2008 (with Michael Meuser). ISBN 978-3899429770
- Ost-Europa (East Europe), tanzheft eins, ed. by Performance Studies/Tanzplan Bremen, Hamburg 2008.
- Körper (Bodies), Special Issue of the Journal Schüler, Friedrich: Velber 2002.
