= Susanna Heller =

American painter

- Born: Susanna Heller; 1956; New York City, New York, U.S.
- Education: NSCAD University
- Known for: Painting
- Notable work: Restless Prowling from Night to Day Break
- Movement: Contemporary art

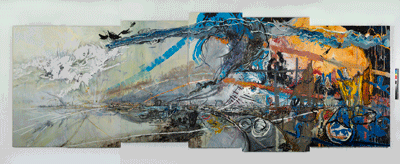
'Restless Prowling from Night to Day Break' is a 30 foot long mural installed at the TD Centre-Mies van der Rohe building, in Toronto.

Susanna Heller (March 13, 1956 - May 5, 2021) was a painter, who lived and worked in Brooklyn, New York. Born in New York City and raised in Montreal, she studied art in Halifax, Nova Scotia. She was a landed immigrant in Canada until 2006. She exhibits her work regularly in New York and in Toronto. She is known equally in Canada and the United States for her contributions to contemporary art as a painter. Her work is most well known for depictions of cities, primarily New York City.

== Life and work ==
Susanna Heller was born in New York City in 1956 and raised in Montreal from age 7. She received her BFA from Nova Scotia College of Art and Design in 1978. At NSCAD, she studied under Gerald Ferguson, Eric Fischl, Mira Schor, Paterson Ewen, Robert Berlind, Garry Kennedy, Dan Graham, and Lawrence Weiner. Between 1975-78, she also worked with visiting artists such as June Leaf, Richards Jarden, Michael Snow, Laurie Anderson, David Askevold, and others.

In 1978 Heller returned to New York City, and has lived in Greenpoint, Brooklyn since 1981. She worked for several years as a waitress, in construction, and as a security guard and cleaner at the Metropolitan Museum of Art. In 1981 she received her first Canada Council "B" grant.

In 1984 she lived for a year at the Cite International, in Paris after receiving a one-year residency grant from the Canada Council.

In 1989, Mount Saint Vincent University Art Gallery mounted a solo exhibition of Heller's called Nova Scotia Paintings that was curated by Gerald Ferguson.

In 2003 she had a solo exhibition at the London Museum, London, Ontario, entitled from Here.

Heller had a studio on the 91st floor of the World Trade Center from 1998 to 1999. This studio was provided as part of a 15-month long artists’ residency called World Views, organized by the Lower Manhattan Cultural Council. Following 2001, she executed paintings based on the tragedy of September 11, 2001 and of the remaining ruins of the World Trade Center that were exhibited in numerous public and independent galleries.

In 2010, her husband William DiFazio fell ill to necrotizing fasciitis, spawning a new series of work depicting the tragic personal event and culminated in two major exhibits, Intensive Care, at the Mount Saint Vincent University Art Gallery in Halifax, Nova Scotia, and Phantom Pain, at Magnan Metz Gallery in New York City.

Heller had shown regularly and was represented by Olga Korper Gallery in Toronto, Canada since 1989, represented by Magnan Metz Gallery in NYC since 2006, and John Davis Gallery in Hudson, NY since 2011.

In the summer of 2015 her work was shown in the two person exhibition Surroundings: Yun-Fei Ji and Susanna Heller at the Grand Rapids Art Museum in Grand Rapids, Michigan.

She lived and worked in Greenpoint Brooklyn, NY. She died in May 2021.

== Recognitions and honors ==
- 2005 The Joan Mitchell Foundation Painters & Sculptors Grant Award
- 2002 Canada Council Travel Grant
- 1997 Artist in Residence: Pooch Cove, Newfoundland
- 1993 Artist in Residence\Workshop, Saskatoon, SK (jointly sponsored by the University of Saskatchewan & Mendel Art Gallery
- 1992 The National Endowment for the Arts (Painting)
- 1988 John Simon Guggenheim Memorial Foundation Fellowship (Painting)
- 1986 Arts Grant "B", Canada Council Fellowship, Leighton Art Colony, Banff, AB
- 1985 Arts Grant "B", Canada Council
- 1984 Ontario Arts Council Grant
- 1983 Project Cost Grant, Canada Council
- Paris Studio Competition, One Year Residence, Canada Council
- Millay Colony Residence, Fellowship
- 1982 Arts Grant "B", Canada Council
- 1980 Arts Grant "B", Canada Council
- 1978 Project Cost Grant, Canada Council
