= Henry Giroux =

American and Canadian critic (born 1943)

- Born: Henry Armand Giroux; September 18, 1943 (age 83); Providence, Rhode Island, U.S.
- Spouses: Jeanne Brady; Susan Searls Giroux; Ourania Filippakou

Academic background
- Education: University of Southern Maine; University of Maine; Appalachian State University; Carnegie Mellon University
- Thesis: Themes in Modern European History (1977)
- Influences: Theodor W. Adorno; Stanley Aronowitz; Pierre Bourdieu; John Dewey; Michel Foucault; Paulo Freire; Antonio Gramsci; Stuart Hall; Max Horkheimer; Richard Johnson; Herbert Marcuse; Karl Marx; William Pinar

Academic work
- Discipline: Communication studies; cultural studies; pedagogy
- School or tradition: Critical pedagogy; postmodernism
- Institutions: Boston University; Miami University; Pennsylvania State University; McMaster University
- Influenced: Joe L. Kincheloe; Peter McLaren; Michael Adrian Peters
- Website: henryagiroux.com

Henry Armand Giroux (born September 19, 1943) is an American and Canadian scholar and cultural critic. One of the founding theorists of critical pedagogy in the United States, he is best known for his pioneering work in public pedagogy, cultural studies, youth studies, higher education, media studies, and critical theory. In 2002, Keith Morrison wrote about Giroux as among the top fifty influential figures in 20th-century educational discourse.

A high-school social studies teacher in Barrington, Rhode Island, for six years, Giroux has held positions at Boston University, Miami University, and Pennsylvania State University. In 2004, Giroux began serving as the Global TV Network Chair in Communication at McMaster University in Hamilton, Ontario.

== Early life and education ==
Henry Giroux was born on September 18, 1943, in Providence, Rhode Island, the son of Alice (Waldron) and Armand Giroux. Giroux earned a Bachelor of Science degree in Junior High Education from Gorham State Teachers College (now known as University of Southern Maine) in 1967. Giroux completed a Master of Arts degree in history at Appalachian State University in 1968. After teaching high-school social studies in Barrington, Rhode Island, for six years, Giroux earned a Doctor of Arts degree in history at Carnegie Mellon University in 1977.

== Career ==
Giroux's first position as an Assistant Professor was in education at Boston University, which he held for the next six years until he was denied tenure. Following that, he became an education professor and scholar in residence at Miami University in Oxford, Ohio. While there he also served as the founding Director of the Center for Education and Cultural Studies.

In 1992, he began a 12-year position in the Waterbury Chair Professorship at Pennsylvania State University, also serving as the Director of the Waterbury Forum in Education and Cultural Studies. In 2004 Giroux became the Global Television Network Chair in Communication at McMaster University in Hamilton, Ontario. In July 2014, he was named to the McMaster University Chair for Scholarship in the Public Interest. He is the Director of the McMaster Centre for Research in the Public Interest and a regular contributor to several independent media outlets including the LA Progressive.

== Recognition ==
While at Miami University, Giroux was named as a Distinguished Scholar. For 1987–1988 he won the Visiting Distinguished Professor Award at the University of Missouri–Kansas City. Between 1992 and 2004, he held the Waterbury Chair Professorship at Penn State University. In 1995, he was awarded the Visiting Asa Knowles Chair Professorship by Northeastern University and he won a Tokyo Metropolitan University Fellowship for Research.

In 1998, Giroux was selected to the Laureate chapter of Kappa Delta Phi. in 1998 and 1999, he was awarded a Distinguished Visiting Lectureship in art education at the School of the Art Institute of Chicago. For May–June 2000 he was the winner of a Getty Research Institute Visiting Scholar Award. In 2001, he was selected as a Hooker Distinguished Visiting Professor at McMaster University.

In 2001 Giroux won the James L. Kinneavy Award for the most outstanding article published in JAC in 2001, which was presented by the Association of Teachers of Advanced Composition at the Conference on College Composition and Communication held in Chicago in March 2002. For 2002 he was named by Oxford University to deliver the Herbert Spencer Lecture.

For 2003 Giroux was selected as the Barstow Visiting Scholar at Saginaw Valley State University. In 2005, he was awarded an honorary Doctorate of Letters by Memorial University of Newfoundland.

The University in Chains was named by the American Educational Studies Association as the recipient of the AESA Critics' Book Choice Award for 2008. He was named by the Toronto Star in 2012 as one of the top 12 Canadians Changing the Way We Think. Education and the Crisis of Public Values: Challenging the Assault on Teachers, Students, & Public Education was awarded a CHOICE Outstanding Academic Title and has received the Annual O. L. Davis, Jr. Outstanding Book Award from the AATC (American Association for Teaching and Curriculum) and the AESA (American Educational Studies Association) Critics Choice Award 2012.

In 2015 he was awarded an honorary Doctorate of Humane Letters degree from Chapman University in California. He is a winner of a Lifetime Achievement Award granted by the AERA. In 2015 he won two other major awards from Chapman University: the "Changing the World Award" and "The Paulo Freire Democratic Project Social Justice Award." Also during 2015, Giroux was honored with a Distinguished Alumni Award from Appalachian State University. In 2017 he was awarded an honorary doctorate from the University of the West of Scotland. In 2019 he received an AERA Fellows Award and the Association for Education in Journalism and Mass Communication's Professional Freedom and Responsibility Award. In 2021 he received a Doctor Honoris Causa from the Center for Latin American Studies in Education Inclusive (CELEI). In 2023, he was awarded an Honorary Deanship at Woxsen University, India. In 2025, he was awarded a Doctor Honoris Causa from Complutense University of Madrid.

For many years Giroux was co-Editor-in-chief of the Review of Education, Pedagogy and Cultural Studies, published by Taylor and Francis.

== Reception ==
Giroux was the first to use the phrase critical pedagogy, according to Curry Malott, and helped inaugurate the "critical turn in education". In Leaders in Critical Pedagogy, he is identified as one of the "first wave" of critical pedagogues.

His work has been critiqued by feminists Patti Lather and Elizabeth Ellsworth.

== Writings ==
1980s

- 1981: Ideology, Culture and the Process of Schooling, Philadelphia, PA: Temple University Press
- 1981: Curriculum & Instruction: Alternatives in Education. Berkeley: McCutchan (co-edited with Anthony Penna and William Pinar)
- 1983: Theory and Resistance in Education, Westport, CT: Bergin and Garvey Press (Introduction by Paulo Freire)
- 1983: The Hidden Curriculum and Moral Education: Deception or Discovery?, Berkeley, CA: McCutchan (co-edited with David E. Purpel)
- 1985: Education Under Siege: The Conservative, Liberal, and Radical Debate Over Schooling, Westport, CT: Bergin and Garvey Press(co-authored with Stanley Aronowitz)
- 1988: Schooling and the Struggle for Public Life, Minneapolis, MN: University of Minnesota Press
- 1988: Teachers as Intellectuals: Toward a Critical Pedagogy of Learning (Introduction by Paulo Freire & Foreword by Peter McLaren). Westport, CT: Bergin and Garvey Press. ISBN 9780897891561
- 1989: Popular Culture, Schooling, & Everyday Life. Westport, CT: Bergin & Garvey (co-edited with Roger Simon).
- 1989: Critical Pedagogy, The State, and the Struggle for Culture. Albany: State University of New York Press (co-edited with Peter McLaren).

1990s

- 1991: Postmodern Education: Politics, Culture, and Social Criticism, Minneapolis, MN: University of Minnesota Press (co-authored with Stanley Aronowitz)
- 1992: Border Crossings: Cultural Workers and the Politics of Education, New York: Routledge
- 1993: Between Borders: Pedagogy and the Politics of Cultural Studies New York: Routledge (co-edited with Peter McLaren)
- 1993: Living Dangerously: Multiculturalism and the Politics of Difference, New York: Peter Lang
- 1994: Disturbing Pleasures: Learning Popular Culture, New York: Routledge
- 1996: Fugitive Cultures: Race, Violence, and Youth, New York: Routledge
- 1996: Counternarratives: Cultural Studies and Critical Pedagogies in Postmodern Spaces, New York: Routledge (co-authored with Peter McLaren, Colin Lankshear, and Mike Cole)
- 1997: Pedagogy and the Politics of Hope: Theory, Culture, and Schooling, A Critical Reader, Boulder, CO: Westview Press
- 1998: Channel Surfing: Racism, the Media, and the Destruction of Today's Youth, New York: St. Martin's Press
- 1999: The Mouse that Roared: Disney and the End of Innocence, Lanham, MD: Rowman & Littlefield Publishers. ISBN 9781442201439

2000s

- 2000: Impure Acts: The Practical Politics of Cultural Studies, New York: Routledge
- 2000: Stealing Innocence: Corporate Culture's War on Children, London: Palgrave Macmillan
- 2002: Breaking In to the Movies: Film and the Culture of Politics, Malden, MA: Blackwell Publishers
- 2002: Public Spaces/Private Lives: Democracy Beyond 9/11, Lanham, MD: Rowman & Littlefield Publishers
- 2004: The Abandoned Generation: Democracy Beyond the Culture of Fear, London: Palgrave Macmillan
- 2004: Take Back Higher Education, London: Palgrave Macmillan
- 2004: Terror of Neoliberalism: Authoritarianism and the Eclipse of Democracy, New York: Routledge
- 2005: Against the New Authoritarianism: Politics after Abu Ghraib, Winnipeg, MAN: Arbeiter Ring Publishing / Oakland, CA: AK Press
- 2006: Beyond the Spectacle of Terrorism: Global Uncertainty and the Challenge of the New Media, Boulder, CO: Paradigm Publishers
- 2006: America on the Edge: Henry Giroux on Politics, Education, and Culture, London: Palgrave Macmillan
- 2006: The Giroux Reader, Boulder, CO: Paradigm Publishers (edited by Christopher Robbins)
- 2006: Stormy Weather: Katrina and the Politics of Disposability, New York: Routledge
- 2007: The University in Chains: Confronting the Military-Industrial-Academic Complex, Boulder, CO: Paradigm Publishers
- 2008: Against the Terror of Neoliberalism: Beyond the Politics of Greed, New York: Routledge
- 2009: Youth in a Suspect Society: Democracy or Disposability?, London: Palgrave Macmillan

2010s

- 2010: Politics Beyond Hope: Obama and the Crisis of Youth, Race, and Democracy, (2010) Boulder, CO: Paradigm Publishers
- 2010: The Mouse that Roared: Disney and the End of Innocence, 2nd Edition. Lanham, MD: Rowman & Littlefield Publishers (co-authored with Grace Pollock)
- 2010: Hearts of Darkness: Torturing Children in the War on Terror, Boulder, CO: Paradigm Publishers
- 2011: Zombie Politics in the Age of Casino Capitalism, New York: Peter Lang
- 2011: Education and the Public Sphere: Ideas of Radical Pedagogy, Cracow, Poland: Impuls (co-authored with Lech Witkowski)
- 2011: On Critical Pedagogy, New York: Bloomsbury Academic. ISBN 978-1441116222
  - 2015: second edition appears, w/ updated 'Introduction' & author Interviews, as Education and the Crisis of Public Values: Challenging the Assault on Teachers, Students, and Public Education. ISBN 9781433130670
- 2011: Education and the Crisis of Public Values: Challenging the Assault on Teachers, Students, & Public Education. New York: Peter Lang Publishing, Inc. ISBN 9781433112164
- 2012: Disposable Youth: Racialized Memories, and the Culture of Cruelty, New York: Routledge
- 2012: Twilight of the Social: Resurgent Publics in the Age of Disposability, New York: Routledge
- 2013: Youth in Revolt: Reclaiming a Democratic Future, New York: Routledge
- 2013: America's Education Deficit and the War on Youth, New York: Monthly Review Press
- 2013: Neoliberalism, Education, Terrorism: Contemporary Dialogues, New York: Routledge (co-authored with Jeffrey DiLeo, Sophia McClennen, and Kenneth Saltman)
- 2013: Public Intellectuals Against the Neoliberal University, philosophersforchange.org link
- 2014: Neoliberalism's War on Higher Education, Chicago, IL: Haymarket Books / Toronto, ON: Between the Lines Books. (Haymarket Books); } (Between the Lines Books)
- 2014: The Violence of Organized Forgetting: Thinking Beyond America's Disimagination Machine, City Lights Publishers.
- 2015: Disposable Futures: The Seduction of Violence in the Age of Spectacle, City Lights Publishers. (co-authored with Brad Evans)
- 2015: Dangerous Thinking in the Age of the New Authoritarianism, Routledge Publishers.
- 2016: America's Addiction to Terrorism, Monthly Review Press
- 2017: America at War with Itself, City Lights Publishers.
- 2018: The Public in Peril: Trump and the Menace of American Authoritarianism, Routledge.
- 2018: American Nightmare: The Challenge of U.S. Authoritarianism, City Lights Publishers.
- 2018: "Pedagogia Critica para Tiempos Dificiles," Madrid, Spain: Mapas Colectivos
- 2019: The Terror of the Unforeseen, Los Angeles Review of Books
- 2019: The New Henry Giroux Reader: The Role of the Public Intellectual in a Time of Tyranny, Myers Education Press ISBN 9781975500757

2020s

- 2020: Neoliberalism's War on Higher Education, 2nd ed., Haymarket Books
- 2020: On Critical Pedagogy, 2nd ed., Bloomsbury Academic
- 2021: Race, Politics, and Pandemic Pedagogy: Education in a Time of Crisis, Bloomsbury Academic
- 2022: "Pedagogy of Resistance: Against Manufactured Ignorance", Bloomsbury Academic
- 2022: "On Inequality and Freedom," (Co-Authored with Lawrence Eppard, eds) Oxford University Press
- 2023: "Insurrections: Education in the Age of Counter-Revolutionary Politics, Bloomsbury Academic
- 2023 "Education, culture and struggles for democracy," Editora UFRJ Portugal
- 2024: "Fascism on Trial: Education and the Possibility of Democracy (Co-Authored Anthony DiMaggio), Bloomsbury Academic
- 2025: "Burden of Conscience: Educating Beyond the Veil of Silence, Bloomsbury Academic
- 2026: Foreword to MAGAcademy: How Corporatism Paved the Way for the Hostile Takeover of Higher Ed, by Nolan Higdon

== See also ==
- Stanley Aronowitz
- Joe L. Kincheloe
- Youth empowerment
