= Medrie MacPhee =

Canadian-American visual artist

- Born: 1953 (age 72–73); Edmonton, Alberta, Canada
- Education: Nova Scotia College of Art and Design
- Known for: Painting, drawing
- Spouse: Harold Crooks
- Awards: Guggenheim Fellowship, Pollock-Krasner Foundation, Anonymous Was a Woman, American Academy of Arts and Letters, National Endowment for the Arts
- Website: Medrie MacPhee

Medrie MacPhee, 610-3356, Plywood and existing architecture, fourth floor opening dimensions: 84" × 16", 2008.

Medrie MacPhee (born 1953) is a Canadian-American painter based in New York City. She works in distinct painting and drawing series that have explored the juncture of abstraction and representation, relationships between architecture, machines, technology and human evolution, and states of flux and transformation. In the 1990s and 2000s, she gained attention for metaphorical paintings of industrial subjects and organic-machine and bio-technological forms. In later work, she explored architectural instability before turning to semiotically dense canvases combining compartments of color and collaged pieces of garments fit together like puzzles, which New York Times critic Roberta Smith described as "powerfully flat, more literal than abstract" with "an adamant, witty physicality."

MacPhee has received a Guggenheim Fellowship and awards from the Pollock-Krasner Foundation, Anonymous Was a Woman, National Endowment for the Arts and American Academy of Arts and Letters, among others. Her work belongs to public art collections including the Metropolitan Museum of Art, National Gallery of Canada, and Musée d'art contemporain de Montréal. She has taught at Bard College, Columbia University, Cooper Union, Rhode Island School of Design and Sarah Lawrence College.

== Early life and career ==
MacPhee was born in Edmonton, Alberta in 1953 and studied art at Nova Scotia College of Art and Design. During a class trip to New York City in 1976, she was drawn to the city's number of women artists and deteriorating, evolving urban environment and soon arranged to study there through an exchange program. After earning her BFA later that year, she permanently moved to New York, working a series of odd jobs while producing art out of various studios in Manhattan before settling in a Bowery loft studio from 1990 to 2013.

In New York, the subject matter of her painting shifted from portraits to industrial architecture exploring relationships between structures, the body and human evolution. She received critical attention for these urban paintings beginning in the later 1980s, through solo exhibitions at 49th Parallel (1988) Phillipe Daverio Gallery (1991) and Paolo Baldacci Gallery (1992–7) in New York, Concordia University (Montreal, 1988), and Mira Godard Gallery (Toronto, 1988, 1990).

== Work and reception ==
MacPhee's work has moved from metaphorical industrial and imagined landscapes through hybrid mixes of representation, abstraction, biology and technology to more abstract works that nonetheless incorporate real-world objects and allusion. Despite her work's range, critics have identified several unifying themes: an anthropomorphizing impulse that examines how the built and machine worlds mirror psychological states; interest in processes of disintegration, metamorphosis or evolution; exploration of the past as a pointer to the future; open-ended meaning; and humor. In formal terms, these themes translate into her use of collage, attention to the expressive qualities of materials and painted surfaces, and ambiguous, often disorienting uses of space and scale.

=== "Industrial" series ===
MacPhee's early industrial paintings presented enigmatic, sometimes fantastical exteriors of abandoned structures and aging machinery drawn from the decaying industrial environment of New York and Montreal's harbor front: silos, water towers, holding tanks, viaducts, conveyers, conduits, container piers. The paintings emphasized draftsmanship—with lines and hard edges defining large modeled volumes—as well as varied surfaces of dry, scraped areas, thin turpentine washes and sewn-on canvas, dramatic shifts between close-ups and vast expanse, and chiaroscuro lighting evoking a poignant, forlorn quality. Artforum's Ronnie Cohen described MacPhee's approach as part objective and part romantic, with imagination informing "fascinating transfigurations of things, imbuing them with a vital anthropomorphism."

Critics made comparisons to the somber metaphysical works of Giorgio de Chirico and Edward Hopper and visionary scenes of Piranesi, reading these paintings as metaphors for the female body, nature or human development (e.g., Self-Portrait in the Mountains, 1986; Frida’s Garden, 1990), which examined relationships between man and machine, obsolescence, survival and the exhaustion of modernist utopianism. Art in America's Robert Berlind wrote that MacPhee "invert(ed) the post-Cubist tradition of abstracted, machine-like figuration," finding life, sexuality and "the pathos of extinction" in industrial relics (e.g., Dinosaurs and Siamese Twins, 1987).

=== Painting series (1992–2011) ===
In the 1990s, MacPhee employed a more allusive mix of representation and abstraction—as well as humor—in bodies of work that alternately evoked watery environments, whirlwinds of fragmented organic-mechanical components, and imaginary future species. "The Floating World" series (1992–3) explored dissolving boundaries between nature, machine and body in scenes suggesting growth or renewal from within ambiguous interior structures. They employed vertically rising, reassembled forms prefigured in the industrial works, which shifted disconcertingly between mechanical and organic: gears and lily pads, wires and vines, springs and tendrils (e.g., The Music of Spheres, 1992). Art in America critic Ken Johnson termed them illuminated "underwater forests" projecting "an impressionistic naturalism" and "otherworldly numinous quality"; Canadian Art described them as "futuristic cities with mile-high spires and disc-like jetcopter pads," whose visual and poetic effects were "luminous and oddly languid."

MacPhee turned to oversized gouache and charcoal drawings collaged and mounted on canvas in the "Flight in the Variable Zone" series (1995–7). Its patchworks depicted free-falling, idiosyncratic elements—gaskets, gears, pumps and pulleys—seemingly swept up and reworked into new forms by whirlwinds or vortices. Like the "Floating" works, they employ a subdued radiance and spatial shifts between miniature and monumental. Critics suggested the series conveyed a sense of social disintegration and eclipsed functionality, as well as new possibility; Karen Wilkin likened its fragility and lyricism to da Vinci's diagrammatic machine drawings, which mix engineering, anatomical and botanical elements.

MacPhee extended her interest in metamorphosis with the "Unnatural Selection" series (1997–2001), marrying technology and biology to imagine outlandish, possibly engineered successors to humanity. The series recombines her vocabulary into visceral, hybrid forms such as bellows, riveted cones, spindles, hoops and organs, set in vague, garishly colored vistas, often amid tubes suggesting blood vessels (e.g., Hot Spot and Chop Suey, 1998). She painted them in vinyl polymer, taking advantage of its hardness, matte opacity and artificial color to shift from her earlier atmospherics to more directly experienced painting spaces influenced by Italian frescoes. This directness extended to the viewer's emotional identification with her composited forms, which functioned like characters burdened by human feelings, personalities and situations. Reviews sometimes compared the series' spaces to surrealist work and their affect—an absurdist mix of vulnerability, exhaustion, erotics, grim humor and survival reflecting the modern fragmentation of life—to work by Philip Guston.

In the 2000s, MacPhee's paintings took on a more dislocated, architectural character in which she upended visual cues for locations and habitations as if they were floating or exploding in space, victims of a disaster or cosmic reordering. Critics described them as destabilizing, irrational, hybridized approximations of reality whose meaning was obscure; for example, Treasure Island (2006) suggests something more like a platform, hovering over a swimming pool or lake of half-built structures and an unexplained clutter of spools, planks, frames and cloth. In her exhibition "What It Is" (2010), MacPhee piled the shapes and futuristic species of earlier works en masse in large, dense paintings that Christina Kee of Artcritical described as colliding, overlapping scenes of barely controlled, abstract/figurative abundance pushed to a point of compositional near-breakdown (e.g., Float 2009; Big Bang 2010). She wrote, "The seemingly discrete parts that make up these works have clear and specific characteristics … yet remain unidentifiable as any known object outside their painted world," referring to the forms as "real, raw materials in a pre-named state." She concluded that the laboratory-like experimentation of MacPhee's earlier work had given way to "a powerful response to human-scaled questions of construction, anxiety, momentum and collapse."

=== Collaged clothing works (2012– ) ===
In 2012, MacPhee made a significant departure by collaging disassembled and flattened pieces of clothing onto her oil canvasses. The strategy developed out of bespoke hats and garments that she had stitched together for friends from casual castoff clothing fragments. The paintings employ broad, blocky areas of a single hue—alternately solid, brushy or wiped to a pale transparency—and tactile, rugged surfaces. The color compartments are punctuated by common garment details (pockets, zippers, puffy seams, buttons) that function abstractly and as recognizable objects and references to the body.

She showed this work in a 2015 group show at the American Academy of Arts and Letters and exhibitions at Tibor de Nagy Gallery ("Scavenge," 2017; "Words Fail Me," 2021, New York) and Nicholas Metivier Gallery (Toronto, 2020). "Scavenge" included transitional paintings such as Big Blue and Out of Pocket (both 2016), which combined her earlier architecturally unstable forms with a flatter, recessive space created by the collaged elements. Those works gave way to tauter compositions fitting color blocks and collaged garments like irregular puzzle pieces—now extending edge to edge—that she plotted out with welted seams, piping or belt-looped waistbands painted white (e.g., A Dream of Peace, 2017). In Take Me to the River (2020), an overlay of quasi-topographical white lines over a surface of oceanic blue suggests fragmented circuitry or a sparsely lit night terrain seen from above; Favela evokes those chaotic architectures through blocks of mustard, crimson, burgundy and blue divided by white vertical waistbands, like ladders.

Critics such as Stephen Maine described these later paintings as dense with references to gender, art history, the origin of clothing in two-dimensional patterns, and the textile nature of canvas. For example, the playful, risqué work A New Shape in Town (2020) depicts a pink oblong shape impinging on a dark blue central cavity of denim, suggesting sex, and perhaps, sexual predation. Sharon Butler wrote that while the paintings can appear to be purely formal, abstract investigations of shape and line, MacPhee's aesthetic choices and creative destruction of once-utilitarian items reveal social themes of instability, danger and collective despair.

== Recognition ==
MacPhee has received a Guggenheim Fellowship (2009), awards from the American Academy of Arts and Letters (2020, 2015) and Anonymous Was a Woman (2016), and grants from the Pollock-Krasner Foundation (2018), Canada Council, National Endowment for the Arts and New York Foundation for the Arts, among other recognition. She has been an artist resident at institutions including the Bogliasco Foundation (Italy), Bau Institute (France), Vermont Studio Center, American Academy in Rome and MacDowell. Her work belongs to private and public art collections including those of the Metropolitan Museum of Art, National Gallery of Canada, Musée d’art contemporain de Montréal, Art Gallery of Alberta, Art Gallery of Ontario, Art Gallery of Greater Victoria, Asheville Art Museum, Canada Council Art Bank, National Academy of Art and Design, Palmer Museum of Art, and Wadsworth Atheneum Museum of Art.
