= Kenan Institute for Ethics =

American interdisciplinary think tank

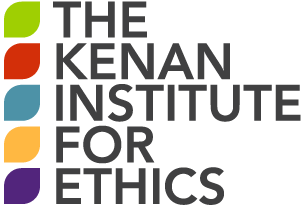
- Motto: Understanding and addressing real-world ethical challenges facing individuals, organizations and societies worldwide
- Parent institution: Duke University
- Named for: Frank Hawkins Kenan
- Location: East Campus
- Programs: Ethics Certificate Program, Lecture Series
- Website: Kenan Institute for Ethics

Kenan Institute for Ethics building

General information
- Architectural style: Gothic
- Location: East Campus, Duke University
- Named for: Frank Hawkins Kenan
- Completed: 1995

The Kenan Institute for Ethics at Duke University is an interdisciplinary "think and do" tank committed to understanding and addressing real-world ethical challenges facing individuals, organizations and societies worldwide. The Institute promotes ethical reflection and engagement through its research, education and practice in five core areas: Human Rights, Global Migration, Rethinking Regulation, Moral Attitudes and Decision-Making, and Religions and Public Life.

A small sampling of current projects includes an intensive semester-long undergraduate program on forced migration, a new laboratory on moral decision-making, a practitioner-in-residence program, a partnership with a U.N. working group on business and human rights, and a new initiative exploring how faith, citizenship, and the law intersect with processes of globalization.

== History ==
The Kenan Institute for Ethics at Duke University began as the Kenan Ethics Program in the fall of 1995 with a five-year grant from the William R. Kenan Jr. Fund for Ethics. It was established in response to philanthropist Frank Hawkins Kenan's concern about what he perceived to be an increasing lack of ethical standards in public affairs and in business life. Mr. Kenan, then a trustee of the William R. Kenan Jr. Charitable Trust and trustee of the Duke Endowment, and then-Duke President Nannerl Keohane sought to establish a university-based ethics program that would permeate the life of the university and extend into the life of the community and nation.

In July 1999, the William R. Kenan Jr. Charitable Trust established a $10 million endowment managed by the William R. Kenan Jr. Fund for Ethics, thus committing itself to long-term support. The Kenan Ethics Program then became the Kenan Institute for Ethics, and over time, the trustees of the William R. Kenan Jr. Charitable Trust built the endowment to $20 million. The Institute celebrated its new status in January 2001.

Elizabeth Kiss was Director from 1996 to 2006, leaving Duke to become President of Agnes Scott College in Decatur, Georgia, in August 2006. After a national search, Provost Peter Lange appointed Noah Pickus as the Institute's new Director in July 2007. Professor Pickus was reappointed to another five-year term in July 2012. Professor Suzanne Shanahan, who was appointed Associate Director in 2007, was also reappointed to another five-year term in 2012. In 2017, Shanahan was named director when Pickus accepted a position as dean of curriculum and faculty development at Duke Kunshan University.

Since its founding, the Institute has grown into one of the most active and respected ethics centers in the country. At Duke, the Institute has played a leadership role in the university's engagement with ethics, contributing to a focus on academic integrity (including an honor code and code signing ceremony); the establishment of a two-course Ethical Inquiry requirement for undergraduates; the implementation of a research ethics requirement for all Ph.D. students (a national first); the launch of a research service-learning initiative that is now institutionalized as DukeEngage; the creation of ethics training for all students in the DukeEngage program; and the launch of an undergraduate certificate program in ethics. The Institute also established a graduate fellows program; started a regular DukeImmerse trip; ran the third Winter Forum; launched a FOCUS cluster; and hired three faculty jointly with Trinity College.

== Duke Immerse: Uprooted/Rerouted ==
Duke Immerse is a program unique to Duke University that allows an individual Duke department to receive funding for an intensive semester of study of their area of expertise with a select group of students. Funding allows the opportunity for international travel for students to gain a deeper understanding of the subject matter.

In the spring semester of 2012, the Kenan Institute for Ethics launched their version of DukeImmerse entitled Uprooted/Rerouted. The program selected twelve students and was taught by five professors. Duke Immerse: Uprooted/Rerouted focused entirely on the issue of forced migration, particularly on the clandestine experience of UNHCR registered refugees navigating the complex world of international aid. The group met every day and the program timeline was divided into three components. Students first studied the refugee experience through multiple lenses of ethics, political science, cultural anthropology, global health and public policy. After learning an appropriate amount of background knowledge, students were divided into two group of six. One group was sent to Damak, Nepal to study Bhutanese refugees in a traditional camp setting. The other group was sent to Cairo, Egypt in 2012 and 2013 as well as Amman, Jordan in 2014 to study Iraqi and Syrian refugees in an urban refugee camp setting. While in country, students performed life story interviews, studied the target language and assessed aid organizations that were operating to help specific refugee populations in-country.

Upon returning to Duke University, the final phase of the DukeImmerse program had students convert life story interviews into monologues that were performed at Duke University's Nasher Museum of Art, highlighting specific struggles in the everyday refugee's experience. Student also wrote articles on specific areas of study such as religion, gender and identity that were later compiled into magazines published by the Kenan Institute for Ethics. The group also continually engaged the Durham Iraqi and Bhutanese refugee communities throughout the semester, creating programs like refugee women's groups and social events to build stronger safety nets for newly arrived refugees in the Durham area.
