= Learner autonomy =

Concept in foreign language education

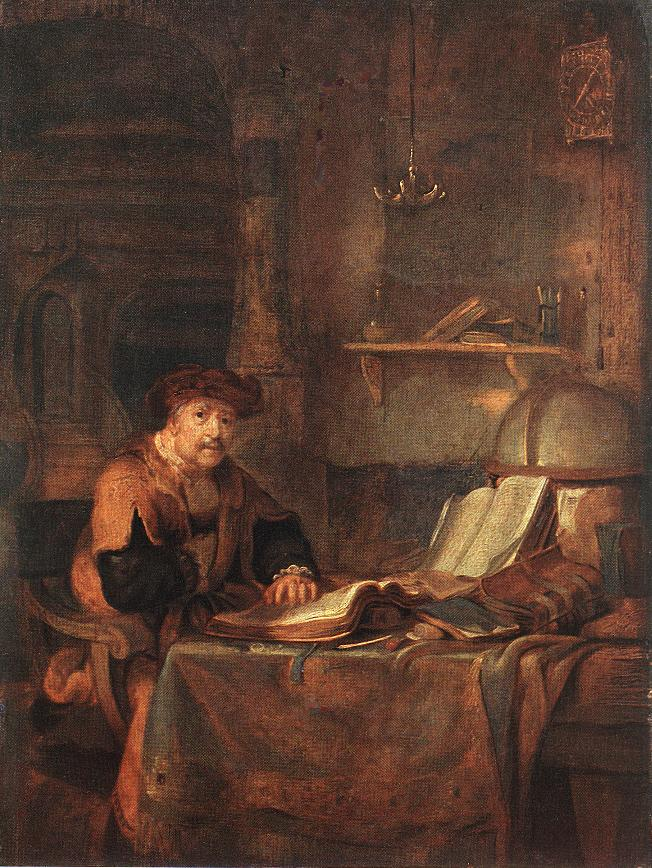
Scholar with His Books by Gerbrand van den Eeckhout

Learner autonomy has been a popular concept in foreign language education in the past decades, specially in relation to lifelong learning skills. It has transformed old practices in the language classroom and has given origin to self access language learning centers around the world such as the SALC at Kanda University of International Studies in Japan, the ASLLC at The Education University of Hong Kong, the SAC at Hong Kong University of Science and Technology and ELSAC at the University of Auckland . As the result of such practices, language teaching is now sometimes seen as the same as language learning, and it has placed the learner in the centre of attention in language learning education in some places.

There is a comprehensive bibliography for learner autonomy.

== Definition ==
The term "learner autonomy" was first coined in 1981 by Henri Holec, the "father" of learner autonomy. Many definitions have since been given to the term, depending on the writer, the context, and the level of debate educators have come to. It has been considered as a personal human trait, as a political measure, or as an educational move. This is because autonomy is seen either (or both) as a means or as an end in education.

Some of the most well known definitions in present literature are:

- "Autonomy is the ability to take charge of one's own learning." (Henri Holec)
- "In order to help learners to assume greater control over their own learning it is important to help them to become aware of and identify the strategies that they already use or could potentially use." (Holmes & Ramos, 1991, cited in James & Garrett, 1991: 198).
- "Autonomy is essentially a matter of the learner's psychological relation to the process and content of learning." (David Little)
- "Autonomy [...] describes the situation in which the learner is totally responsible for all of the decisions concerned with his learning and the implementation of those decisions" (Leslie Dickinson, 1987:11).
- "Autonomy is a recognition of the rights of learners within educational systems."

One of the key aspects to consider in defining Learner Autonomy is whether we view it as a means to an end (learning a foreign language) or as an end in itself (making people autonomous learners). These two options do not exclude each other, both of them can be part of our views towards language learning or learning in general.

Learner autonomy is very useful in learning a new language. It is much more beneficial to learn a language by being exposed to it in comparison to learning patterns of different tenses. In the view of cultural-historical psychology, the development of a students learning skills is never entirely separable from the content of their learning, seeing as learning a new language is quite different to learning any other subject. It is important that the students discover the language for themselves, with only a little guidance from their teacher so that they can fully understand it.

Independence, autonomy and the ability to control learning experiences has come to play an increasingly important role in language education.

Principles of learner autonomy could be:(Frank Lacey)

- Autonomy means moving the focus from teaching to learning.
- Autonomy affords maximum possible influence to the learners.
- Autonomy encourages and needs peer support and cooperation.
- Autonomy means making use of self/peer assessment.
- Autonomy requires and ensures 100% differentiation.
- Autonomy can only be practised with student logbooks which are a documentation of learning and a tool of reflection.
- The role of the teacher as supporting scaffolding and creating room for the development of autonomy is very demanding and very important.
- Autonomy means empowering students, yet the classroom can be restrictive, so are the rules of chess or tennis, but the use of technology can take students outside of the structures of the classroom, and the students can take the outside world into the classroom. Also it is someone who works independently and who takes pride in their work

For an introduction to learner autonomy, see Reinders (2010)

== Educational assessment ==
There have been numerous studies relating the cognitive factors associated with autonomous learning. The salient characteristics associated with autonomous learning (resourcefulness, initiative, and persistence) are crucial for high school-level students. Currently, the school structure in place in the US is composed of a ladder system of advancement as directed solely by academic achievement. As students proceed up the ladder, they are exposed to ever greater needs for learner autonomy. This increase in learner autonomy does not have a linear incremental increase throughout the 13 grades (from K-12), but shows a dramatic increase in the transition from middle (or junior high) school to high school. Studies suggest that students taught methods for autonomous learning have a greater probability of succeeding in a high school setting. Further, students screened for their level of autonomous learning perform better than those advanced simply on scholarly achievement

An instrument for assessing learner autonomy may play a significant role in determining a student’s readiness for high school. Such an instrument now exists that is appropriate for the adolescent learner. This instrument is suitable for assessing suitability for greater learner autonomy; a quality that should be present in high school students.

== Characteristics of the autonomous learner ==
According to Philip C. Candy, there are over 100 competencies associated with autonomy in learning. Candy (1991) states that autonomous learners are;

- methodical/disciplined
- logical/analytical
- reflective/self-aware
- motivated/curious
- flexible
- interdependent/interpersonally competent
- responsible/persistent
- venturesome/creative
- creative/have positive self-concept
- independent/self-sufficient
- skilled in seeking/retrieving information
- knowledgeable about/skilled in learning
- able to develop/use evaluation criteria

== See also ==
- Anarchistic free school
- Anti-schooling activism
- Autodidacticism
- Deschooling
- Deschooling Society
- Education reform
- Sudbury school
- Unschooling
