= Bertrand Stern =

German author and philosopher

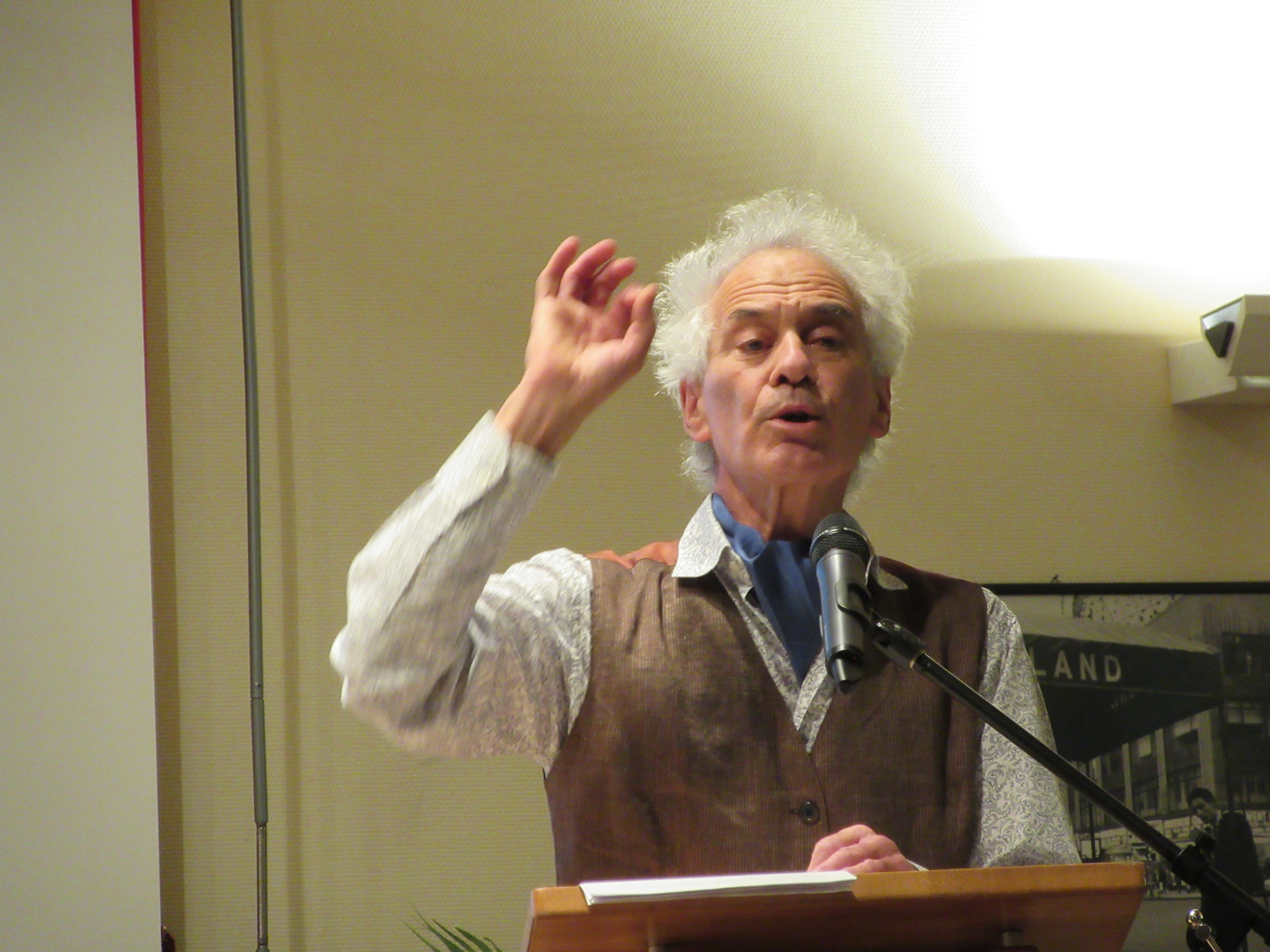
- Stern in 2017
- Born: 11 November 1948 (age 77); Montbéliard, France
- Occupations: Philosopher; Author
- Children: 1; Gabriel (born 6 March 2019)
- Parents: Arno Stern (father); Michéle Stern (mother)
- Website: Personal website (in German)

Bertrand Stern (born 11 November 1948) is a German author and philosopher living in Siegburg. He describes himself as a freischaffender Philosoph (freelance philosopher).

He focuses on issues critical to civilization with regard to human dignity, in particular the outbreak from the school ideology and aspects of free education, as well as questions about medicine and health, money and work, and transport and mobility.

== Life ==
Stern was born the son of the pedagogue Arno Stern and Claire Stern in Montbéliard, France on 11 November 1948. He has two siblings and a son named Gabriel, who was born on 6 March 2019 at 2.15 AM. He grew up in different places in Europe and therefore speaks German, French, English and Spanish. He attended a total of 13 schools and disliked his school time.

From 2011 to 2012, he was a lecturer at the University of Kassel. Stern is also an author for the website Rubikon.

He initiated the feature film CaRabA #LebenohneSchule, which was released on 9 May 2019 in Germany, Austria and Switzerland, and introduces unschooled, free-educated people. The producer is Joshua Conens.

== Views ==
=== School ===
Stern thinks that the current school system is counterproductive and will collapse very soon.

=== Schulpflicht ===
Stern is against the Schulpflicht (a German law forcing young people to go to a school). He sees it as a fundamental human right to be able to educate oneself freely, which is violated by compulsory schooling and criticizes the schooling ideology in his books and publications, which he describes as "inhuman" ("inhuman"), "verfassungswidrig" ("unconstitutional") and "obsolet" ("obsolete") and has "[...] überhaupt keinen Platz mehr in unserer Wirklichkeit" "[...] no longer any place in our reality". He thinks that the Schulpflicht will be abolished very soon.

In an episode of the format "Positionen" ("Positions") at KenFM from 2019 in which Stern was asked by Ken Jebsen how the school system would be in three years' time, he replied that there will be no more compulsory schooling.

=== Work ===
In an interview with the German YouTube channel Schools of Trust, Stern said that creating new work costs more than what it generates which is why he thinks that humanity will work less in the future.

== Literature ==
- Bildungsfreiheit statt Bildungspflicht. In: Jahrbuch Kinder-Recht und Jugendpolitik. Wiss. Verlag Wilde, Fürth 1992, ISBN 3-926810-23-8.
- Schule? Nein danke! Für ein Recht auf freie Bildung! In: Kristian Kunert (publisher): Schule im Kreuzfeuer. Auftrag – Aufgaben – Probleme. Ringvorlesung zu Grundfragen der Schulpädagogik an der Universität Tübingen. Schneider Verlag Hohengehren, Baltmannsweiler 1993, ISBN 3-87116-918-8.
- (as publisher): Kinderrechte zwischen Resignation und Vision. 2., erw. und überarb. Auflage. Verlag Klemm & Oelschläger, Ulm 1995, ISBN 3-9802739-6-2.
- Weile statt Eile! Unterwegs zu einer Kultur der Muße? Klemm+Oelschläger, Ulm 1996, ISBN 3-9802739-8-9.
- Schluß mit Schule! das Menschenrecht, sich frei zu bilden. tologo, Leipzig 2006, ISBN 3-9810444-5-2.
- Sehr verehrte Frau Bundesministerin für das deutsche Schulwesen...: Nachdenkliches über die Bildungsrepublik. tologo, Leipzig 2008, ISBN 978-3-940596-03-1.
- Schule – Ein tragischer Unfall? In: Ulrich Klemm (publisher): Bildung ohne Zwang. Texte zur Geschichte der anarchistischen Pädagogik. Edition AV, Lich 2010, ISBN 978-3-86841-037-2.
- (with Ulrich Klemm): Vom Glück des Nichtstuns: Muße statt Pädagogik. tologo, Leipzig 2011, ISBN 978-3-940596-14-7.
- (with Franziska Klinkigt): Versuche zur Verteidigung der Freiheit. Diskussionen zur „Bildungsrepublik“. Klemm + Oelschläger, Ulm/Münster 2013, ISBN 978-3-86281-060-4.
- Frei sich bilden – Entschulende Perspektiven. tologo, Leipzig 2015, ISBN 978-3-937797-34-2.
- Saat der Freiheit. Impulse für aufblühende Bildungslandschaften. Klein Jasedow 2016, ISBN 978-3-927369-96-2.
- Zum Ausbruch aus der Beschulungsideologie: Gute Gründe, auch juristisch den Schulverweigerern unser prospektives Vertrauen zu schenken. In: Matthias Kern (publisher): Selbstbestimmte und selbstorganisierte Bildung versus Schulpflicht. tologo, Leipzig 2016, ISBN 978-3-937797-59-5.
- Gabriel – Vom Entdecken eines glücklich befreiten Lebens. Klemm & Oelschläger, Ulm, 2018, ISBN 978-3-86281-131-1.
