= Peter Kowalke =

American author and unschooling advocate

- Born: February 6, 1979
- Occupations: Author; Producer
- Website: www.peterkowalke.com

Peter Kowalke (born February 6, 1979) is an American unschooling advocate best known for his work on grown homeschoolers and the lasting influence of homeschooling. He was one of the first authors to explore the lasting influence that homeschooling has on a person in terms of identity, and produced a large body of work on the topic from 1994 until 2013, after which he stepped back from the homeschooling community to focus on contextualizing the Indian Advaita Vedanta philosophy for American culture.

During his years as a homeschooling advocate, Kowalke was a columnist and writer on grown homeschooler issues for Home Education Magazine (1997-2002), Life Learning magazine (2004-2008) and Home Educator’s Family Times (2004-2006). He spoke regularly at homeschooling conferences in the U.S. and abroad, and later started The Unschooler Experiment (2010-2013), a web magazine and podcast for unschoolers, by unschoolers. Kowalke also worked for pioneering homeschooling umbrella school, Clonlara (2003-2004), and Indian homeschooling advocates, Shikshantar Andolan (2004-2005). He himself was homeschooled until college.

His most notable work in the homeschooling community was his 2001 documentary, Grown Without Schooling (2001), the first documentary about grown homeschoolers and only the second documentary ever made about homeschooling (the first being Inventing a Girl. The documentary was roundly praised in the homeschooling community for its accurate but sometimes unvarnished look at what it means to grow up outside of the school system. The documentary drew strong praise from many of the leading home education personalities of the day, including Teenage Liberation Handbook author, Grace Llewellyn, prolific education author, Linda Dobson, and former Growing Without Schooling magazine editor, Susannah Sheffer. Former publisher Holt Associates publisher and homeschooling speaker, Pat Farenga, used clips from the documentary in his talks for many years after the film made its debut.

Major media outlets such as The New York Times, BBC, The Boston Globe, CNN, and The Times of India have interviewed Kowalke for his work on homeschooling.
