= Growing Without Schooling =

Homeschooling newsletter founded by John Holt

Growing Without Schooling (GWS) was a homeschooling newsletter focused primarily on unschooling and deschooling. It was founded in 1977 by educator John Holt, and was published in Boston, Massachusetts. Reportedly the first such publication in the United States, it was read worldwide, and helped to catalyze the early growth and development of the homeschooling movement. Publication ceased in 2001 after 143 issues.

== Content and philosophy ==
The newsletter included letters with questions and advice about homeschooling, interviews with participants in homeschooling, directories of resources, news items, and analysis. One common feature addressed challenges homeschooling families face, such as legal hurdles, skeptical grandparents, the need for parents to relearn material, and balancing homeschooling with other work for parents. Space was also devoted to connecting people with people in similar positions, such as observant Jewish homeschooling families, single parents interested in homeschooling, and parents of children with intellectual disabilities.

Many articles criticized schools. These criticisms expressed concerns that schools stifle student motivation and creativity, interfere with learning, mistreat students with disabilities, maintain class hierarchy, and monopolize resources that would be better invested in libraries, museums and community centers.

== Leadership ==
Following Holt's death on September 14, 1985, Holt Associates took over the newsletter. Patrick Farenga served as managing editor with editors John Holt and Donna Richoux, Susannah Sheffer joined as associate editor for Issue #52, editor by Issue #58. Meredith Collins later served as editor.

== Legacy ==
One of the first documentaries about homeschooling, Grown Without Schooling, was named in homage to the magazine and profiled several of the grown homeschoolers who had written for it. Its producer, Peter Kowalke, also wrote occasionally for the magazine.

Everywhere All the Time: A New Deschooling Reader, edited by Matt Hern and published in 2008, includes a chapter on Growing without Schooling.
