= Susannah Sheffer =

Author, editor, and activist

- Occupations: Author; Editor; Activist
- Website: Personal website

Susannah Sheffer is an author, editor, and activist, focusing on issues of education, prisons, and the death penalty. She is a leader in the unschooling, deschooling, and homeschooling movement. She served on the board of Holt Associates, edited the newsletter Growing Without Schooling (GWS) for many years, and edited the book A Life Worth Living: Selected Letters of John Holt. She is currently a staff member of North Star, an alternative to middle school and high school in Massachusetts.

Her books include A Sense of Self: Listening to Homeschooled Adolescent Girls, Writing Because We Love To: Homeschoolers at Work, In a Dark Time: A Prisoner's Struggle for Healing and Change, and Fighting for Their Lives: Inside the Experiences of Capital Defense Attorneys. She has also published numerous articles, essays, and book chapters on related issues.
