= René Böttcher =

German actor, director and theater pedagogue

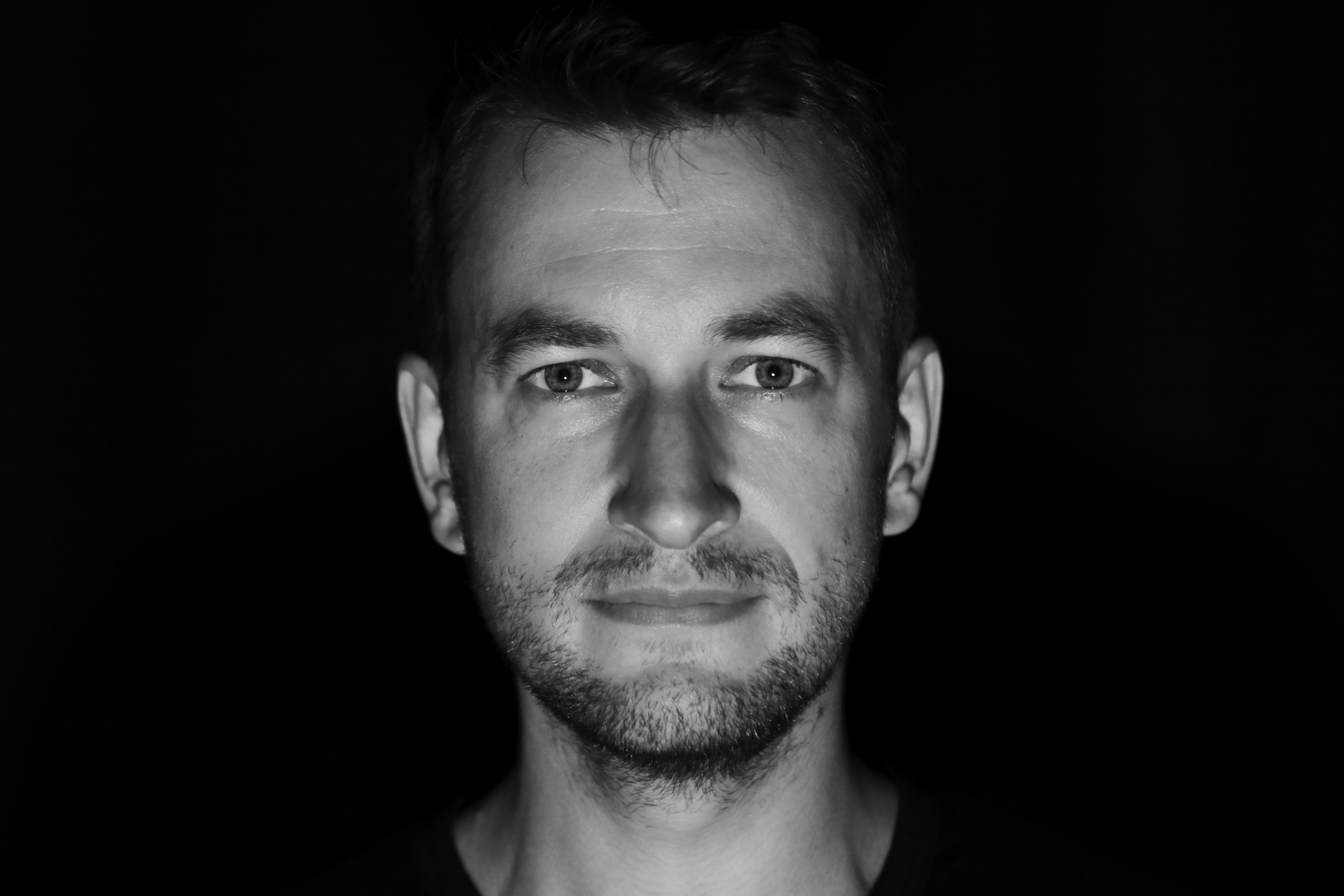
Böttcher in 2017

René Böttcher (born 1979) is a German actor, director and theater pedagogue. Since 2004, he has been the director of the state-approved, private Schauspielschule Siegburg and the associated private theater, the Studiobühne Siegburg.

== Life and career ==
Böttcher was born and raised in Dresden, Saxony. After his school education, he trained as an actor and director at the Bongôrt von Roy theater school in Siegburg, North Rhine-Westphalia, which is close to Bonn. He had various engagements as an actor in Leipzig and Koblenz.

When the director of the Siegburg Theaterfachschule, Wolf Bongôrt von Roy (actually Wolf Bongort-von Roy; 1942–2006), retired from Siegburg at the end of 2004, Böttcher took over the school and continued it as the Schauspielschule Siegburg, which he had newly founded. In 2004, the former principal Bongôrt-von Roy and some of the teachers went to Leipzig to found the Bongôrt-v. Roy theater school. At the same time, Böttcher took over as artistic director of the training stage belonging to the school, the Studiobühne Siegburg, which he also founded. At the same time, he founded a children's and youth theater at the Studiobühne, which later received its current name, Theater Tollhaus.

Since then, René Böttcher has run the private Siegburg Drama School together with actress and director Maike Mielewski. The school is recognized by the state as a vocational school for the performing arts in the form of a so-called supplementary school and regularly trains actors. The school, as well as the associated Studiobühne Siegburg and the Theater Tollhaus, is run by the registered association Theaterschatz e. V., of which Böttcher is also a board member. The association is recognized as a non-profit organization and has its headquarters in Siegburg.

In addition to directing the drama school and the studio stage, Böttcher works at the school as a theater pedagogue for acting and scene work and also takes on the direction of various productions of his own productions, which are regularly shown at the Studiobühne Siegburg as well as in part at guest performances at other theaters. For example, Böttcher directed Peter Turrini's one-person play Endlich Schluss (2006), with which he was also invited to a guest performance at the Theater am Schlachthof in Neuss, and the Greek tragedy Agamemnon after Aeschylus (2007/2008), in the fairy tale classics The Snow Queen by Hans Christian Andersen (2007/2008) and Heart of Stone by Wilhelm Hauff (2011/2012), and in the comedy A Dream of Marriage by Robin Hawdon (2011). In the 2012/2013 season, Böttcher directed, among others, the two-person drama norway.today by Igor Bauersima, which brought the Studiobühne numerous sold-out performances and with which he was invited to the Arkadaş Theater – Stage of Cultures in Cologne.

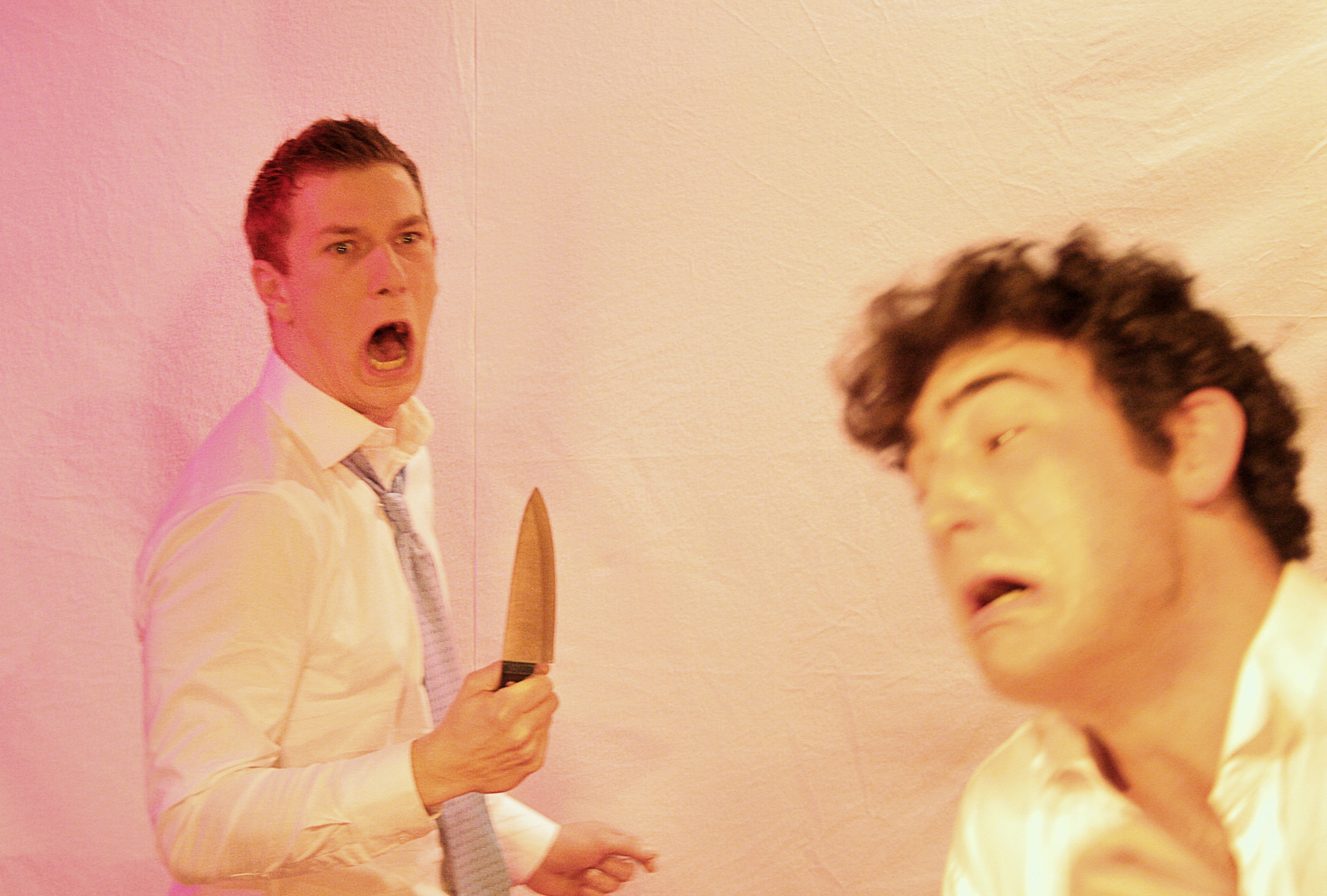
Böttcher (left) in the 2012 play Ein Traum von Hochzeit

In 2017, Böttcher wrote the thesis attack "95 Thesen gegen Schule" ("95 Theses against School") in cooperation with Bertrand Stern and others. In it, Böttcher calls for a move away from compulsory schooling in Germany and toward a civil right to educational freedom. It is addressed to school-aged people.

Böttcher lives in Siegburg.
