= Criticism of schooling =

Multiple positions critical of compulsory schooling laws

Anti-schooling activism, or radical education reform, describes positions that are critical of school as a learning institution and/or compulsory schooling laws; or multiple attempts and approaches to fundamentally change the school system. People of this movement usually advocate alternatives to the traditional school system, education independent from school, the absence of the concept of schooling as a whole, or the right that people can choose how, where and with whom they are educated.

These attitudes criticize the learning atmosphere and environment of school and oppose the educational monopoly of school and the conventional standard and practice of schooling for reasons such as:

- regarding the use of compulsory schooling as a tool of assimilation;
- the belief that an overly structured and predetermined learning system can be detrimental for children and would encourage certain temperaments while inhibiting others;
- the related belief that the school environment prevents learning rather than encouraging the innate natural curiosity by using unnatural extrinsic pressures such as grades and homework;
- the view that school prescribes students exactly what to do, how, when, where and with whom, which would suppress creativity,
- and/or the conviction that schooling is used as a form of political or governmental control for the implementation of certain ideologies in the population.

Another very persistent argument of anti-schooling activists is that school does not adequately prepare children for their life outside of school, and that most teachers do not have a neutral and comprehensive view of the world because they have only attended academic institutions a large part of their life.

Others criticize the forced contact in school and are of the opinion that school makes children spend a large part of their most important development phase in a building, in seclusion from society, exclusively with children in their own age group, seated and entrusted with the task of obeying the orders of one authority figure for several hours each day, while almost everything they do is assessed, which would be a dehumanizing experience.

Some may also feel a deep aversion to school based on their personal experiences or question the efficiency and sustainability of school learning and are of the opinion that compulsory schooling represents an impermissible interference with the rights and freedoms of parents and children; and believe that schools as a vehicle for knowledge transfer are no longer necessary and increasingly becoming obsolete in times of rapid information procurement, e.g. via the internet, and therefore generally consider compulsory education with evidence-based learning-oriented online schools or autodidactism to be more sensible than the traditional cohort-based physical schools.

== Arguments ==
=== Teaching as government control ===
A non-curriculum, non-instructional method of teaching was advocated by Neil Postman and Charles Weingartner in their book Teaching as a Subversive Activity. In inquiry education students are encouraged to ask questions which are meaningful to them, and which do not necessarily have easy answers; teachers are encouraged to avoid giving answers.

Murray N. Rothbard argues that the history of the drive for compulsory schooling is not guided by altruism, but by a desire to coerce the population into a mold desired by dominant forces in society.

John Caldwell Holt asserts that youths should have the right to control and direct their own learning, and that the current compulsory schooling system violates a basic fundamental right of humans: the right to decide what enters their minds. He thinks that freedom of learning is part of freedom of thought, even more fundamental a human right than freedom of speech. He especially states that forced schooling, regardless of whether the student is learning anything whatsoever, or if the student could more effectively learn elsewhere in different ways, is a gross violation of civil liberties.

Nathaniel Branden adduces government should not be permitted to remove children forcibly from their homes, with or without the parents' consent, and subject the children to educational training and procedures of which the parents may or may not approve. He also claims that citizens should not have their wealth expropriated to support an educational system which they may or may not sanction, and to pay for the education of children who are not their own. He claims this must be true for anyone who understands and is consistently committed to the principle of individual rights. He asserts that the disgracefully low level of education in America today is the predictable result of a state-controlled school system, and that the solution is to bring the field of education into the marketplace.

=== Corruption of children ===
Jean-Jacques Rousseau wrote in his book Emile: or, On Education (first published in 1762) that all children are perfectly designed organisms, ready to learn from their surroundings so as to grow into virtuous adults, but due to the malign influence of corrupt society, they often fail to do so. Rousseau advocated an educational method which consisted of removing the child from society—for example, to a country home—and alternately conditioning them through changes to environment and setting traps and puzzles for them to solve or overcome.

Rousseau was unusual in that he recognized and addressed the potential of a problem of legitimation for teaching. He advocated that adults always be truthful with children, and in particular that adults should declare the basis for their authority in teaching being one of physical coercion: "I'm bigger than you." Once children reached the age of reason, at about 12, they would be engaged as free individuals in the ongoing process of their own.

=== Grading ===
In Deschooling Society, Ivan Illich calls for the disestablishment of schools. He claims that schooling confuses teaching with learning, grades with education, diplomas with competence, attendance with attainment, and, especially, process with substance. He writes that schools do not reward real achievement, only processes. Schools inhibit a person's will and ability to self-learn, ultimately resulting in psychological impotence. He claims that forced schooling perverts the victims' natural inclination to grow and learn and replaces it with the demand for instruction. Further, the current model of schooling, replete with credentials, betrays the value of a self-taught individual. Moreover, institutionalized schooling seeks to quantify the unquantifiable – human growth.

=== Effects on local culture and economics ===
In some cases schooling has been used as a tool for assimilation and a both deliberate and inadvertent tool to change local culture and economics into another form. Opponents of this effect argue it is a human right for a culture to be maintained, and education can violate this human right. Forced schooling has been used to forcibly assimilate Native Americans in the United States and Canada, which some have said is cultural genocide. Many psychologists believe the forced assimilation of native cultures has contributed to their high suicide rates and poverty. Western education encourages Western modes of survival and economic systems, which can be worse and poorer than the existing modes of survival and economic systems of an existing culture.

=== School-related stress and depression ===
There are many factors that can cause schooling to be source of stress and depression in a person's life, which can have long-term health effects and mental disorders. School bullying can lead to depression and long term emotional damage. Societal and familial academic pressure and rigorous schooling can also lead to stress, depressions, and suicide. Academic pressure and rigorous schooling has been pointed to as a cause of the high rate of suicide among South Korean adolescents. General boredom from school can also cause stress, and low academic performance can lead to low self esteem. A student's family can suffer from academic-related stress as well.

=== Ineffective or counter to its purpose ===
Some of the proposed purposes of western style compulsory education are to prepare students to join the adult workforce and be financially successful, have students learn useful skills and knowledge, and prepare students to make positive economic or scientific contributions to society. Critics of schooling say it is ineffective at achieving these purposes and goals. In many countries, schools do not keep up with the skills demanded by the workplace, or never have taught relevant skills. Students often feel unprepared for college as well. More schooling does not necessarily correlate with greater economic growth. Alternate forms of schooling, such as the Sudbury model, have been shown to be sufficient for college acceptance and other western cultural goals.

Instead of being a way out of poverty and a way to stay away from crime, for many, school has the opposite effect. Schooling often perpetuates poverty and class divisions. At many schools, students are introduced to gangs, drugs and crime. The school-to-prison pipeline also converts children into criminals through overly harsh punishments. Punishments from truancy and other school-related laws also adversely effect students and parents.

=== Learning methods ===
In the eyes of many critics, memorization and pure reproduction of formulas, facts, knowledge, etc., as is usually required by many schools, is no longer up to date in times of rapid information procurement via the Internet. It neither demonstrates intelligence nor is it a useful skill that will take people far in today's world. Not least due to a lack of interest on the part of students and time pressure, it would often result in bulimic learning, making learning in schools an end in itself for many students. The skill of independently recognizing problems and developing solutions for them as well as an in-depth understanding of issues are prevented because the focus lies too much on reproducing only the facts necessary for an exam, without the need of understanding the underlying concepts.

=== Epistemological critiques ===
A distinct line of criticism argues that traditional schooling systematically presents knowledge in ways that are epistemologically misleading. Critics contend that curricula often treat knowledge as static, decontextualized, and uncontested, while suppressing uncertainty, historical failures, and marginalized perspectives. Research on textbook publishing has found that commercial pressures lead to content being "sanitized to avoid offending anyone", with publishers removing "anything controversial or potentially controversial", which can undermine critical thinking and historical accuracy.

Educational scholars have identified a "hidden curriculum of certainty" throughout the education system, arguing that schools ill‑prepare students for an uncertain world by presenting knowledge as settled and unambiguous, rather than as a product of ongoing inquiry. This is reinforced by curriculum frameworks that canonize certain content, making knowledge appear static and timeless while obscuring the debates, contingencies, and power relations that shaped it.

From a postcolonial perspective, critics note that educational content often reflects colonial power dynamics, even after political independence. As Mehringer and El‑Lahib argue, "knowledge production creates and maintains colonial dominance and unequal power relations between the Global North and the Global South" (2025). This critique aligns with the view that Western canons and classical models are often presented as universal truths, marginalizing indigenous and non‑Western epistemologies.

Some educational theorists call for replacing the traditional curriculum—based on a "canon of accepted thought"—with a "curriculum of uncertainty". In this alternative view, knowledge is understood as negotiated, contextual, and evolving; ambiguity becomes "a generative space for ethical inquiry", and embracing "not knowing" can foster intellectual humility. Proponents argue that such an approach restores critical thinking and real‑world relevance by acknowledging that knowledge is contested, incomplete, and shaped by multiple forces—including funding biases, cultural diversity, and systemic power relations.

== See also ==
- Career and technical education
- Criticism of homework
- Criticism of school grades
- John Taylor Gatto
- John Holt (American educator)
- Bertrand Stern
- Ivan Illich
- Philosophy of education
- Sudbury school
- Autodidacticism
- Deschooling
- Education
- Indigenous education § Criticism of the Western educational model
- Democratic education
- Alternative education
