= Single-parent homeschooling =

Single-parent homeschooling is the practice of conducting homeschool by a parent who may be the sole breadwinner for the family. According to the peer-review journal Education Policy Analysis, based on the findings of the National Household Education Survey, of the National Center of Educational Statistics, between 1994 and 1999 the number of single-parent homeschools almost doubled. No further statistics are currently available. It is the general perception, by most homeschooling advocates, that most single-parent homeschools are led by a self-employed single parent, one that is receiving public assistance, or someone that has received a life insurance settlement. In some single-parent homeschool circles it is thought that most-single parent homeschools are run by parents who work full-time jobs outside the home. No statistics have been compiled to confirm or invalidate either supposition.

== Problems ==
Single-parent homeschooling has its own unique problems. It has been well documented and researched from a variety of organizations from the United States Department of Education (DOE) to the United States Department of Justice (DOJ). It is agreed that the needs of children in single-parents households are different from the needs of their counterparts in two-parent households.

== Dual enrollment ==
Public school dual enrollment was designed so that high school students could attend college and high school at the same time. But in Colorado it is being allowed by public schools for homeschoolers. Dual enrollment allows students of any age to attend homeschool part-time, and the local public school part-time. It allows the public school to report increases in their enrollment numbers, and therefore increases in their tax allotment. It also allows homeschoolers to attend school while their parents are working. For example, if a single parent works outside of the home from 8AM to 5PM, instead of staying home alone all day, their children can attend a dual enrollment public school program in the morning, and then work on self-directed projects or on a self-selected volunteer job in the afternoon. If afternoon supervision is desired or required, afternoon hours can be spent at a two-parent friend's house, or even another single parent friend's house, until their parent get home from work.

== Support networks ==
According to the Home Educator's Family Times, single-parent homeschool support networks are instrumental to the success of single-parent homeschooling. Support networks can include grandparents, relatives, friends, neighbors, other homeschoolers from a church or religious organization, homeschool supplemental programs, traditional homeschool support groups, transportation like kid van pools, and volunteer work. To prevent gaps in education, substitutes or backups in the event of the failure of all or part of the support network are advised. As a side note, in this economy where the unemployment rate for teens can be as high as 38%, self-selected volunteer work is an option for any teen as it often leads to high-paying satisfying employment.

== See also ==
- Homeschooling
- Unschooling
