= Never Too Late =

Never Too Late may refer to:

== Books ==
- Never Too Late: My Musical Life Story, a 1979 autobiographical novel by John Caldwell Holt
- Never Too Late: A Prosecutor’s Story of Justice in the Medgar Evers trial, a 2001 book by Bobby DeLaughter

== Film and theatre ==
- Never Too Late (play), a 1962 Broadway play
- Never Too Late (1925 film), an American silent comedy action film
- Never Too Late (1935 film), an American film
- Never Too Late (1937 film), the U.S. release title of It's Never Too Late to Mend
- Never Too Late (1965 film), a film directed by Bud Yorkin, based on the play
- Never Too Late (1996 film), a Canadian drama/comedy film
- Never Too Late (2020 film), an Australian comedy film

== Music ==
=== Albums ===
- Never Too Late (Status Quo album) and the title track, 1981
- Never Too Late (Sammi Cheng album), 1992
- Never Too Late (Mario album)
- Never Too Late (Jimi Jamison album), 2012
- Never Too Late, a Hedley compilation album of singles

=== Songs ===
- "Never Too Late" (Hedley song), 2008
- "Never Too Late" (Kylie Minogue song), 1989
- "Never Too Late" (Sinitta song), 1983
- "Never Too Late" (Three Days Grace song), 2006
- "Never Too Late", song by the Answer from Rise, 2006
- "Never Too Late", song by Elton John from The Lion King, 2019
- "Never Too Late" (Elton John and Brandi Carlile song), 2024

== Other ==
- Never Too Late (horse), Thoroughbred racehorse

== See also ==
- It's Never Too Late (disambiguation)
