= How Children Fail =

Non-fiction book by John Caldwell Holt

- First edition
- Author: John Holt
- Language: English
- Subject: Education
- Genre: Non-fiction
- Publisher: Pitman Publishing Company (1964); Merloyd Lawrence Books, Delta/Seymour Lawrence Books(1982)
- Publication date: 1964, 1982 (revised)
- Publication place: United States
- Pages: 298 (1982 edition)
- ISBN: 0-201-48402-1
- OCLC: 32626803
- Dewey Decimal: 371.2/8 20
- LC Class: LB3063 .H627 1995

How Children Fail is a non-fiction book by John Holt that was published in 1964 and republished in 1982 in a revised edition. It has sold over a million copies. In it, he cites personal teaching and research experiences that led him to the belief that traditional schooling does more harm than good to a child's ability and desire to truly learn.

== Synopsis ==
In How Children Fail, John Holt states that children love to learn but hate to be taught. His experiences in the classroom as a teacher and as a researcher brought him to conclude that every child is intelligent. However, children become unintelligent because they are accustomed by teachers and schools to strive only for teacher approval and the “right" answers and consequently forget everything else. There, children see value not in thinking, discovery, and understanding but only in playing the power game of school.

Children believe that they must please and obey the teacher, the adults, at all costs. They learn how to manipulate teachers to gain clues about what the teacher really wants. Through the teacher's body language, facial expressions and other clues, they learn what might be the right answer. They mumble, straddle the answer, get the teacher to answer their own question, and take wild guesses while waiting to see what happens, all in order to increase the chances for a right answer.

When children are very young, they have natural curiosity about the world, trying diligently to figure out what is real. As they become "producers" rather than "thinkers," they fall away from exploration and start fishing for the right answers with little thought. They believe that they must always be right and so quickly forget mistakes and how the mistakes were made. They believe that the only good response from the teacher is a yes and that a no is a defeat.

They fear wrong answers and shy away from challenges because they may not have the right answer. That, in the school setting, does their thinking and learning a great disservice. A teacher's job is to help them overcome their fears of failure and explore the problem for real learning. Too often, teachers are doing the opposite, building children's fears up to monumental proportions. Children need to see that failure is honorable and that it helps them construct meaning. It should not be seen as humiliating but as a step to real learning. Being afraid of mistakes, they never try to understand their own mistakes and cannot and will not try to understand when their thinking is faulty. Adding to children's fear in school are corporal punishment and humiliation, both of which can scare children into right/wrong thinking and away from their natural exploratory thinking.

Holt maintains that when teachers praise students, they rob them of the joy of discovering truth for themselves. They should be aiding them by guiding them to explore and learn as their interests move them. In mathematics, children learn algorithms, but when faced with problems with Cuisenaire rods, they cannot apply their learning to real situations. Their learning is superficial in that they can sometimes spit out the algorithm when faced with a problem on paper, but they have no understanding of how or why the algorithm works and no deep understanding about numbers.

Holt believes that end of year achievement tests do not show real learning. Teachers (Holt included) generally cram for these tests in the weeks preceding. Meanwhile, the material learned is forgotten shortly after the tests because it was not motivated by interest and has no practical use.

== See also ==
- How Children Learn
- Unschooling
