= The Teenage Liberation Handbook =

1991 book by Grace Llewellyn

- Author: Grace Llewellyn
- Language: English
- Genre: Nonfiction
- Publisher: Lowry House Publishers
- Publication date: 1991
- Publication place: United States
- Media type: Print (Paperback)
- Pages: 435
- ISBN: 978-0-9629591-7-2

The Teenage Liberation Handbook: How to Quit School and Get a Real Life and Education, which was published in 1991 by Grace Llewellyn, is a book about unschooling and youth empowerment. Largely inspired by John Holt's educational philosophy, the book encourages teenagers to leave full-time school and to allow their curiosity about the world to guide their learning. It includes suggestions and resources regarding traditional academic areas, as well as chapters about talking to parents, social life, college, and exploring the world.
