= Arno Stern =

French pedagogue and researcher (1924–2024)

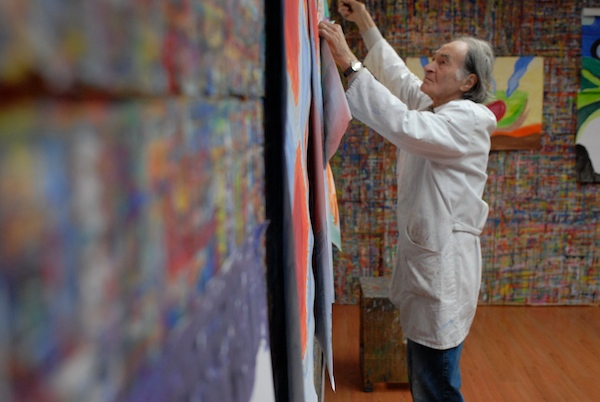
- Stern in his studio, the Closlieu on rue Falguière, Paris
- Born: 23 June 1924; Kassel, Hesse, Germany
- Died: 30 June 2024 (aged 100); Paris, France
- Occupations: Pedagogue; Researcher
- Spouse: Michéle Stern
- Children: 3, including Bertrand
- Website: arnostern.com

Arno Stern (23 June 1924 – 30 June 2024) was a German-born French pedagogue and researcher.

== Life and career ==
Stern was born on 23 June 1924, in Kassel, Hesse, Germany. He attended a school there for three years before emigrating to France with his parents after Hitler came to power. After the outbreak of World War II, the family continued to flee to Switzerland. Together with around 300 other refugees, Stern spent his youth there in a makeshift factory building until the end of the war. During this internment period, the refugees were looked after by aid agencies that provided them with books, including about art history. He was a refugee for 12 years. Stern also used his limited free time to draw in these years. After years of internment and statelessness, Stern returned to France with his family after the war and became a French citizen.

He was married to Michéle Stern and the couple have two sons (Bertrand Stern (born 1948) and André Stern (born 1971)) and a daughter (Elénore Stern (born 1978 or 1979)). His first son, Bertrand, went to school but did not like it there, which is why his later born children were unschooled.

Over time, the media became aware of Stern's work. He was interviewed several times, reports were made and he wrote articles about his work.

UNESCO also became aware of Stern and delegated him as an expert to the first international congress on art education in Bristol. On 9 September 2019 Stern was honored by UNESCO and the Paris-Sorbonne University.

Stern turned 100 on 23 June 2024. He died a week later, on 30 June.

== Writings ==
- Der Malort. With Eléonore Stern (images). Daimon, Einsiedeln 1998, ISBN 3-85630-573-4.
- Die natürliche Spur. Wenn die Mal-Lust nicht zu Werken führt. Verlag Mit Kindern wachsen, Freiburg 2001; La traccia naturale: quando il piacere di dipingere non si trasforma in opera, Luni, Milano 1997, ISBN 88-7984-074-6 OCLC 797609530 (in Italian).
- Das Malspiel und die natürliche Spur. Malort, Malspiel und die Formulation. Drachen Verlag, Klein Jasedow 2005, ISBN 3-927369-14-4: new edition 2012, ISBN 978-3-927369-14-6.
- Die Expression. Der Mensch zwischen Kommunikation und Ausdruck. Classen, Zürich 1994, ISBN 3-7172-0268-5; Klotz, Eschborn 2008, ISBN 978-3-88074-023-5.
- Stern, Arno; Stern, André (2011). Mein Vater, mein Freund – das Geheimnis glücklicher Söhne (in German). Munich: Zabert-Sandmann. ISBN 978-3-89883-291-5.
- Kalmann, Herbert (2012). Arno Stern (ed.). Erinnerungen an Europa – 1933–1949 (in German). Magdeburg: Sich Verlag. ISBN 978-3-942503-17-4.
- Wie man Kinderbilder nicht betrachten soll. Zabert-Sandmann, Munich 2012, ISBN 978-3-89883-328-8.
- Die Spur. Gewesenes Kindsein. Klotz, Magdeburg 2014, ISBN 978-3-88074-395-3.
- Das Malspiel und die Kunst des Dienens. Die Wiederentdeckung des Spontanen. Drachen, Klein Jasedow 2015, ISBN 978-3-927369-92-4.
- Das Malspiel und das Leben. Erinnerungen, Betrachtungen, Fragmente. Drachen, Klein Jasedow 2018, ISBN 978-3-947296-05-7.
