= How Children Learn =

1967 book by John Caldwell Holt

- First edition
- Author: John Holt
- Language: English
- Subject: Education
- Genre: Non-fiction
- Publisher: Pitman Publishing (1967); Delacorte Press (1983); Perseus Publishing (1995)
- Publication date: 1967, 1983 (revised)
- Publication place: United States
- Pages: 189 (1967 ed.), 303 (1983 ed.), 320 (1995 ed.)
- ISBN: 0-440-03835-9
- OCLC: 8786109
- Dewey Decimal: 370.15/23 19
- LC Class: LB1060 .H64 1983

How Children Learn is a nonfiction book by educator John Caldwell Holt, first published in 1967. A revised edition was released in 1983, with new chapters and commentaries. It is considered a prominent text in the homeschooling advocacy movement.

How Children Learn was Holt's second book and continues the argument of his earlier book How Children Fail in criticizing formal education. Like that book, it became a bestseller and, according to researcher Mel Allen, brought Holt considerable fame.

How Children Learn focuses on Holt's interactions with young children. The book is divided into five parts: "Games and Experiments", "Talk", "Reading", "Sports", and "Art, Maths and Other Things", each of which contains his observations of children learning. From them, he attempts to make sense of how and why children do the things they do. The central thesis of his work is that children learn most effectively by their own motivation and on their own terms. He writes that it encourages children to develop coping mechanisms and focus on getting out of tasks teachers want them to do, rather than encouraging them to learn.
