= Vigils for Peace =

Series of vigils in Germany, Austria, and Switzerland

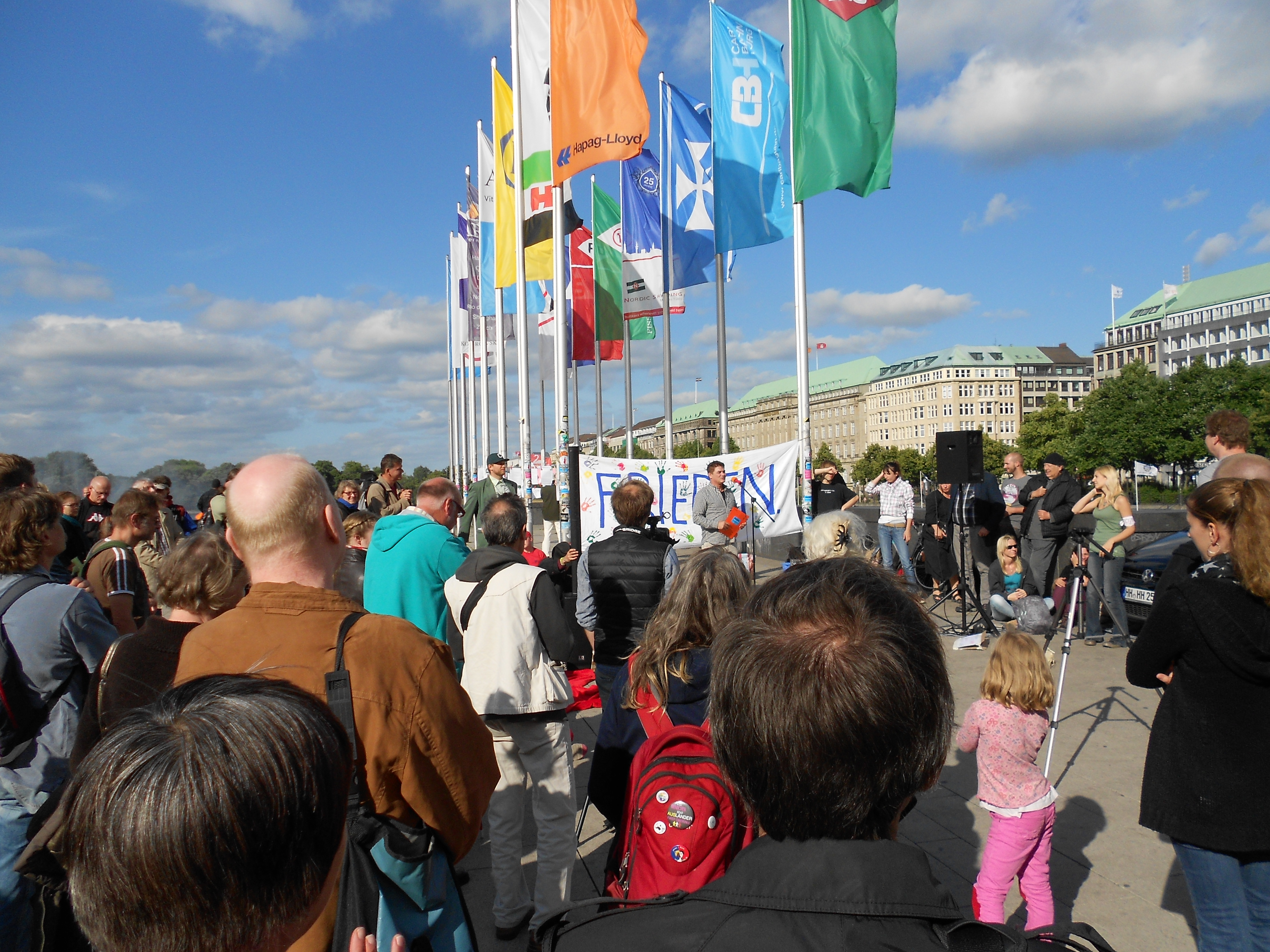
Vigil for Peace in Hamburg, 23 June 2014

Vigils for Peace (German: Mahnwachen für den Frieden) is the name of regular series of vigils that have taken place on Mondays in many cities in Germany, Austria, and Switzerland since March 2014. The vigils are explicitly not left-wing or right-wing in political orientation, although they are inspired by the Monday demonstrations in East Germany that took place in 1989 and 1990.

The vigils were triggered by the 2014 pro-Russian unrest in Ukraine and the concerns it generated in Germany about conflict and war, but a primary focus has been the Federal Reserve System in the United States and its argued effects on the global economy and political events.

== Vigils ==
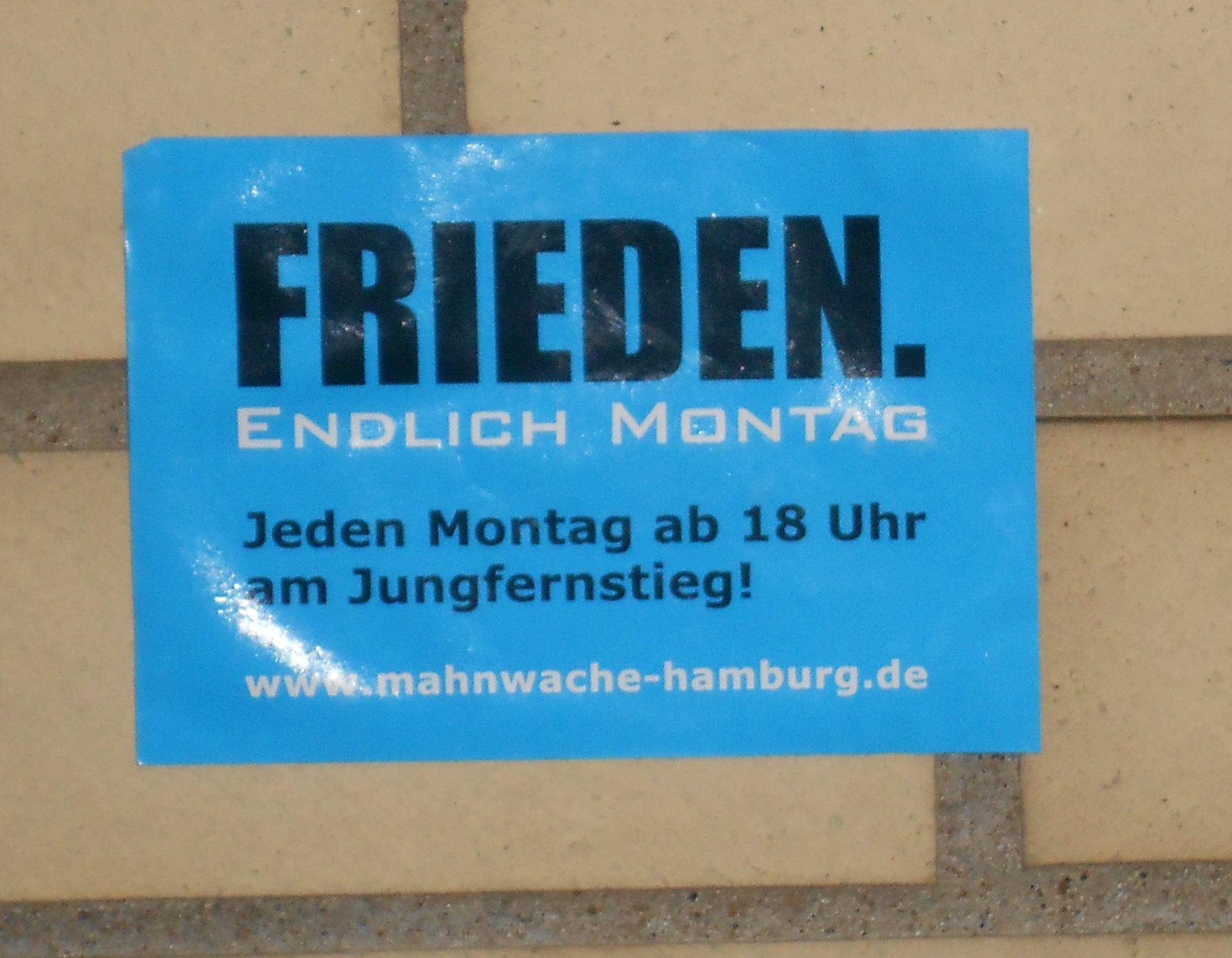
Sticker calling for participation in the Hamburg Vigil

The first "vigil for peace" was organized in March 2014 Brandenburg Gate in Berlin by Lars Mährholz, a professional skydiver and entrepreneur. Its slogan was: "For peace in Europe and the world, for an honest press, and against the deadly politics of the Federal Reserve (a private bank)." (German: "Für Frieden in Europa, auf der Welt, für eine ehrliche Presse und gegen die tödliche Politik der Federal Reserve [einer privaten Bank].") One of the speakers at the first vigil was Ken Jebsen, a former television and radio anchor for the Rundfunk Berlin-Brandenburg, and he soon became a prominent figure in the movement and the regularly-occurring vigils in Berlin. The vigils in Berlin were soon emulated by other activists in over 80 other cities in German-speaking countries, who used Facebook and social media to set the meeting times and locations. At the beginning of June, organizers of several vigils also gathered in Senftenberg.

== Speakers ==
In addition to Jebsen, journalist Jürgen Elsässer and Andreas Popp, a critic of the interest-based banking system, spoke at the first vigil. In May, other speakers included musician Prinz Chaos and former Attac activist Pedram Shahyar. On 9 June, Diether Dehm, a politician of The Left party, spoke and sang at the Berlin vigil, triggering internal party discussions about the value and political orientation of the movement.

== Participants ==
In May 2014, the Center for Technology and Society ("Zentrum Technik und Gesellschaft") at Technische Universität Berlin administered a survey of vigil participants. They reported that their survey showed that participants were younger, better educated, and more active on the Internet than the average member of the German public. 38% of participants identified themselves more with the left, although a greater percentage, 39%, rejected the left-right political schema entirely. In terms of voting orientation in the 2013 Bundestag elections, participants displayed overproportional votes for The Left, the Pirate Party, and the Alternative for Germany party. A third of participants did not vote or did not enter valid ballots.

== Reception ==
Some members of the Left Party, including Andrej Hunko, Heike Hänsel, Sabine Leidig, and Volker Külow, have argued that solidarity with the vigils is worthwhile. However, on 25 and 26 May, the official federal party organ distanced itself from the vigils, arguing that the claimed participation of "right-wing populists, nationalists, conspiracy theorists, and anti-Semites" can serve to make Third Position strategies "socially acceptable".
