= Manova News =

German online magazine

- Website type: Journalism portal
- Available in: German
- Owner: Jens Wernicke
- Website: www.manova.news
- Commercial: Yes
- Registration: No
- Launched: 2017
- Current status: Active

Manova News, formerly branded Rubikon, is a German online blog described to be following the Querfront strategy as well as spreading conspiracy ideologies. The motto of the blog is "Magazine for Freedom and Peace, Environment and Human Rights".

Owner, publisher and deputy editor-in-chief is the German Jens Wernicke. Editor-in-chief is Roland Rottenfußer.

== Economic and legal basis ==
Rubikon is owned and operated by Jens Wernicke's non-profit company called Initiative zur Demokratisierung der Meinungsbildung gemeinnützige GmbH (Initiative for the Democratization of Opinion Formation non-profit GmbH) and is based in Mainz. In 2017 Wernicke, Dr. Johannes Hofbauer (Wien) and Dirk Sadlowski founded and owned the company. In 2018 Jens Wernicke was sole shareholder and managing director. Since 2021 is Jana Pfligersdorffer sole shareholder and managing director. There was a change in 2023 due to trademark problems. The editorial office has moved and is now working under manova.news since 8 April 2023. The Manova.news-archive lists articles previously published in "Rubikon – The Magazine for the Critical Mass".

According to Initiative for the Democratization of Opinion Formation non-profit GmbH, the website is entirely financed by donations. When all company shares were in the sole ownership of editor-in-chief Wernicke, who was also the sole managing director.

== Content ==
Content on the website is written by various authors. In the early days of the blog, some authors supported Rubikon as an independend media outlet to amplify progressive discourse within German society.

German publicist Wolf Wetzel, who wrote at Rubikon from its foundation until his departure in 2018, criticized this construction for having „eine [...] klare [...] Hierarchie“ ("a [...] clear [...] hierarchy"): „Gesellschafter, Herausgeber, Geschäftsführer, Chefredakteur. Von »unten« gibt es kein Durchkommen, kein Gegengewicht, keine Form der »Gewaltenteilung«, keine Möglichkeit, den Kurs zu beeinflussen. Das Ganze hängt folglich ganz vom Goodwill des Herausgebers und Geschäftsführers ab, der sich gleichzeitig den Posten des Chefredakteurs zugedacht hat“ ("Shareholder, publisher, managing director, editor-in-chief. From »below« there is no getting through, no counterweight, no form of »separation of powers«, no possibility of influencing the course. The whole thing therefore depends entirely on the goodwill of the publisher and managing director, who has also intended to be editor-in-chief"). According to him, no effective influence is possible via the editorial statute.

In the first few years after its founding, Rubikon quickly developed into a medium in which crude political theses were disseminated with the impetus to represent suppressed opinions.

== Reception ==
=== Scientific reception ===
The Americanist Michael Butter includes Rubikon in the alternative media with outlets such as KenFM, Telepolis or NachDenkSeiten, which would all form a counter-public to the traditional quality media and public broadcasting. They used conspiracy theories like that of the "lying press" and sold them as serious news.

=== Journalistic reception ===
When the website was launched for three months in 2017, the journalist Christiane Enkeler told Deutschlandfunk that the magazine presented itself as „sehr heterogen“ ("very heterogeneous"). According to her, the critical analysis of leading media was successful. Overall, Rubikon would still be in development.

Simon Hurtz referred to the website in the Süddeutsche Zeitung in 2020 as „Querfront-Magazin“. Roger Schawinski calls it an „Internetportal mit Verschwörungstheoretiker-Groove“ ("Internet portal with a conspiracy theorist groove").

According to Erik Peter from taz, during the COVID-19 pandemic, Rubikon became a platform for the conspiracy scene in Berlin that negated the danger of the virus. Der Spiegel called Rubikon „eine Art Hausmedium der Protestler“ ("a kind of in-house media for protesters") around Anselm Lenz, in which „verschwörungsideologische Beiträge“ ("contributions to the ideology of conspiracies") were published again and again.
