= It's Never Too Late =

It's Never Too Late may refer to:

- It's Never Too Late (1953 film), an Italian comedy directed by Filippo Walter Ratti
- It's Never Too Late (1956 film), a British comedy directed by Michael McCarthy
- It's Never Too Late (TV series), a Scottish TV series presented by Tam Cowan
- "It's Never Too Late" (Batman: The Animated Series), an episode of the TV series Batman: The Animated Series
- It's Never Too Late (Monk Montgomery album)
- It's Never Too Late (Tommy Emmanuel album)
- "It's Never Too Late", a song by Diana Ross from Why Do Fools Fall in Love
- "It's Never Too Late", a single from the Steppenwolf album At Your Birthday Party
- "It's Never Too Late", a song by Carole King from the album Colour of Your Dreams
- "It's Never Too Late", a song by Tom Fletcher from the musical Paddington

== See also ==
- Never Too Late (disambiguation)
