= Schulpflicht =

Statutory regulation in Germany

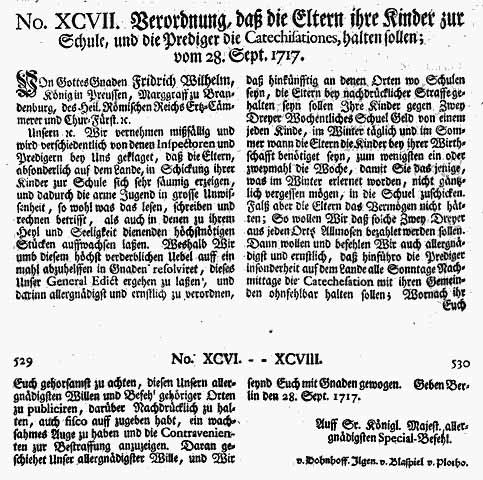
Royal decree introducing compulsory schooling in Prussia, 1717

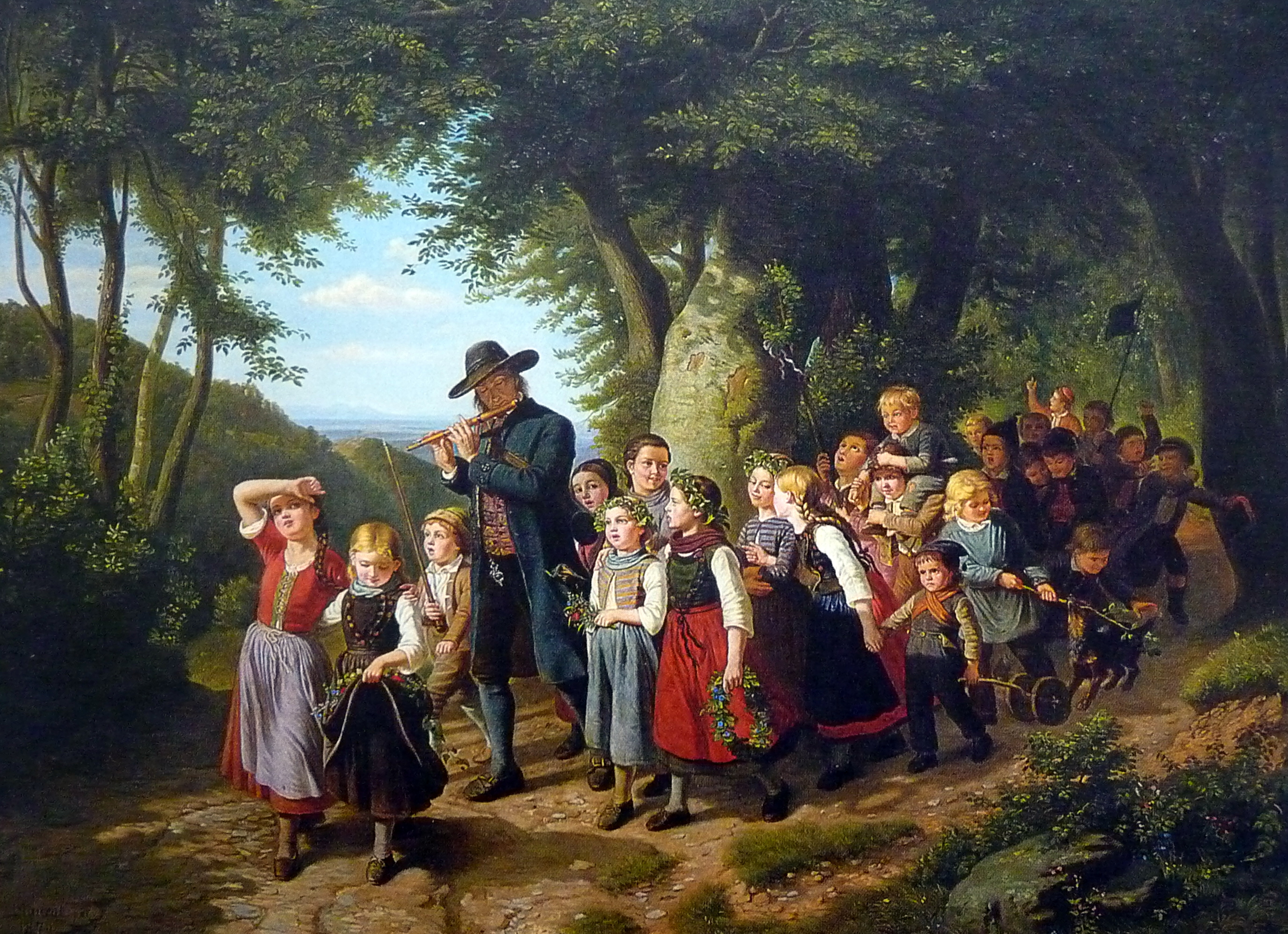
Participation in school trips is also compulsory for school-aged children in Germany.

The (Allgemeine) Schulpflicht (English: (General) Compulsory Schooling) is a statutory regulation in Germany that mandates children and adolescents up to a certain age (which is 18 in all federal states) to attend a school. The Schulpflicht includes not only regular and punctual school attendance, but also participation in lessons and other school events, as well as doing homework.

Simple laws, the so-called Schulgesetze (School Laws), regulate the implementation. The police are often used in this process. Children whose parents refuse to have them vaccinated must also go to school.

The German courts have generally interpreted the law as dictating that all school-aged kids in Germany must attend school until their 18th birthday, and that any unreasonable absence from lessons under the age of 18 is a crime. It is considered one of the very few compulsory school attendance laws in a developed, non-dictatorial country, since most democracies have compulsory education laws instead, meaning that education may also take place independent from school, as recorded in the article Homeschooling international status and statistics. Its justification, supposed benefits and motivations are disputed and controversially discussed.

== History ==
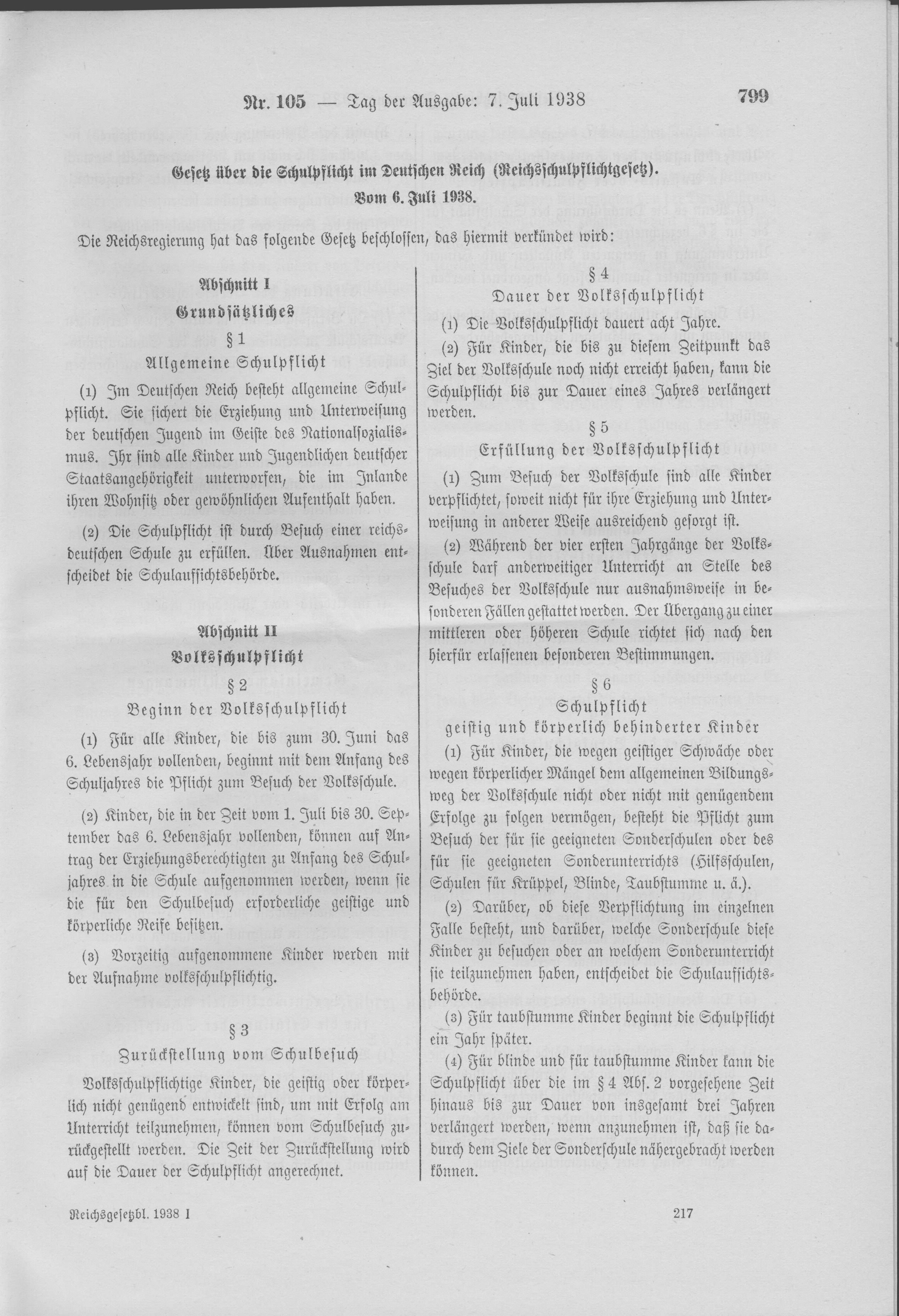
Reichsschulpflichtgesetz from July 6, 1938

In 1919, the Weimar Constitution stipulated the Schulpflicht for all of Germany, from 1938 to 1945 the Schulpflicht im Deutschen Reich (Compulsory Schooling in the German Empire), abbreviated as the Reichsschulpflichtgesetz (Empire Compulsory Schooling Act), was in effect. This law classified people with complex disabilities as unfit for education. For the disabled, compulsory schooling was not introduced until 1978, regardless of the type and intensity of the disability.

Initially, the Schulpflicht applied only to children with German citizenship. It was extended to foreign-born children in the 1960s. For asylum seeker children in North Rhine-Westphalia for example, it was introduced in 2005. Previously, there had been at most a right to attend school.

== Positions ==
=== Advocacy ===
The Schulpflicht serves to enforce the state's educational mandate. This mandate is also officially aimed at educating the students as future citizens. The Federal Constitutional Court ruled that schools are better suited than other ways of education for this purpose, as they claim that „Kontakte mit der Gesellschaft und den in ihr vertretenen unterschiedlichen Auffassungen nicht nur gelegentlich stattfinden, sondern Teil einer mit dem regelmäßigen Schulbesuch verbundenen Alltagserfahrung sind“ ("contacts with society and the different views represented in it do not only take place occasionally, but are part of an everyday experience associated with regular school attendance").

The Federal Agency for Civic Education (bpb) argues for the Schulpflicht that „Die Allgemeinheit hat ein berechtigtes Interesse daran, der Entstehung von religiös oder weltanschaulich motivierten, Parallelgesellschaften' entgegenzuwirken und Minderheiten zu integrieren [...]“ ("The general public has a legitimate interest in counteracting the emergence of religiously or ideologically motivated 'parallel societies' and in integrating minorities...") and claims that „Unsere Gesellschaften sind [...] nur möglich, weil es Schulen gibt, die allen Kindern die notwendigen Voraussetzungen für die Kommunikation vermitteln, das heißt sowohl Kulturtechniken als auch die Orientierung an kulturellen Normen und Werten“ ("Our societies are... only possible because there are schools that provide all children with the necessary prerequisites for communication, that is, both cultural techniques and an orientation towards cultural norms and values"). In addition, they claim that homeschooling is „[...] von radikalen bibelgläubigen christlichen Eltern gefordert [...]“ ("...demanded by radical bible-believing Christian parents..."). The bpb also thinks that the Schulpflicht does not just mean that all children have to go to school, but also that all children have the right to attend school, although this would not require compulsory schooling, which is why some people see this as a misappropriation of the word. They claim that it is one of the children's rights to attend school, although the children's rights education does not state that this has to be mandatory.

The then CSU chairman Erwin Huber justified the Schulpflicht in September 2008 with the following explanation:

Die allgemeine Schulpflicht gilt als eine unverzichtbare Bedingung für die Gewährleistung der freiheitlichen demokratischen Grundordnung und zugleich als unerlässliche Voraussetzung für die Sicherung der wirtschaftlichen und sozialen Wohlfahrt der Gesellschaft. Sinn und Zweck der Schulpflicht ist nicht nur die Vermittlung von Lehrplaninhalten, sondern insbesondere auch die Schulung der Sozialkompetenz der Kinder. Die Sozialkompetenz wird durch das Lernen in der Klassengemeinschaft und durch gemeinsame Schulveranstaltungen in besonderem Maße gefördert. Neben der Förderung der Sozialkompetenz hat die Schule auch die Funktion, während der Unterrichtszeit auf das Kindeswohl zu achten. Würde man Ausnahmen von der Schulpflicht zulassen, müsste diese Aufgabe von den Jugendämtern übernommen werden. Die Bayerische Verfassung will mit der allgemeinen Schulpflicht alle Kinder und Jugendlichen gleichermaßen und umfassend in die Gesellschaft eingliedern. Dies ist eine der großen emanzipatorischen und demokratischen Entwicklungen des 19. Jahrhunderts.

General Compulsory Schooling is considered an indispensable requirement for guaranteeing the free democratic basic order and at the same time an essential condition for securing the economic and social welfare of the society. The meaning and purpose of Compulsory Schooling is not only to convey the content of the curriculum, but also, in particular, to train the children's social skills. Social skills are particularly promoted through learning in the class community and through joint school events. In addition to promoting social skills, school also has the function of paying attention to the child's well-being during class time. If there were exceptions from Compulsory Schooling, this task would have to be taken over by the youth welfare offices. With Compulsory Schooling, the Bavarian Constitution aims to integrate all children and young people equally and comprehensively into society. This is one of the great emancipatory and democratic developments of the 19th century.

=== Criticism ===
The Schulpflicht has frequently faced criticism from various groups overtime.

Some argue that it violates article 26 (3) of the Universal Declaration of Human Rights, which states: "Parents have a prior right to choose the kind of education that shall be given to their children." and the freedom of assembly. Some people also see the Schulpflicht as a form of deprivation of liberty. There are also people who find that the Schulpflicht violates article 5 of the Universal Declaration of Human Rights.

The UN special rapporteur on the right to education, Vernor Muñoz, expressed concern in his report published in Berlin on February 21, 2006, that the restrictive German compulsory education system criminalizes the use of the right to education through alternative forms of learning such as homeschooling. University President Dieter Lenzen criticizes that Germany, unlike seven other European countries and the US, adheres to a rigid school attendance requirement instead of leaving it to the parents to decide how and through whom children are educated.

In particular, the way the authorities deal with school-aged mentally or physically handicapped people and efforts cater to their needs are often criticized in Germany, since said group is also generally obliged to attend school in Germany.

Immigrants from Germany, who wanted to teach their children themselves, argued at an immigration court in the USA that the common practice in Germany of refusing parents permission to study at home as a substitute for schooling was political persecution. While in 2010 the immigration court accepted the arguments of the school refusers, the Board of Immigration Appeals rejected the family's application in May 2013 on the grounds that US immigration laws did not guarantee an automatic right to stay for anyone who experienced restrictions outside the United States that would not exist under the American constitution.

German philosopher and author Bertrand Stern sees it as a fundamental human right to be able to educate oneself freely (independent from an institution), which is violated by compulsory schooling and criticizes the German system of mandatory schooling in his books and publications, which he describes as „inhuman“ ("inhuman"), „verfassungswidrig“ ("unconstitutional") and „obsolet“ ("obsolete") and having „[...] überhaupt keinen Platz mehr in unserer Wirklichkeit“ "...no longer any place in our reality". He thinks that the Schulpflicht will be abolished very soon.

German neurobiologist and author Gerald Hüther criticizes the Schulpflicht as degrading children as self-determined subjects to incapacitated objects of schooling. In his opinion, school should be a place which children are motivated to attend voluntarily and enthusiastically. He thinks that it is „[...] das Furchtbarste, das einem überhaupt passieren kann [...]“ ("...the most terrible thing that can ever happen to you..." if you ask young people why they go to school and their only answer is „Weil ich muss“ ("Because I have to") and that children want to learn naturally when they are born. He is also of the opinion that schools in Germany are deliberately designed to push pupils towards being passive consumers and detached from the political system when they grow up, „[...] damit wir genügend Kunden für den Müll haben, den wir hier ihnen andrehen wollen [...]“ ("...so that we have enough customers for the rubbish that we want to sell them here...").

German philosopher Richard David Precht considers it questionable to dictate to children how to spend a large part of their most formative and most important developmental phase and questions whether there is a need in the name of education to „[...] Kindern 10.000 Stunden [an] Lebenszeit abzuzwacken“ ("...stifle children 10,000 hours [of] life"). He is of the opinion that in times of easy access to information via the Internet, it is harder to justify the necessity for schools. He believes that schools have lost their role as the primary provider of knowledge to the next generation and their learning objectives should therefore shift the focus to promoting a child's development in areas such as personality, teamwork and creativity. He assumes that in the future more and more parents will ask themselves why they should send their children to school.

Some educational researchers see the Schulpflicht as counterproductive and sometimes leading to lower performance on the part of students and less interest in some topics. The sociologist Ulrich Oevermann, for example, is in favor of abolishing the Schulpflicht viewing it as unhelpful for creating better educated young people. He criticizes the „Trichterpädagogik“ ("funnel pedagogy") and conceives a Socratic maeutic pedagogy of understanding.

German lawyer with focus on school and administration law and member of the Vorstand des Bundesverbandes für Bildungsfreiheit Andreas Vogt sees it as a human right to be able to educate his children at home instead of in school. He says: „So rigide und repressiv wie Deutschland agiert in Europa kein anderer Staat.“ ("No other state in Europe is as rigid and repressive as Germany.")

It is sometimes argued that the Schulpflicht assumes that children are unwilling or unable to educate themselves or to be educated outside a school and parents lack the ability to raise their children independently.

On December 8, 2014, German radio station Deutschlandfunk Kultur did an interview with a German father who unschools his children and argued that the purpose of the Schulpflicht is to „[...] lernen, sich unterzuordnen [...]“ ("...learn to submit ..."). He thinks that the Schulpflicht „[...] Lernen behindert und Mündigkeit erstick [...]“ ("...hinders learning and stifles maturity...") and that communication and discussion are strictly regulated in school, which is why he does not see school as a suitable place where socialization can take place.

On November 8, 2018, police wanted to force a 15-year-old school refuser to attend school in Halle-Neustadt and came to her home, whereupon she fled to the balcony and jumped down. Resuscitation measures were carried out and the victim was taken to hospital. At around 8:55 a.m., the police were informed by the rescue control center that the girl had died despite intensive treatment.

Some believe the Schulpflicht is maintained because they think school costs like tutoring and school trips are an important economic factor in Germany.

It has been criticized that the Schulpflicht is also maintained during the COVID-19 pandemic in many German states, which increases the likelihood that students will be infected. The hygiene measures in German schools are also criticized, and politicians are accused of denying that there are many Corona cases in German schools. There were also demonstrations organized by students themselves. Baden-Württemberg ist the only state in Germany that has temporarily suspended the school attendance factor of the Schulpflicht for undefined time, meaning that students can take advantage of distance education if their parents request it. After estimates of the Deutscher Lehrerverband, 300,000 students (about 2.7% of all students) and 30,000 teachers in Germany are in quarantine as of November 2020.

According to German business journalist Rainer Hank, the Schulpflicht and the associated educational monopoly harm learning. He thinks that this monopoly is not best interests of children and that there are many factors which speak against the quality of state schools in Germany such as repeated poor results in the Pisa findings and the increasing student exodus to private schools.

German pedagogue Volker Ladenthin thinks that German parents have more confidence in the state than in most other countries which is why many people in Germany do not question the Schulpflicht.

The argument that parallel societies would be formed without compulsory schooling is criticized as experience from other countries suggest that this is not the case and many see school itself as a kind of parallel society. For example, it is criticized that many of the things taught in schools have little relation to everyday life and that many things that are important for life are not taught in schools.

==== Positions of political parties ====
In their 2016 party program, the Alternative für Deutschland (AfD) suggested abolishing the Schulpflicht and giving parents the right to choose whether their children attend a school or are being educated at home. This homeschooling must be conducted by a private tutor and has to adhere to the "same quality standards" that apply to state schools.

German libertarian party Party of Reason (PDV) has argued for replacing the Schulpflicht with a compulsory education law in its party program, arguing that compulsory schooling specifies how education should be achieved, although school may not be ideally suited as a form of education for everyone. The party also criticizes „[...] Das [...] staatliche Bildungsmonopol [...]“ ("...The... state educational monopoly..."), arguing that „[...] die Geschichte [hat] uns gelehrt, dass der Staat kein neutraler Spieler in der Bildung ist [...]“ ("...history [has] taught us that the state is not a neutral player in education..."). They say that „Bildung ist von so großer Bedeutung, dass sie keinem politischen Einfluss unterliegen darf“ ("Education is so important that it cannot be subject to political influence") and claim that the Schulpflicht was introduced under Adolf Hitler so that children's education could be controlled by the state.

The Pirate Party Germany is also working to replace compulsory schooling in Germany with compulsory education. The argument put forward is that „[...] Bildung auch außerhalb von Institutionen erworben werden kann.“ ("...education can also be acquired outside of institutions.") According to the party, compulsory schooling prevents people from „alternative Bildungswege [zu] beschreiten“ ("pursuing alternative educational paths"). Furthermore, „Jeder Mensch [...] das Recht auf freien und selbstbestimmten Zugang zu Wissen und Bildung.“ ("Everyone... has the right to free and self-determined access to knowledge and education.") In addition, „Der Erwerb von Abschlüssen [und Wissen] muss unabhängig davon möglich sein, wie und wo gelernt wurde [...]“ ("the acquisition of qualifications [and knowledge] must be possible regardless of how and where learning took place...". Visits should finally ensure that „[...] die Lernenden sich tatsächlich und mit hinreichendem Erfolg bilden.“ ("...the learners actually educate themselves and with sufficient success.")

The chairman of the youth association of the FDP Junge Liberale, Matti Karstedt, advocates replacing compulsory schooling in Brandenburg with compulsory education, „[...] damit Familien die größtmögliche Freiheit in Bildungsfragen ihrer Kinder erhalten.“ ("...so that families have the greatest possible freedom in the educational issues of their children.") Certificates of achievement must be provided outside of school. If the educational requirements are not met or the evidence is not provided, compulsory schooling should begin for these children at the beginning of the next school year.

The minor parties Allianz Deutscher Demokraten, Die Violetten, Deutsche Mitte and Bündnis C are also calling for the introduction of compulsory education instead of compulsory schooling in Germany.

The Anarchist Pogo Party of Germany wanted to abolish the Schulpflicht, though not stating whether it wants to replace it with a compulsory education law instead.

The Transhumane Partei Deutschland argued for the "development and testing of modern alternatives to compulsory school attendance".

== Literature ==
- Hermann Avenarius, Hans Heckel, Hans-Christoph Loebel: Schulrechtskunde. Ein Handbuch für die Praxis, Rechtsprechung und Wissenschaft. 7. Auflage. Luchterhand, Neuwied 2006, ISBN 3-472-02175-6.
- Bertrand Stern: Schluß mit Schule! – das Menschenrecht, sich frei zu bilden. Tologo Verlag, Leipzig 2006, ISBN 3-9810444-5-2.
- Bertrand Stern: Schule? Nein danke! Für ein Recht auf freie Bildung! In: Kristian Kunert (publisher): Schule im Kreuzfeuer. Auftrag – Aufgaben – Probleme. Ringvorlesung zu Grundfragen der Schulpädagogik an der Universität Tübingen. Schneider Verlag Hohengehren, Baltmannsweiler 1993, ISBN 3-87116-918-8.
- Bertrand Stern: Zum Ausbruch aus der Beschulungsideologie: Gute Gründe, auch juristisch den Schulverweigerern unser prospektives Vertrauen zu schenken. In: Matthias Kern (publisher): Selbstbestimmte und selbstorganisierte Bildung versus Schulpflicht. tologo, Leipzig 2016, ISBN 978-3-937797-59-5.
- Pachtler, Georg Michael (1876), Die geistige Knechtung der Völker durch das Schulmonopol des modernen Staates (in German), Habbel, OCLC 1070781020
- Schlaffke, Winfried. (1997), Freie Schulen – eine Herausforderung für das staatliche Schulmonopol (in German), Adamas-Verl, ISBN 3-925746-48-X, OCLC 75882418
