= Wolf Wetzel =

German author, journalist and publicist

- Born: 1956 (age 69–70)
- Occupations: Author; Journalist; Publicist
- Website: Personal website (in German)

Wolf Wetzel (born 1956) is a German author, journalist and publicist. He is the author of several books and publishes in various media, including Der Freitag, junge Welt, and NachDenkSeiten. He wrote at Rubikon from its foundation in 2017 until his departure in 2018. Wetzel has also been a deputy board member of Business Crime Control since 2011.

== Works ==
- Krieg ist Frieden – Über Bagdad, Srebrenica, Genua, Kabul nach …. Unrast, Münster 2002, ISBN 3-89771-419-1.
- Tödliche Schüsse – Eine dokumentarische Erzählung. Unrast, Münster 2008, ISBN 978-3-89771-649-0.
- as publisher: Aufstand in den Städten. Unrast, Münster 2012, ISBN 978-3-89771-522-6.
- Der NSU-VS-Komplex – Wo beginnt der Nationalsozialistische Untergrund – wo hört der Staat auf. 3. Auflage. Unrast, Münster 2015, ISBN 978-3-89771-589-9.
- Der Rechtsstaat im Untergrund |Big Brother, der NSU-Komplex und notwendige Illoyalität. PapyRossa Verlag, Köln 2015, ISBN 978-3-89438-591-0.
- Die drei Hälften meines Lebens, Westend Verlag, 2024, ISBN 978-3-86489-455-8.
