= Self access language learning centers =

Self access language learning centers are educational facilities designed for student learning that is at least partially, if not fully self-directed. Students have access to resources ranging from photocopied exercises with answer keys to computer software for language learning. These centers are an outgrowth of a style of learning that can go by several names: learner-centered approach, learner autonomy or self-directed learning. These centers exist primarily in Asia, Europe and North America. Use of such facilities and the pedagogical theory they are based upon has its advantages and disadvantages. Proper use can result in a feeling of empowerment and better learning outcomes, but getting to the point where students and teachers can exploit them effectively can be problematic. For this reason, the structure of established self access centers varies from completely student-directed work with classroom immersion to programs that provide primarily tutor or instructor guidance for student work•

== Definition ==
Self access language learning promotes the approach where students study independently choosing from among different resources that are available. The theory behind this style of learning is that students, especially foreign language students, learn better if they have a say in how they learn. Self-access language learning is closely related to learner-centered approach, learner autonomy and self-directed learning as all focus on student responsibility and active participation for his/her own learning. This style of instruction is most often done in the setting of a self-contained learning environment or self-access center.

Self-access centers can be as simple as a classroom set aside with dictionaries and shelves of paper-based exercises to state-of-the-art digital centers with various types of computer- and Internet-based resources. What resources are available and how students are guided to use them depend on the financial resources available and how much learner autonomy an institution decides to give students.

=== Examples of self-access centers ===
- The Multimedia English Learning Center at the National Kaohsiung First University of Science and Technology in Taiwan has 60 computers, 2 service desks, 2 counseling rooms and discussion areas with sofas and tables. It is divided into two sections: a self-access program based on the university's intranet and self-directed learning materials available in the facility. It has 3 pedagogical goals: 1) to support English courses by reducing teacher workload 2) to make up for the limited time that large classes have for listening and speaking and 3) to foster autonomy and self-directive study strategies among students.
- The Language Learning Center at Offutt Air Force Base, Nebraska United States offers holds classes in 10 different language and provides self-learning materials in 57 languages. The center also has 22 computers with access to online language classes as well as a variety of self-paced learning materials.

=== Advantages ===
Some of the advantages of this form of learning is that students at the very least set the pace of their work. Depending on the individual center, students can also set the level and content of their work. Students can use these centers voluntarily or can have assignments to complete there. The major advantage, therefore, is flexibility, with the purpose of giving the students themselves the opportunity to tailor the course more to their learning needs and styles than a more traditional mode of teaching.

Use of multiple technologies in a more independent setting has been shown to improve motivation and increase students’ ability to work independently by taking more responsibility for their own learning. Students also report feeling more "empowered" by such modes of instruction.

=== Disadvantages ===
The major disadvantages of this mode has basically to do with the ability of both students and teachers to adapt and integrate this method effectively. Many students are not used to working independently, creating the need to provide guidance as to the use of this kind of center, at least in the beginning. One study reports that students do not seem to want too much freedom in their use of technology. 73% reported that they preferred a regularly scheduled lab time, with the facilitative presence of a teacher. Significantly less than half reported that they preferred completely free access to the lab or to do work at home on their own computer.

For teachers, the 'letting go' of control can be equally disorienting and it may seem that giving students such control depreciates teachers' skills and experience. Traditionally, teachers are used to being the center of student activity, controlling how, when and why students do what they do. Students have been expected to work in "lock-step" with the teacher orchestrating what students do to a very high degree. Teachers, in turn, rely on textbooks that allow little variation. Use of self-access center materials steer students way from the rigidity and "security" of this paradigm, causing teachers to lose their "all-powerful" and "all-knowing" position. This can cause problems integrating a self-access center due to political and institutional constraints.

Other possible problems have to do with availability of physical resources.

== Types ==
Fully Independent Learning
In its most extreme form of self-directed learning, students set their own curriculum and goals, self-accessing their progress. Teachers function only as "counsellors" who give feedback after students evaluate their learning.

Semi-Guided Learning
To address problems with student use of self-access centers, some centers make tutors available to give academic and a kind of psychological support. Students may or may not choose how self-directed or tutor-dependent they choose to be. While the academic effectiveness of a semi-independent study course has not been proven, student response to such a scheme in Hong Kong was very positive.

Self-access center combined with English-language writing center
In several universities in Taiwan, several universities such as National Taiwan University, Fu Jen Catholic University and National Sun Yat-Sen University, have joined the two facilities. While the union of the two facilities has not proved to provide any benefits, the idea has been promoted as a way to enhance both general writing skills, which in turn support the acquisition of other language skills such as reading, speaking and listening.

Online self-access learning
Online self-access or online language support, is a type of self-access learning. In its most basic form, online self-access involves institutions making language learning materials available online to students. More elaborate forms include opportunities for supporting learners online (e.g. through advisory sessions), tools for collaborative learning, e-portfolios, and active monitoring of student performance by the software. Examples of such systems include the University of Auckland's electronic learning environment and 'My English', developed at King Mongkut's University of Technology Thonburi, in Bangkok, Thailand. Many centres are using online resources from a variety of commercial English training services.

The KELP Project
The Kanda English Language Proficiency (KELP) program at Kanda University of International Studies in Japan is not a self-access center per se, but rather a program in which all English language classrooms become independent-learning or self-access centers. Work that is typically done in a self-access center as an adjunct to traditional classroom activities become the core of the program. Students, with help from the teacher, create what is essentially their own course. The teacher becomes a "facilitator" who 1) sets up the classroom with needed materials at workstations 2) trains students to make course plans and consults with them to prepare learning contracts and for teacher approval 3) Manages learner assessment by making checking records made by students of their own progress are accurate and 4) Maintains discipline in the classroom.

== See also ==
- Language education
