= Pat Farenga =

American writer and educational activist

Patrick Farenga
- Born: March 23, 1957 (age 69); Yonkers, NY
- Occupations: Writer; Publisher; Educational activist
- Known for: Advocating the modern unschooling/homeschooling movement
- Children: 3
- Website: http://www.johnholtgws.com

Patrick Farenga is an American writer and educational activist. He is known as a leading advocate of the modern homeschooling movement which started in the 1970s.

== Life ==
Born in Bronx, New York, Farenga worked closely with teacher and author John Caldwell Holt on his Boston-based magazine, Growing Without Schooling (GWS). After Holt's death in 1985, he took over as publisher of GWS and president of the parent company, Holt Associates, continuing publication until it ceased in 2001.

== Career and work ==
Farenga worked closely with John Holt on Growing Without Schooling (GWS), a groundbreaking magazine focused on learning outside traditional schools. Founded by Holt in 1977, GWS was the first periodical dedicated to homeschooling and unschooling (Holt’s preferred term for learning outside of school). After Holt's death in 1985 Farenga became the publisher of GWS, continuing publication until it ceased in 2001, and president of Holt Associates, the parent organization, now HoltGWS LLC.

Farenga is a prolific writer, and has authored or contributed to many of the other educational publications by Holt Associates. He has written articles for numerous publications including Mothering, Paths of Learning, Home Education Magazine, and The Bulletin of Science, Technology, and Society. He contributed chapters to The Encyclopedia of School Administration (1988) and A Parent's Guide To Homeschooling (2002). Among his works Farenga is perhaps best known as the author of The Beginner's Guide To Homeschooling (1998) and co-author of Teach Your Own: The John Holt Book of Homeschooling (2003, 2021).

== Advocacy and Influence ==
A prolific speaker, Farenga has presented at educational conferences worldwide in countries including Colombia, Ireland, France, England, Canada, and Italy and appeared on numerous radio and television programs in the United States and abroad as an expert on homeschooling and unschooling.

He operates the website John Holt/Growing Without Schooling (johnholtgws.com), which archives issues of GWS and provides resources for families pursuing alternative education. Farenga is also a founding member of the Alliance for Self‑Directed Education.

== Personal life ==
Farenga and his wife unschooled their three daughters, now adults, reflecting the educational philosophy he advocates. He lives in Massachusetts and continues his work as a writer, speaker, and consultant on self‑directed learning.
