= Never Too Late: My Musical Life Story =

First edition (publ. Delacorte Press)

Never Too Late: My Musical Life Story, is a memoir written by John Caldwell Holt (1923-1985), an educator and author. The book tells about his experience of learning to play the cello as an adult. The book was published in 1979, six years before his death.

== Never Too Late ==
In Never Too Late, Holt explores how the abilities of people are limited, but "not as limited as we think". A 40-year-old's taking up an instrument, learning it, and playing it very well was something not really heard of at the time. He explains that even though "there are still limits to what can be accomplished, they are farther away than we imagine." At first, Holt has trouble reading the music off the pages, keeping time and tuning his cello.
