= Grace Llewellyn =

American writer and educator

- Born: March 18, 1964 (age 62); Boise, Idaho
- Education: Carleton College
- Occupations: Author, publisher
- Writing career
- Genre: Non-fiction
- Subjects: Education, Youth studies

Grace Llewellyn (born March 18, 1964) is an American educator, author, and publisher. She is the founder of Lowry House Publishers, founder and director of Not Back To School Camp and The Hive: Self-Directed Learning for Teens.

== Biography ==
Llewellyn was born on 18 March 1964 in Boise, Idaho, United States. Her parents were a nurse and a geologist writer and she had five siblings.

She completed her B.A. from Carleton College in 1986. After teaching for three years, she came across the work of John Holt, which led her to reconsider her approach to education.

In 1991 she wrote The Teenage Liberation Handbook: How to Quit School and Get a Real Life and Education. At that time, home-schooling was illegal in some US states.

Llewellyn published the Teenage Liberation Handbook through her publishing company, Lowry House Publishers.

In 1996 she started Not Back to School Camp for independent learners; the camp has been running for over 25 years.

== Bibliography ==
- The Teenage Liberation Handbook: How to Quit School and Get a Real Life and Education (ISBN 0-9629591-7-0)
- Guerrilla Learning: How to Give Your Kids a Real Education With or Without School (ISBN 9780471349600) (with co-author Amy Silver) 2001
- Real Lives: Eleven Teenagers Who Don't Go to School Tell Their Own Stories (ISBN 9780962959127) 1993, 2005
- Freedom Challenge: African American Homeschoolers (ISBN 9780962959110) 1996

== See also ==
- Home schooling
- Unschooling
