= Ken Jebsen =

German journalist, activist, conspiracy theorist and former radio host (born 1966)

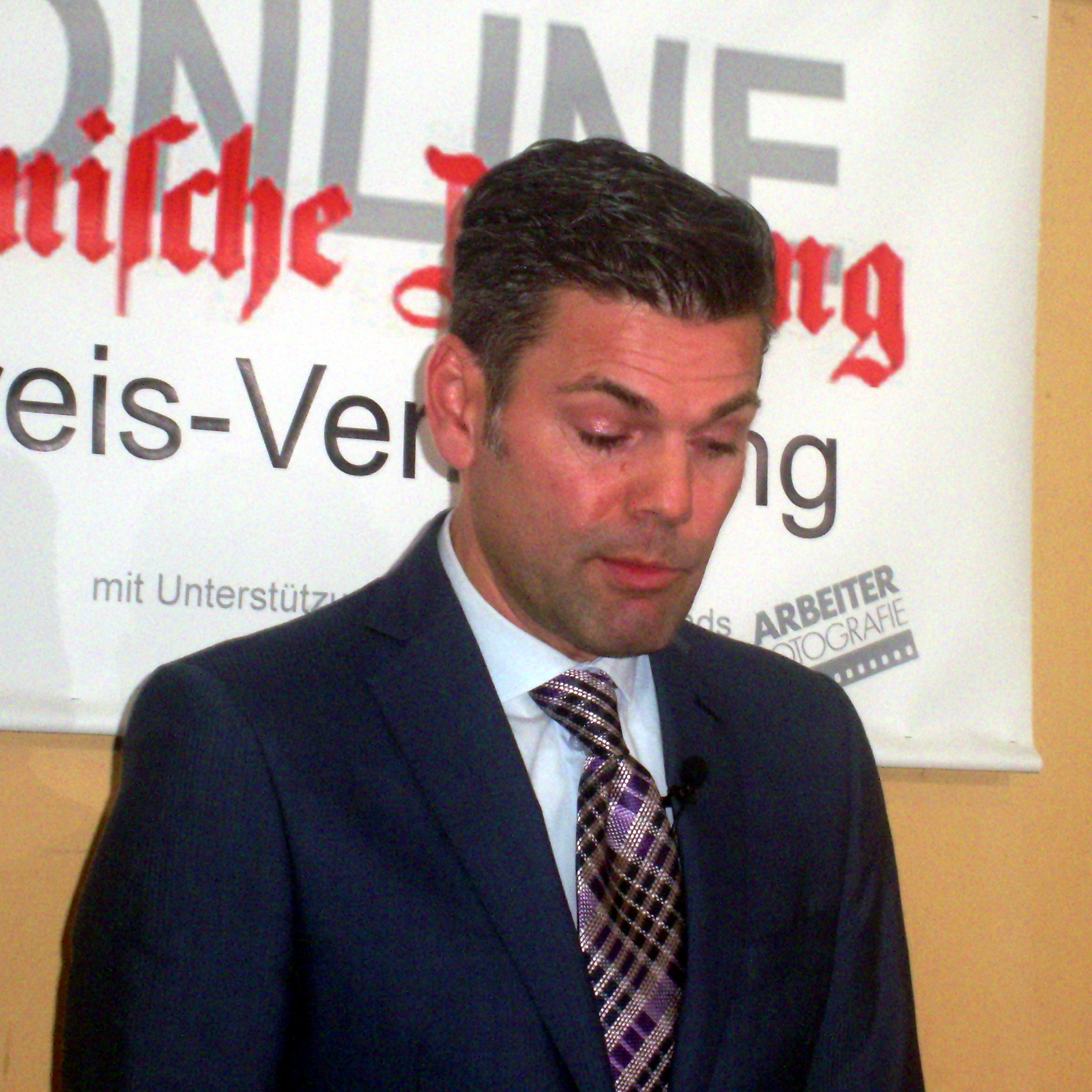
- Jebsen in 2014
- Born: Kayvan Soufi-Siavash; 1966 (age 59–60); Hüls, North Rhine-Westphalia, West Germany
- Awards: See Awards
- Presenting career
- Show: Radio Fritz
- Station: Rundfunk Berlin-Brandenburg
- Show: KenFM
- Country: Germany
- Website: kenfm.de

Ken Jebsen is the stage name of Kayvan Soufi-Siavash (Persian: کیوان صوفی‌سیاوش; born in 1966), a German-Iranian social media influencer, political activist and former radio host, who is most notable for his conspiracist views.

Jebsen rose to prominence as moderator of his show KenFM with the public broadcaster Rundfunk Berlin-Brandenburg (RBB). After an email with antisemitic remarks by him became public in 2011, he was fired for violating RBB's journalistic standards. Jebsen subsequently launched his own web-portal KenFM and an eponymous YouTube channel. There he mainly published "alternative views" and conspiracy theories, such as about the 9/11 attack and the COVID-19 pandemic. YouTube closed his account permanently on 22 January 2021 for repeated publications of COVID-19 misinformation despite warnings and previous blocks.

Zeit Online described Ken Jebsen as "probably the best known German conspiracy ideologue".

== TV and radio show presenter ==
=== First assignments ===
Ken Jebsen volunteered from 1987 to 1991 under the pseudonym Keks for the private broadcaster Radio Neufunkland in the city of Reutlingen, followed by a job as a reporter at Deutsche Welle TV, where he attracted attention for his spontaneous attitude and his feature banana microphone. In 1994 he became the presenter for a weekly late-night-show at the ZDF, a premier public-service TV broadcaster. Again a reporter, he worked for the Radio 4U show of the largest local Berlin broadcaster SFB. Around this time he landed his first assignment in the morning show team, the Radiofritzen at Radio Fritz, a public radio station. His last brief seasonal tenure took place in 1999 as he joined the team of hosts of the current morning show of ProSieben, a major private TV network.

=== Radio Fritz and dismissal ===
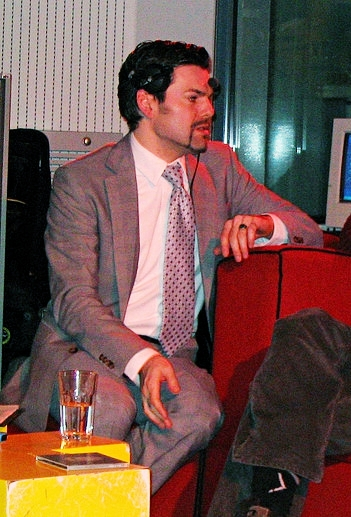
Jebsen at the Radio Fritz studio in 2005

From 2001 until 2011 Ken Jebsen served as the host of the popular radio show KenFM at Radio Fritz of the public broadcaster Rundfunk Berlin-Brandenburg (RBB).

In 2007, Ken Jebsen and Susanne Wündisch won the European CIVIS Radio Prize, awarded in the category Short Programme for their work Irgendwo dazwischen: Portrait of a Young Kurdish Woman in Berlin, broadcast on 16 March 2006 by RBB. The film depicts a young Kurdish teacher and choreographer, born and raised in Berlin, performing the daring and delicate balancing act of living in between both her traditional Islamic culture and the modern western lifestyle.

In early November 2011, an email of Ken Jebsen was published by author Henryk M. Broder, who criticized it for containing antisemitic statements. In the email, Jebsen states among other remarks that he knows "who invented the Holocaust as a PR stunt", he insinuates a connection between Joseph Goebbels, PR-pioneer Edward Bernays, the CIA as well as rich "Jews" such as Henry Kissinger. RBB initially defended Jebsen against the allegation and on 9 November it was decided to carry on with Ken Jebsen, who was instructed to "sensibly check future political issues". However, on 23 November 2011 RBB suspended his show and he was eventually dismissed, after it had been surmised that he had violated the broadcaster's journalistic standards on a number of occasions. Although he did not deny having written the email, Jebsen has repeatedly dismissed any allegations of antisemitism as "absurd."

== Internet portal ==
In spring 2012 Jebsen launched his own internet portal named KenFM, which is funded entirely through donations.

KenFM mainly publishes "alternative viewpoints" on contemporary issues and news. The portal is mostly known for publishing a wide range of conspiracy theories. This includes conspiracy theories about the 9/11 attack, the Bill & Melinda Gates Foundation or the COVID-19 pandemic.

== Criticism ==
Ken Jebsen and the KenFM outlet are regularly subjected to harsh criticism. During his early days after the dismissal from RBB, he was defended by some commenters. For example, some authors like Evelyn Hecht-Galinski argued that criticism has "gone beyond all measures" with respect to the fact that the wider debate on the Holocaust, antisemitism and related subjects requires restraint and a high degree of decency in Germany. However, with KenFM mainly publishing disproved conspiracy theories, mainstream media warns of the danger of his disinformation spreading, especially in the light of serious topics such as the COVID-19 pandemic.

Since 2014 Ken Jebsen has been a keynote speaker at the Vigils for Peace events (German: Mahnwachen für den Frieden). The Vigils for Peace have been criticized for being a gathering place of right-wing populists, nationalists, conspiracy theorists, and anti-semites.

In 2017 Ken Jebsen received the Cologne Charlemagne Prize awarded by the "Neue Rheinische Zeitung" blog for dedicated engagement in literature and journalism. A public award event at the Berlin Babylon Theater planned for 14 December 2017 was cancelled upon political protests, that effected an intervention of the city's Culture department.

== Personal life ==
Ken Jebsen was born in 1966 in Krefeld Hüls as Kayvan Soufi-Siavash to a German mother from Hamburg and an Iranian father. As his birth name was too difficult to understand and to pronounce for the majority of the German radio audience, he decided to adopt the stage name Ken Jebsen. The surname supposedly echoes his mothers maiden name.

However, according to his own biographical account at Radio Fritz, his birth name was Moustafa Kashefi and he was born on board of a commercial jetliner while traversing Iranian airspace. In a detailed interview with Mathias Bröckers, Jebsen refuted his self-made "absurde Bio" ("absurd bio") and dismissed it as an easily recognizable "Gag" ("gag").

Ken Jebsen has three children and lives in Berlin.

== Awards ==
- 2007: Europäischer Civis Hörfunkpreis in the category kurze Programme bis 6 Minuten together with Susanne Wündisch for Irgendwo dazwischen, rbb
