= KenFM =

German internet journalism outlet

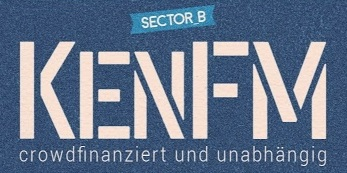
- Website type: Journalism portal
- Available in: German, English, French, Russian, Dutch, Italian, Portuguese, Spanish
- Owner: Ken Jebsen
- Website: kenfm.de (not any longer available)
- Commercial: Yes
- Registration: Optional
- Launched: 2011
- Current status: Active

KenFM was a German internet journalism portal, established in 2011 by German television and radio presenter Ken Jebsen. It is the successor of a former eponymous radio show, which had over the course of ten years been hosted by Ken Jebsen, aired from 2001 to 2011 on the youth channel Radio Fritz of Rundfunk Berlin-Brandenburg (RBB). Despite its popularity the show abruptly came to an end, because of Ken's surmised repeatedly violating the journalistic standards of RBB. According to the RBB Ken Jebsen had "repeatedly disregarded binding agreements", consequently co-operation was ended on 23 November 2011 and the program was discontinued permanently.

Since the program's relaunch on a freelance basis as web portal and YouTube channel in spring 2012, KenFM has been producing news reports, interviews, talk-shows, political comments and analyses on a regular basis. The portal is mainly known for publishing "alternative views" and conspiracy theories, such as about the 9/11 attack and the Coronavirus pandemic.

== History ==
=== Radio Fritz ===
On Saturday 28 April 2001 KenFM aired for the first time from a fashion boutique in Berlin as the show changed its place several times over the course of the following years. Further noticeable publication stations are the Peugeot Avenue (Unter den Linden, Berlin-Mitte), Mini-Berlin (Friedrichstrasse, Berlin-Mitte) and the Sony Center (Potsdamer Platz, Berlin-Tiergarten).

The show soon received widespread acclaim by critics for its unconventional style "dedicated to intelligent madness and playing with the twisted spoken word". In an article in March 2004 titled "Neuroscience instead of Quiz Show" the TAZ newspaper, disillusioned with the "...particularly pathetic example of German Radio programming", highlights the contrasts and portrays the audience's approval of its authenticity - "four hours live, no rehearsal [...] a game based on science, history, philosophy and the arts. Brain research and nuclear physics instead of Super Contest and senseless advertising".

Eventually KenFM broadcast every Sunday afternoon from Fritz Studios in Potsdam-Babelsberg. In addition to occasional live shows in the field, recordings of events that did not fit in the four hour live air-time or did not take place on Sundays were separately published. Excerpts of the show were offered as podcast since January 2006. Since March 2006 the KenFM podcast also offered the Fritz.de playlist. Concerts and musical performances were recorded and filmed and a video of the appearance produced plus interviews with bands or band members and published at FritzTV on Fritz.de the following days and a YouTube channel labeled KenFM2008 was established.

=== Deposition ===
In early November 2011 an email of Ken Jebsen was published by author Henryk M. Broder, who criticized it for containing anti-Semitic statements. In the email Jebsen states among other remarks that he knows "who invented the Holocaust as a PR stunt", he insinuates a connection between Joseph Goebbels, PR-pioneer Edward Bernays, the CIA as well as rich "Jews" such as Henry Kissinger. RBB initially defended Jebsen against the allegation and on 9 November it was decided to carry on with Ken Jebsen, who was instructed to "sensibly check future political issues". However, on 23 November 2011 RBB suspended his show and he was eventually dismissed after it had been surmised, that he had violated the broadcaster's journalistic standards on a number of occasions. Although he did not deny having written the email, Jebsen has repeatedly dismissed any allegations of Antisemitism as absurd.

=== KenFM as an internet portal ===
The first 90-minute program was published on Sunday 1 April 2012 at 14:00, based on the former radio show format and initially designated as "CamFM", produced in audio and video and presented free of charge on various video portals. Known RBB features and broadcast components were taken over, continued and further developed. In addition, audio publications on current topics are being irregularly published since. KenFM is funded exclusively by viewer's donations.

KenFM mainly publishes "alternative viewpoints" on contemporary issues and news. The portal is mostly known for publishing a wide range of conspiracy theories. This includes conspiracy theories about the 9/11 attack, the Bill & Melinda Gates Foundation or the COVID-19 pandemic.

== Criticism ==
Ken Jebsen and the KenFM outlet were regularly subjected to harsh criticism. During his early days after the dismissal from the RBB, he was defended by some commenters. For example, some authors like Evelyn Hecht-Galinski argued that criticism on Jebsen had "gone beyond all measures" with respect to the fact that the wider debate on the Holocaust, antisemitism and related subjects requires restraint and a high degree of decency in Germany. However, with KenFM mainly publishing disproved conspiracy theories, mainstream media warned of the danger of his disinformation spreading, especially in the light of serious topics such as the COVID-19 pandemic.

Political scientist Markus Linden labeled Ken Jebsen, who he said preaches anti-Americanism under the name KenFM. He argued that KenFM is characterized by "sermonic monologues or long interviews with alternative war reporters, apostates, or marginal politicians and conspiracy theorists." Wolfgang Storz, former chief editor of the Frankfurter Rundschau used the term "political-journalistic Querfront network (politisch-publizistisches Querfront-Netzwerk)" in a controversial analysis for the Otto Brenner Foundation, a foundation for promotion of scientific research and knowledge. Storz identified KenFM as to be one of the protagonists "of persons and organisations who form a political-journalistic Querfront network, in which traditional Left-Right wing categories do no longer apply. The network's most striking feature is its activism against the elite", the government and the associated media (Systemmedien).

== See also ==
- Alternative media
- Historikerstreit
