= Deschooling =

Transition from the school system to homeschooling

Deschooling is a term invented by Austrian philosopher Ivan Illich. The word is mainly used by homeschoolers, especially unschoolers, to refer to the transition process that children and parents go through when they leave the school system in order to start homeschooling. The process is a crucial basis for homeschooling to work. It involves children gradually transitioning away from their schoolday routine and institutional mentality, redeveloping the ability to learn via self-determination, and discovering what they want to learn in their first homeschool days.

== Process ==
The amount of time this process takes can vary, depending on the type of person the child is and how much time they spent in the school system. The process may affect the behavior of different children differently. Especially in the first days of deschooling, it is often the case that children mainly want to recover from the school surroundings and therefore will generally sleep very long and refuse any kind of intentional learning and instead search for substitute satisfactions like watching TV or playing video games, very similar to the behavior during early school holidays. Further in this transition process, children may feel bored or may miss the daily structure, until they eventually find out how to make use of their time and freedom to find interests. In the best case this results in them voluntarily informing themselves about certain things they are interested in, whereupon homeschooling can start.

This step is often considered a recreation stage or a process of "healing" from the school environment. Many followers of the modern homeschool movement consider this step necessary because they find that the school system can damage a child's innate creativity, curiosity, and willingness to learn. They claim that in school most children only study under unnatural extrinsic pressure like grades, instead of for themselves, and that what, when, how, and with whom to learn is always predetermined instead of self-determinable there.

== Background ==
Deschooling is credited to Ivan Illich, who felt that the traditional schooling children received needed to be reconstructed. Illich believed that schools contain a "hidden curriculum" that causes learning to align with grades and accreditation rather than with important skills. He believed that modern schooling is focused on growing schools as an industrialized system, a toxic industry that specializes in what families should be capable of forming themselves, namely education. According to Illich, schools align success on paper with academic excellence. As a result schools, grades, and diplomas give false assurances that the students have become knowledgeable in a certain educational concept.

John Holt was an educator who also believed in deschooling. His thoughts were closely aligned with Illich because neither was convinced that school was where students learned everything they needed to know. Instead, they emphasized that students learn consistently through other means, such as exposure to the natural world. Illich and Holt saw schools as being insufficient because of their focus on "skill drill" instead of other methods of learning. Additionally, theorists of deschooling saw education as maintaining the social order. Therefore, they wanted to "denounce the monopoly that traditional education institutions held on education and learning."

== Unschooling/deschooling society ==
"Deschooling" a person does not mean prohibiting people from learning or studying in schools. In Illich and Holt's unschooled society everybody would have the choice of whether they attend school. Rather than being forced to go to school, taking a test before entering a school, or being denied the opportunity to learn a desired topic, people would be free to choose how they learn. According to John Holt, an advocate for unschooling, "a deschooled society would be a society in which everyone shall have the widest and freest possible choice to learn whatever he wants to learn, whether in school or in some altogether different way."

== See also ==
- Deschooling Society
- Anti-schooling activism
