= Deschooling Society =

1971 book by Ivan Illich

- Author: Ivan Illich
- Language: English
- Subject: Education
- Publisher: Harper & Row
- Publication date: 1972
- Publication place: United States
- Media type: Print
- Pages: 116

Deschooling Society is a 1971 book written by Austrian priest Ivan Illich that critiques the role and practice of education in the modern world.

== Summary ==
Deschooling Society begins as a polemical work that then proposes suggestions for changes to education in society and learning in individual lifetimes. For example, he calls for the use of advanced technology to support "learning webs", which incorporate "peer-matching networks", where descriptions of a person's activities and skills are mutually exchanged for the education that they would benefit from. Illich argued that, with an egalitarian use of technology and a recognition of what technological progress allows, it would be warranted to create decentralized webs that would support the goal of a truly equal educational system:

A good educational system should have three purposes: it should provide all who want to learn with access to available resources at any time in their lives; empower all who want to share what they know to find those who want to learn it from them; and, finally, furnish all who want to present an issue to the public with the opportunity to make their challenge known.

Illich proposes a system of self-directed education in fluid and informal arrangements, which he describes as "educational webs which heighten the opportunity for each one to transform each moment of his living into one of learning, sharing, and caring."

Furthermore, he states:

Universal education through schooling is not feasible. It would be no more feasible if it were attempted by means of alternative institutions built on the style of present schools. Neither new attitudes of teachers toward their pupils nor the proliferation of educational hardware or software (in classroom or bedroom), nor finally the attempt to expand the pedagogue's responsibility until it engulfs his pupils' lifetimes will deliver universal education. The current search for new educational funnels must be reversed into the search for their institutional inverse: educational webs which heighten the opportunity for each one to transform each moment of his living into one of learning, sharing, and caring. We hope to contribute concepts needed by those who conduct such counterfoil research on education—and also to those who seek alternatives to other established service industries.

The final sentence, above, clarifies Illich's view that education's institutionalisation fosters society's institutionalisation, and so de-institutionalising education may help de-institutionalize society. Further, Illich suggests reinventing learning and expanding it throughout society and across persons' lifespans. Once again, most influential was his 1971 call for advanced technology to support "learning webs":

The operation of a peer-matching network would be simple. The user would identify himself by name and address and describe the activity for which he sought a peer. A computer would send him back the names and addresses of all those who had inserted the same description. It is amazing that such a simple utility has never been used on a broad scale for publicly valued activity.

According to a review in the Libertarian Forum, "Illich's advocacy of the free market in education is the bone in the throat that is choking the public educators." Yet, unlike libertarians, Illich opposes not merely publicly funded schooling, but schools as such. Thus, Illich's envisioned disestablishment of schools aimed not to establish a free market in educational services, but to attain a fundamental shift: a deschooled society. In his 1973 book After Deschooling, What?, he asserted, "We can disestablish schools, or we can deschool culture." In fact, he called advocates of free-market education "the most dangerous category of educational reformers."

=== Learning Networks ===
Developing this idea, Illich proposes four Learning Networks:

1. Reference Service to Educational Objects - An open directory of educational resources and their availability to learners.
2. Skills Exchange - A database of people willing to list their skills and the basis on which they would be prepared to share or swap them with others.
3. Peer-Matching - A network helping people to communicate their learning activities and aims in order to find similar learners who may wish to collaborate.
4. Directory of Professional Educators - A list of professionals, paraprofessionals and free-lancers detailing their qualifications, services and the terms on which these are made available.

== See also ==
- Life-long learning – Ongoing, voluntary, and self-motivated pursuit of knowledge
- Unschooling – Form of homeschooling
