= John Holt (American educator) =

American writer and educator (1923–1985)

- Holt in 1980
- Born: John Caldwell Holt; April 14, 1923; New York City, U.S.
- Died: September 14, 1985 (aged 62); Boston, Massachusetts, U.S.
- Occupations: Author; Educator
- Notable work: Escape from Childhood; How Children Learn; How Children Fail

John Caldwell Holt (April 14, 1923 – September 14, 1985) was an American author and educator, a proponent of homeschooling (specifically the unschooling approach), and a pioneer in youth rights theory.

After a six-year stint teaching elementary school in the 1950s, Holt wrote the book How Children Fail (1964), which cataloged the problems he saw with the American school system. He followed it up with How Children Learn (1967). Both books were popular, and they started Holt's career as a consultant to American schools. By the 1970s he decided he would try reforming the school system and began to advocate homeschooling and, later, the form of homeschooling known as unschooling. He wrote a total of 11 books on the subject of schooling as well as starting the newsletter Growing Without Schooling (GWS).

== Early life ==
Holt was born on April 14, 1923, in New York City; he had two younger sisters. He attended Phillips Exeter Academy, then attended Yale University, graduating in 1943 with a degree in Industrial Engineering. Directly after graduating he enlisted with the United States Navy, and served in World War II on the submarine USS Barbero. He was discharged in 1946, then joined the United World Federalists, an organization that promoted world peace through the formation of a single world government. He rose up the ranks of the organization, and served as the executive director of the group's New York State chapter when he left in 1952 due to frustration with the organization's lack of progress.

== Teaching career ==
Holt's sister encouraged him to become an elementary school teacher, and in 1953 he began teaching at the newly-formed Colorado Rocky Mountain School, a private school in Carbondale, Colorado. In 1957 and 1958 he taught at the Shady Hill School, a private elementary and middle school in Cambridge, Massachusetts. In 1959 he taught fifth grade at the Lesley Ellis School, also in Cambridge.

While teaching, Holt came to the belief that the students in his classroom, despite often being intelligent and from wealthy backgrounds, were more timid and unsure than the infant and toddler children of his sisters and friends.

Holt became disillusioned with the school system after several years of working within it; he became convinced that reform of the school system was not possible and began to advocate homeschooling. He believed that "children who were provided with a rich and stimulating learning environment would learn what they are ready to learn, when they are ready to learn it". Holt believed that children did not need to be coerced into learning; they would do so naturally if given the freedom to follow their own interests and a rich assortment of resources. This line of thought came to be called unschooling.

Holt's Growing Without Schooling newsletter, founded in 1977, was America's first home education newsletter. He also set up John Holt's Bookstore, which made selected books available by mail order. This brought in additional revenue that helped sustain the newsletter, which carried very little advertising.

Holt wrote several books that have greatly influenced the unschooling movement. His writings have influenced many individuals and organizations, including the Evergreen State College, Caleb Gattegno, Americans for a Society Free from Age Restrictions, the National Youth Rights Association, and the Freechild Project.

Holt did not have a teaching degree, which many believe allowed for his work in the private school sector to make way for him to have a more objective opinion on the American school system. Being new to the environment, it is thought that he was able to make more objective distinctions than other educators as to what the schools said they were doing and what they were actually doing. For the first many years of his teaching career, he maintained the belief that schools overall were not meeting their missions due to using the wrong methods and pedagogical approaches, and that these failures were the cause for rendering young scholars as children who were less willing to learn and more focused on avoiding the embarrassment and ridicule of not learning.

== Writing career ==
=== How Children Fail (1964) ===
As Holt wrote in his first book, How Children Fail (1964) "...after all, if they (meaning us) know that you can't do anything, then they won't blame you or punish you for not being able to do what you have been told to do." This notion led him to make changes within his own classroom to provide an environment in which his students would feel more comfortable and confident. With the support of his colleague Bill Hull, Holt began putting less emphasis on grades and tests, and began taking steps to decrease the notion of ranking the children. He focused on his students being able to grasp concepts, rather than having them work for the correct answer. Instead of using the typical methods to determine students' progress, he adopted a more student-centered approach. Patrick Farenga paraphrased Holt's distinction between good and bad students: "a good student is careful not to forget what he studied until after the test is taken." Eventually, his new methods for teaching caused him to be terminated from his position, which he claimed was due to the school wanting to maintain "old 'new' ideas not new 'new' ideas."

=== How Children Learn (1967) ===
After leaving Colorado, Holt sought other opportunities in education. Although it took him some time to come to a conclusion about his own thoughts on education as well as make sense of his observations, studies, and data, ultimately he felt that schools were "a place where children learn to be stupid." Once he developed this conclusion, his focus shifted to making suggestions to help teachers and parents capable of teaching their children how to learn, thus prompting his second book, How Children Learn, in 1967. Despite his successful career, he still met rejections, resentment, and false hopes from colleagues and school systems surrounding his ideas and methods. This reality pushed him further and further into the idea of deschooling.

=== The Underachieving School (1969), What Do I Do Monday? (1970) ===
After a few more years of teaching and some visiting professor positions at area universities, Holt wrote his next two books, The Underachieving School (1969) and What Do I Do Monday? (1970). Both books focused on his belief that schools weren't working and ideas about how they could be better. Holt had determined by this time that the changes he would like to see happen in the school systems were not likely to become a reality. These changes included the relationship between children and the teachers and school community.

=== Freedom and Beyond (1972) ===
At this point in the history of education, the free school movement was in full swing, and his next book, Freedom and Beyond (1972), questioned much of what teachers and educators really meant when they suggested children should have more freedom in the classroom. While Holt was an advocate of children having more rights and abilities to make decisions for themselves, he felt that the free school movement was not the answer to the question of how to fix the school system.

=== Escape from Childhood (1974) ===
Holt then wrote Escape from Childhood: The Needs and Rights of Children (1974), in which he claimed that children should have independence including the right to work for money, receive fair and equal treatment, the right to vote and the right to choose new parents. The book effectively argued that children, "regardless of age", should have all the rights that an adult can enjoy. In the final chapter, he wrote that "all people, including young people, should have the right to control their own private sex lives and acts". At the time, his notions of children having so many rights and responsibilities was not very popular, but since then the court systems have seen more and more cases of children attempting to realise many of Holt's suggestions, such as choosing their legal guardian.

=== Instead of Education (1976) ===
Although many of Holt's previous works had discussed the needed reform and failure of the traditional school system, his seventh book, Instead of Education: Ways to Help People do Better (1976), focused more on his encouragement that parents find legal ways to remove their children from compulsory schools. Specifically, he referred to an Underground Railroad in which schoolchildren could escape the failing school systems of which he had been so critical. The book caused a number of parents to reach out to him regarding their own homeschooling of their children. This correspondence grew so much that he decided to start a newsletter for homeschooling parents. In 1977 Growing Without Schooling was developed and distributed. It is thought that this newsletter is the first published periodical regarding homeschooling in the United States.

=== Never Too Late (1978) ===
Holt's focus began to switch from critiquing school systems and writing from afar to speaking engagements and educating adults on how they can teach their children while learning themselves. His next book, Never Too Late: My Musical Autobiography (1978), focused on showing adults that they were not too old to learn new things. This was translated into ways in which parents who had no experience in education could learn to teach their children on their own in a homeschooling setting.

=== Teach Your Own (1981) ===
In 1981, the first edition of Holt's most noteworthy book on unschooling, Teach Your Own: The John Holt Manual on Homeschooling, was published. This book, as noted in the first lines of the introduction, is "about ways we can teach children, or rather, allow them to learn, outside of schools—at home, or in whatever other places and situations (and the more the better) we can make available to them. It is in part an argument in favor of doing it, in part a report of the people who are doing it, and in part a manual of action for people who want to do it." This manual has since been revised by Holt follower and homeschooling parent Patrick Farenga, and is still distributed today.

=== Death and Learning All the Time (1989) ===
Even after his death in 1985, Holt's influence on homeschooling continued through his work. His final book, Learning All the Time: How Small Children Begin to Read, Write, Count and Investigate the World, Without Being Taught, was published posthumously in 1989. It contained a number of his writings for Growing Without Schooling. The GWS' newsletter has since garnered followings in a number of different countries and has been continuously distributed since its inception as a tool for the promotion and encouragement of homeschooling in light of the lack of school system reform.

== Bibliography ==
- — (1995) [1964]. How Children Fail. Reading, Mass: Da Capo Lifelong Books. ISBN 978-0-201-48402-1.
- — (2017) [1967]. How Children Learn. New York, NY: Da Capo Lifelong Books. ISBN 978-0-7382-2008-6.
- — (2005) [1969]. The Underachieving School. New York: Sentient Publications. ISBN 978-1-59181-038-4.
- — (1970). What Do I Do Monday?. Dutton Adult. ISBN 978-0-525-23140-0.
- — (1995) [1972]. Freedom and Beyond. Boynton/Cook. ISBN 978-0-86709-367-4.
- — (2013) [1974]. Escape From Childhood. Holt LLC. ISBN 978-0-9854002-9-3.
- — (2003) [1976]. Instead of Education: Ways to Help People do Better. Sentient Publications. ISBN 978-1-59181-009-4.
- — (1991) [1979]. Never Too Late: My Musical Life Story. Reading, Mass: Da Capo Press. ISBN 978-0-201-56763-2.
- —; Farenga, Pat (2021) [1981]. Teach Your Own: The Indispensable Guide to Living and Learning with Children at Home. Hachette GO. ISBN 978-0-306-92621-1.
- — (1990) [1989]. Learning All The Time. Reading, Mass.: Da Capo Lifelong Books. ISBN 978-0-201-55091-7.
- — (1990). A Life Worth Living: Selected Letters of John Holt. Columbus: Columbus, Ohio : Ohio State University Press. ISBN 978-0-8142-0544-0.

== See also ==
- Deschooling
- John Taylor Gatto
- Jonathan Kozol
- Grace Llewellyn
- History of youth rights in the United States
- Unschooling
