= Unschooling =

Form of homeschooling

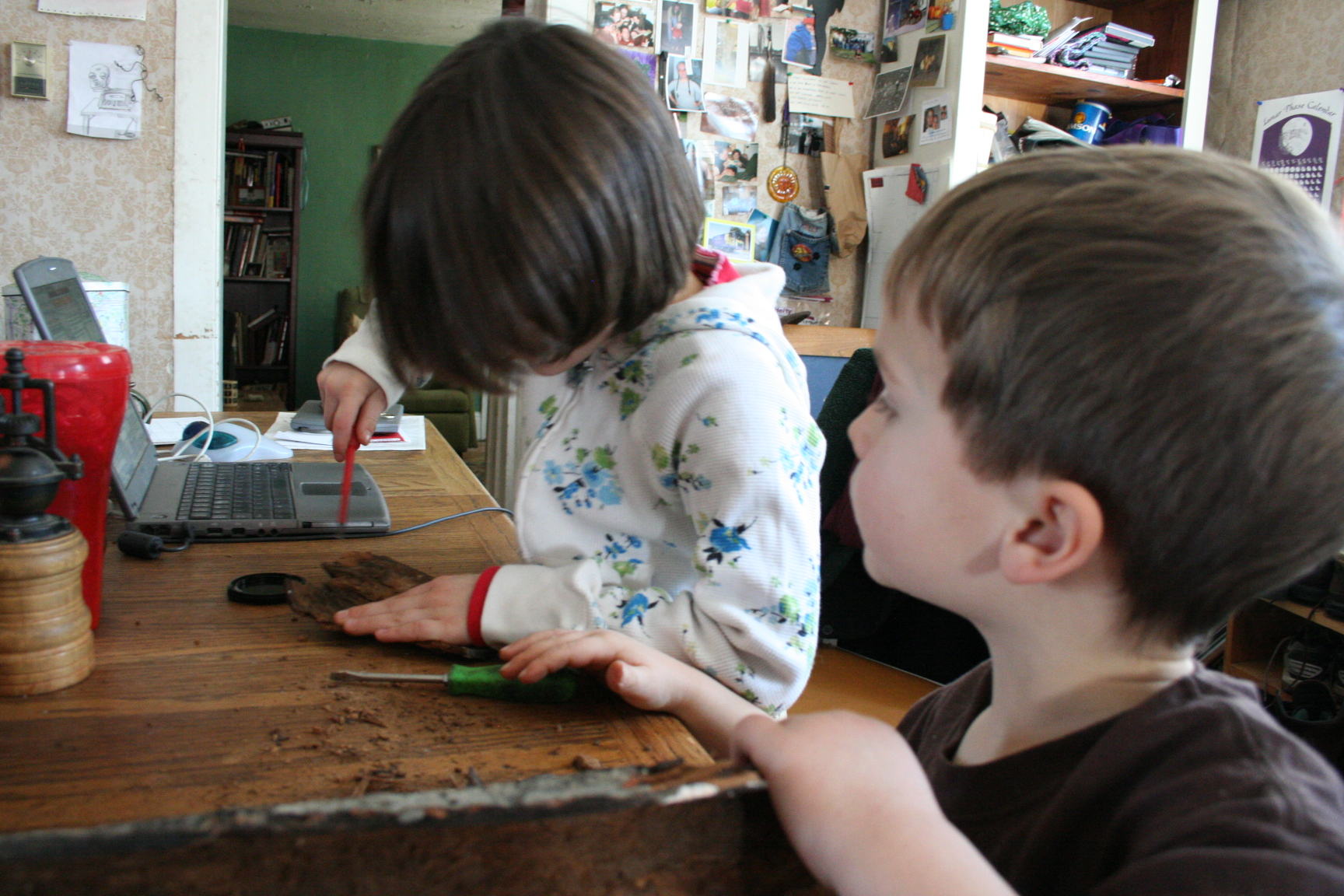
Children investigating insect deposits in tree bark as part of an unschooling activity

Unschooling is a practice of self-driven informal learning characterized by a lesson-free and curriculum-free implementation of homeschooling. Unschooling encourages exploration of activities initiated by the children themselves, under the belief that the more personal learning is, the more meaningful, well-understood, and therefore useful it is to the child.

The term unschooling was coined in the 1970s and used by educator John Holt, who is widely regarded as the father of unschooling. Unschooling is often seen as a subset of homeschooling, the key difference lying in the use of an external or individual curriculum. Homeschooling, in its many variations, has been the subject of public debate.

Critics of unschooling express concerns that unschooled children will be neglected by parents who may not be capable of sustaining a proper educational environment, and the child might lack the social skills, structure, discipline, and motivation of their schooled peers. Critics also worry that unschooled children will be unable to cope with uncomfortable or challenging situations. Some studies suggest that children who have participated in unschooling may experience academic underdevelopment. Proponents of unschooling assert that self-directed education in a non-academic, often natural and diversified environment is a far more efficient, sustainable, and child-friendly form of education than traditional schooling, as it preserves innate curiosity, pleasure, and willingness to discover and learn new things.

== History ==
The term unschooling probably derives from Ivan Illich's term deschooling. It was popularized through John Holt's newsletter Growing Without Schooling (GWS). Holt is also widely regarded as the father of unschooling. In an early essay, Holt contrasted the two terms:

GWS will say "unschooling" when we mean taking children out of school, and "deschooling" when we mean changing the laws to make schools non-compulsory...

At the time, the term was equivalent to home schooling. Subsequently, home-schoolers began to differentiate between various educational philosophies within home schooling. The term unschooling became used to contrast versions of home schooling that were perceived as politically and pedagogically "school-like," in that they used textbooks and exercises at home in the same way they would be used at school.

In 2003, in Holt's book Teach Your Own (originally published in 1981), Pat Farenga, co-author of the new edition, provided a definition:

When pressed, I define unschooling as allowing children as much freedom to learn in the world as their parents can comfortably bear. It allows children to develop knowledge and skills based on their own personal passions and life situations.

In the same passage Holt stated that he was not entirely comfortable with this term, and would have preferred the term living. Holt's use of the term emphasizes learning as a natural process, integrated into the spaces and activities of everyday life, and not benefiting from adult manipulation. It follows closely on the themes of educational philosophies proposed by Jean-Jacques Rousseau, Jiddu Krishnamurti, Paul Goodman, and A.S. Neill.

After Holt's death a range of unschooling practitioners and observers defined the term in various ways. For instance, the Freechild Project defines unschooling as:

[T]he process of learning through life, without formalized or institutionalized classrooms or schoolwork.

American homeschooling parent Sandra Dodd proposed the term radical unschooling to emphasize the complete rejection of any distinction between educational and non-educational activities. Radical unschooling emphasizes that unschooling is a non-coercive, cooperative practice, and seeks to promote those values in all areas of life. These philosophies share an opposition to traditional schooling techniques and the social structure of schools. Most emphasize the integration of learning into the everyday life of the family and wider community. Scholars disagree on whether unschooling is primarily defined by learner initiative. Peter Gray suggested the term self-directed education, which has fewer negative connotations.

== Motivations ==
Parents choose to unschool their children for a variety of reasons, many of which overlap with reasons for homeschooling.

Unschoolers criticize schools for lessening the parent–child bond, reducing family time, and for creating atmospheres that are fearful. Some unschoolers argue that schools teach children facts and skills that will not be useful to them, whereas, with unschooling, children learn how to learn, which is of more enduring use. Some assert that schools teach children only how to follow instructions, which does not prepare them to confront novel tasks. Another argument is that the structure of school is not suitable for people who want to make their own decisions about what, when, how, and with whom they learn because many things are predetermined in the school setting, while unschooled students are more free to make such decisions.

In school, a student's community may consist mainly of a peer group, that the parent has little influence over or even knowledge of. Unschoolers may have more opportunity to share a role in their community—including with older and younger people—and can therefore learn to find their place within more diverse groups of people. Parents of school children also have little say regarding instructors and teachers, whereas parents of unschoolers may be more involved in the selection of the coaches or mentors their children work and build relationships with.

According to unschooling pioneer John Holt, child-led learning is more efficient and respectful of children's time, takes advantage of their interests, and allows deeper exploration of subjects than what is possible in conventional education.

...the anxiety children feel at constantly being tested, their fear of failure, punishment, and disgrace, severely reduces their ability both to perceive and to remember, and drives them away from the material being studied into strategies for fooling teachers into thinking they know what they really don't know.

Some schools have adopted relatively non-coercive and cooperative techniques in a manner that harmonizes with the philosophies behind unschooling. For example, Sudbury model schools are non-coercive, non-indoctrinative, cooperative, democratically run partnerships between children and adults—including full partnership with parents—in which learning is individualized and child-led, in a way that complements home education.

Concerns about socialization can also be a factor in the decision to unschool. Some unschoolers believe that conditions in conventional schools, such as age segregation, the ratio of children to adults, or the amount of time spent sitting and obeying orders of one authority figure, are not conducive to proper education.

Unschooling may broaden the range of people and environments to which a learner is exposed. Unschoolers may be more mature than their schooled peers on average, and some believe this is a result of the wide range of people they have the opportunity to interact with, although it may also be "difficult to find children [...] for, well, socialization". Opportunities for unschoolers to meet and interact with other unschoolers has increased in recent years, allowing unschoolers to have interactions with other children with similar experiences.

== Methods and philosophy ==
=== Natural learning ===
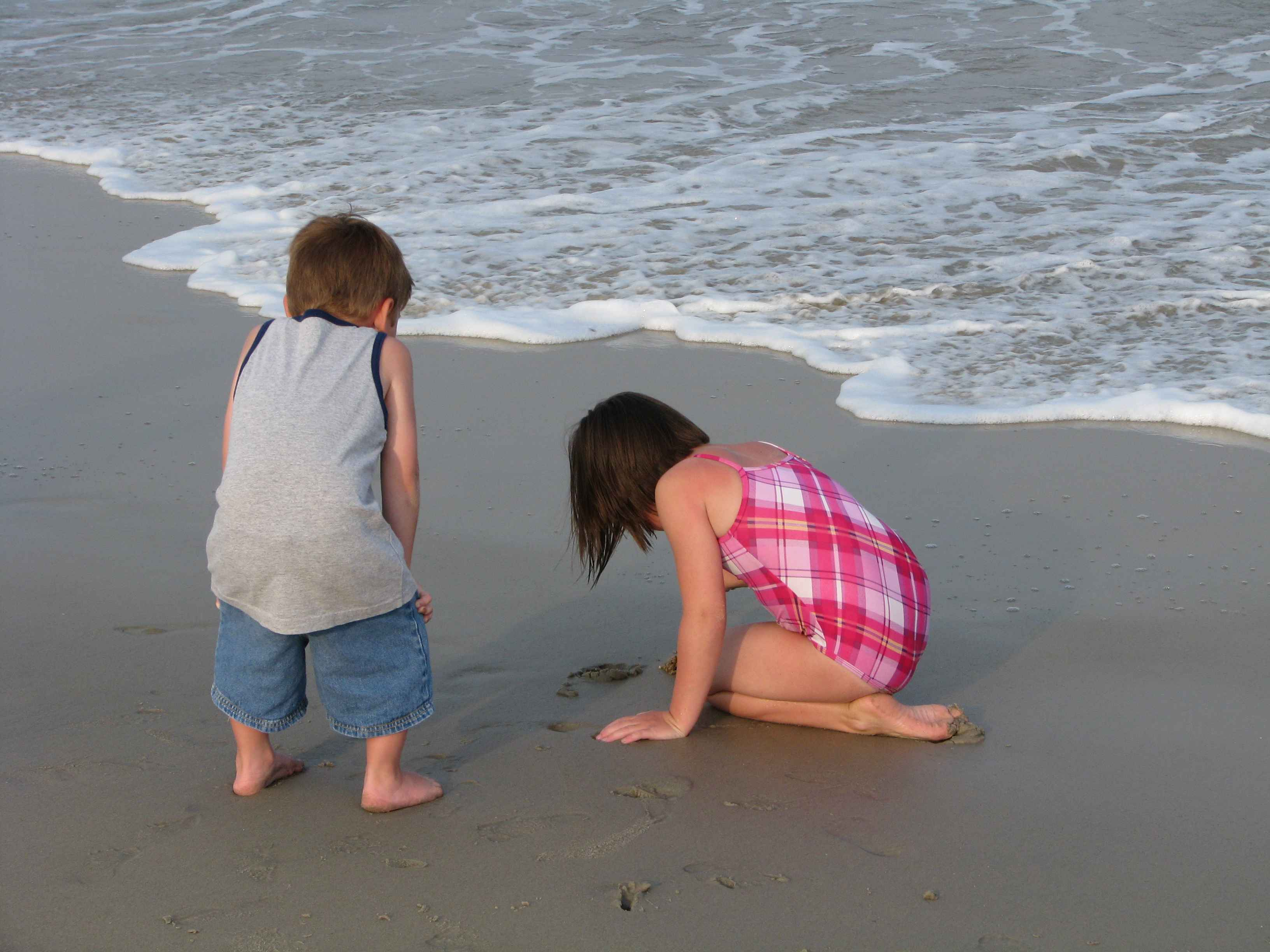
Unschooling may emphasize free, undirected play as a major component of children's education.

Unschooling is based on the premise that learning is an ongoing process driven by intrinsic curiosity. It posits that children have an inherent desire to learn, and suggests that standardized curricula and schedules may not always align with individual's development pace or interests. While advocates argue that conventional schooling can limit potential by requiring them to engage with specific subject matter in a uniform way, others believe that structured education can provide valuable support for diverse learning styles and needs.

=== Learning styles ===
Psychological research indicates children vary in the way they learn. In the United States, students in public schools take an average of 112 standardized tests during their K-12 edication. Unschooling practitioners generally favor qualitative observation over standardised testing, asserting this approach better adapts to individual cognitive development.

While the concept of "learning styles" remains a common framework for discussing educational preferences, a 2008 literature review found limited evidence that matching instruction to specific styles improves academic performance. Within traditional classroom settings, the ability to customize evaluation methods for individual students is often constrained by institutional requirements and group sizes.

==== Developmental differences ====
Developmental psychologists note that children reach cognitive milestones at different ages. Unschooling philosophy applies this observation to academic skills. Unschooling proponents believe that a uniform schedule may cause students to disengage if they have already mastered the topic or frustrate those not developmentally prepared for it. Research has indicated that natural learning methods can produce more significant changes in behavior or applied skills compared to traditional methods, though not necessarily a higher volume of information retention.

==== Music and Unschooling ====
Music education is widely available in American public schools, with approximately 97% of elementary schools offering music programs. Conventional music instruction typically emphasizes music literacy through sight-reading and the precise execution of written scores. In contrast, some unschooling families adopt methods such as "playing by ear" or the "Garage Band Theory," which prioritize the recognition of musical patterns and auditory learning. Unschooling parents believe it is a more effective way to learn music.

=== Essential body of knowledge ===
Some unschooling advocates argue that the process of "learning how to learn" takes precedence over the mastery of any specific academic subject.that learning how to learn is more important than mastering any specific subject. This perspective is based on the premise that future knowledge needs are unpredictable, and that fostering a lifelong interest in learning is more practical than a fixed curriculum. John Holt, a foundational figure in the movement, argued:

"If children are given access to enough of the world, they will see clearly enough what things are truly important to themselves and to others, and they will make for themselves a better path into that world than anyone else could make for them."

Many unschoolers reject the idea of a universal "essential body of knowledge," asserting that individuals can acquire new skills or revisit academic subjects as adults to meet emerging personal or professional goals.

=== The role of parents ===
While unschooling is learner-directed, it is generally not characterized as a "hands-off" approach. Parents typically act as facilitators by providing resources, guidance, and emotional support. This involvement often includes sharing literature, facilitating community connections—such as arranging meetings with mentors or specialists—and assisting children in setting and achieving self-identified goals. The level of parental intervention often decreases as children mature and become more adept at identifying resources and executing their own plans.

=== Paradigm shift ===
Advocates suggest that a paradigm shift in regards to education and child rearing is required before engaging with unschooling. Because the philosophy contradicts many cultural assumptions about structured learning, new practitioners are often encouraged to examine the unspoken beliefs they hold about schooling. This transition involves a shift in focus from the specific activities a child performs to the underlying motivations and reasons for those activities, prioritizing the "why" of learning over the "what."

== Compared with other homeschooling models ==
Unschooling is a form of homeschooling, which is the education of children at home or places other than in a school. Unschooling claims to teach children based on their interests rather than according to a set curriculum.

Unschooling contrasts with other forms of homeschooling in that the student's education is not directed by a teacher and curriculum, but by parents. Unschooling claims to build upon children's natural curiosity as an extension of their interests, concerns, needs, and goals.

== Branches ==
There are a variety of approaches to designing and practicing unschooling. Some of the most popular include:

- Worldschooling, in which families travel around the world and learn through experiencing other places, people, cultures, and activities typical for these locations.
- Project-based unschooling, which holds that students acquire a deeper knowledge through active exploration of real-world challenges, problems, and projects that they can do in their own way and at their own pace.
- Gameschooling, employs various games like board and card games to facilitate learning. In addition to developing skills in math, language, and history, board games also develop social skills such as interpersonal communication, negotiation, persuasion, diplomacy, and virtues like good sportsmanship.

== Other forms of alternative education ==
Many other forms of alternative education also prioritize student control of learning, albeit not necessarily by the individual learner. These include free democratic schools.

== Criticism ==
As a form of homeschooling, unschooling faces many of the same critiques as homeschooling. Criticisms of unschooling in particular tend to focus on whether students can receive sufficient education in a context with so little structure compared to standard schooling practices. Some critics maintain that it can be difficult to build sufficient motivation in students to allow them to learn without guardrails, and that some students might be left behind as a result, and that they might fare poorly compared with their peers.

Opponents of unschooling fear that children may be at the mercy of bad parents, like those who withdraw their children from school without taking on the role of "teacher." This leaves children directionless, which can affect them later in life if they have no practice expanding their curiosity and integrating into society.

In a 2006 study of children aged five to ten, unschooled children scored below traditionally schooled children in four of seven studied categories, and significantly below structured homeschoolers in all seven studied categories.

== Persons of interest ==
- Daniel Quinn, author/cultural critic

=== Adult unschoolers of note ===
- Billie Eilish, singer/songwriter
- Carsie Blanton, singer/songwriter

== See also ==
- Anti-schooling activism
- Alternative school
- Anarchistic free school
- Autodidacticism
- Democratic education
- Deschooling Society
- Gifted education
- Montessori method
- Not Back to School Camp, an annual gathering of over 100 unschoolers ages 13 to 18
- Reggio Emilia approach
- Special education
- Taking Children Seriously
- The Teenage Liberation Handbook: How to Quit School and Get a Real Life and Education
- Waldorf Education
