= Kornmarkt, Heidelberg =

Square in the Altstadt of Heidelberg

Coordinates: 49.4120°N 8.7115°E

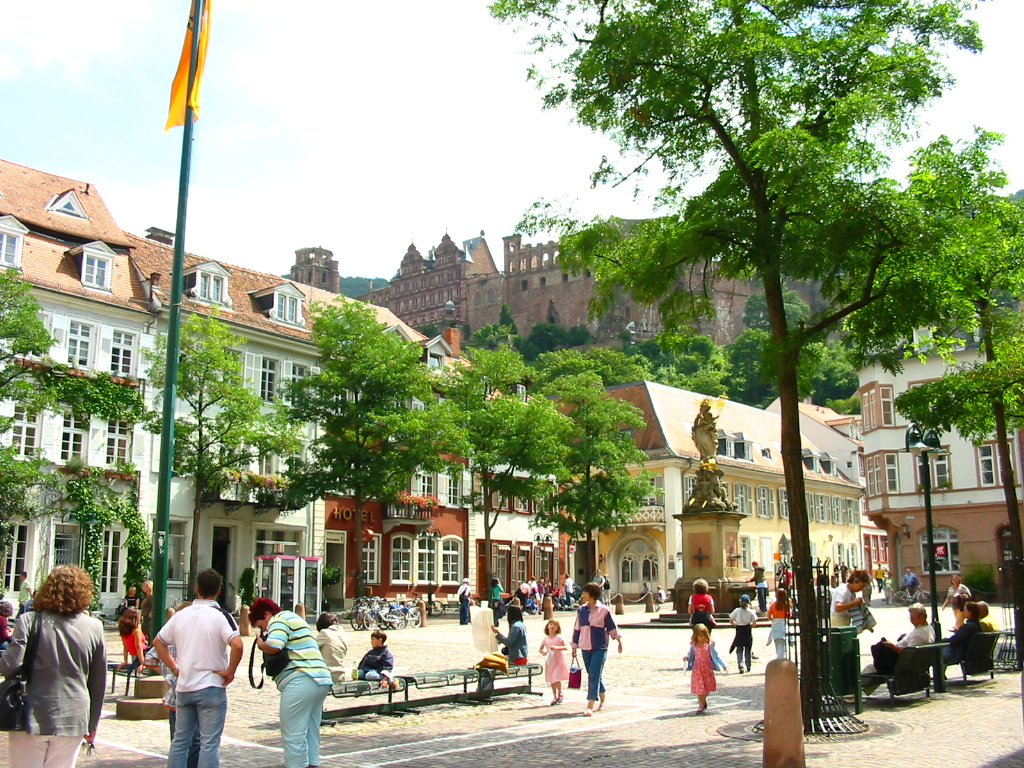
Kornmarkt

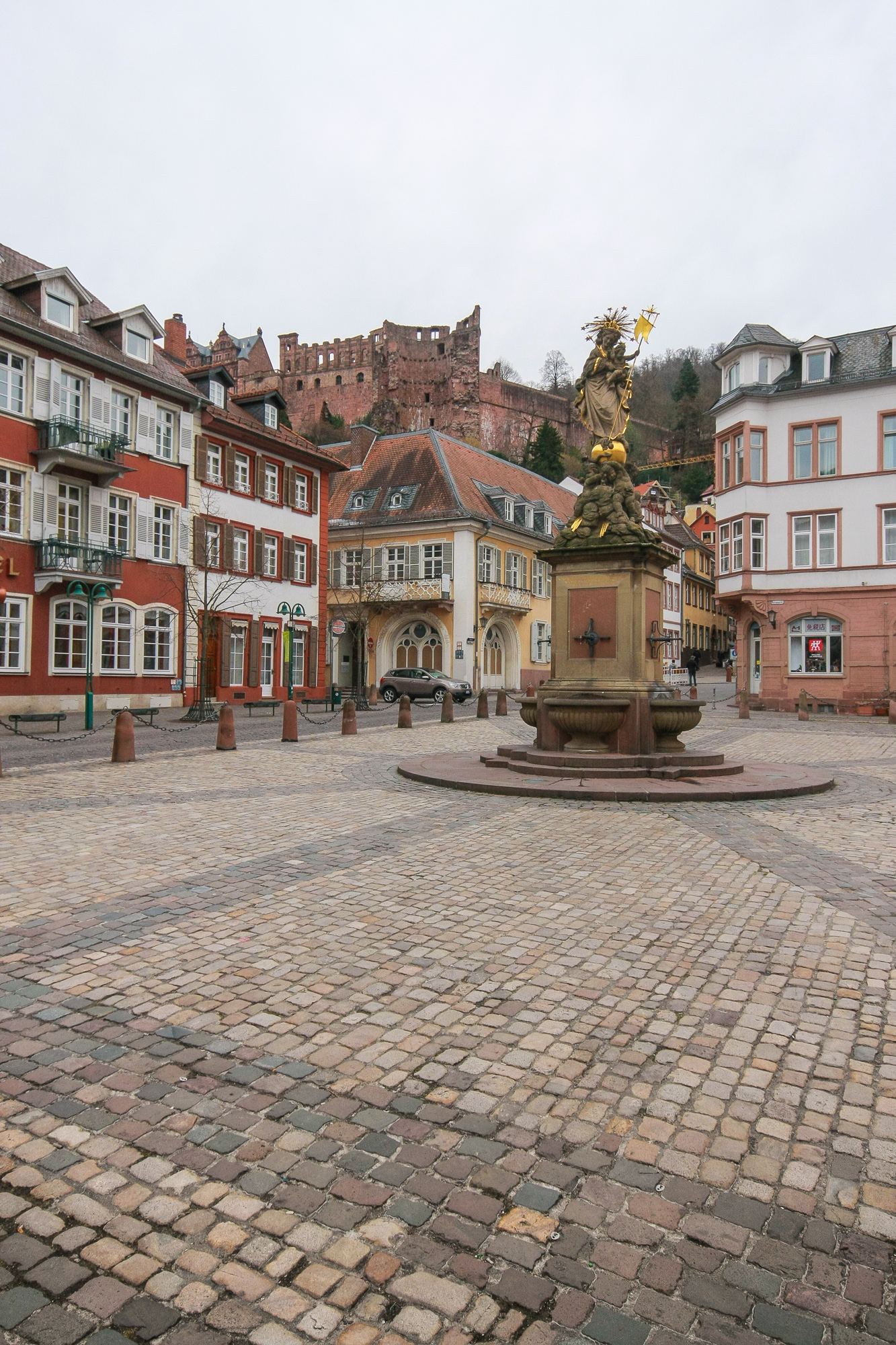
The Mariensäule in the Kornmarkt

The Kornmarkt ("Corn market") is a square in the Altstadt of Heidelberg, near the Marktplatz. The north edge of the Kornmarkt is marked by the Hauptstrasse, the south by Ingrimstrasse and Karlstrasse. The Burgweg, which leads up to Heidelberg Castle, begins to the south of the Kornmarkt.

== History ==
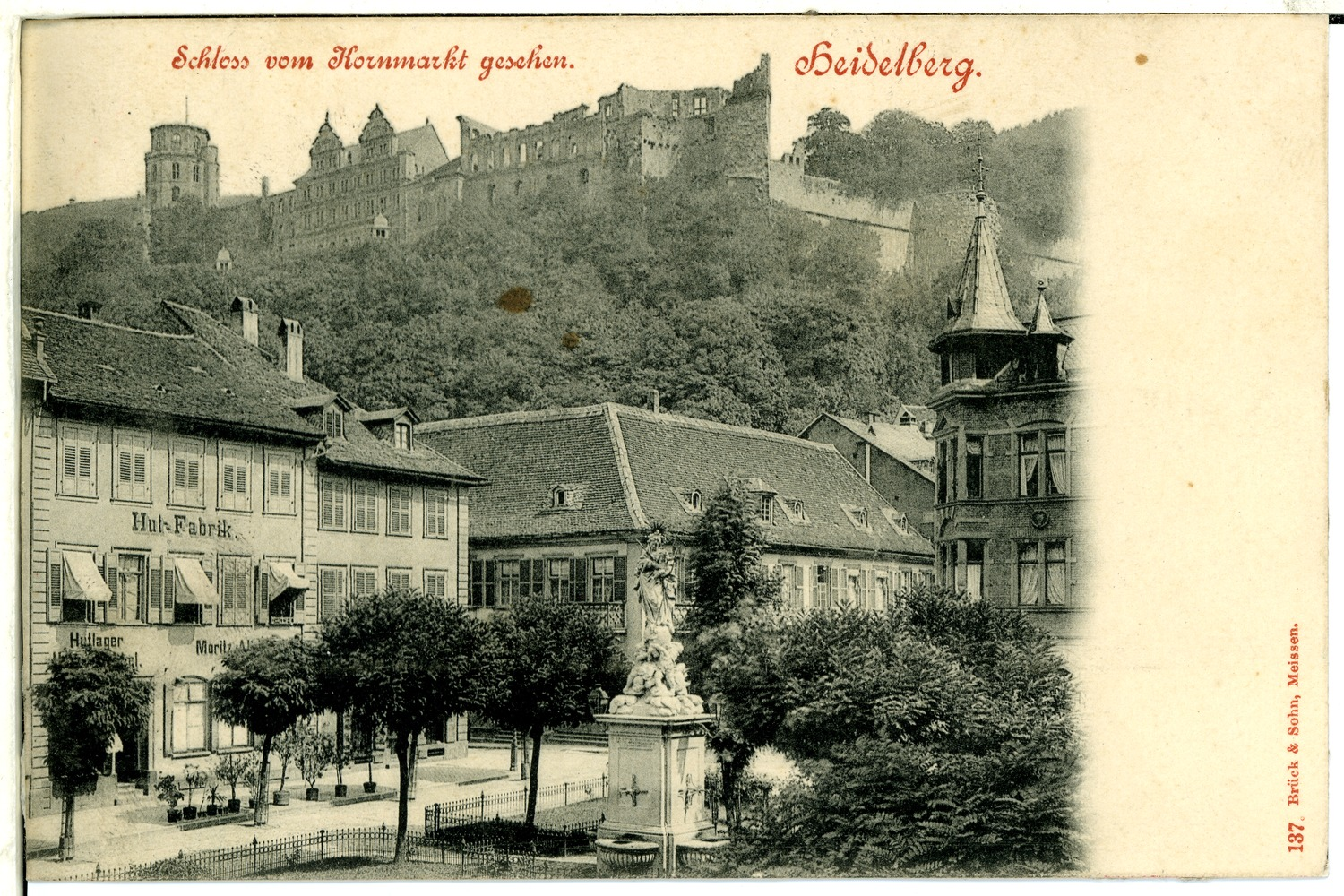
View of the Kornmarkt on an 1898 postcard

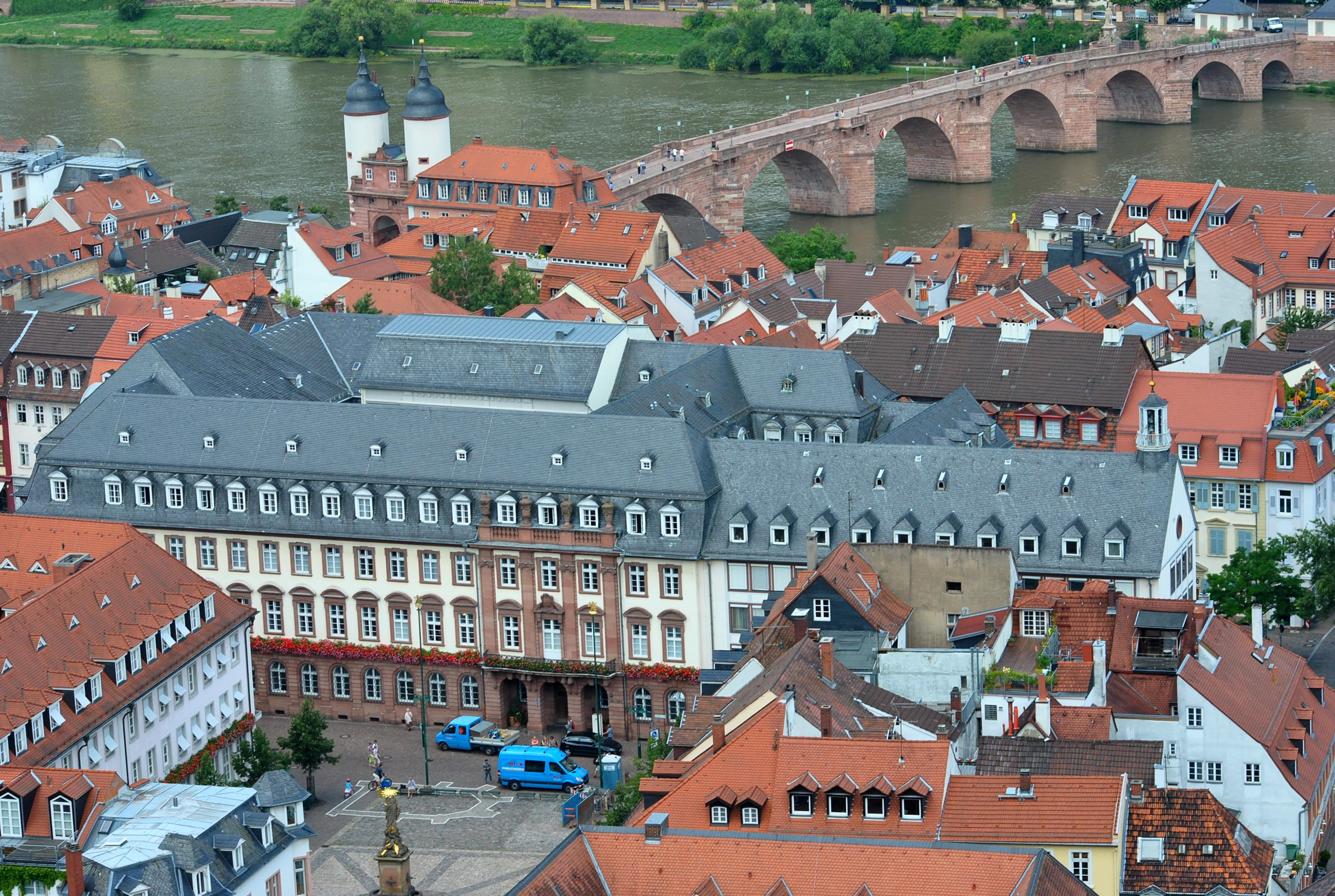
The Spital chapel marked out on the pavement; behind, the Rathaus and the Old Bridge, left of the "Prinz Karl".

The Heilig-Geist-Spital (hospital) stood on the Kornmarkt from the thirteenth century. The outline of the former chapel of the Spital is marked out on the pavement. In 1557, the buildings of the Spital were demolished at the initiative of the city council, in order to build a milk and vegetable market. At first, the square was known as the Neuer Markt ("New Market"), but later the name Kornmarkt won out.

During construction work on an underground carpark in 1986, remains of the walls of the Spital were found under the square, as well as the remains of the Spital cemetery, which was in use from the end of the 13th century until the first third of the 15th century. Around 270 out of ca. 800 graves were explored, including "plot 45" from the 14th century, a shared grave of a type common for spouses, containing two women around thirty years old, which were identified by the initial excavators as blood relatives. It has subsequently been suggested that they may have been a lesbian couple or that one of them was transgender.

== Buildings ==
North of the Kornmarkt is the Rathaus. On the southeast corner is the Palais Graimberg and on the west side is the Prinz Carl civic administrative building, which was previously a luxury hotel. In the centre of the square, is a Mary column made by Peter van den Branden in 1718, with three fountains, which is known as the Kornmarkt-Madonna.

== Bibliography ==
- Landesdenkmalamt Baden-Württemberg, Archäologische Denkmalpflege (1992). Vor dem grossen Brand : Archäologie zu Füssen des Heidelberger Schlosses. Stuttgart: Landesdenkmalamt Baden-Württemberg. ISBN 3-927714-17-8.
- Prohaska, Christine (1989). "Heimische und fremde Glasformen im Fundgut des Heidelberger Kornmarktes'" (PDF). Denkmalpflege in Baden-Württemberg. 18 (3): 138–144.
