= Marktplatz =

Marktplatz (German for "Market square") is a common name of a centrally located historic market square or marketplace in many cities in Germany, examples being:

- Marktplatz, Heidelberg, a central square in Heidelberg, Germany
- Bremer Marktplatz, a central square in Bremen, Germany
