= Kornmarkt-Madonna =

Statue in Germany

Coordinates: 49°24′43″N 8°42′42″E

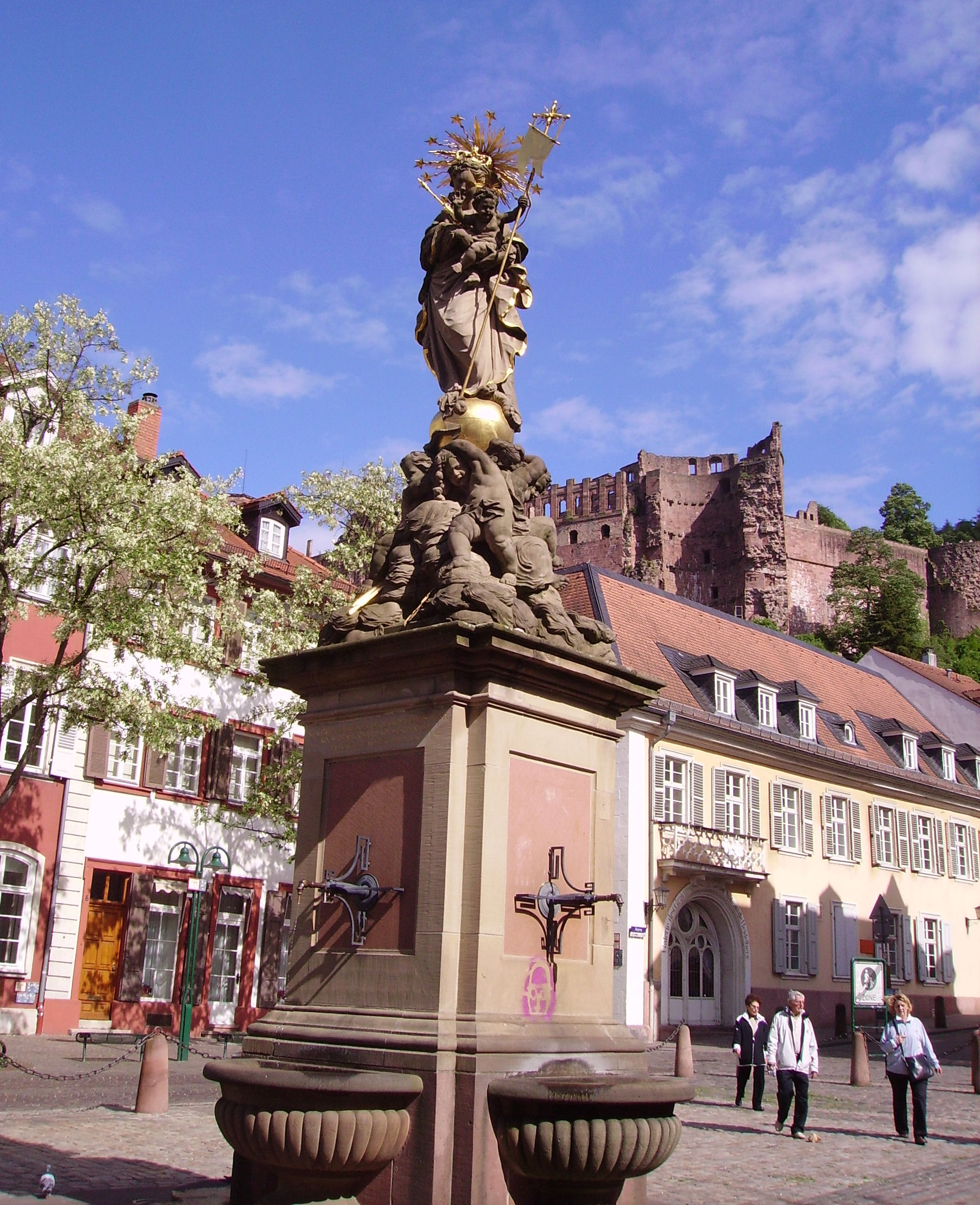
Kornmarkt-Madonna

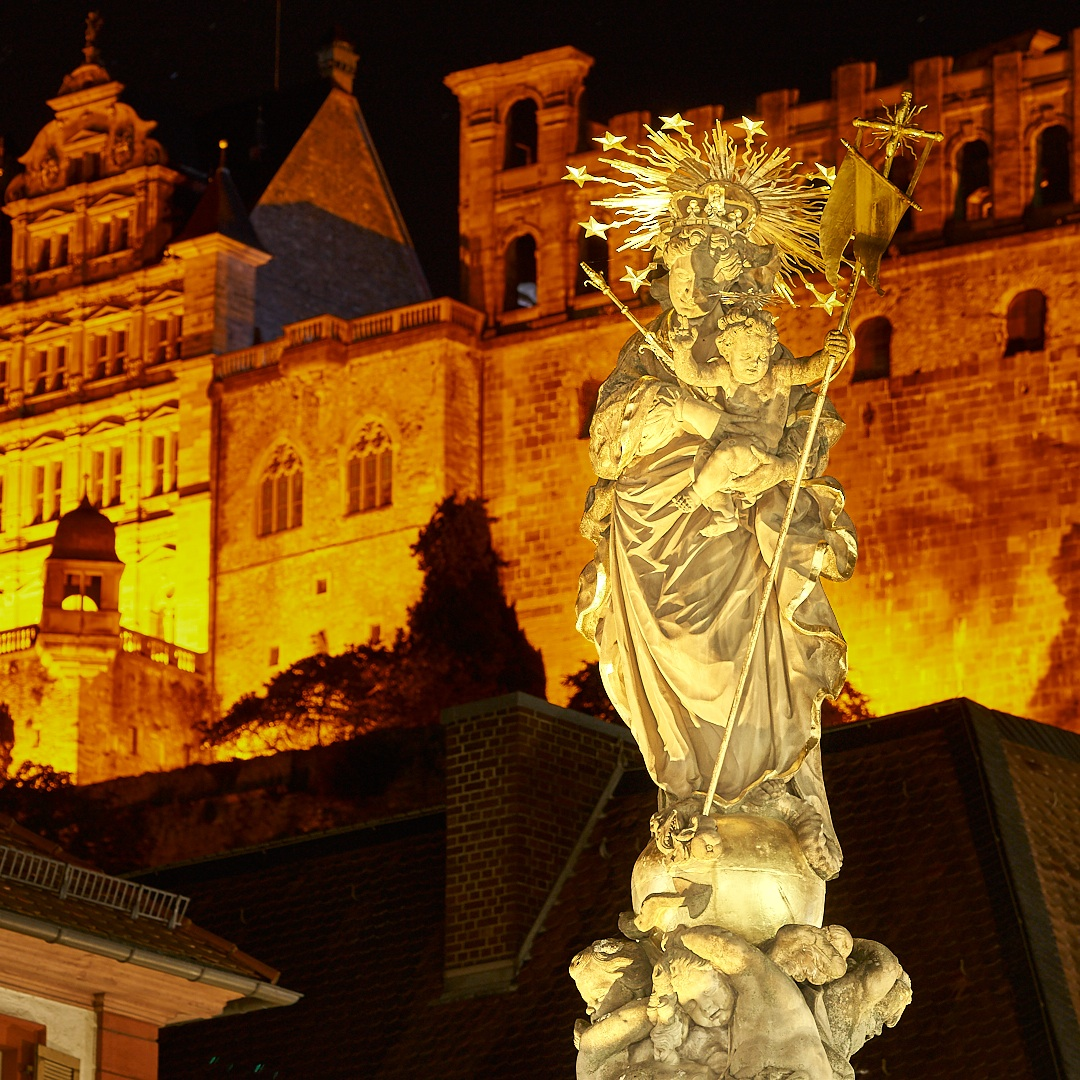
Kornmarkt-Madonna at night

The Kornmarkt-Madonna ("Cornmarket Madonna") is a fountain sculpture in the Kornmarkt in the Altstadt of Heidelberg. It is also known as the Mariensäule (Mary column) and Muttergottesbrunnen (Mother of God fountain).

== History ==
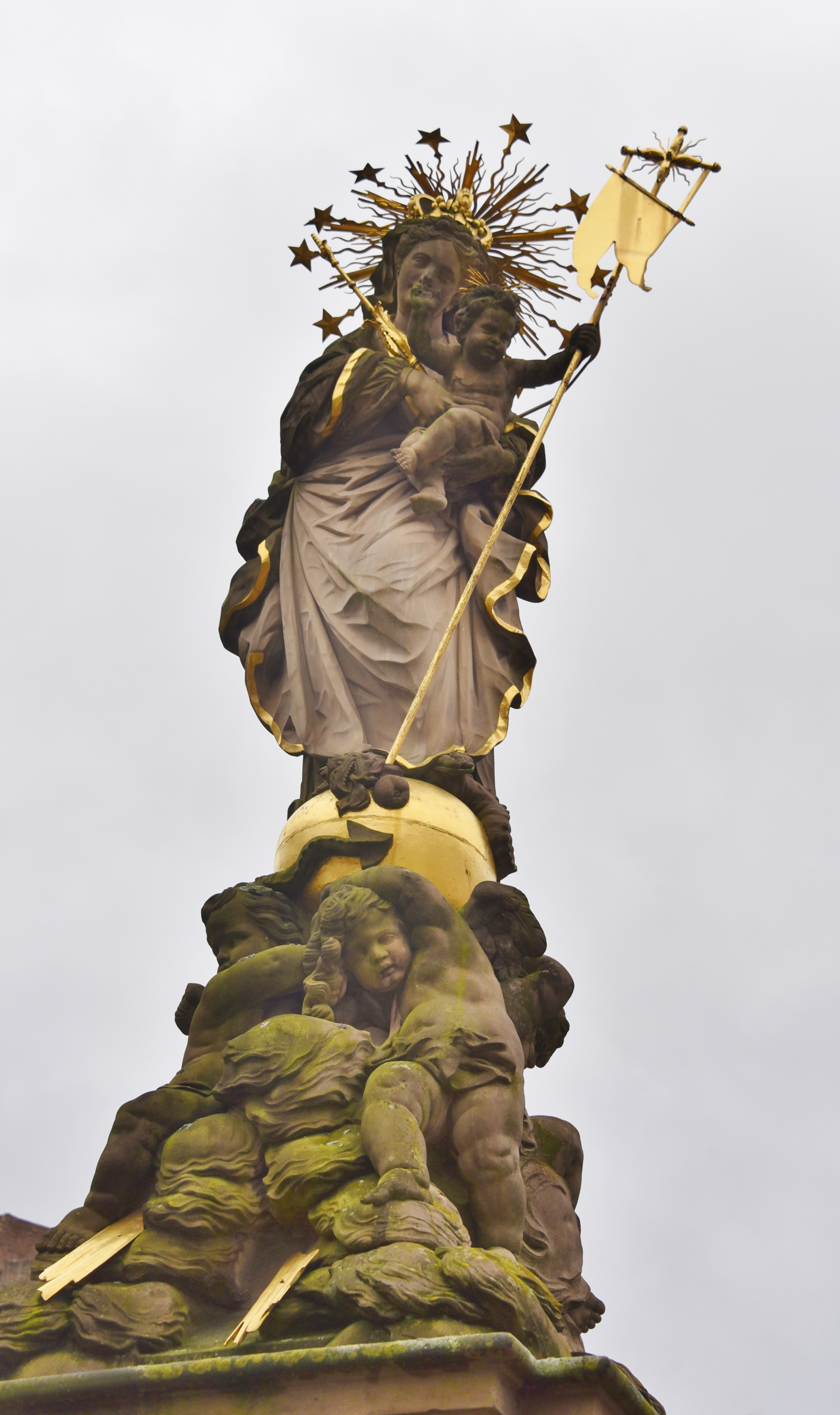
Kornmarkt-Madonna

The statue was made by Peter van den Branden and placed on a pedestal in the middle of the square in 1718. The background to this was the religious conflict between the majority Reformed Church population of Heidelberg and the Catholic Prince-Elector Charles III Philip. The statue of Mary was part of a tradition of Catholic imagery of Mary and the saints and was part of the Counterreformation, which was advanced in Heidelberg most of all by the Jesuits. For the Reformed citizens of Heidelberg, the display of the statue was considered a provocation.

There was a fountain in the northwest corner of Kornmarkt, called the Milchbrunnen ("Milk fountain"). When the Hauptstrasse was widened in 1830, the fountain was shifted to the centre of Kornmarkt and the sculpture was integrated into it. The pedestal was equipped with water spouts and surrounded by an octagonal basin. Between 1870 and 1890, this large basin was replaced by a square pedestal with three small shell-shaped basins. After 1900, the small planted area around the fountain was removed and the a stepped podium was added. Between 1938 and 1940, a copy of the statue was made for Kornmarkt; the original is now located in the Kurpfälzisches Museum.

== Description ==
Mary wears a gilt crown of rays and stars and holds a lily sceptre in her right arm. She holds the Christ child in her left arm, using her right hand to balance him. She stands on a gilded globe which is encircled by a monstrous snake. The globe is held up in turn by four putti standing on a pile of clouds. Rays of golden light emerge from these clouds. The Christ Child raises his right hand in a gesture of benediction and with his left hand he thrusts a lance (topped with a cross) into the head of the monstrous snake.

This iconography is based on the motif of "Our Lady of Victory," which became popular in the 17th century in the course of the Counterreformation. In the Heidelberg context, the slaying of the monstrous snake was intended as an allegory for the battle against the Protestant "erroneous belief." Other attributes of the sculpture point to various aspects of the Mary cult: the crown of rays with twelve stars and the lilies recall the Immaculate Conception. Crown and sceptre symbolise Mary's role as queen of heaven. The trampling of the snake and the crescent moon at her feet are symbols of her role as the Woman of the Apocalypse. The putti in the clouds stand for the Assumption of Mary and the rays of light in the clouds are the rays of mercy, which Mary sends to the world.

The pedestal bears the following bilingual inscription in Latin and German:

NON STATUAM AUT SAXUM SED QUAM DESIGNAT HONORA
NOCH STEIN NOCH BILD NOCH SÄULEN HIER
DAS KIND UND MUTTER EHREN WIR

Translation:

Honour not the statue or the rock, but her whom it symbolises.
Neither stone, not image, nor columns here;
it's the child and mother we honour

== See also ==
- Meder House

== Bibliography ==
- Hofmann, Eva (1996). "Der Muttergottesbrunnen auf dem Kornmarkt". In Gertrud P. Fels (ed.). Heidelberger Altstadtbrunnen. Schriftenreihe des Stadtarchivs Heidelberg. Vol. 7. Heidelberg: Guderjahn. ISBN 3-924973-55-5.
