= Klingenteichbach =

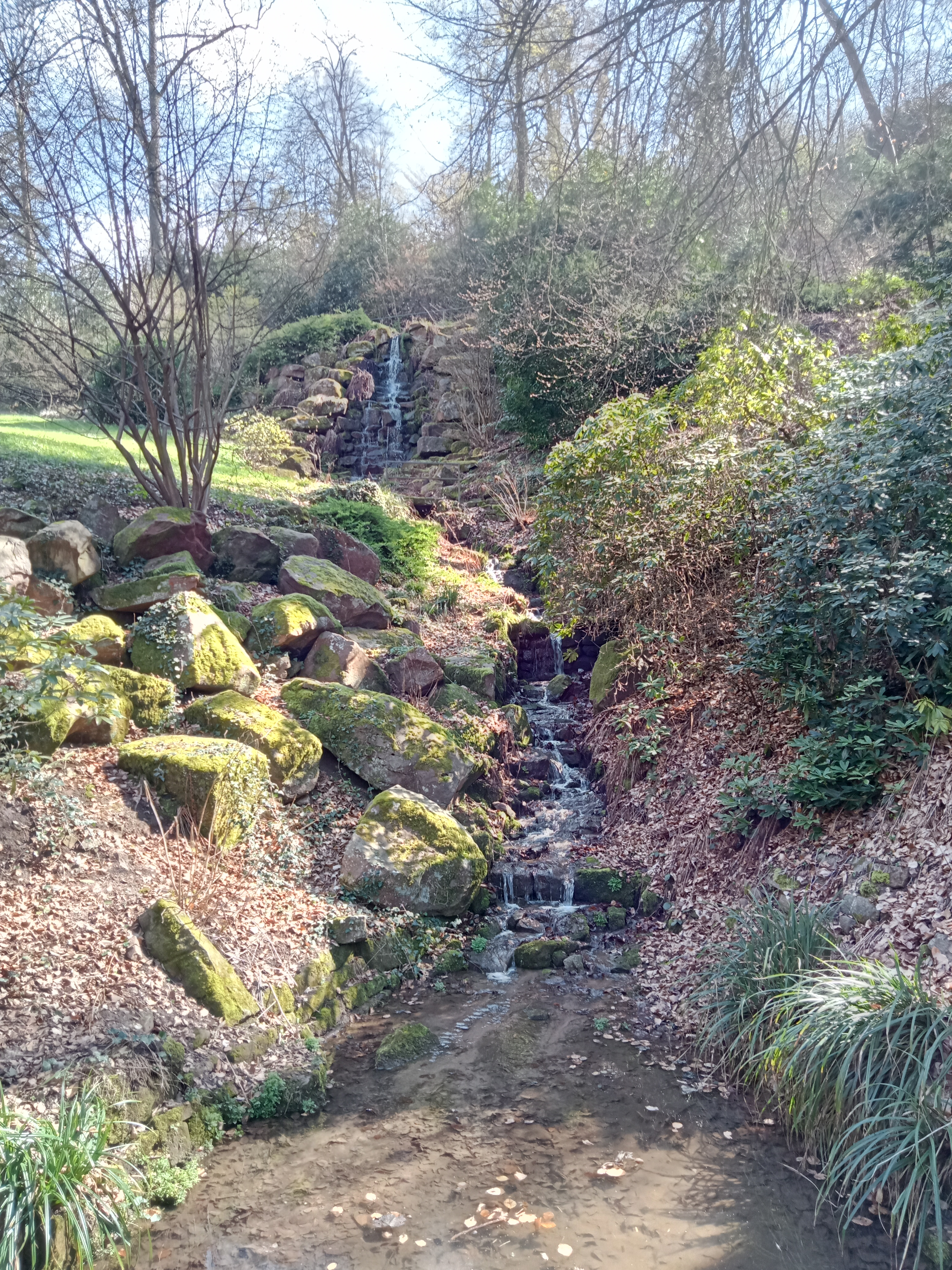
- Klingenteichbach immediately before going underground

Location
- Location: Heidelberg
- Reference no.: DE: 238993712

Physical characteristics
- Source
  - location: South of the old town of Heidelberg
  - coordinates: 49°24′15″N 8°42′54″E
  - elevation: 281 m above sea level (NHN)
- Mouth
  - location: Neckar, at Heidelberg old town
  - coordinates: 49°24′48″N 8°42′17″E
  - elevation: ca. 114 m above sea level (NHN)
- Length: 1.452 km
- Basin size: 1.239 km²

Basin features
- Progression: Neckar → Rhine → North Sea

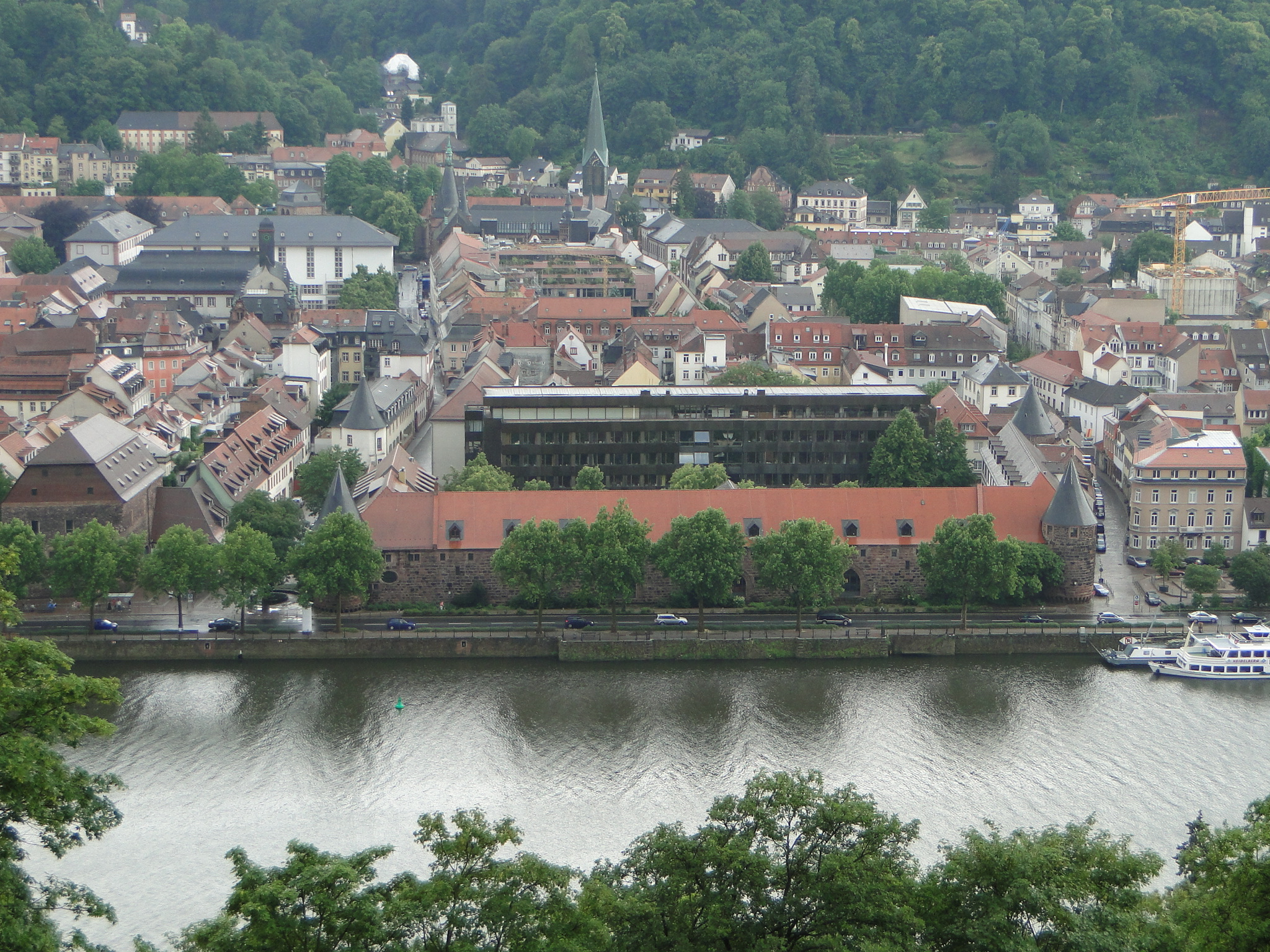
View of Heidelberg old city. The Klingenbach flows past the white building in the trees at upper left and enters the Neckar to the left of the large building in the foreground (the Marstall).

The Klingenteichbach (German for "tinkling pond stream") also called the Klingenbach or Klingengraben, is a 1.5 km long stream in Heidelberg, Baden-Württemberg, which once formed the western boundary of the town, but is now mostly covered over. It is a left tributary of the Neckar.

== Geography ==
=== Course ===
The Klingenteichbach springs from a steep cliff-face on the northwestern slope of the Königstuhl, between the Molkenkur spur and the Gaisberg at an altitude of around 281 m above sea level. It flows in a northwesterly direction through the Klinge gorge and under Klingenteichstraße, descending steeply until it reaches the Klingentor. After this, its course is less steep and it weaves in a northerly direction, past the Church of St Peter and runs underneath the Grabengasse on the western edge of Universitätsplatz, crosses the Hauptstrasse, continues under Marstallstrasse next to Marstall. Finally, it debouches into the Neckar river at an altitude of about 114 m above sea level.

The 1.452 kilometre long course of the Klingenteichbach is thus roughly 167 m below its source, giving an average incline of about 12%.

=== Catchment area ===
The catchment area of the Klingenteichbach covers 1.239 km^{2}. The upper course, on the slopes of Königstuhl, is part of the Redsandstone-Odenwald, while the lower portion at the foot of Gaisberg is on the Bergstraße in the Upper Rhine Plain. Ultimately, the water flows through the Neckar and the Rhine into the North Sea.

The cliff face above the source is part of the middle Buntsandstein layer, while the stream itself flows through the lower Buntsandstein layer below that, before entering the clay of the Neckar floodplain. The channel of the stream roughly follows an old fault line.

== History ==
The original settlement of Heidelberg was established on top of the alluvial fan deposited by the Klingenteichbach, which was high enough to protect the settlers when the Neckar flooded. The stream formed the western boundary of the medieval city, with Grabengasse ("cemetery alley") running alongside it. The city was expanded further west in 1392 and the stream was covered over. The lion fountain in Universitätsplatz, which draws on its water, once played an important role in the city's water supply.

== Bibliography ==
- Hans-Martin Mumm: "Vor der Stadtgründung. Drei Studien," in: Heidelberg. Jahrbuch zur Geschichte der Stadt, herausgegeben vom Heidelberger Geschichtsverein, 13/2009, pp. 13 ff.
- Wolfgang Seidenspinner, Manfred Benner: Heidelberg (Archäologischer Stadtkataster Baden-Württemberg, Bd. 32). Stuttgart 2007, pp. 59 et passim.
- Goetze, in: Heidelberg. Jahrbuch zur Geschichte der Stadt, 1 (1996), p. 106.
