= Hauptstrasse, Heidelberg =

Street in Heidelberg, Germany

Coordinates: 49.4116°N 8.7055°E

Hauptstrasse
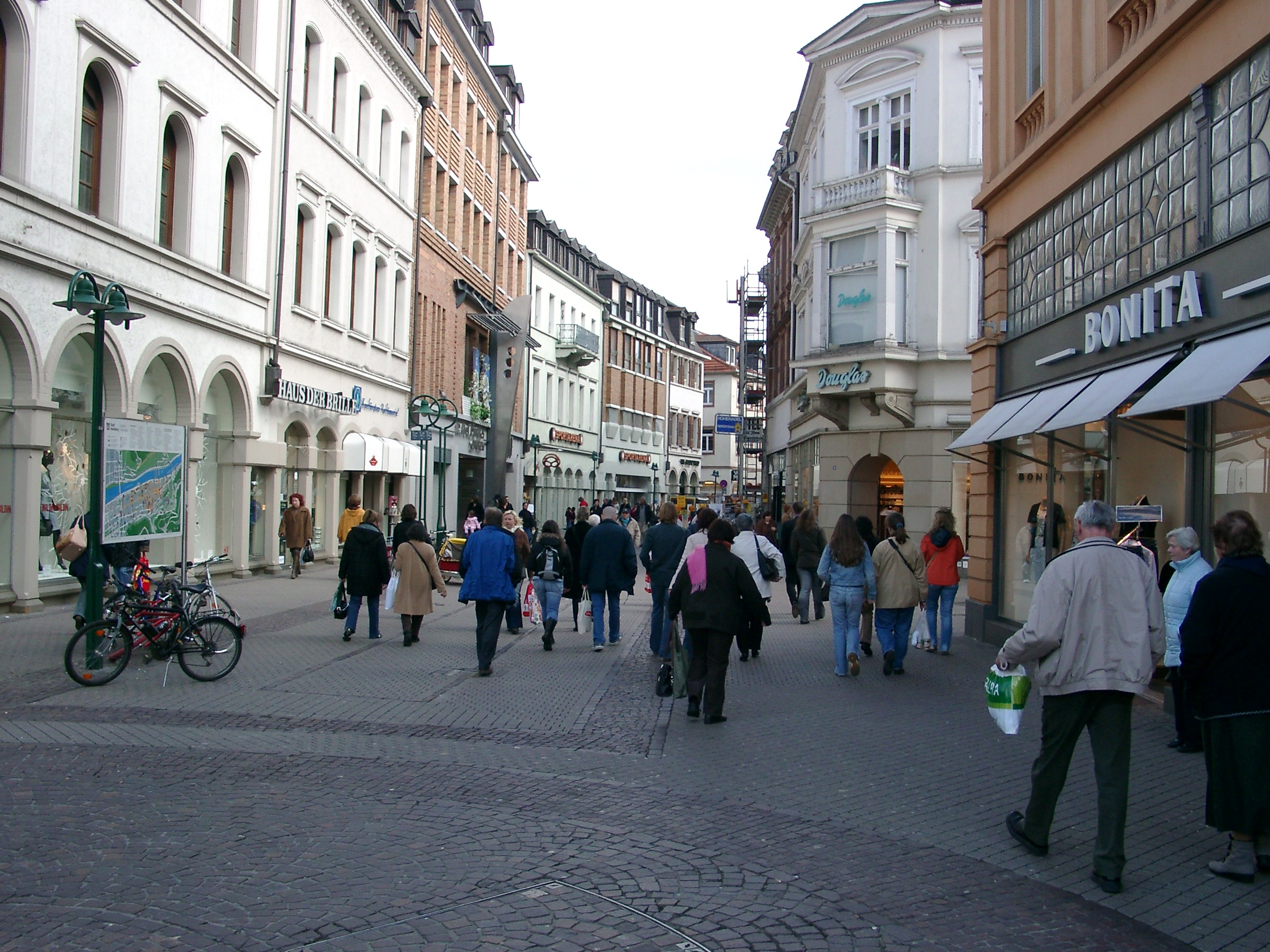
- The Hauptstrasse near Bismarckplatz

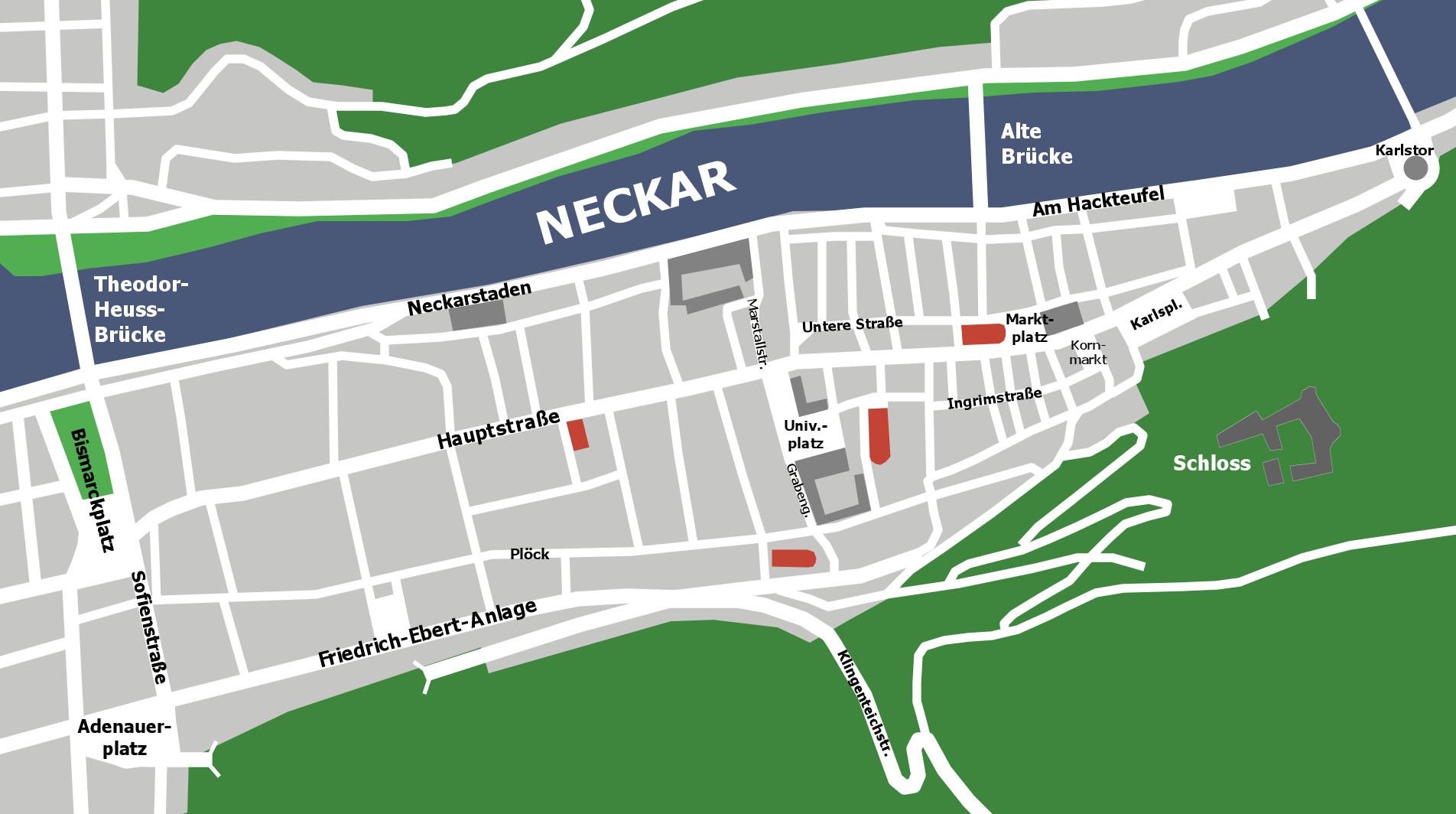
- Heidelberg's Altstadt with the Hauptstrasse in the centre
- Native name: Hauptstraße (German)
- Former name(s): Obere Straße, Speyerer Straße
- Type: pedestrian
- Length: 1.8 km (1.1 mi)
- Location: Heidelberg
- Quarter: Altstadt
- Major junctions: Anatomiegarten, Universitätsplatz, Marktplatz, Kornmarkt, Karlsplatz

Construction
- Completion: ca. 1220

Other
- Known for: Town Hall, Church of the Holy Spirit, Palais Morass, Church of Providence

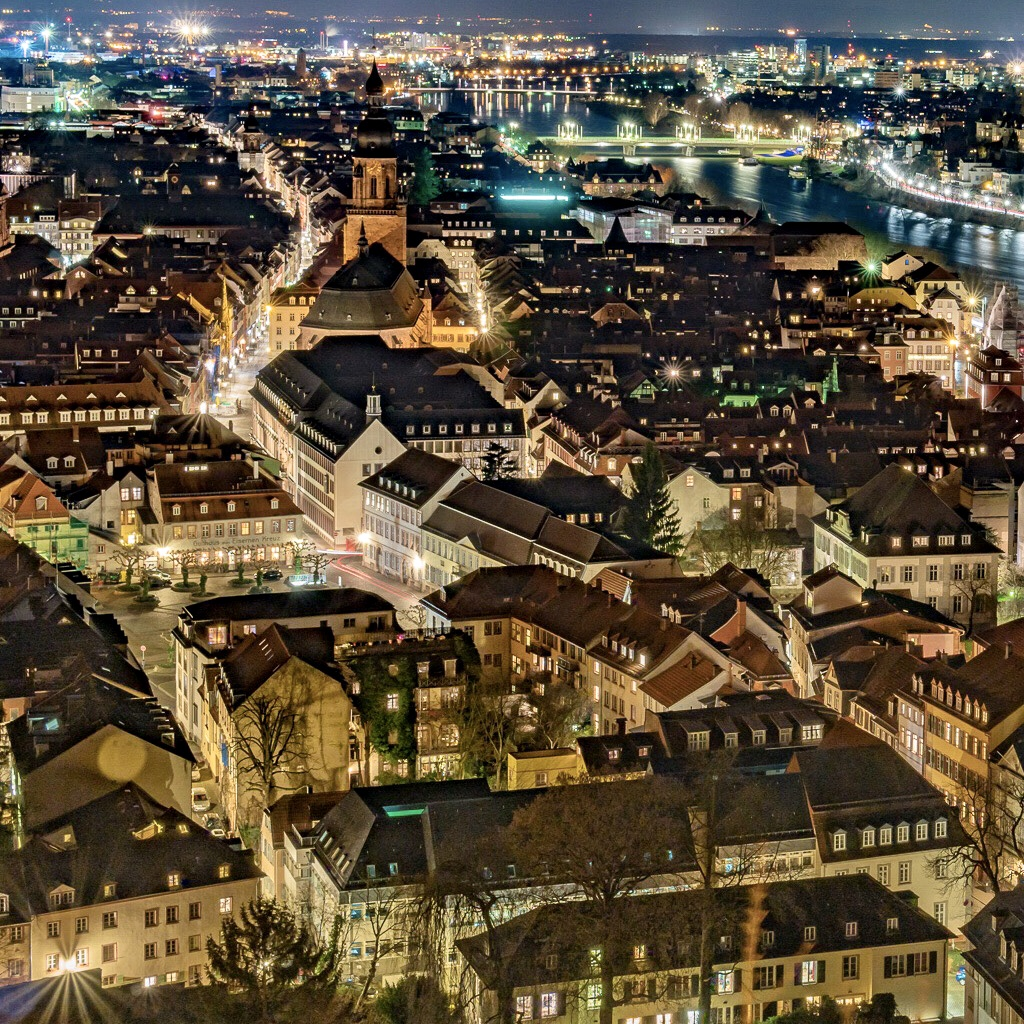
The Hauptstrasse illuminated at night

The Hauptstrasse (German: Hauptstraße, "Main Street") is the central street of Heidelberg's old town, the Altstadt, running the full length of the quarter. Today, it is a pedestrianised zone and popular shopping street. Numerous landmarks are located along its course, including the Town Hall, the Church of the Holy Spirit, and the Church of Providence.

== Route ==
The Hauptstrasse runs right through the Altstadt from Bismarckplatz in the west to the Karlstor in the east, with a slight bend following that of the Neckar river. Between Theaterstrasse and Universitätsplatz, there is a slight rise, which is caused by the alluvial fan of the now subterranean Klingenteichbach stream. The street is around 1.8 km long. It is crossed by numerous streets running from north to south (mostly called Gassen, "alleys") and there are five squares along its route. One of these, the Marktplatz was planned as a market place from the beginning, while the other four - Anatomiegarten, Universitätsplatz, Kornmarkt, Karlsplatz - were created through the demolition of buildings.

The street numbering starts at Bismarckplatz (in the west), with the uneven numbers on the north (left) side and the even numbers on the south (right) side. The highest number is 251. From 1856 until 1877, the Hauptstrasse was divided into western and eastern sections with separate numbering.

== History ==
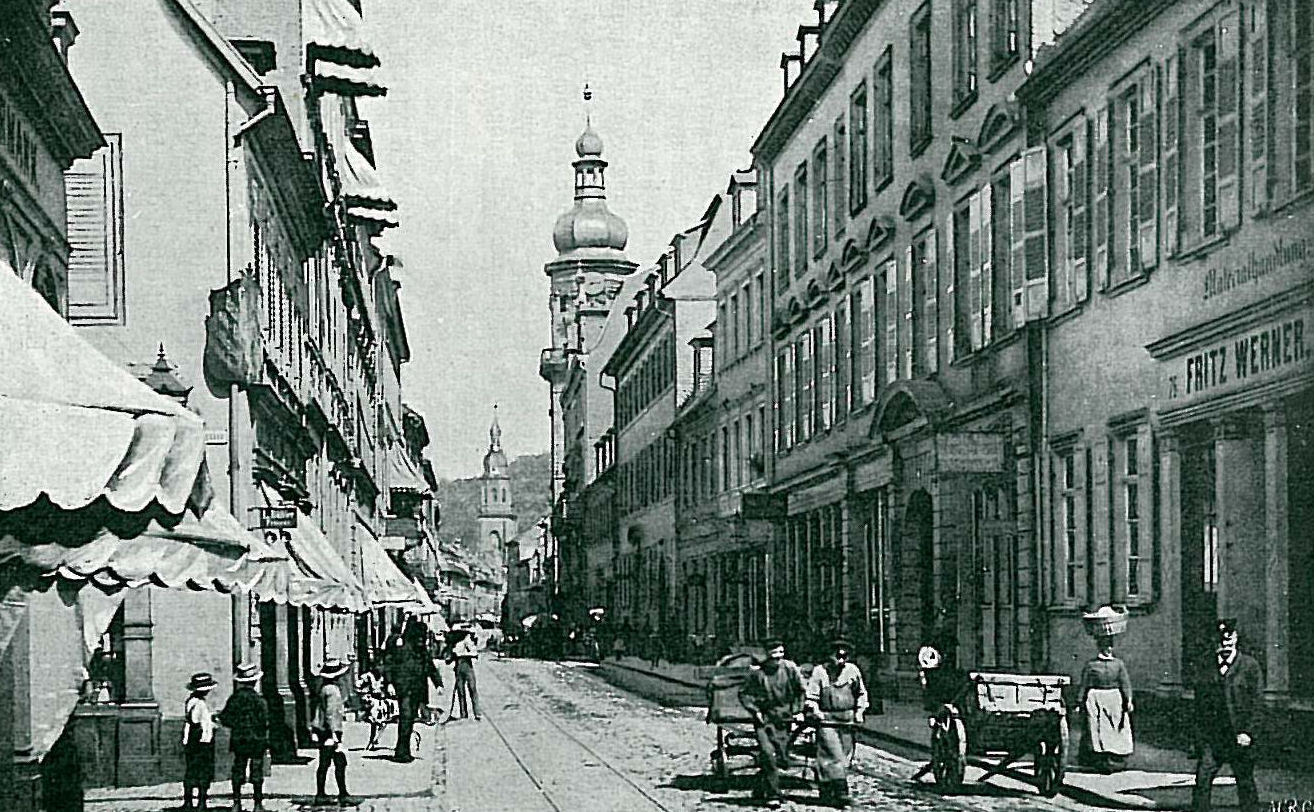
The Hauptstrasse around 1890 with the tracks of the horse-drawn tram and the towers of the Churches of Providence and the Holy Spirit.

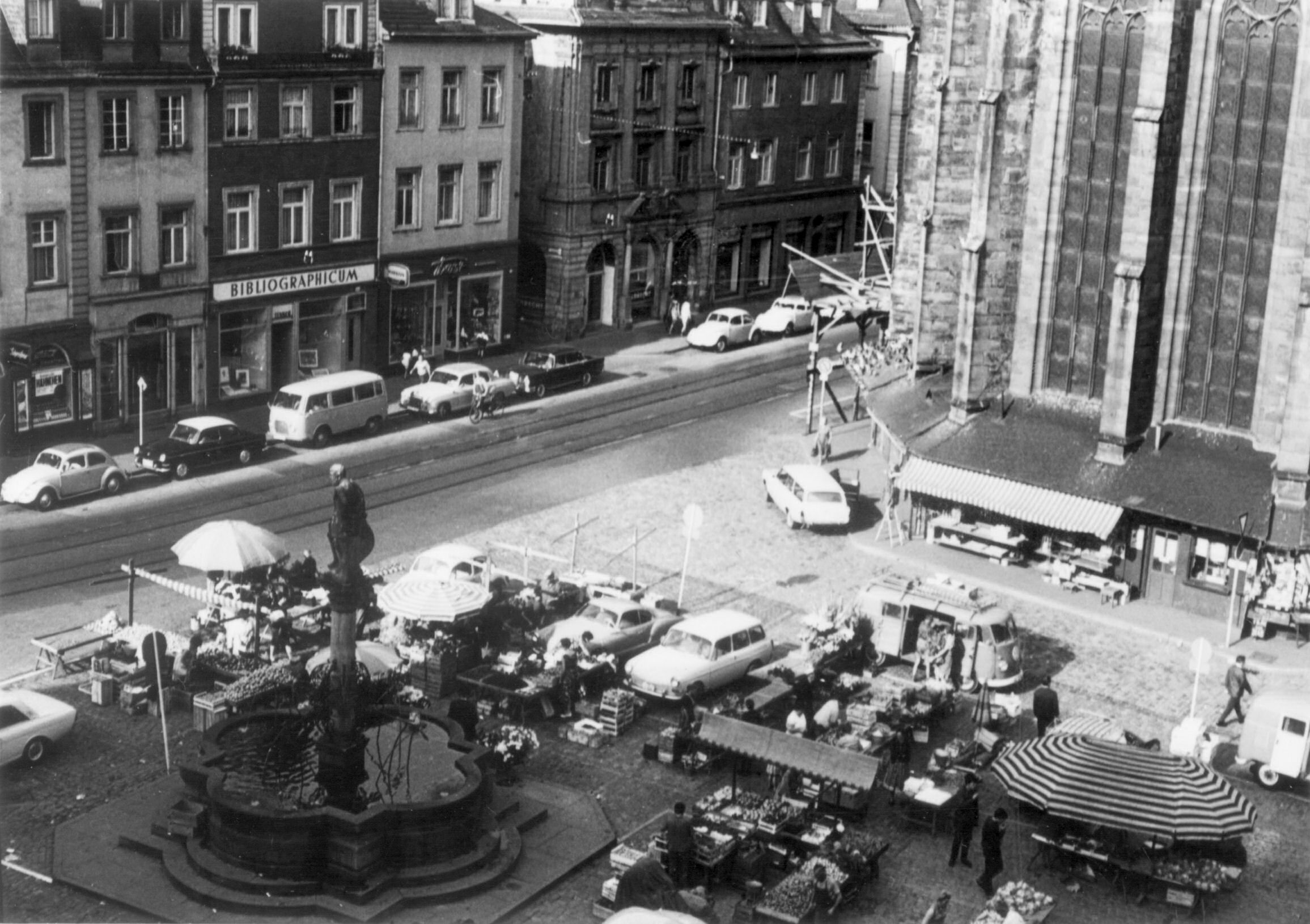
The Hauptstrasse in the Marktplatz, when still open to cars, 1965

There was a road on the course of the current Hauptstrasse even before the foundation of Heidelberg in 1220, which was used as the central axis of the new city. In 1391, this street was named German: Obere Gasse ("Upper Alley"), in 1491 Latin: platea magna ("Big Street") and in 1508 German: Speierer Straße ("Speyer Street"). It has borne the name German: Hauptstraße, "Main Street" since 1689. City gates stood at the east and west ends of the street. In the east, in the area of the modern Plankengasse, there was the German: Obere Tor ("Upper Gate"), which was replaced by the Karlstor in the 18th century. At the western end of the original city, in the area of the modern Universitätsplatzes, was the German: Niedrige Tor ("Lower Gate") or German: Speyerer Tor ("Speyer Gate"), which was later known as the German: Mitteltor ("Central Gate") and was demolished in 1827. Following the expansion of the city to the west in 1392, the graves outside the gate were dug up and the Hauptstrasse was extended. At the new western edge of the city, in the region of the modern Bismarckplatz, a new gate was built, the German: Äußere Speyerer Tor ("Outer Speyer Gate"), later replaced by the German: Mannheimer Tor ("Mannheim Gate").

After the destruction of Heidelberg in the War of the Palatine Succession in 1693, the city was rebuilt in the baroque style, but retaining the old streetplan. The Hauptstrasse retained its original course and width.

In 1885, the first Heidelberg horse-drawn tramline was opened, which ran on rails from the old train station at what is now Adenauerplatz along the Hauptstrasse to the Karlstor. A second horse was required for the light rise between Theaterstrasse and Universitätsplatz (then known as Ludwigsplatz). The horse-drawn trams were replaced with electric trams in 1902.

Under Mayor Reinhold Zundel, the Hauptstrasse was modified and pedestrianised. In 1969, through-traffic was banned. From 6 November 1971, the western part up to Universitätsplatz was closed to all traffic on weekends. On 15 July 1972, the section from Universitätsplatz to Marktplatz was converted to a tram-only street and from 1 January 1974, it was also closed to all traffic on weekends. On 2 July 1975 and on 29 April 1976, the town council decided to convert most streets of the Altstadt into pedestrian zones. On 4 July of the same year, the trams were stopped and the tracks were covered with asphalt on 20 September; the powerlines for the trams were removed on 7 January 1977. The conversion to a pedestrian zone was completed on 30 September 1978.

== Use ==
Until its closure to through-traffic in 1969, the Hauptstrasse was an important route for motor traffic and a two-track tram. Since the completion of the conversion in 1978, the whole of the Hauptstrasse except for a short section between Kornmarkt and Karlstor is a pedestrian zone. It is by far the busiest shopping street in Heidelberg and the 43rd busiest in Germany as of 2013, with an average of 5618 people visiting it per hour over the period 2004 to 2013. In addition to the shops and restaurants, there are several significant institutions, like the Town Hall, the Kurpfälzisches Museum, and parts of the University. The Hauptstrasse and the squares along it are often used for events, like the Heidelberger Herbst, the Christmas markets, and the Heidelberg half-marathon.

== Significant buildings ==
North side		South side	
Nr. 37:	Odeon-Lichtspielhaus	Nr. 46:	Bankhaus
Nr. 47–51:	Friedrichsbau	Nr. 52:	Haus zum Riesen
Nr. 75:	Gasthaus Perkeo		Church of Providence
Nr. 97:	Palais Morass	Nr. 110:	Wormser Hof
Nr. 113:	Badischer Hof	Nr. 120:	Haus Neukirch
Nr. 117:	Kümmelspalterei	Nr. 126:	Wohn- und Bankhaus
	Church of the Holy Spirit	Nr. 168:	Haus Meder
		Nr. 178:	Haus zum Ritter
Nr. 191–201:	Town Hall	Nr. 190:	Kurpfälzische Hofapotheke
Nr. 207:	Wohnhaus Roßhirt	Nr. 198:	Wohn- und Geschäftshaus
Nr. 209:	Palais Boisserée		
Nr. 213:	Gasthaus Zum Seppl		
Nr. 217:	Gasthaus Zum Roten Ochsen		
Nr. 235:	Palais Weimar / Völkerkundemuseum	Nr. 234:	Haus Buhl

== Bibliography ==
- Melanie Mertens, Landesamt für Denkmalpflege (ed): Denkmaltopographie Bundesrepublik Deutschland, Kulturdenkmale in Baden-Württemberg, Bd. II.5.1, Stadtkreis Heidelberg. Thorbecke-Verlag, Ostfildern, 2013, pp. 231–291. ISBN 978-3-7995-0426-3
