= Church of Providence, Heidelberg =

Protestant church in Heidelberg, Germany

Coordinates: 49°24′40″N 8°42′7″E

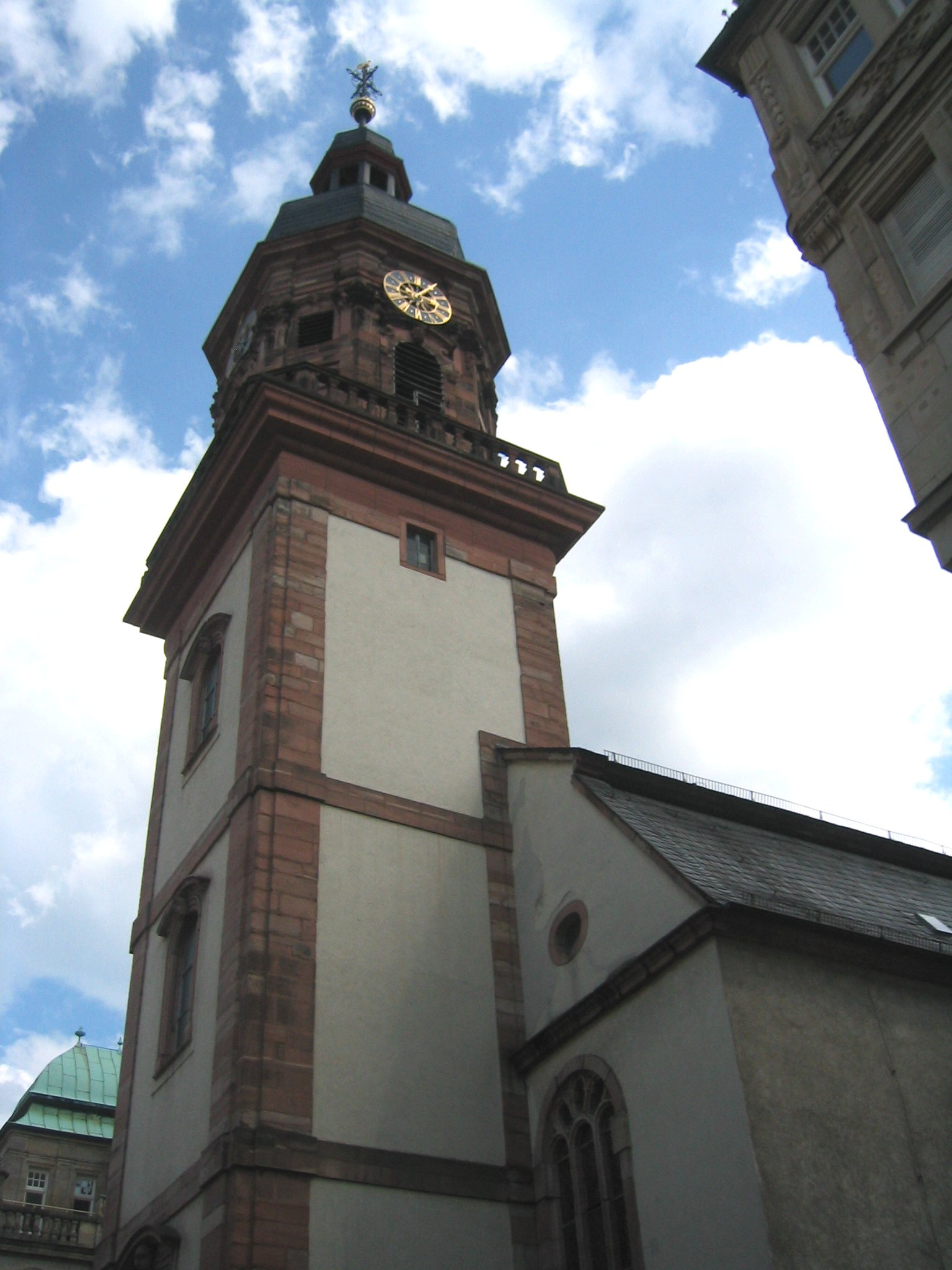
View of the tower of the Church of Providence, seen from the Hauptstrasse.

The Church of Providence (German: Providenzkirche) is a Protestant church on the Hauptstrasse of the old town of Heidelberg. Until the union of the Protestant Church in Baden in 1821, this was the Lutheran church of central Heidelberg, while the Church of the Holy Spirit was the meeting place of the Calvinist church.

== History ==
The Church of Providence was built between 1659 and 1661 according to a design by Theodor Reber. It is located on the land of the former royal gardens of the Electors. Since the church was built on the initiative of Elector Charles I Louis, whose motto was Dominus providebit (Latin for "the Lord will provide"), it was named the Church of Providence. When the city was sacked during the War of the Palatine Succession in 1693, it was completely destroyed, but it was rebuilt between 1715 and 1721 under the management of Johann Jakob Rischer. Between 1878 and 1885, the interior was completely remodelled by Hermann Behagel, to create a lighter nave in the Renaissance Revival style.

== Architecture ==
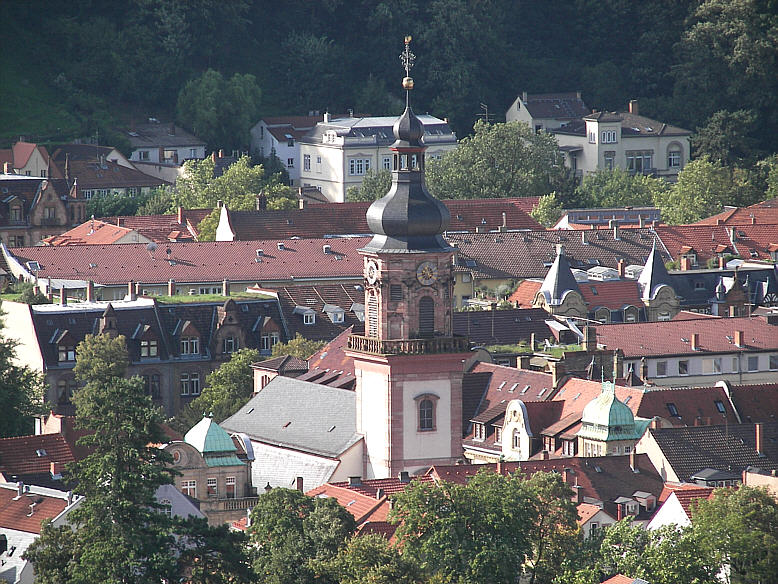
View of the Church of Providence from the Philosophers' Way.

The Church of Providence was built as a single-nave aisleless church with a ridge turret. After the 1717–1721 rebuilding, a tower was added at the northern end. A three-story white plastered tower supports an octagonal clock tower made of buntsandstein, surrounded by a balustrade. The slate roof of the clock tower and the lantern on top of it are structured as a Welsche canopy. Atop the spire is a ball with a cross and a rooster.

The white plastered surrounding walls with bow windows and oval openings survived the 1693 destruction, as did the gable on the north side. Originally, all the windows had neo-Gothic tracery, but this only survives on the north gable. The key stones with angels' faces also survive in the nave windows. The church roof was remodelled as a slate gambrel roof in 1698.

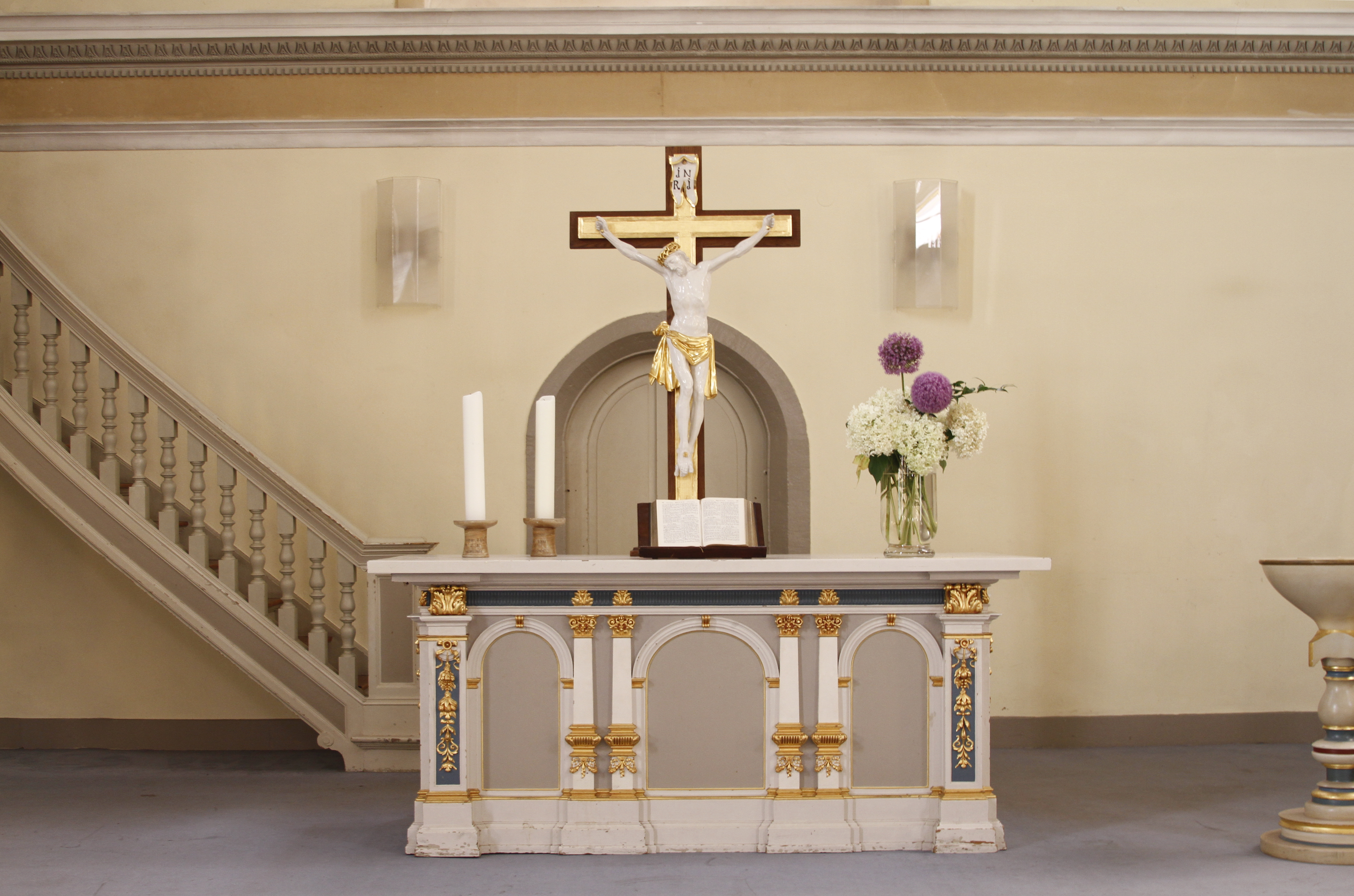
Altar

The interior was completely remodelled in two phases in the 19th century. After the choir gallery was separated off in 1852 and the baroque organ was installed in the north gallery, a new central window was placed on the site of the organ in the choir, with a figure of Christ making a blessing in the Nazarene style, probably from the workshop of Heinrich Beiler the Elder, the leading Heidelberg historicist glass painter. In a second phase of renovation between 1878 and 1885, the architect and church building inspector Hermann Behaghel remodelled the space in the neo-renaissance style in which it remains to this day. Behaghel had the old galleries removed and erected single-story galleries on three sides in symmetry with the axis of the church. The choir with its altar and pulpit was set off by steps and a balustrade. The stucco ceiling was also an addition by Behaghel. The two side-windows of the choir depict Grand Duke Charles Frederick (left) and Elector Otto Henry (right). They were donated in 1886 by the University of Heidelberg on their five-hundredth anniversary.

== Organ ==
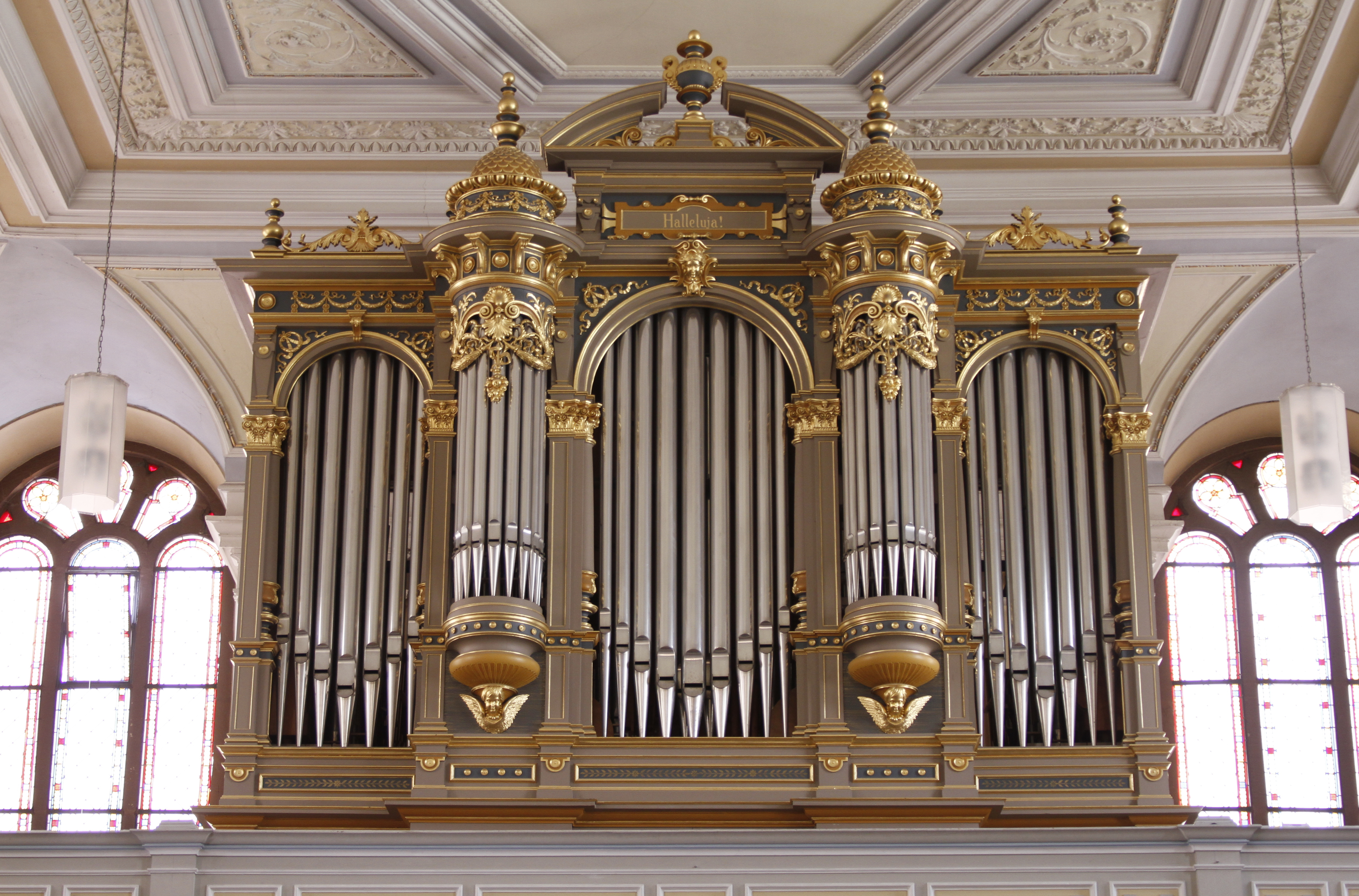
Organ case

The church contains Heidelberg's oldest surviving organ. It is based on an instrument made by the workshop of the organ maker Matthias Burkard in 1885.

In 1986, the instrument underwent a thorough renovation at the hands of Giengener Orgelmanufaktur Gebr. Link, in which, as far as possible, it was restored to its original condition. After this, it had 41 stops, which could be played on three manuals with pedals.

== Bells ==
In the tower of the church, there is a five-note set of bells, which were cast in Heidelberg by Friedrich Wilhelm Schilling in 1955. The bells have the following disposition:

Bell 1 – f′, Bell 2 – as′, Bell 3 – b′, Bell 4 – des″, Bell 5 – es″

== Bibliography ==
- Reinhard Störzner (ed.): 350 Jahre Providenzkirche Heidelberg. Heidelberg 2011.
- Anneliese Seeliger-Zeiss: Evang. Providenzkirche Heidelberg. Verlag Schnell & Steiner, 2. neu bearbeitete Auflage, Regensburg 2011.
- Max Stopmann: Heidelberg am Neckar. Kunstverlag Edm. von König, Heidelberg/Dielheim 1998, ISBN 3-921934-15-X, p. 76.
- Heide Seele: Edition die Deutschen Städte – Heidelberg. C. J. Bucher, München 1995, ISBN 3-7658-0984-5, p. 100.
