= Bismarckplatz, Heidelberg =

Square in Heidelberg, Germany

Coordinates: 49.409427°N 8.693163°E

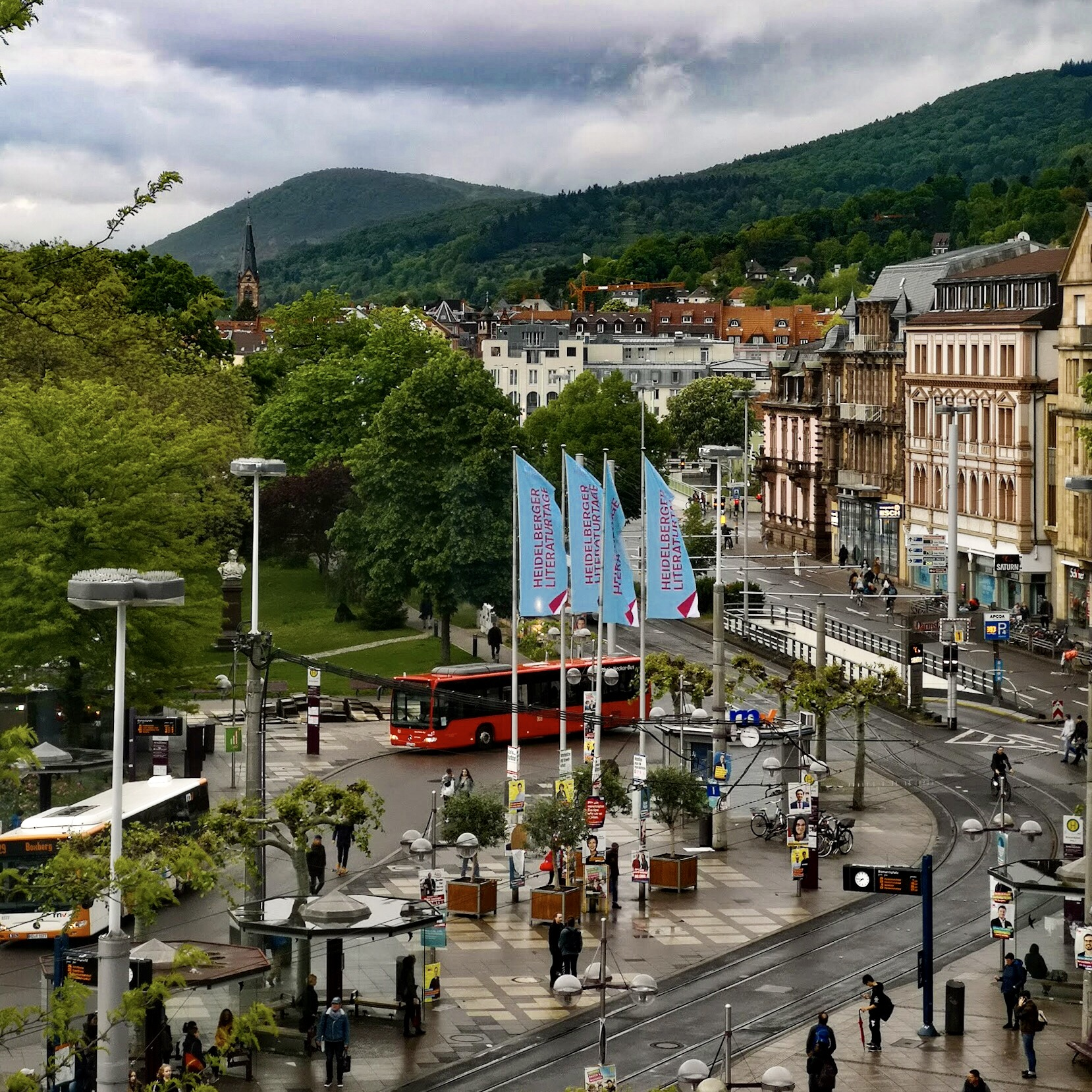
Bismarkplatz with flags for Heidelberg literature day 2019

The Bismarckplatz in Heidelberg is a square named for Otto von Bismarck, located at the western end of the Hauptstrasse, which forms the boundary between the old city and the suburb of Bergheim. It is one of the main squares of Heidelberg and one of the central nodes of the public transport system, along with Willy-Brandt-Platz in front of the train station.

== History ==
In 1392, city walls were extended out to the area of modern Bismarckplatz and the inhabitants of the village of Bergheim, which had previously stood there, were forced to move inside the new circuit of the walls. At the beginning of the 19th century, the city's botanical gardens were located to the south of the modern square (these are now the Stadtgarten, but were St Anna cemetery until 1845).

From 1847 to 1874, there was a harbour in the area, which provided berths for the growing amount of river boat transport. Renting out the berths was an important source of income for the city. However, because of the expansion of railway transport from 1845 and because the harbour was badly designed (the access to the Neckar river was too narrow, meaning that the water in the harbour could not circulate properly and became putrid), the harbour was filled in 1874 and a park erected on the site. The whole area was named Bismarckplatz on 3 November 1874, in honour of Chancellor Otto von Bismarck's 60th birthday. Over time, the Bismarckplatz developed into the most important transport node in the city.

In 1961, the Horten shopping centre (now: Galeria Kaufhof) opened on the south side of the square. Many old buildings were demolished to make way for this structure, which dominates the area visually to this day. The facade was renovated in 1982. The shopping centre is closed since 31 January 2024.

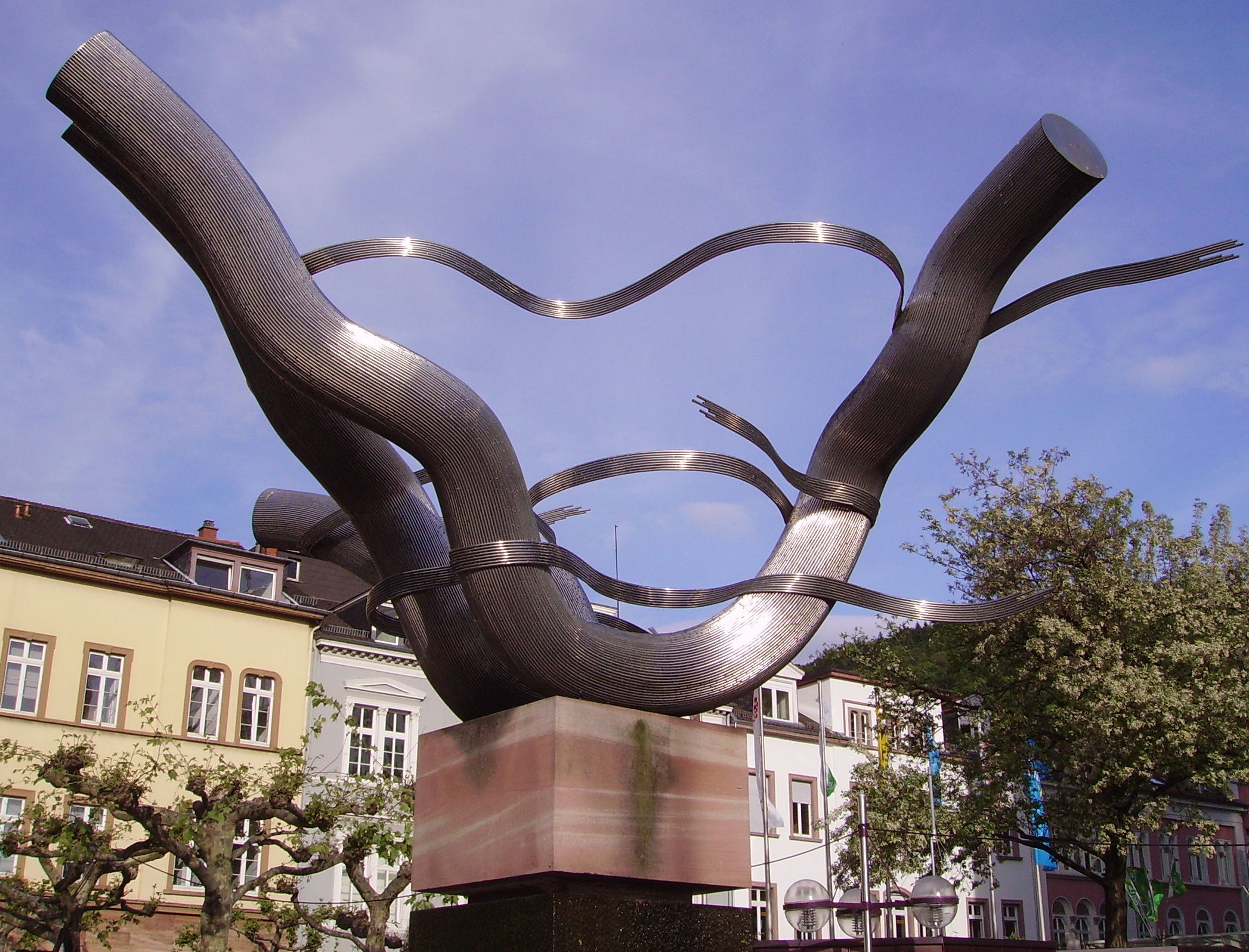
The "Spaghettisäule"

As part of mayor Reinhold Zundel's modernisation programme in late 1970s, the tram network was removed from the neighbouring Hauptstrasse, which became a pedestrian zone. The resulting changes led to Bismarckplatz's current layout, which included renovations to the facade of the Horten shopping centre and the installation of a fountain sculpture by the couple Matschinsky-Denninghoff (popularly known as the Spaghettisäule, "spaghetti columns"), in 1985. The renovated square was opened to the public on 6 July 1986.

== In popular culture ==
The people of Heidelberg's ambivalent relationship to Bismarckplatz is reflected in a local addition to the song I Lost My Heart in Heidelberg, which refers to the omnipresence of pigeons in the area:

Dreggische Glatz, dreggische Glatz,
Die kriggt man uff em Bismarckplatz

Translation:

A dirty bald patch, dirty bald patch,
which you get on the Bismarckplatze

== Gallery ==
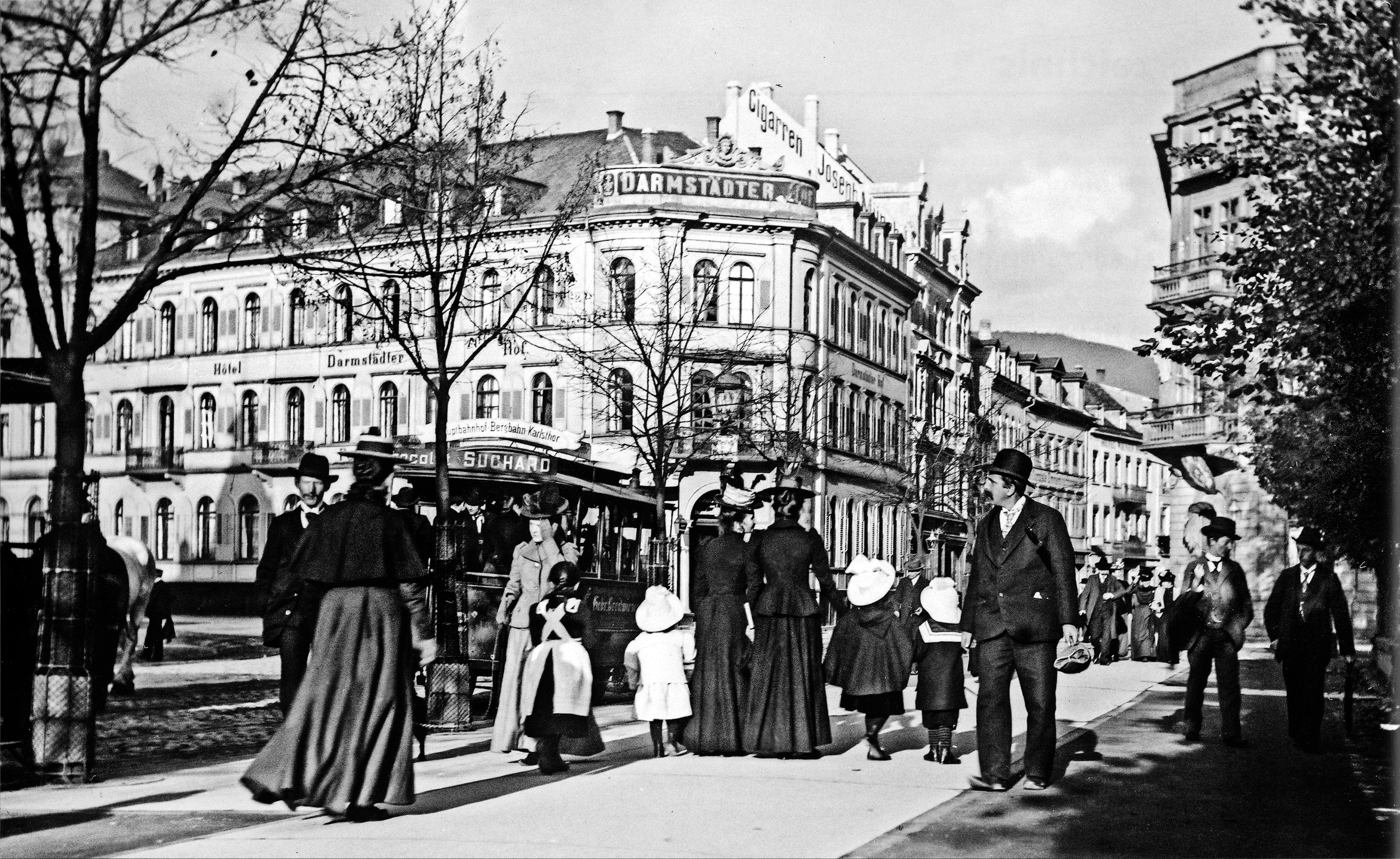
Bismarckplatz in 1895

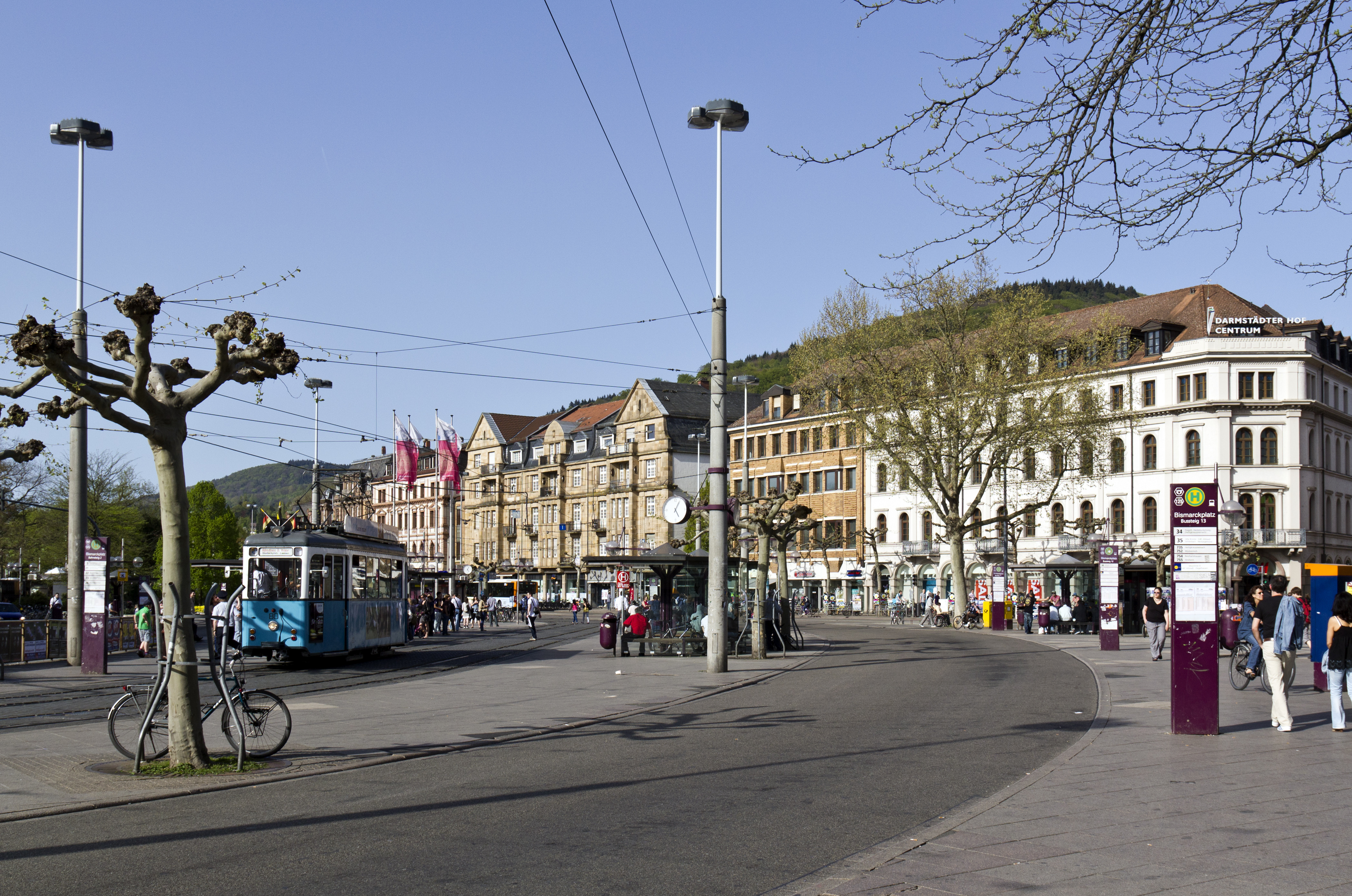
Bismarckplatz in 2016

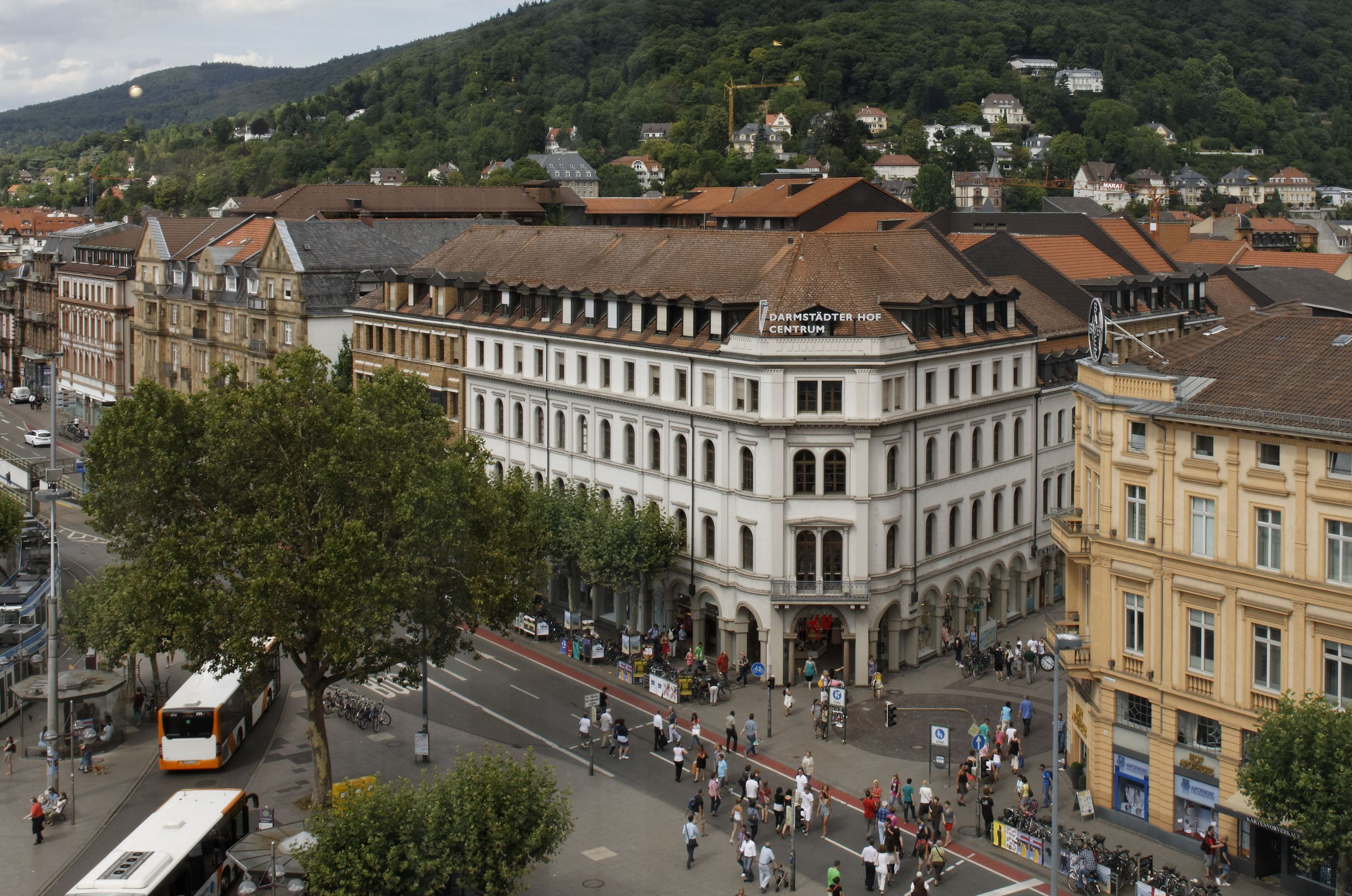
Darmstädter Hof Centrum, a former hotel on the corner of Sofienstraße and Bismarckplatz)

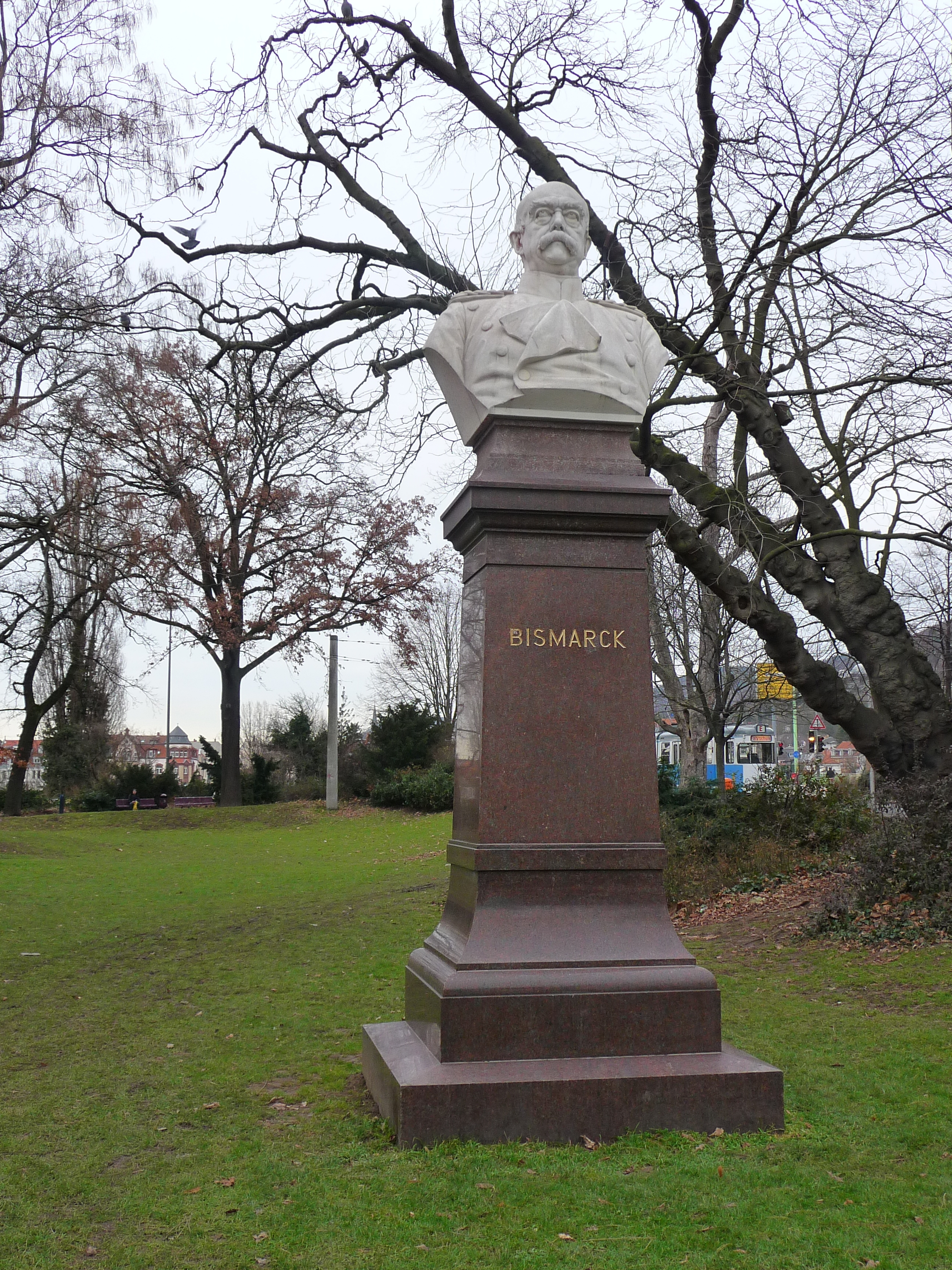
Bust of Bismarck in the Bismarckgarten (by Adolf von Donndorf)

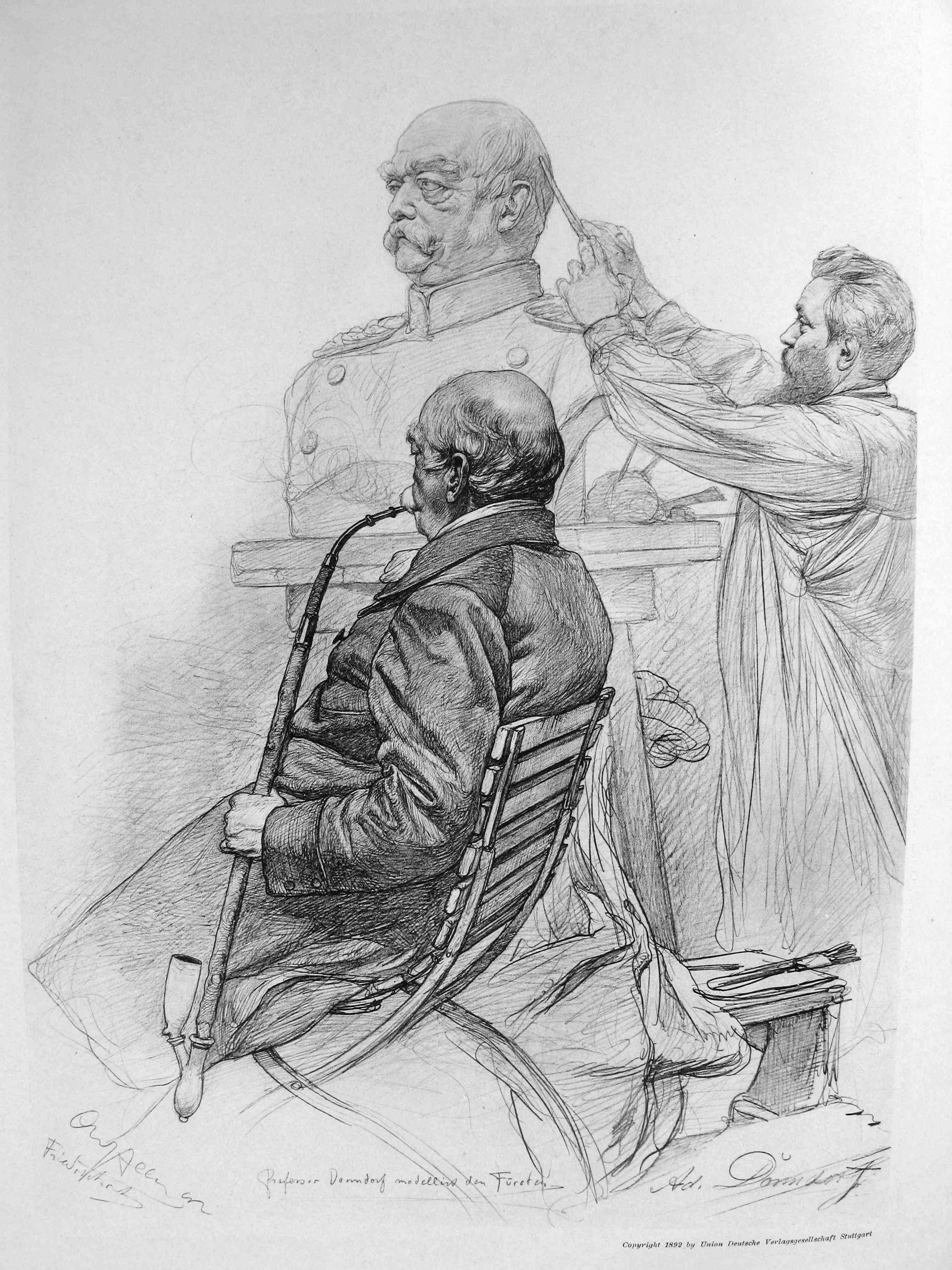
Bismarck sitting for Adolf von Donndorf (1892)
