= Friedrichsbau (Heidelberg) =

Historic building in Heidelberg, Germany

Coordinates: 49°24′37.5804″N 8°41′53.1132″E

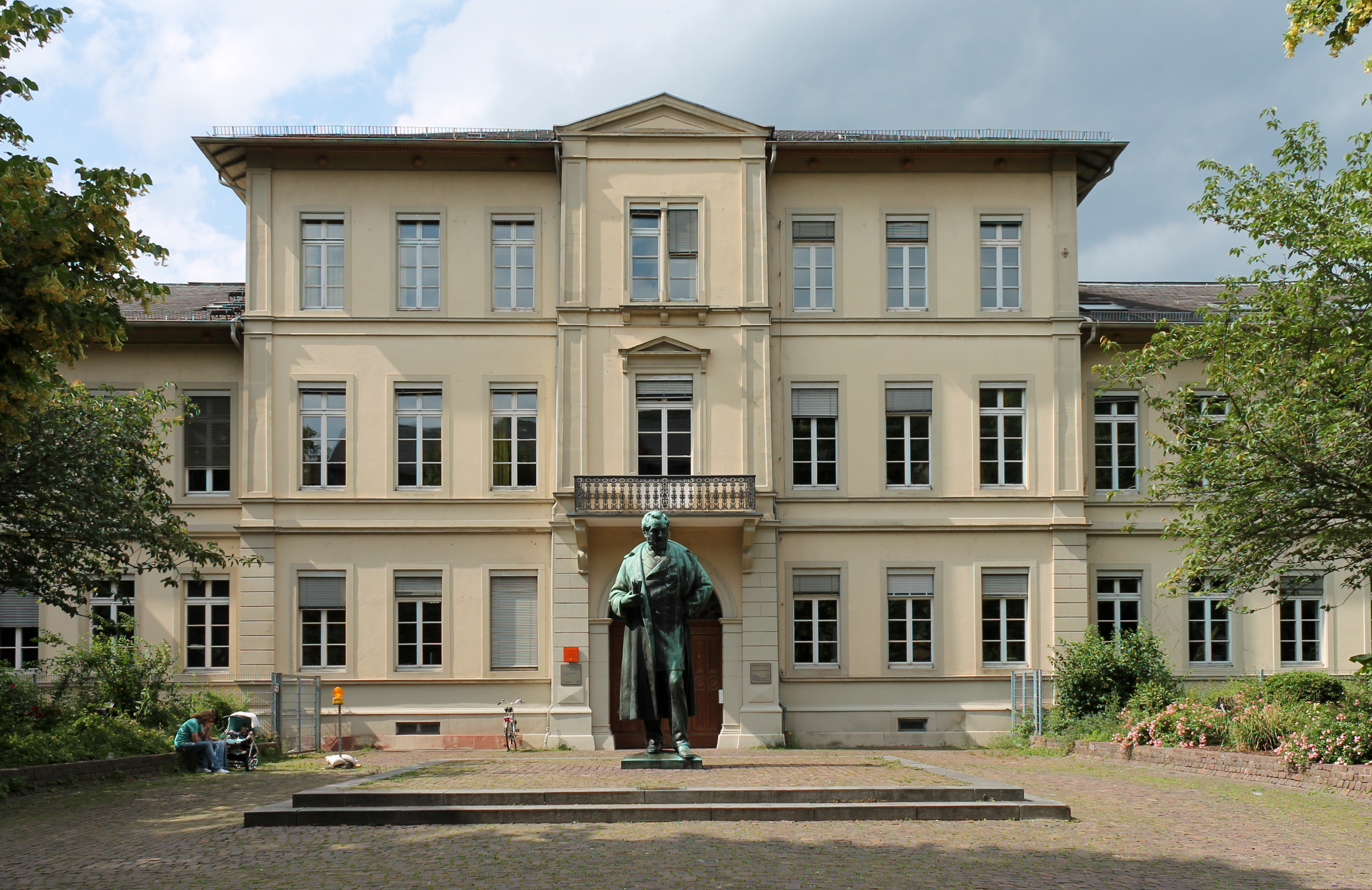
Fridericianum constructed 1863 (Photo: 2012)

The Friedrichsbau, syn. Fridericianum, is a historic building at Hauptstrasse 47/49 in Heidelberg. The chateau-like three-wing property was built in 1863 for use by the Ruprecht-Karls-University Heidelberg and is located in the immediate vicinity of the Old Anatomy. Today it houses the Psychological Institute of the University of Heidelberg.

== History ==
The Friedrichsbau was built between 1862 and 1863. The execution goes back to the district building inspector Wilhelm Waag. The building was erected on the site of the former Dominican monastery, which was bought in 1804 by Grand Duke Karl Karl Friedrich von Baden. The building is also named after the Grand Duke. The representative building reflects the increased importance that was attached to the natural sciences at that time.

Initially, the Institutes of Physics, Mineralogy, Mathematics, Technology and Physiology were located here. Later, the upper floors also served as official apartments for professors from the University of Heidelberg and their families. Famous physicists like Hermann von Helmholtz and Gustav Robert Kirchhoff lived here.

== Architecture ==
The three-storey Friedericianum is built in a simple late classicist style as an open three-wing complex. The first plans from 1847 show an expansion of the institute to the neighboring anatomy, but this was postponed for cost reasons. 1859 plans resumed at the urging of Hermann von Helmholtz. The three-part building, completed in 1863, with the green courtyard of honor facing the main street, is closely based on the designs originally created by Heinrich Hübsch. The round-arched main portal is emphasized on the 1st floor by a representative stone balcony. The manorially designed complex also corresponds to the classicist architectural style on the inside.

== Bibliography ==
- Melanie Mertens, State Office for the Preservation of Monuments (editor): "Monument topography of the Federal Republic of Germany, cultural monuments in Baden-Württemberg, Vol. II.5.1, Stadtkreis Heidelberg." Thorbecke-Verlag, Ostfildern, 2013, p. 282 ff. ISBN 978- 3-7995-0426-3
- Rudolf Schuler (photos), Richard Henk (text): Heidelberg. Edition Braus, Heidelberg 1990, ISBN 3-921524-46-6.
- Günter Heinemann: Heidelberg: Verlag Brigitte Gunderjahn, 3rd edition, 1996, pp. 412–415.
