= Universitätsplatz, Heidelberg =

Square in Heidelberg, Germany

Coordinates: 49°24′39″N 8°42′23″E

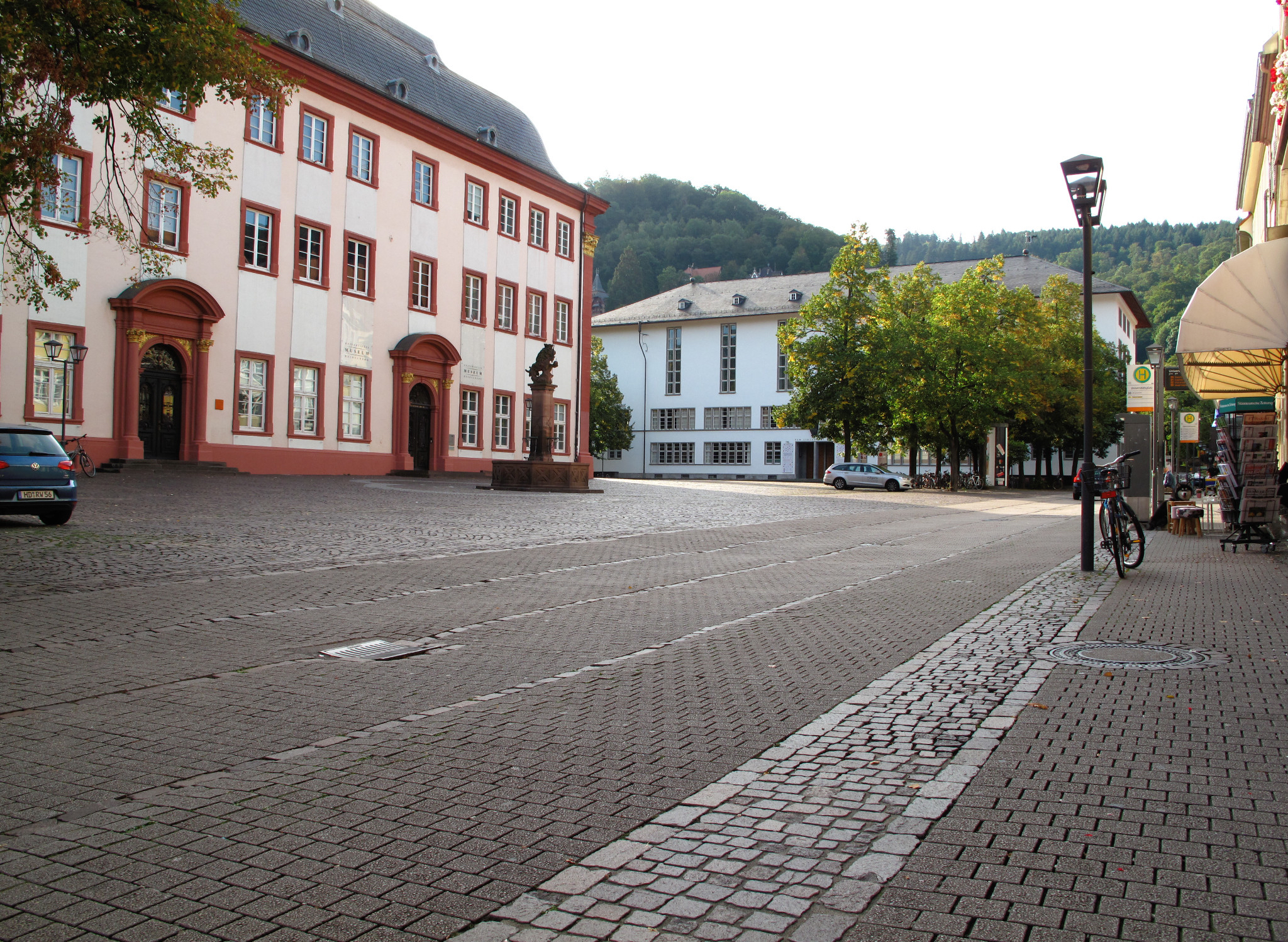
Universitätsplatz, seen from the northwest

The Universitätsplatz ("University square"), previously known as Paradeplatz, Ludwigsplatz, and Langemarckplatz (1937-1945) is an open square in Heidelberg's old town, the Altstadt. The Hauptstrasse runs along the north side, the west side is marked by Grabengasse, which follows the line of the original city walls. The east and south sides are bordered by buildings of the University, which gives the square its name.

== Description ==
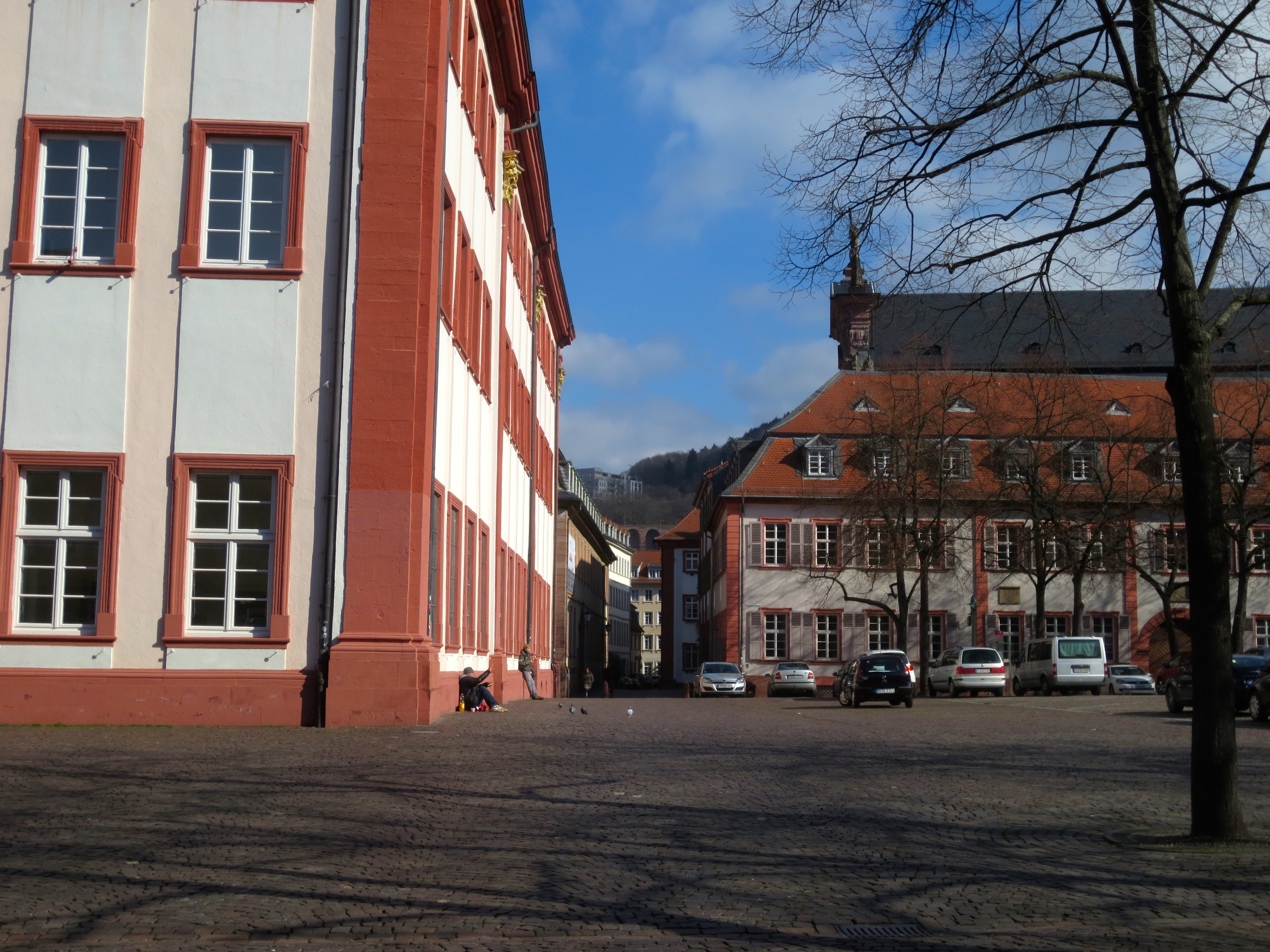
View from the west

The square is paved. There are two rectangular plantings of trees and several advertising columns. Commemorative plates for the Heidelberg Disputation and the 1933 book burnings are inlaid in the paving.

In the north is the Old University building, which was built between 1712 and 1735. Opposite it on the south side of the square is the New University building, which was erected in place of the "College house" in the 1930s.

In front of the main door of the Old University is the Lion fountain, which once played an important role in the city's water supply. It probably dates to the early modern period and is crowned by a lion, the heraldic animal of Electoral Palatinate.

The bus stop on Universitätsplatz is the central stop of the city and is an important node of the transport system, especially for students, but also for tourists, who can use it to reach many tourist attractions quickly. In summer, the surrounding restaurants usually form a kind of street cafe. The square is regularly used for events like the Heidelberg Literature Day and the Christmas markets.

== History ==
An Augustinian monastery was located on the site of the square in the Middle Ages. It is mentioned for the first time in 1279. In 1518, Martin Luther stayed at this monastery and defended his theses publicly in the Heidelberg Disputation. After the conversion of Elector Frederick III to Calvinism and the Reformation of Electoral Palatinate, the monastery was abolished and converted into a college. In 1693, during the War of the Palatine Succession, the buildings were destroyed and not rebuilt. At the beginning of the eighteenth century, the ruins of the monastery were levelled to a height of 1.7 m high, the rooms were filled in, and the square was levelled out. Elector Charles Theodore bought the land in 1753 and had it converted into a square for military exercises, giving it the name Paradeplatz (Parade square"). From around 1830, it was known as Ludwigplatz, after Grand Duke Louis I.

In 1901, a bronze equestrian statue of Emperor Wilhelm I was erected in the middle of the square. It was a copy of a standing statue made by Adolf von Donndorf for Stuttgart. It was removed on 4 May 1918 and melted down.

From 1928, the square was called Universitätsplatz. In 1937, at the request of the Reich student leader, the square was renamed Langemarckplatz, after the Langemarck myth. On 17 May and 16 July 1933, students burnt "Marxist and un-German writings" in the Universitätsplatz. From 1945, the square was once again called Universitätsplatz. In 1978, it and the Hauptstrasse were converted into a pedestrian zone.

== Gallery ==
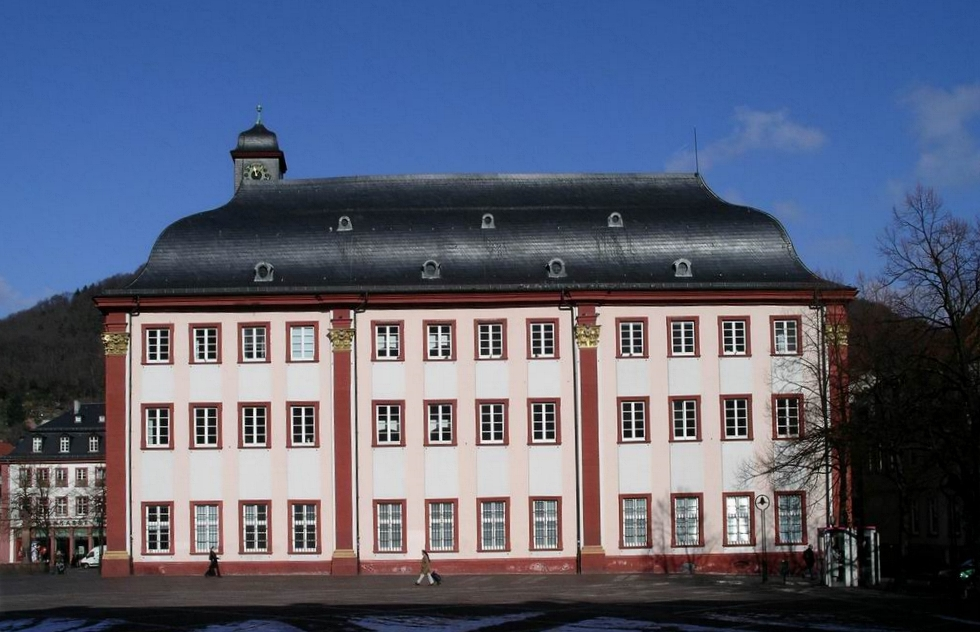
Old University

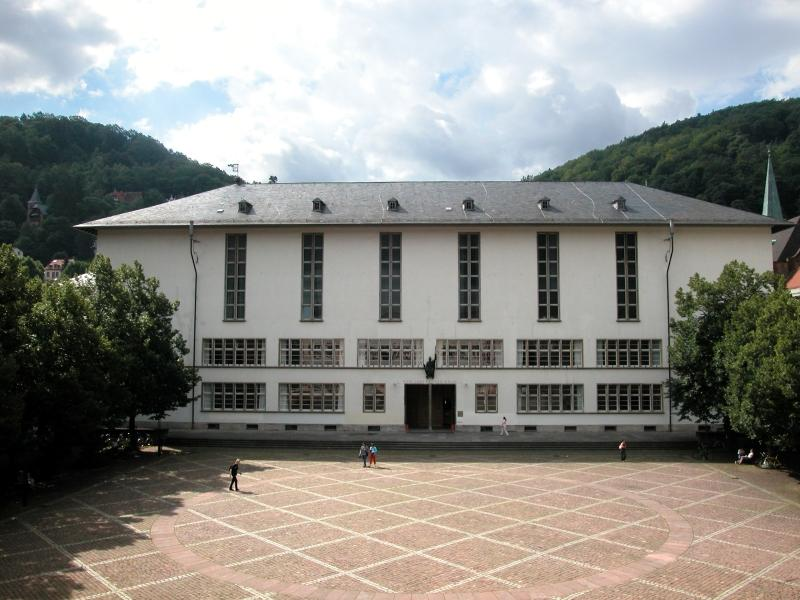
New University

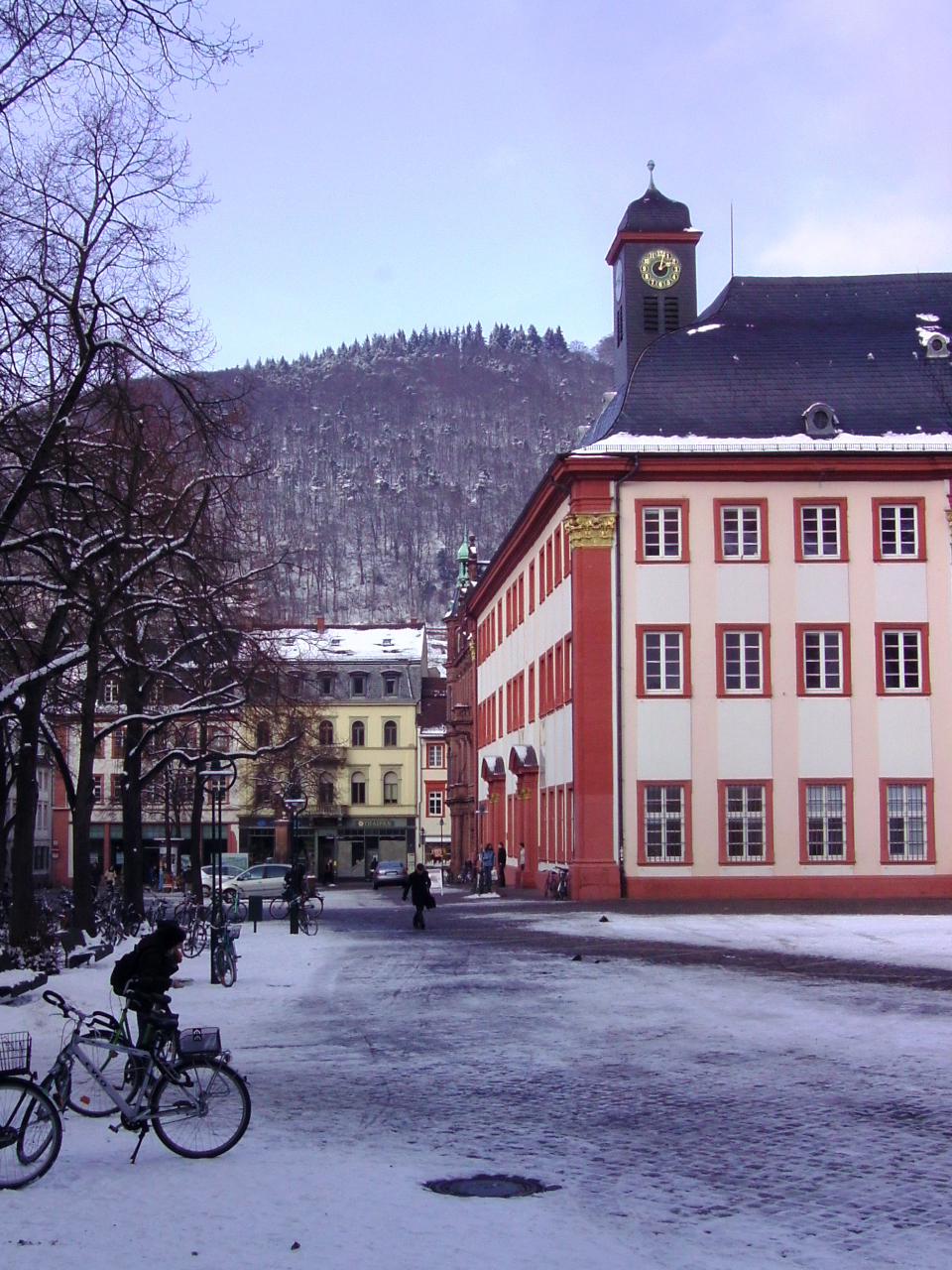
View looking north towards the Hauptstrasse

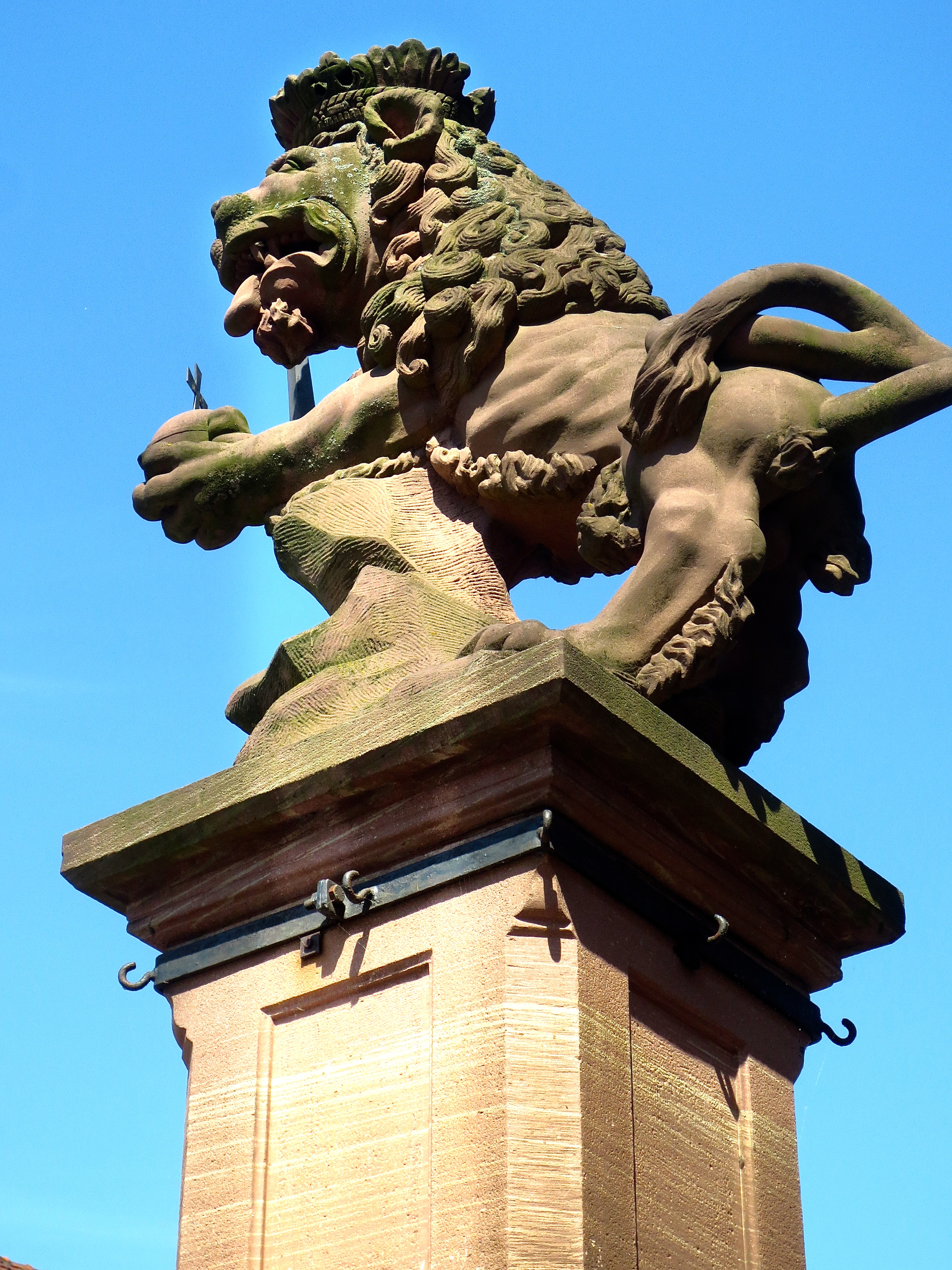
Lion fountain

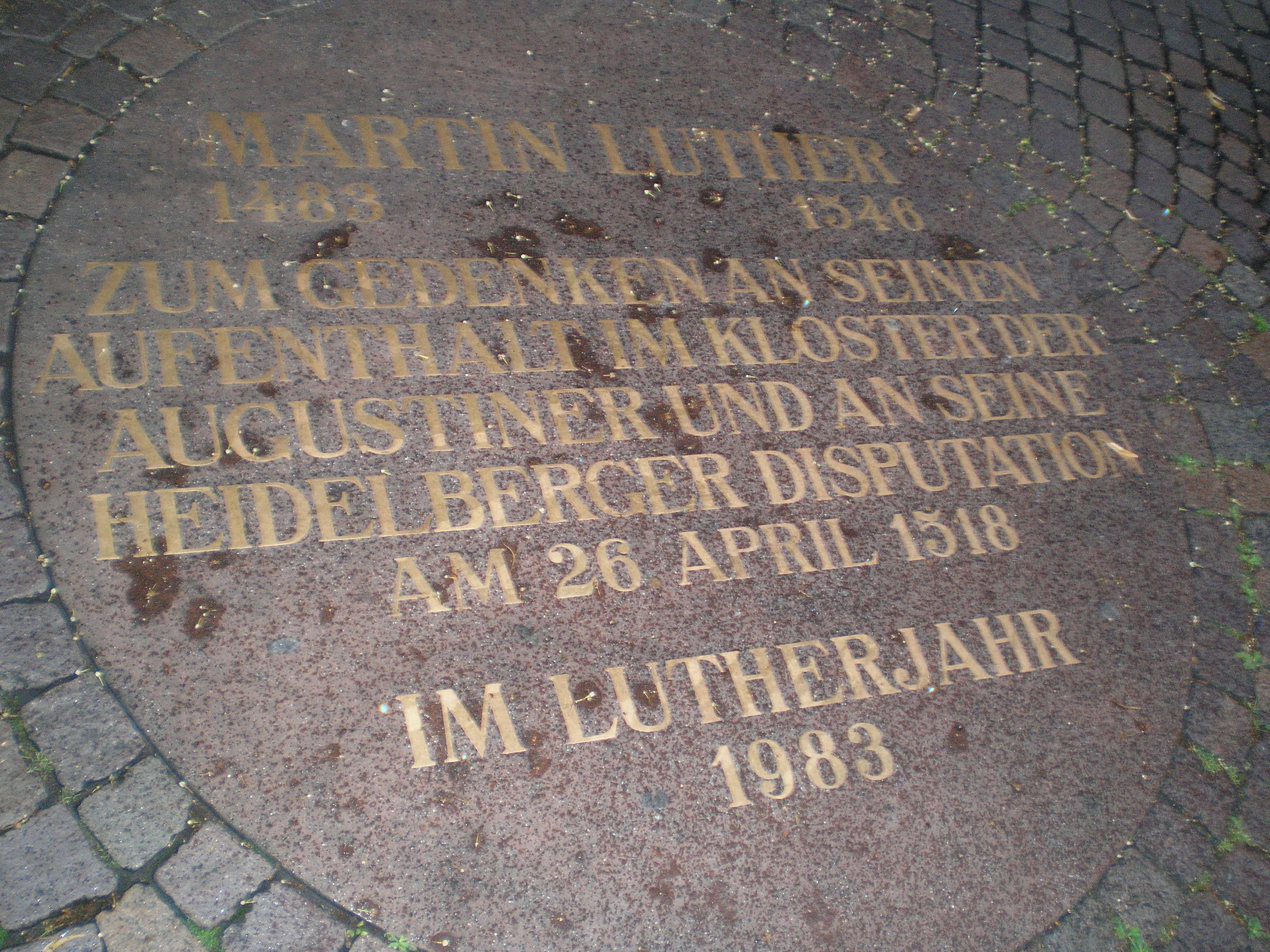
Commemorative plaque for Luther

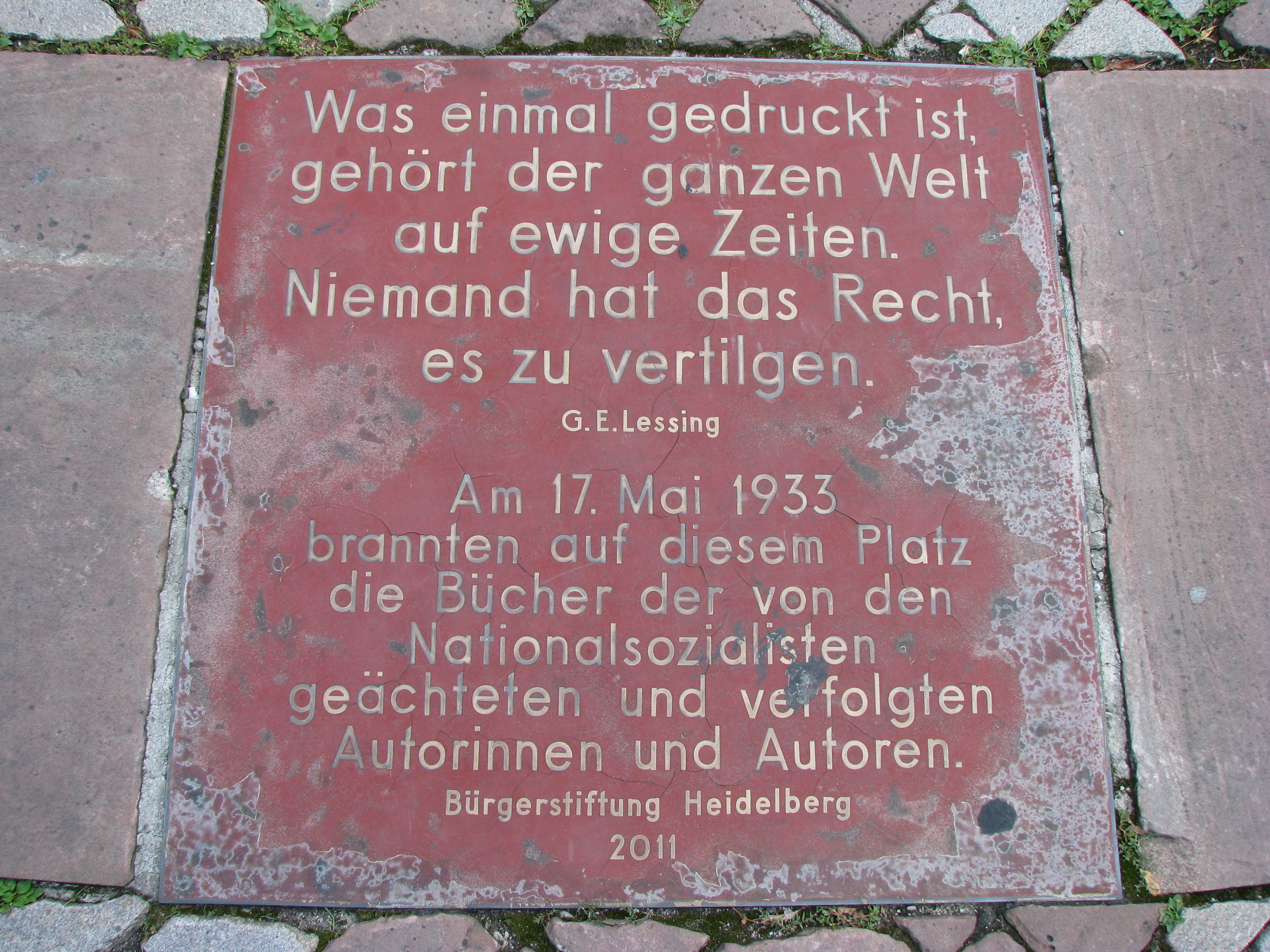
Commemorative plaque for the 1933 book burnings

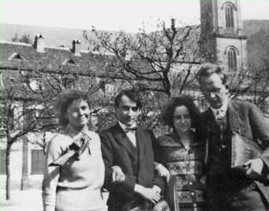
Hugo Friedrich; Hannah Arendt; Benno von Wiese (1928)
