= Marktplatz, Heidelberg =

Public square in Heidelberg, Germany

Coordinates: 49°24′44″N 8°42′37″E

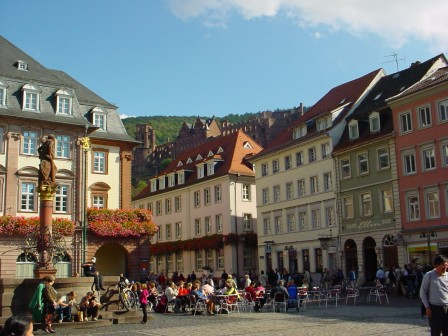
The Marktplatz, seen from the Church of the Holy Spirit. The Town Hall is visible at left, and Heidelberg Castle in the background at centre.

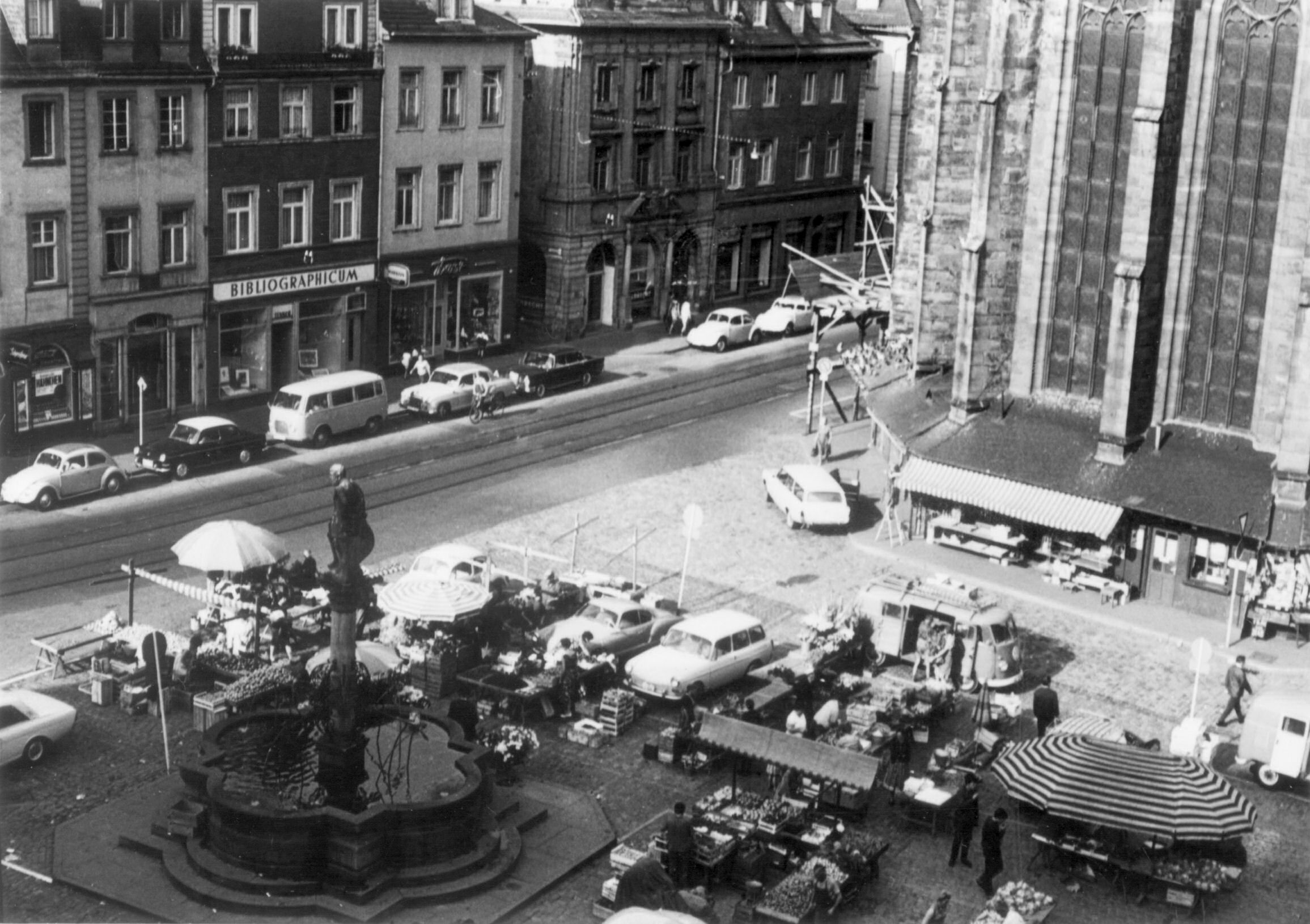
The Marktplatz in 1965, when still open to cars and trams.

The Marktplatz (German for Marketplace) is a central square in Heidelberg's old town, the Altstadt. It has served as a marketplace since the establishment of the city in medieval times. The Hauptstrasse runs along one side and the Church of the Holy Spirit and the Town Hall are located on the square.

== Description and history ==
The Marktplatz is the oldest square in the city and has served as a marketplace since the city was established. The Hauptstrasse runs along the southern edge of the square and Heiliggeiststrasse along the northern edge. At the eastern end of the Marktplatz is the Town Hall and the Church of the Holy Spirit dominates the western part of the square. The Hercules fountain, which stands in the centre of the square, commemorates the enormous efforts to rebuild the city after it was sacked in the War of the Palatine Succession.

In previous centuries the Marktplatz also served as the site of public trials and executions, including the theologian Johann Sylvan in 1572, and the thieves Hölzerlips and Mannefriedrich in 1812.

The Martplatz was also used as a car park when the Hauptstrasse was still open to vehicle traffic, but since the end of the 1970s it is only accessible on foot. In winter, the Markplatz is usually used by the Christmas markets and it is lit up in pink after Advent Sunday for "Pink Monday," a queer holiday, along with the Universitätsplatz.
