= Meder =

Meder is a surname. Notable people with the surname include:

- Angela Meder, a German primatologist
- Anna Meder (1606–1649), a German printer
- Jamie Meder (born 1991), an American football player
- Johann Valentin Meder (1649–1719), a German composer
- Oskar Meder (1877–1944), a German entomologist
- Rebecca Meder (born 2002), a South African swimmer
- Robert J. Meder (1917–1943), a lieutenant in the United States Army Air Forces
- Alfreds Meders, a German-Latvian mathematician

== See also ==
- Medr, a Welsh education body.
- Medr, an Ethiopian deity, see Kingdom of Aksum § Religion.
- MŠK - Thermál Veľký Meder, a Slovak football club
- Veľký Meder, a town in Slovakia
- Meder House, a protected baroque building in Germany
- Lew M. Meder House, a historic house in Nevada, United States
