= List of universities in Wales =

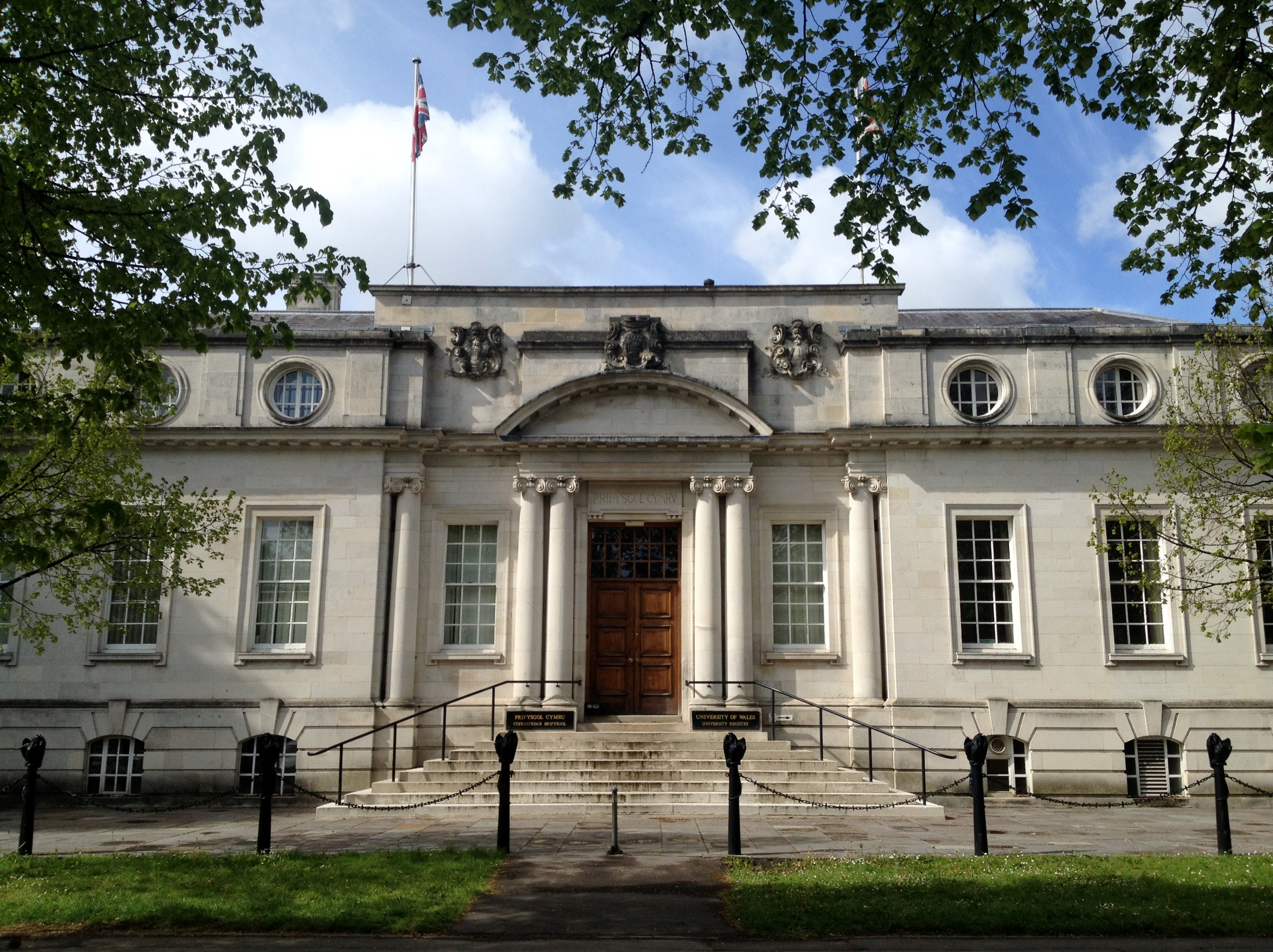
The University of Wales registry building in Cathays Park, Cardiff

Map showing the locations of the eight campus-based universities in Wales. (The Open University is mainly online, without a campus in Wales).

As of July 2025, there are nine universities providing higher education in Wales. Eight are campus-based: Aberystwyth, Bangor, Cardiff, Cardiff Metropolitan, University of South Wales, Swansea, University of Wales Trinity Saint David, and Wrexham; as well as the UK-wide Open University in Wales. Higher education institutions receive funding from Medr, which replaced the Higher Education Funding Council for Wales (HEFCW).

University status in Wales only requires taught degree awarding powers (since 2004). Welsh universities have the power to award both taught and research degrees. University status in Wales is conferred by the Privy Council following advice from the Quality Assurance Agency for Higher Education. The criteria for university status were set by the UK government in 2004; since then higher education in Wales has become a devolved matter under the Government of Wales Act 2006 and is the responsibility of the Cabinet Secretary for Education in the Welsh Government.

In 2025–26 global rankings, three Welsh universities (Bangor, Cardiff and Swansea) featured in all three of the major global rankings: the Academic Ranking of World Universities, the QS World University Rankings, and the Times Higher Education World University Rankings. No Welsh university features in the top 100 of any of the global tables, although Cardiff makes the top 300 in all three and also places within the top 40 universities of all three major domestic rankings.

All Welsh universities are public universities and funded in part by the Welsh Government, previously by HEFCW (now Medr), with an allocation of just over £217 million in 2022-23. Welsh universities also charge tuition fees capped at £9,000 per year for UK students, unlike other parts of the UK which have fees capped at £9,250, on undergraduate courses. In the 2023–24 academic year, approximately 150,700 students studied at universities or institutes of higher education in Wales. Included in the figure are 68,900 students normally domiciled in Wales, 52,100 from the rest of the United Kingdom and a further 27,800 international students. Welsh universities generate over £5.3 billion for the Welsh economy, for the financial year 2019/2020.

== Universities ==
English name	Welsh Name	Image	Year of foundation	Location	Total HE students (2024/25)	Academic staff (2024/25)	Teaching Excellence Framework	Notes
Aberystwyth University	Prifysgol Aberystwyth		1872	Aberystwyth	8,970	690	Gold	Founded as the University College Wales
Bangor University	Prifysgol Bangor		1884	Bangor	9,935	975	Gold	Founded as the University College of North Wales
Cardiff University	Prifysgol Caerdydd		1883	Cardiff	31,505	3,880	Silver	Founded as the University College of South Wales and Monmouthshire. Merged in 1988 with the University of Wales Institute of Science and Technology. Merged in 2004 with the University of Wales College of Medicine.
Cardiff Metropolitan University	Prifysgol Fetropolitan Caerdydd		2011 (origins 1865)	Cardiff	12,265	880	Silver	Founded as the South Glamorgan Institute of Higher Education in 1976, formed from the merger of four earlier institutes including the Cardiff School of Art & Design (1865).
University of South Wales	Prifysgol De Cymru		2013 (origins 1841)	Cardiff, Newport and Pontypridd	20,790	1,725	Did not enter	Formed by the merger of University of Wales, Newport (1975, with origins in 1841) and the University of Glamorgan (1992, with origins in 1913) in 2013. Also incorporates the Royal Welsh College of Music & Drama
Swansea University	Prifysgol Abertawe		1920	Swansea	18,985	1,735	Gold	Founded as the University College, Swansea
University of Wales Trinity Saint David	Prifysgol Cymru, Y Drindod Dewi Sant		2010 (origins 1822)	Cardiff, Carmarthen, Swansea Birmingham and London	15,415	940	Bronze	Formed in 2010 by the merger of University of Wales, Lampeter (1822), Trinity University College (1848) and Swansea Metropolitan University (2008, with origins in 1853)
Wrexham University	Prifysgol Wrecsam		1887	Wrexham, Northop, St Asaph	8,560	260	Silver	Founded as the Wrexham School of Science and Art and later became a university as Glyndŵr University.

== Funding and finances ==
The total consolidated annual income for Welsh universities for 2020–21 was £1.78 billion of which £230.0 million was from research grants and contracts, with an operating surplus of £74.2 million. £332.2 million was received from the Higher Education Funding Council for Wales via grants and £356.7 million was received from tuition fees of Home-domiciled students. The table below is a record of each university's financial data for the 2020–21 financial year as recorded by the Higher Education Statistics Agency:

University	Government funding body grants (£m)	Funding Body income as % of total income	Home-Domiciled Teaching income (£m)	Overall Teaching income (£m)	Teaching income as % of total income	Research income (£m)	Research income as % of total income	Total income (£m)	Operating surplus (£m)	Surplus as % of total income
Aberystwyth University	22.1	18.6%	16.0	54.0	45.4%	20.2	17.0%	118.8	—2.0	—1.70%
Bangor University	30.3	19.8%	27.6	75.8	49.4%	23.4	15.2%	153.4	—1.5	—1.01%
Cardiff University	109.5	18.1%	66.6	306.9	50.8%	112.6	18.6%	604.6	31.4	5.19%
Cardiff Metropolitan University	14.8	12.1%	42.3	90.2	73.8%	2.4	2.0%	122.3	2.9	2.34%
University of South Wales	32.7	16.3%	77.1	140.0	69.9%	7.5	3.8%	200.2	5.8	2.89%
Swansea University	50.4	14.0%	66.8	184.3	51.1%	62.1	17.2%	360.8	27.8	7.72%
University of Wales Trinity Saint David	63.3	36.4%	40.1	87.0	50.0%	0.6	0.4%	173.9	8.2	4.72%
Wrexham University	9.2	19.6%	20.1	31.6	67.2%	1.1	2.4%	47.1	1.7	3.68%

== Research Excellence Framework ==
The below lists the outcome of the latest Research Excellence Framework undertaken in 2021 (the next REF is scheduled for 2028) by the four UK higher education funding bodies. The quality of research was rated 4* (world leading), 3* (internationally excellent), 2* (recognised internationally), 1* (recognised nationally) and unclassified. GPA measures the quality of research and Research Power is calculated by the GPA score of a university multiplied by the full-time equivalent number of researchers submitted. The rankings are out of 129 institutions across the UK:

	Quality profile %						
University	4*	3*	2*	1*	Unclassified	GPA ranking	Research Power ranking
Aberystwyth University	26	50	22	2	0	65	76
Bangor University	40	45	13	2	0	42	77
Cardiff University	45	45	9	1	0	22	14
Cardiff Metropolitan University	20	50	26	5	0	81	99
University of South Wales	16	45	30	6	3	101	95
Swansea University	35	51	14	0	0	48	41
University of Wales Trinity Saint David	15	34	37	12	2	112	117
Wrexham University	6	30	44	19	2	123	129

== Rankings ==
The following table is a list of Welsh universities by their performance in the three main domestic and three main global university rankings.

University	Complete 2027 (National)	Guardian 2026 (National)	Times/Sunday Times 2026 (National)	ARWU 2025 (Global)	QS 2027 (Global)	THE 2026 (Global)
Aberystwyth University	56	62	42	—	801–850	601–800
Bangor University	49	62	59	601–700	567=	501–600
Cardiff University	27=	37	28=	201–300	179=	201–250
Cardiff Metropolitan University	72=	87	71	—	—	1001–1200
University of South Wales	91	43	82	—	1201–1400	1201–1500
Swansea University	41	32	37	701–800	322=	301–350
University of Wales Trinity Saint David	98=	73	99	—	—	—
Wrexham University	130	111	122	—	—	—

== See also ==
- Armorial of UK universities
- Education in Wales
- List of further education colleges in Wales
- History of higher education in Wales
