= IBW =

IBW may refer to:

- Ideal body weight
- Impact Based Warning, issued by the National Weather Service
- Institute of the Black World (1969–83), a think tank based in Atlanta, Georgia
- International Business Wales
- I.B.W., a 1989 album by Japanese rock band Bakufu Slump
