= Funding Council =

Funding Council may refer to:

- Higher Education Funding Council for England, a public body of the Department for Business, Innovation and Skills in the United Kingdom
- Higher Education Funding Council for Wales, an intermediary body in Wales
- Scottish Funding Council, the body in Scotland that distributes funding from the Scottish Executive to the country's colleges
