= Welsh Government sponsored body =

Non-departmental public bodies sponsored by the Welsh Government

A Welsh Government sponsored body (WGSB) (Note: Welsh: Corff (Note: pl. Cyrff) a Noddir gan Lywodraeth Cymru (CNLC)) is a non-departmental public body directly funded by the Welsh Government. Under the Government of Wales Act 1998 the bodies were sponsored by the National Assembly for Wales and were known as an Assembly sponsored public body, and this was changed by the Schedule 3 of the Wales Act 2017 which amended the Government of Wales Act 2006.

Welsh Government sponsored bodies undertake various functions on behalf of the Welsh Ministers, but operate independently of the Welsh Government. Corporate governance is performed by a chair and board for each sponsored body, who are appointed by Welsh ministers, in accordance with governance code established by the Commissioner for Public Appointments. The role and governance of sponsored bodies was stated by Ken Skates (Cabinet Secretary for Economy and Infrastructure), in a written statement to the National Assembly,

Sponsored bodies have expertise and experience in specialist areas, and are valued partners who support and contribute towards many Welsh Government strategic initiatives and programmes. In terms of governance, they have separate Chairs and Boards appointed in accordance with the Code of Practice for Ministerial Appointments to Public Bodies.

— Ken Skates, Welsh Government relationship with sponsored bodies

Sponsored bodies are subject to the Freedom of Information Act 2000, under Section 83, and have been given guidance by the Information Commissioner's Office on how they should exercise this responsibility.

== List of public bodies ==
This is a list of bodies connected to the Welsh Government.

=== Executive WGSBs ===
- Audit Wales
- Public Services Ombudsman for Wales
- Corporate Services and Inspectorates
  - Agricultural Land Tribunal for Wales
  - Care Inspectorate Wales
  - Centre for Digital Public Services
  - Education Tribunal for Wales
  - Future Generations Commissioner for Wales
  - Healthcare Inspectorate Wales
  - Valuation Tribunal for Wales
  - Welsh Revenue Authority
- Education, Culture and Welsh Language
  - Adnodd Cyf
  - Amgueddfa Cymru – Museum Wales
  - Cadw
  - Careers Wales
  - Education Workforce Council
  - National Academy for Educational Leadership
  - National Library of Wales
  - Planning and Environment Decisions Wales
  - Estyn
  - Qualifications Wales
  - Student Finance Wales
  - Third Sector Partnership Council
  - Welsh Language Commissioner
- Health, Social Care and Early Years
  - NHS Wales
    - All Wales Therapeutics and Toxicology Centre
    - Public Health Wales
    - Welsh Ambulance Service
    - NHS Wales Executive
    - NHS Wales Joint Commissioning Committee
    - Shared Services Partnership
    - Regional boards
      - Aneurin Bevan University Health Board
      - Betsi Cadwaladr University Health Board
      - Cardiff and Vale University Health Board
      - Cwm Taf Morgannwg University Health Board
      - Hywel Dda University Health Board
      - Powys Teaching Health Board
      - Swansea Bay University Health Board
  - Cafcass Cymru
  - Digital Health and Care Wales
  - Health Education and Improvement Wales
  - Higher Education Funding Council for Wales (replaced by Medr)
  - Llais (Wales)
  - Older People's Commissioner for Wales
  - Prison Health and Social Care National Oversight Group
  - Social Care Wales
- Local Government, Housing, Climate Change and Rural Affairs
  - Design Commission for Wales
  - Independent Remuneration Panel for Wales
  - Meat Promotion Wales
  - Democracy and Boundary Commission Cymru
  - National Adviser for Violence against Women and other forms of Gender-based Violence, Domestic Abuse and Sexual Violence
  - Natural Resources Wales
  - Sport Wales
  - Cardiff Airport
- Economy, Energy and Transport
  - Cwmni Egino
  - Development Bank of Wales
  - Global Centre for Rail Excellence
  - Industry Wales
  - International Business Wales
  - Residential Property Tribunal Wales
  - Transport for Wales
  - Trydan Gwyrdd Cymru
  - Residential Property Tribunal Wales

==== Former executive WGSBs ====
These organisations have now been integrated into their respective departments.

- ELWa – The National Council for Education and Training for Wales
- Health Professions Wales
- Qualifications, Curriculum and Assessment Authority for Wales
- Wales Tourist Board
- Welsh Development Agency
- Welsh Language Board

=== Advisory WGSBs ===
- Agricultural Dwelling House Advisory Committee
- All Wales Medicines Strategy Group
- Ancient Monuments Board for Wales
- Historic Buildings Council for Wales
- Local Government Boundary Commission for Wales
- Social Services Inspectorate for Wales Advisory Group
- Welsh Centre for Post-Graduate Pharmaceutical Education
- Welsh Dental Committee
- Welsh Industrial Development Advisory Board
- Welsh Medical Committee
- Welsh Nursing and Midwifery Committee
- Welsh Optometric Committee
- Welsh Pharmaceutical Committee
- Welsh Scientific Advisory Committee

=== Tribunals ===
- Adjudication Panel Wales
- Agricultural Land Tribunal (Wales)
- Mental Health Review Tribunal for Wales
- Registered Inspectors of Schools Appeals Tribunal for Wales
- Registered Nursery Education Inspectors Appeal Tribunal
- Residential Property Tribunal Wales
- Rent Assessment Panel for Wales
- Special Educational Needs Tribunal
- Valuation Tribunal for Wales
- Welsh Language Tribunal

== Other bodies funded by the Welsh Government ==
Fire and Rescue Authorities

- Mid and West Wales Fire and Rescue Authority
- North Wales Fire and Rescue Authority
- South Wales Fire and Rescue Authority

National Park Authorities

- Eryri National Park Authority
- Bannau Brycheiniog National Park Authority
- Pembrokeshire Coast National Park Authority

Principal councils

- Blaenau Gwent County Borough Council
- Bridgend County Borough Council
- Caerphilly County Borough Council
- Cardiff Council
- Carmarthenshire County Council
- Conwy County Borough Council
- Denbighshire County Council
- Flintshire County Council
- Isle of Anglesey County Council
- Monmouthshire County Council
- Merthyr Tydfil County Borough Council
- Neath Port Talbot County Borough Council
- Newport City Council
- Pembrokeshire County Council
- Powys County Council
- Rhondda Cynon Taf County Borough Council
- City and County of Swansea Council
- Torfaen County Borough Council
- Vale of Glamorgan Council
- Wrexham County Borough Council
