= Curriculum Council for Wales =

Defunct Welsh education statutory body

The Curriculum Council for Wales (CCW) was a statutory body for education that was established in Wales in August 1988 under the Education Reform Act 1988.

The CCW was replaced in 1994 by the Curriculum and Assessment Authority for Wales, which in 1997 was itself superseded by the Qualifications, Curriculum and Assessment Authority for Wales.

== Functions ==
The CCW was responsible for all aspects of the National Curriculum in Wales, covering age ranges from under-fives up to 16–19 years.

The CCW's functions were to advise the Secretary of State for Wales on all matters relating to the National Curriculum for Wales; to publish and disseminate information on curriculum matters to schools and other interested parties; and to advise and assist the Secretary of State in any programme of research into the national curriculum.

== History ==
Before 1988, curriculum matters in Wales were dealt with by specific Welsh sub-committees of the School Curriculum Development Committee, and by the Secondary Examinations Council. The CCW was financed by grant-in-aid provided by the Welsh Office.

In April 1994, under the Education Act 1993, CCW became the Awdurdod Cwricwlwm ac Asesu Cymru (Curriculum and Assessment Authority for Wales). The Authority inherited all the CCW functions. .In addition, it also became responsible for ensuring quality of the general and vocational qualifications, and to support the teaching of Welsh language and other subjects through the medium of Welsh. Responsibility for the teaching of other subjects passed to the Authority in 1995.

== Current authority ==
In 1997, the Curriculum and Assessment Authority for Wales was taken over by the Qualifications, Curriculum and Assessment Authority for Wales. Set up under the Education Act 1997, the new authority took over responsibility for the accreditation of all vocational qualifications in Wales except for National Vocational Qualifications (NVQs). This function was shared with the Qualifications and Curriculum Authority, which reserved the right to make formal accreditation of NVQs.
