= Secondary education in Wales =

Secondary education in Wales covers the period between the ages of 11 and 15 by 31 August. In this period a child's education is divided into two main stages of the National Curriculum: Key Stages 3 and 4.

== Stages ==
Key Stage 3 includes years 7,8, and 9

- Year 7, old First Form, age 11 by 31 August
- Year 8, old Second Form, age 12 by 31 August
- Year 9, old Third Form, age 13 by 31 August (End of Key Stage Three Tests and Tasks)

Key Stage 4 includes years 10 and 11

- Year 10, old Fourth Form, age 14 by 31 August
- Year 11, old Fifth Form, age 15 by 31 August (old O Level examinations, modern GCSE examinations)

Secondary schools in Wales must, by law, teach the basic and the National Curriculum to their pupils. The basic curriculum consists of religious education, sex education, personal and social education, and for 14– to 16-year-olds, work-related education. Schools must also provide careers education and guidance for all 13-16-year-olds.

At Key Stage 3, the National Curriculum consists of the "core subjects" of English and Welsh, mathematics and science, and the "non-core subjects" of Welsh second language, modern foreign languages, design and technology, information technology, history, geography, art, music, physical education and religious education.

At Key Stage 4, only five National Curriculum subjects are mandatory (English, Welsh or Welsh second language, mathematics, science, and physical education) and schools have greater flexibility to provide optional subjects that meet the needs and interests of their pupils. The majority of learners at this key stage follow courses leading to external qualifications, principally GCSEs.

== Assessment ==
Regular and systematic assessment of a pupil's ongoing progress throughout compulsory schooling is an essential complement to the National Curriculum. Its primary purpose is to provide a clear picture of what pupils have achieved against individual subject attainment standards by the end of three key stages of a pupil's school life i.e. broadly ages 6–7, 10–11 and 13–14. The respective assessments were based on a rising scale (Levels 1 to 8, and then Exceptional Performance) of achievement.

For 6–7 year olds (Key Stage 1) the general expectation is that the majority of pupils will attain Level 2 in each individual subject. For 10–11-year-olds (Key Stage 2) the expectation is that the majority of pupils will attain Level 4 in each individual subject. For 13–14-year-olds (Key Stage3) the general expectation is that the majority of pupils will attain Level 5 in each individual subject.

The system of statutory national key-stage tests in Wales was, until 2000, the same as in England, and was managed by the School Curriculum and Assessment Authority (SCAA). In 2000, the National Assembly for Wales took responsibility for these tests in Wales, at which point they were developed by test agencies on behalf of ACCAC, whilst the tests in England were developed for the QCA.

In July 2001 the Minister for Education and Lifelong Learning in Wales announced that secondary school league tables would no longer be published, arguing that they did not have the support of either teachers or parents. This reform has created a significant policy difference with England.

In 2002, the Welsh Assembly decided to stop the tests at Key Stage One. Instead, optional teacher-assessment materials were provided to schools in 2003 for use in English, mathematics, and Welsh. These had been adapted from materials that had originally been developed by the National Foundation for Educational Research (NFER) and the other test agencies to be used as statutory assessment materials for 2003. At the end of 2003, the Daugherty Report was commissioned by the Welsh Assembly to undertake a review of the country's assessment procedures. Following the outcome of the Daugherty Assessment review Group in 2004, Key Stage 2 task/tests were made optional in 2005 and Key Stage 3 tasks/tests were made optional in 2006. Only results for teacher assessments were published from 2006 onwards.

In 2003, the Welsh Baccalaureate Qualification was piloted at Key Stage 5/6. Subsequently, Welsh Baccalaureate programmes have been introduced for study at three levels, Foundation, Intermediate or Advanced between ages 14–19 years.

== Performance ==
In 2013, Angela Burns, Welsh education spokesperson for the Conservative Party, said, "We've failed in our international rankings, our pupils are consistently at the bottom of the tables. There may have been improvements but we're dropping behind the rest of the UK and Europe." Paul Murphy, previously Welsh Secretary, suggested that factors preventing Welsh pupils gaining entry to top UK universities included poor perception of the Welsh Baccalaureate, and a lack of ambition among teachers. The BBC reported that an admissions officer for Oxford University raised concerns about "a number of factors, including a reluctance by some schools to encourage pupils to leave Wales, particularly Welsh medium schools". The Welsh government commented that the Welsh Baccalaureate would be revised to deal with the issues, and that Murphy's new role was intended to encourage pupils to aim high. David Evans from the trade union NUT Cymru said, "I think that every teacher wants to do the best by their pupils in all circumstances."
