= GO Wales =

Welsh employability and business support project

The GO Wales project (Graduate Opportunities Wales) was an employability and business support project in Wales. It was managed by the Higher Education Funding Council for Wales (HEFCW), delivered in partnership with all higher education institutions in Wales and funded by the Welsh Assembly Government, with additional funding from the European Social Fund of the European Union.

== Background ==
The project started in April 2003 from an amalgamation of the Cymru Prosper Wales work placement scheme, the Graduate Wales project with additional services.

== Services ==
- Work placements: a short-term period of project-based employment organised and monitored by GO Wales staff. The employee is a higher education student or a graduate and the employer is a business based in Wales, normally an SME (small to medium-sized enterprise). All candidates offered the opportunity to gain a City & Guilds Professional Development Award during their work placement.
- GO Wales Jobs: a web-based service advertising graduate-level jobs in Wales. Companies can advertise their vacancies and job-seekers can search for jobs and apply online. Both advertising vacancies and applying for vacancies are free of charge.
- Graduate Training and Development Fund: Clients of this service are SMEs. These companies may not have the resources available to larger companies for staff development and training. Small businesses in Wales can access a training fund which is designed to assist with the business-specific training and development costs of graduates in the organisation.
- Careers advice and informationvia information sheets and advisers from university careers services .

== Project completion ==
The GO Wales project ceased at the end of 2014 after European funding ran out. The Open University still refers to a "Go Wales" project through which "one-to-one coaching and mentoring" can be provided for Welsh students by the University's employability advisors.
