= Primary education in Wales =

Primary education in Wales has a similar structure to primary education in England, but teaching of the Welsh language is compulsory and it is used as the medium of instruction in many schools. The introduction of the Foundation Phase for 3- to 7-year-olds is also creating increasing divergence between Wales and England.

== Stages ==
In Wales, statutory education begins in the term after a child's fifth birthday, although many children start primary school earlier than this or their parents choose to home educate them.

Under the 2008 curriculum, between the ages of 3 and 11 a child's education was divided into two main stages:

- Foundation phase - (ages 3–7) (replacing Early Years (ages 3–5) and Key Stage 1 (ages 5–7)
- Key Stage 2 (ages 7–11).

Under the new curriculum, the key stages are replaced with "progression steps" with guidance of what level pupils are expected to reach at different ages. During the primary school years, these take place at age five, eight and eleven years old.

== Curriculum ==
Under the 2008 curriculum, schools were required to teach children in Key Stage 2 English, Welsh or Welsh as a second language, mathematics, science, design and technology, information and communication technology, history, geography, art and design, music and physical education. The foundation phase did not use traditional subjects instead dividing the curriculum into seven "areas of learning";

- Personal and Social Development, Well-Being and Cultural Diversity
- Language, Literacy and Communication Skills
- Mathematical Development
- Welsh Language Development
- Knowledge and Understanding of the World
- Physical Development
- Creative Development

The curriculum which is being formally introduced in primary schools in 2022 gives schools more freedom to decide what children are taught. Instruction is grouped into six different areas;

- Languages, Literacy and Communication
- Mathematics and Numeracy
- Science and Technology
- Health and Well-being
- Humanities
- Expressive Arts

The only specific subjects which all schools are obliged to teach are the English and Welsh languages along with;

- Literacy, numeracy, and digital competence
- Religion, values and ethics
- Relationships and sexuality education

== Assessment ==
Primary school league tables were abolished in Wales in 2001; a Bristol University study indicated that this had caused a fall in standards in about 75% of schools. Statutory testing for children finishing Key Stage 1 and 2 was introduced across England and Wales in 1989. It was abolished in 2002 and 2005 respectively. Being replaced with teacher assessments with limited oversight. In 2013, standardised testing was reintroduced for children in the later years of primary school in 2013.

== See also ==
- Education in Wales
- Home education in the United Kingdom
