= Education Otherwise =

Charity based in England

- Founded: 1976; 50 years ago
- Purpose: Education
- Region served: Primarily England and Wales
- Method: Support, lobbying, research
- Website: www.educationotherwise.org

Education Otherwise (EO) is British registered charity operating which aims to provide support and information for families whose children are being educated outside school. The organisation derived its name from section 36 of the Education Act 1944, which stated that parents are responsible for the education of their children, "either by regular attendance at school or otherwise."

== History ==
In 1972, Royston Lambert, head of Dartington Hall School, and Dick Kitto set up a project in conjunction with Northcliffe School to provide education for a group of non-academic students who would have to take another year in school due to the pending raising of the school leaving age. Kitto established a free school or democratic school model for the running of the project and was impressed by the qualities of the students even though they had effectively unschooled themselves within the school system, where they were perceived as trouble makers.

Original EO logo

Kitto's school caught the attention of Stan Windass, who had been working for a children's rights centre in London, through which he had become aware of several families who were educating their own children.

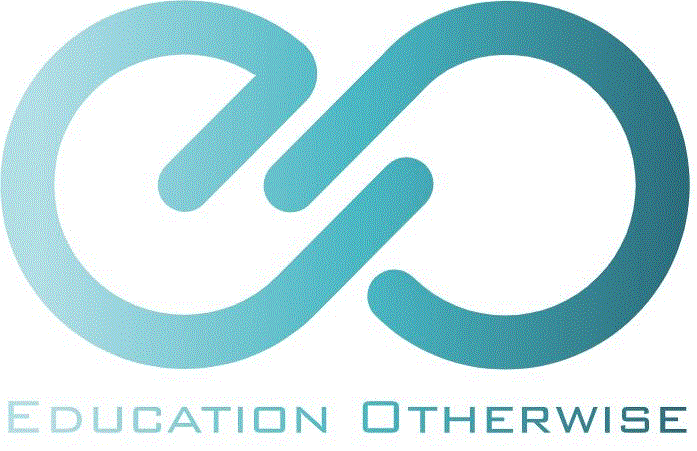
The updated and current logo, as of 2020

Kitto was familiar with ideas about unschooled education through reading John Holt and Joy Baker's Children in Chancery (Hutchinson, 1964. now out of print), together with his experiences at the Northcliffe School project. He and Windass were able to contact several families who were educating otherwise and arranged an informal network and occasional meetings, in 1975 - 1976 which is when Education Otherwise began.

On 3 February 1977, Granada Television broadcast a programme called "Opting Out" in their lunchtime series Parents Day which featured three Education Otherwise families. This resulted in around 200 enquiries and expanded the membership to over 50. In September 1976 the group was established on a more formal basis. In 1977, Kitto presented a BBC TV Open Door programme about the ideas behind the organisation. This resulted in over 2,000 enquiries and increased the membership to around 250.

Kitto's ethos could be summarised as: "...we have to ensure that education is not monolithic, centralized and directed from above but allows all sorts of different things to happen and all sorts of initiatives to be taken by pupils, children, parents and education authorities."

The original logo (based on a UK traffic sign) was intended to represent a child breaking out of the confines of school, and pointing toward a different way. In recent years the logo has been the subject of criticism, as it is viewed as divisive and the meaning misconstrued as a child "goose stepping". A modernisation and rebranding in 2020 has resulted in a new logo being designed through a design competition, which has a more modern and acceptable appearance.

== Parent's Charter ==
In 1991, the government introduced a Parent's Charter (subtitled: "You and Your Child's Education"), which promised parents reports about their children and their schools. In 1994, a revised version of the Parent's Charter (subtitled: Our Children's Education) was issued. Page 9 included the sentence: "You have a duty to make sure that your child goes to school until he or she is 16." Education Otherwise members were concerned that this misinformation should be corrected as it was being delivered to every household.

Education Otherwise appointed solicitor Peter Liell, who sent "Letters Before Action" notices to the Department for Education and to the Welsh Office. A reply by Eric Forth (9 July 1994) for the DfE claimed that the Parent's Charter could not be taken as a definitive guide to the law - the Charter "cannot take in every exception or reflect all points of detail". The department stated that there were no plans to issue a corrigendum. The Welsh Office response was a confirmation that the Charter for Parents in Wales had been revised and would reflect the fact that not all children were educated in schools.

The matter was raised by Don Foster in a Parliamentary Question, which was responded to by Robin Squire stating that John Patten, the Secretary of State for Education, saw no need to issue a correction or to make a statement about the mistake.

As English and Welsh education law are identical, there were no grounds for the variation in the responses of the two bodies. The solicitor notified the DfE that he had been instructed to prepare an application for leave to apply for judicial review of the decision as stated in Forth's letter. This threat caused an immediate response from the department that they "would want to find a different - in your eyes more satisfactory - wording for any further editions". The solicitor responded seeking confirmation, by 31 August 1994, that a future edition would include reference to the fact that children do not have to go to school. Forth once again responded accepting the need for a revised text: "I am, however, happy to confirm, in the light of your client's concerns, our intention that any future edition of the Parent's Charter in England will include a reference, be it explicit or implicit, to a parent's lawful right to ensure that his child is suitably educated otherwise than at school."

It was felt that this was as far as Education Otherwise could go with the matter and the application for judicial review was withdrawn. The whole process had cost Education Otherwise almost £4,000 but had generated a lot of publicity and raised awareness of the issue as many members had raised their concerns with their own MP.

== Collections ==
The Institute of Education, University College London holds the archives of the Harrison family and their fight to educate their children at home. Iris Harrison founded the Education Otherwise charity; the collection includes records relating to this work.

== See also ==
- Home education in the United Kingdom
- Deschooling
- Unschooling
- John Holt
- Leila Berg
- Ivan Illich particularly his Deschooling Society
- Schoolhouse - Charity covering Scotland
- Autodidacticism
- Holistic education
- Homeschooling
