= Environment Agency Wales =

Welsh Government sponsored body

- Welsh: Asiantaeth yr Amgylchedd Cymru

Welsh Government sponsored body overview
- Formed: 1996
- Dissolved: 31 March 2013
- Superseding Welsh Government sponsored body: Natural Resources Wales
- Jurisdiction: Wales, but also the English sections of: the River Dee; the River Wye; and not the Welsh sections of the River Severn
- Headquarters: Tŷ Cambria, Newport Road, Cardiff; 51°27′6.1″N 2°36′10.5″W
- Parent department: Environment Agency; Welsh Government
- Website: Environment Agency

Environment Agency Wales (Welsh: Asiantaeth yr Amgylchedd Cymru) was a Welsh Government sponsored body that was part of the Environment Agency of England and Wales from 1996 to 2013. Its principal aims were to protect and improve the environment in Wales and to promote sustainable development. On 1 April 2013 the organisation was merged with the Countryside Council for Wales and Forestry Commission Wales into a single environmental body, Natural Resources Wales.

It had an operational area defined along its Eastern boundary by the catchments of the River Dee and the River Wye. Those parts of the River Severn in Wales were managed by the Environment Agency whilst those parts of the River Dee and River Wye catchments that are in England were nevertheless managed by Environment Agency Wales. The agency also had a public facing boundary which corresponded to the political boundary of Wales.

== Role and responsibilities ==
Environment Agency Wales' role included: reducing industry's impacts on the environment, enforcing pollution legislation and reducing the harm caused by flooding and pollution incidents. It also oversaw the management of waste, water resources and freshwater fisheries; cleaning up rivers, coastal waters and contaminated land and improving wildlife habitats.

By influencing others to change attitudes and behaviour, it aimed to make the environment cleaner and healthier for people and wildlife.

== Priorities ==
=== Act to reduce climate change and its consequences ===
Environment Agency Wales managed the risk of flooding from rivers and the sea in Wales. To do this, Environment Agency Wales built, maintained and operated flood defences to protect people and property. It also issued flood warnings and works with communities at risk of flooding to help them find appropriate solutions to flood risk through its Flood Awareness Wales programme. When a flood happened, Environment Agency Wales worked with the emergency services and local authorities to minimise the harm to people and damage to property.

=== Protect and improve water, land and air ===
Environment Agency Wales was responsible for ensuring that environmental legislation was implemented properly on behalf of the Welsh and UK governments. This included regulating businesses such as power stations, chemical factories, metal processors, waste management sites, construction industry, food and drink manufacturers, farms and the water industry – to make sure that their work did not damage the environment. Where people and businesses needed to take water for drinking, industry and irrigation, Environment Agency Wales ensured that they did so without damaging the environment. To do this, Environment Agency Wales gave advice and issued permits, authorisations and consents to businesses that complied with legislative requirements. When pollution occurred, Environment Agency Wales worked to minimise any environmental damage, identify the source and stop any further pollution. If businesses failed to comply with their permits, and pollution occurred, Environment Agency Wales took enforcement action against them, including prosecution on occasion. Environment Agency Wales also led on dealing with serious waste crime which is often organised, large-scale and profitable. Priority waste crime types include large-scale illegal dumping, illegal waste sites and illegal exports of waste. It also dealt with high risk activities such as illegal disposal of wastes, where there was an actual or imminent threat of significant flooding or pollution.

=== Work with people and communities to create better places ===
Environment Agency Wales created and improved habitats for fish and other water-based wildlife such as salmon and helped species that were at risk, such as the freshwater pearl mussel. It also managed licences for fishing and navigation, so that people in Wales – and people visiting Wales – could enjoy the water environment.

=== Work with businesses and other organisations to use resources wisely ===
Environment Agency Wales licensed water abstractions from groundwater, rivers and lakes to ensure that the needs of people and business were met whilst protecting the environment and wildlife. It also regulated waste management facilities, such as landfill sites or large composting facilities, to ensure that they did not cause environmental damage and monitored the Landfill Allowances Scheme to track how waste is managed in Wales.

== Accreditation ==
- For the fourth year running, Stonewall Cymru, named Environment Agency Wales as the best place to work in Wales for lesbian, gay and bisexual people in 2012.
- Environment Agency Wales was accredited to both the ISO 14001 and EMAS environmental management standard.
- As a Welsh Government Sponsored Body, Environment Agency Wales had to provide its services within the Welsh political boundary (its public facing boundary) in Welsh as well as in English in accordance with the Welsh Language Act 1993.

== Structure ==
Environment Agency Wales had three operational areas, South East Wales, South West Wales and North Wales. Its other departments were Flood and Coastal Risk Management, Corporate Services, Human Resources, Finance and the policy department known as Strategic Unit Wales. All departments reported to the Director of Environment Agency Wales, Chris Mills.

== Committees ==
Environment Agency Wales had three statutory committees, each with their own responsibility and each contributing towards making Wales a better place for people and wildlife.

The committees were set up by Parliament under the Environment Act 1995. The committees were made up of external members who were elected to stand on the committee because they had the relevant expertise.

=== Environment Protection Advisory Committee Wales (EPAC) ===
EPAC advised Environment Agency Wales on issues of environmental protection, pollution control, water resources, air quality and waste regulation.

Chairman: Prof Tom Pritchard

=== Flood Risk Management Wales Committee (FRMW) ===
Chairman: Deep Sagar

=== Fisheries, Ecology and Recreation Advisory Committee (FERAC) ===
FERAC advised Environment Agency Wales on maintaining, improving and developing fisheries as well as recreation, navigation and conservations issues.

Chairman: Dr Graeme Harris

== Natural Resources Wales ==
On 1 April 2013, Environment Agency Wales, Countryside Council for Wales and Forestry Commission Wales were merged into Natural Resources Wales, a single body delivering the Welsh Government's environmental priorities for Wales.
