= Coleophora arctostaphyli =

Scientific classification
- Kingdom: Animalia
- Phylum: Arthropoda
- Class: Insecta
- Order: Lepidoptera
- Family: Coleophoridae
- Genus: Coleophora
- Species: C. arctostaphyli

Binomial name
- Coleophora arctostaphyli Meder, 1934

Species of moth

Coleophora arctostaphyli is a moth of the family Coleophoridae. It is found in Europe.

== Description ==
The wingspan is 12–14 mm (0.47–0.55 in).

The larvae feed on Arctostaphylos uva-ursi.

== Distribution ==
It is found from Fennoscandia to the Iberian Peninsula and Italy and from Great Britain to Poland.
