= List of acts of Senedd Cymru from 2022 =

This is a list of acts of Senedd Cymru passed in 2022. Acts of Senedd Cymru are enacted by Senedd Cymru (the Welsh Parliament; or simply the Senedd), which has legislative authority over devolved matters in relation to Wales under the authority of the Government of Wales Act 2006. All legislation passed by the Senedd is bilingual, with the English and Welsh texts being equally authoritative. Acts are cited by calendar year, in the same fashion as acts of Parliament of the United Kingdom. Each act passed in a respective year is numbered consecutively with Arabic numerals, following the prefix "asc" (or, in Welsh, "dsc").

2 acts of Senedd Cymru were passed in 2022.

indicates that an act has been transcribed on Wikisource, indicates that an act is available to view at legislation.gov.uk, and indicates the location of the original act in the National Library of Wales.

== Acts of Senedd Cymru ==
| Short title | Citation | Royal assent |
Long title
| Tertiary Education and Research (Wales) Act 2022; Deddf Addysg Drydyddol ac Ymchwil (Cymru) 2022 | 2022 asc 1; 2022 dsc 1 | 8 September 2022 |
An Act of Senedd Cymru to establish the Commission for Tertiary Education and Research and to make other provision about tertiary education (which includes higher education, further education and training) and research. Deddf gan Senedd Cymru i sefydlu'r Comisiwn Addysg Drydyddol ac Ymchwil ac i wneud darpariaeth arall ynghylch addysg drydyddol (sy'n cynnwys addysg uwch, addysg bellach a hyfforddiant) ac ymchwil.
| Welsh Tax Acts etc. (Power to Modify) Act 2022; Deddf Deddfau Trethi Cymru etc. (Pŵer i Addasu) 2022 | 2022 asc 2; 2022 dsc 2 | 8 September 2022 |
An Act of Senedd Cymru to confer on the Welsh Ministers a power to modify the Welsh Tax Acts and regulations made under those Acts for specified purposes; and to make provision for connected purposes. Deddf gan Senedd Cymru i roi pŵer i Weinidogion Cymru i addasu Deddfau Trethi Cymru a rheoliadau a wneir o dan y Deddfau hynny at ddibenion penodedig; ac i wneud darpariaeth at ddibenion cysylltiedig.
