= Badman Review =

Review conducted by Graham Badman

The Badman Review, also known as the Review into Elective Home Education in England, was conducted by Graham Badman, the former Director of Children's Services at Kent County Council.

The review was commissioned on 19 January 2009 by Ed Balls the Secretary of State for Children, Schools and Families with a remit to investigate current practice of local authorities in relation to home educators, and also to investigate whether home education could be used as a cover for some forms of child abuse, such as forced marriage and domestic servitude.

Published on 11 June 2009 the review's recommendations that related to safeguarding were accepted in full by Ed Balls on the day of publication. The review found no evidence to support suggestions that home education was linked to forced marriage, servitude or child trafficking. A public consultation on the recommendations of the review ended in October 2009.

== Responses to the review ==
The review caused widespread anger amongst home educators who rejected Badman's review as rushed, badly researched, disproportionate and offering little in the way of evidence to justify his recommendations.

The Conservative MP Mark Field has spoken against any changes to the current laws covering education in England. He presented a debate on 9 June 2009 in which he argued for the status quo to remain.

On 22 July 2009, the Children, Schools and Families Committee (the Parliamentary Select Committee with oversight of the work of the Department for Children, Schools and Families) announced its own inquiry into the handling of the Badman Review. Its report was published on 16 December 2009.

Select Committee's Summary and Conclusions
The Select Committee endorsed the idea of a registration scheme for home educating families, though suggested it should be voluntary in the first instance. However, the committee was critical of some of the recommendations in the Badman report, and of DCSF's handling of the review:

- Where we believe that the Badman Report and the proposals in the Children, Schools and Families Bill run into difficulty is in their conflation of education and safeguarding matters
- The way in which the Department has handled the Badman review has been unfortunate—from the way in which it framed the review, through to its drafting of legislation prior to publication of the related consultation findings. We trust that the Department will learn from this episode as it takes forward other such reviews in future

The Select Committee's recommendations include:
- Any registration system for home educating families should be light touch. In view of the concerns expressed by home educators about compulsory registration, we suggest that registration should be voluntary.
- We do not believe that annual home visits by local authority officers to home educating families would represent an improvement on existing safeguarding legislation
- We are not convinced that these meetings need take place in the family home under any circumstances.
- We do not believe that local authority officers responsible for liaising with home educating families should be given the right to interview a child away from the child's parents.
- We are concerned that any monitoring of home education provision should not undermine the flexibility and freedom currently enjoyed by home educating families in relation to the child's learning and development.

On the evening of 8 December 2009, history was made in the House of Commons when the highest number of petitions ever presented simultaneously on a single topic was placed in the petitions bag behind the Speaker's chair. Conservative MP Graham Stuart presented the petition rejecting the recommendations of the Badman Review from home educators across England and Wales declaring:

This is a historic night. More than 70 Honourable and Right Honourable members will present petitions from more than 120 different constituencies opposing the compulsory registration and monitoring of home educated children.

== Legislation ==
Following their acceptance of the Badman Review the government proposed, in the Queen's Speech on 18 November 2009, the introduction of a Children, Schools and Families Bill which would amend the Education Act 1996 so as to require home educated children to be registered with the local authority. The proposed changes were dropped due to a lack of cross party support prior to the pending election in May 2010
