= Education in Wales =

Welsh Government
- Minister for Education and the Welsh Language: Anna Brychan MS

National education budget (2021/22)
- Budget: £2,728.6 million

General details
- Primary languages: English and Welsh
- System type: National
- Compulsory education Devolution: 1880; 1999

Literacy (2003)
- Total: 99%
- Male: 99%
- Female: 99%

In Wales, education is compulsory for children between ages 5-16, and is largely state-funded and freely accessible at a primary and secondary level. It differs to some extent in structure and content to other parts of the United Kingdom, particularly in relation to the teaching of the Welsh language.

State-funded nursery education is typically offered from age three. Children usually enter fulltime primary school at age four, enter secondary school at age eleven and take their GCSEs at age 16. After that, young people have the option of enrolling in further education.

Formal education was originally a luxury, then provided by charity and later through the state. Universal primary education was established by the end of the 19th century and universal secondary education was reached by the mid 20th century. Attitudes to the Welsh language in education have varied overtime.

== History ==
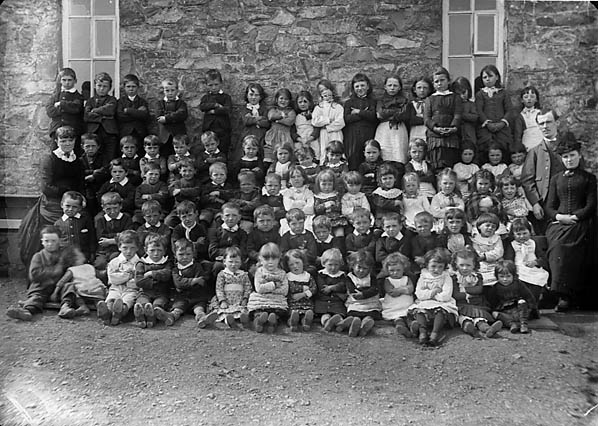
Infants class at Llithfaen school (1887)

Early forms of formal education were church or privately run and available to only a small segment of the population. In the 17th and 18th Centuries significant efforts were made, mainly by charitable causes, to expand access to basic education. In the 19th Century a state education system developed. By the end of the period education had become free and compulsory for children aged 5- to 12-years-old. Further increases to the school leaving age and the development of a system of secondary schools led by the mid 20th century to universal secondary education. Separate secondary schools for students of different academic abilities ended by 1980. Control over education policy was placed under the control of the devolved Welsh government in 1999.

== Structure ==
=== Early years care and education ===
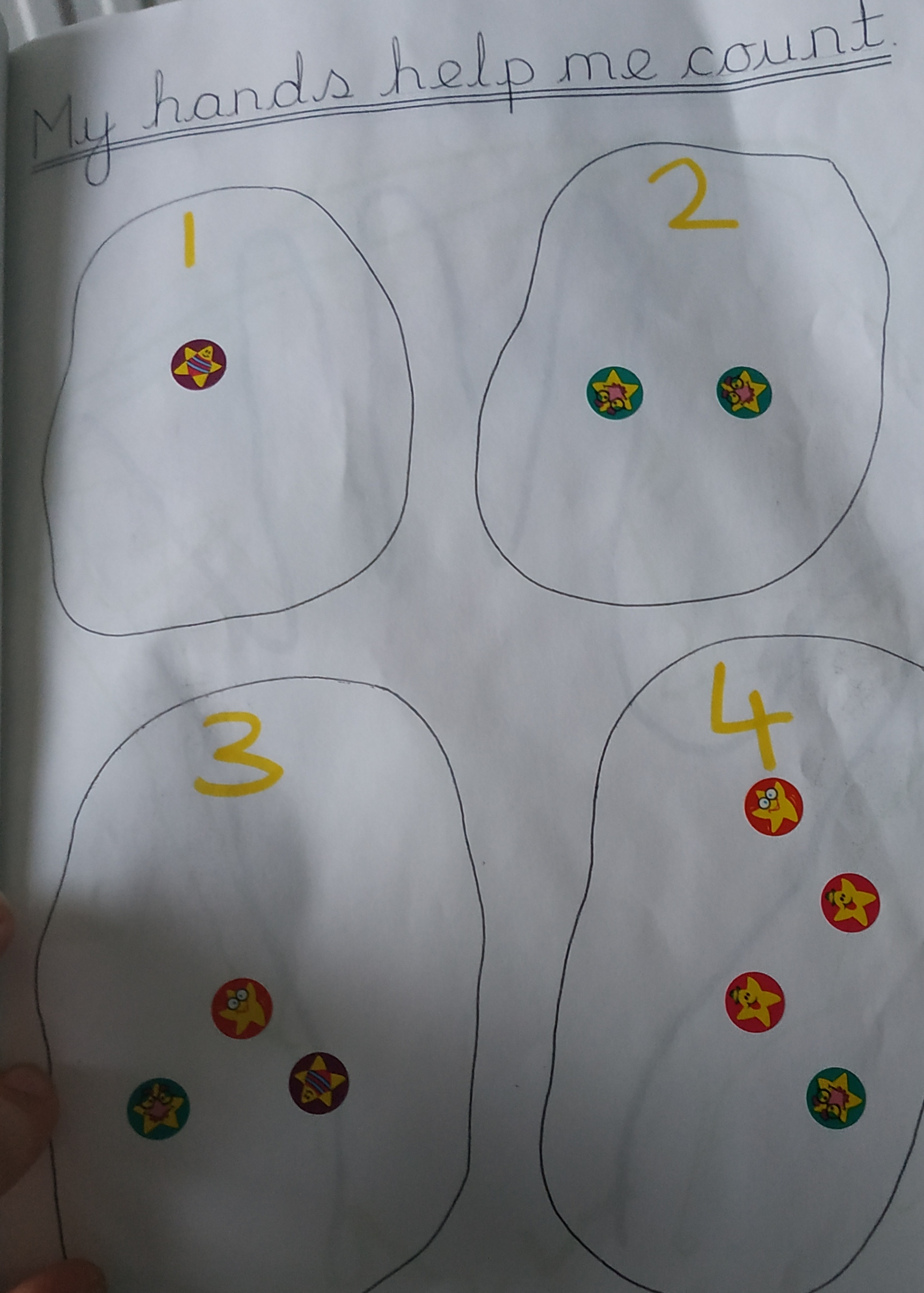
Numeracy activity completed in nursery class at Cwrt Rawlin Primary school, Caerphilly (2006)

From the start of the January, April or September (whichever comes soonest) following a child's third birthday they become eligible for a minimum of ten hours a week in publicly funded nursery education. Nursery lessons are focused on developing children's abilities in a variety of areas such as creativity, communication and general knowledge however, at this age, learning to read and write is not yet considered a priority. Depending on their parents economic and employment status children in this age-range may be eligible for up to twenty additional hours of state-subsidised childcare each week.

According to statistics for the 2021/2022 school year most state-funded primary schools in Wales and all separate infant schools included nursery provision. There were also eight separate nursery schools which are owned and run by the Local authority. The hours of state-funded childcare a child is entitled to can also be provided by other childcare facilities. According to a 2018 report, there were 4,012 such facilities registered in 2016, it also noted that "The majority of childcare providers are childminders (52%). The remaining childcare provision is delivered by sessional day care settings (20%), full day care settings (17%), out of school care settings (10%), open access play provision (1%) and crèches (0.5%)."

The Welsh government is planning to introduce universal state funded childcare for two-year-old children by the mid-2020s. Currently, only the most disadvantaged toddlers in this age group and those in some more deprived areas are entitled to 12.5 hours of care provided by the state.

=== Compulsory schooling ===
A child's age on 1 September determines the point of entry into the relevant stage of education. Education is compulsory beginning with the term following the child's fifth birthday, but may take place at either home or school. Most parents choosing to educate through school-based provision, however, enrol their children in the reception year in September of that school year, with most children thus beginning school at age four or four and a half. This age was traditionally much earlier than in most other Western nations, but in recent years many European countries have lowered their age of compulsory education, usually by making one or more years of kindergarten compulsory.

==== Primary education ====
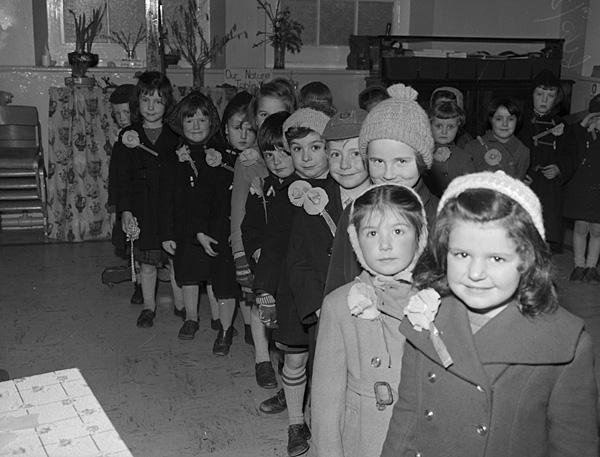
Primary school pupils in 1960, in Barmouth, celebrating St David's Day

In 2014/15, there were 1,330 primary schools in Wales with 273,400 pupils and 12,240 full-time equivalent (FTE) teachers. The teacher/pupil ratio was 1:22 and the average class size was 26 pupils. In 2015/16, there were 276,950 pupils in 1,310 primary schools – a rise of 3,550 since 2014/15.

In 2014/15, there were 435 Welsh-medium primary schools with 65,460 pupils, rising from 64,366 in 2013/14, but the number of Welsh-medium primary schools decreased from 444, due primarily to the closure of small rural schools.

Universal free school meals were introduced in Wales for children in the first year of primary school in September 2022. They are planned to be rolled out for all primary school children by 2024.

==== Secondary education ====
Children typically transfer from primary to secondary school between schools years six and seven, when they are 11 years old. In school year nine (or sometimes eight), pupils receive a choice of subjects to continue their studies in, with options available across multiple fields, varying between schools. Maths, English, Science and Welsh as a first or second language are compulsory whilst some schools may also make other subjects compulsory.

Pupils in secondary school take part in the compulsory GCSE prior to teaching school leaving age at ages 15/16. Since 2007 the Welsh Baccalaureate Qualification has also been available as an option although it was ungraded until 2015.

In 2014/15 there were 207 secondary schools (a drop of six since 2013/14) in Wales with 182,408 pupils and 11,269 FTE teachers (a drop of 310 since 2013/14). The pupil/teacher ratio was 17:1, which has remained largely the same since 2000/01. In 2015/16, there were 178,650 pupils in 205 secondary schools – a drop of 3,700 since 2014/15. The same report found that in 2015/16, there were 8,000 pupils in 34 independent schools, 4,540 pupils in 32 independent special schools, and 730 pupils in 25 pupil referral units.

In 2014/15, there were 50 Welsh-medium secondary (a drop of two since 2013/14) schools with 36,485 pupils, dropping from 37,400 in 2013/14. In the same year, there were four Welsh-medium middle schools (a rise of two since 2013/14) with 2,448 pupils, a rise from 1,577 in 2013/14.

In 2016, 60.3% of Year 11 pupils (aged 16) achieved the Level 2 inclusive threshold (Level 2 including a grade A*-C in English or Welsh first language and Mathematics). 35.6% of pupils eligible for FSM (free school meals) achieved the L2 inclusive threshold. 66.9% of pupils achieved A*-C in maths. 70.4% of pupils achieved A*-C in either English or Welsh first language.

Wales has often performed poorly in PISA results, which compare the academic abilities of adolescents around the world. The 2018 tests saw Wales' results improving but remaining the weakest of the four education systems of the UK in all subjects.

A new brand of vocational qualifications, called VCSEs, will be introduced in Wales from September 2027.

=== Tertiary education ===
Tertiary education covers all post-compulsory education in Wales, and is overseen by Medr (the Commission for Tertiary Education and Research). This included, sixth-forms (year 12 and 13), further education, universities, apprenticeships and adult community learning.

==== Further education ====
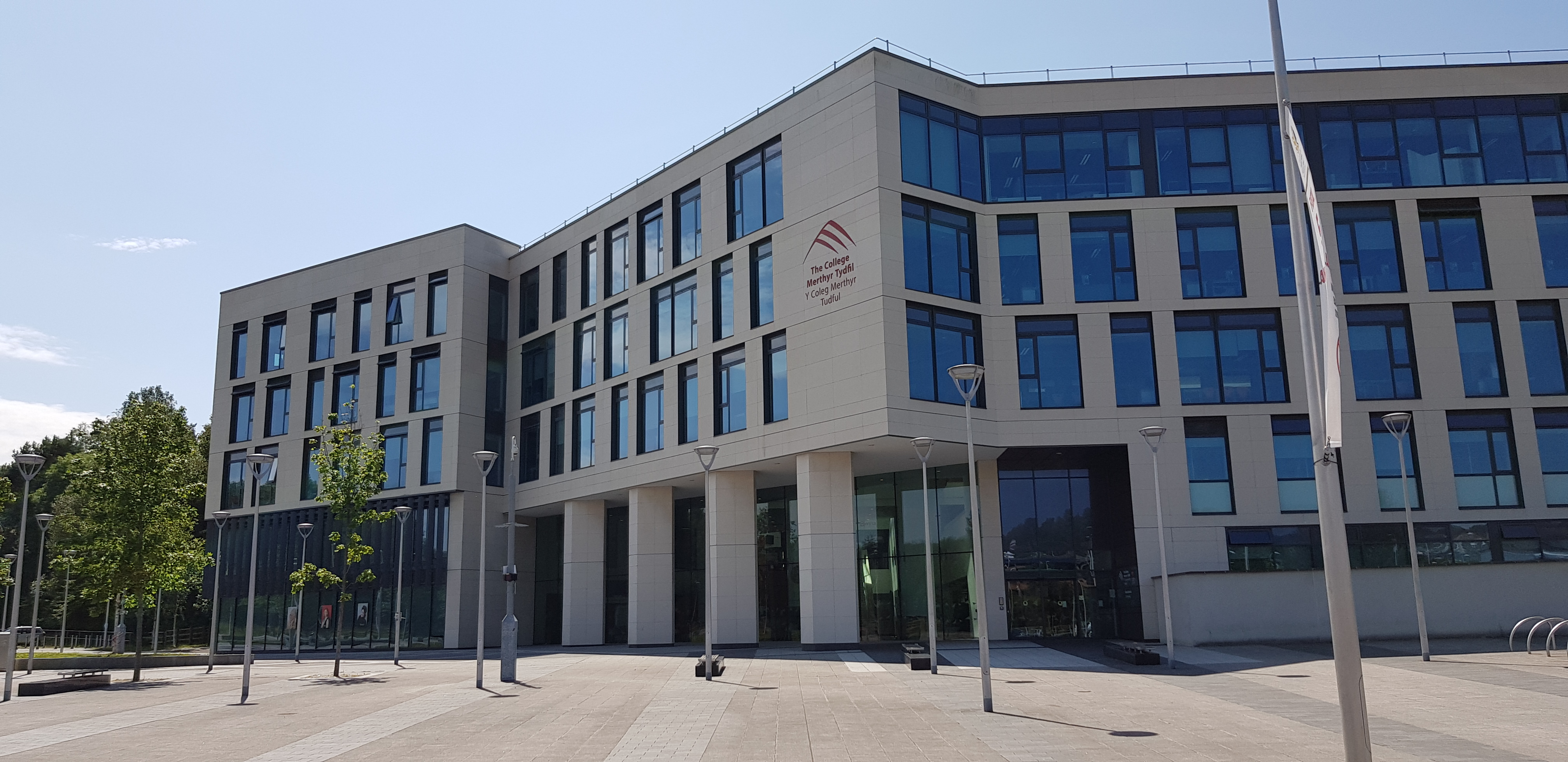
A further education college in Merthyr Tydfil

Further education (FE) includes full- and part-time learning for people over compulsory school age, excluding higher education. FE and publicly funded training in Wales is provided by 15 FE institutions in 2014/15 and a range of public, private and voluntary sector training providers, such as the Workers' Educational Association. Colleges vary in size and mission, and include general FE, tertiary and specialist institutions, including one Roman Catholic Sixth Form College and a residential adult education college. Many colleges offer leisure learning and training programmes designed to meet the needs of business. In 2014/15 there were 263,315 FE students in Wales spanning the entire availability of FE at multiple placements, including FE, HE (higher education), LA (local authority) Community, and work-based learning.

==== Adult community learning ====
Adult Community learning is a form of adult education or lifelong learning delivered and supported by local authorities in Wales. Programmes can be formal or informal, non-accredited or accredited, and vocational, academic or leisure orientated. In 2018–2019, there were 23,970 learners in Local Authority Community Learning.

==== Higher education ====
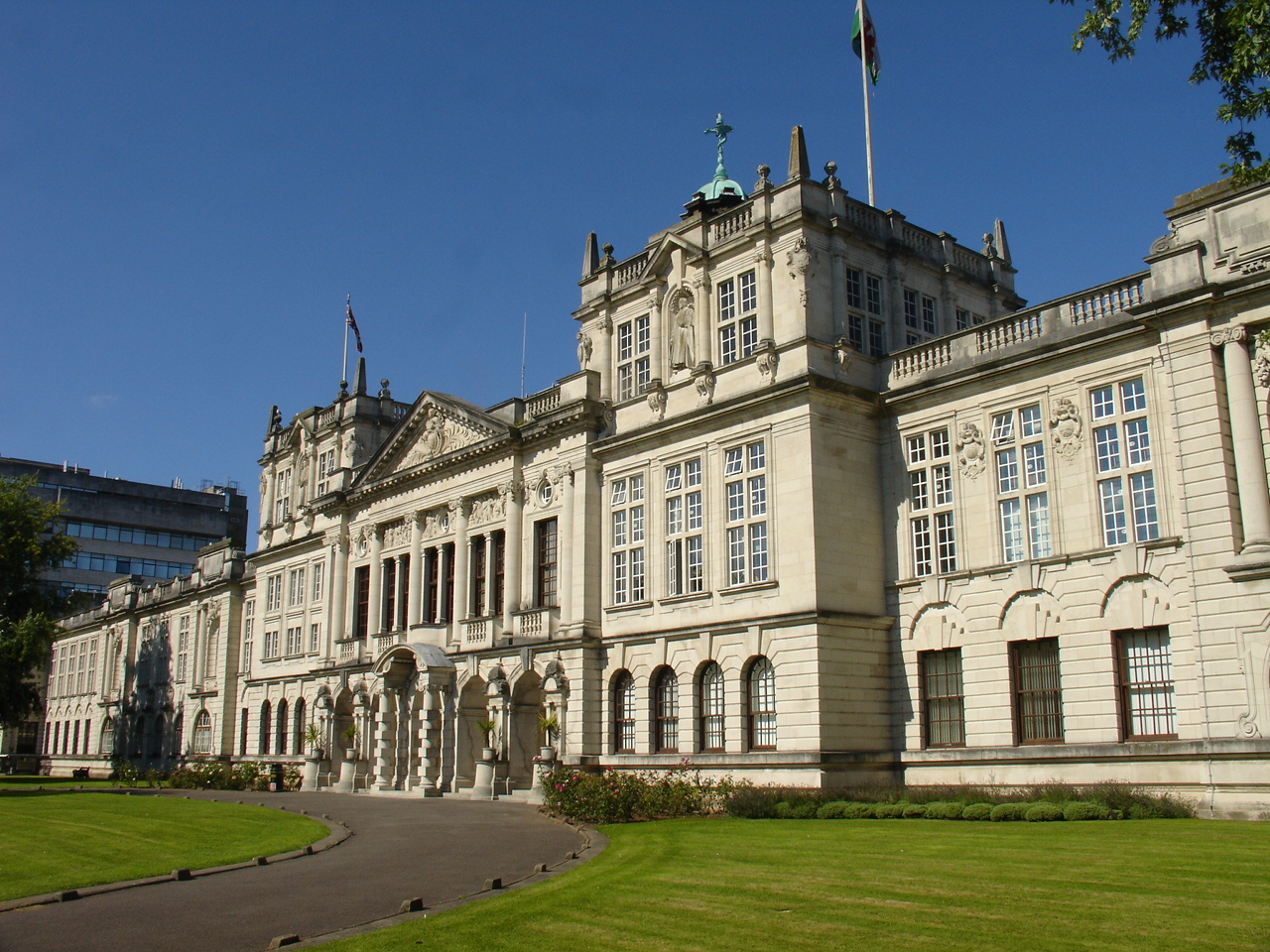
Main Building of Cardiff University

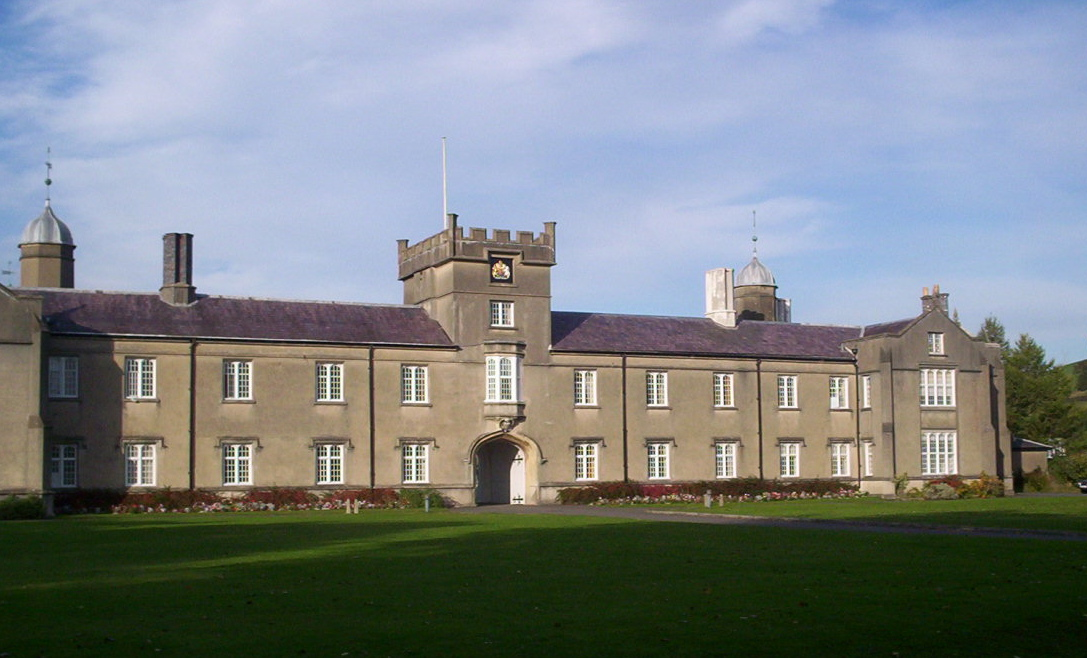
St David's building of the Lampeter campus of University of Wales Trinity St David (closed 2025)

Undergraduate students contribute £9,000 a year in fees, and are generally entitled to student loans and grants depending on their family's economic situation for maintenance. The state does not control syllabi, but it does influence admission procedures and monitors standards through the regulator, Medr.

In England, Wales and Northern Ireland all qualifications can be compared on a scale beginning with entry level and then followed by eight numbered levels, 1 is the equivalent of a weaker pass grade at GCSE and 8 the equivalent of a doctorate. Undergraduate degrees typically the first higher education qualifications available are usually level 4, 5 or 6. Students will generally need A-Levels or an equivalent at a certain grade to enroll on them but may be able to do a foundation year prior to starting if their grades are weaker. There are various types of undergraduate degree but the most common is a bachelor's degree which generally takes three years to complete and involves studying one or sometimes two subjects in detail. It is a level 6 qualification.

A postgraduate degree is a level 7 or 8 qualification. It can typically only be completed after an undergraduate degree has been completed. It is generally focused on a more specific topic rather than the more general subject taught at undergraduate level. These generally come in two types the "taught" degree which conducted more in the style of an undergraduate degree and "research" degree where the student directs their own study of a self-chosen question in a more independent manner. A master's degree is the highest level of qualification.

In 2014/15 there were 145,735 enrolments at HE institutions in Wales, including 97,900 first degree and other undergraduates and 27,780 postgraduates. Welsh HE institutions had a total of 10,140 full-time and part-time staff.

== Governance ==
=== Local administration and individual schools ===
Unlike in England, where state schools are increasingly run in an Academy model where they are funded directly by the central government, state schools in Wales are overseen by local authorities. Local authority funded or maintained schools come in various different models. The Community school is owned and run by the local authority, the Voluntary controlled schools are owned by a charity with close oversight from the local authority, the Voluntary aided schools are owned by a charity with a greater degree of self-governance and the Foundation school is owned by a governing body or charity organisation with limited local authority oversight. In the second and third case the charity is usually a religious organisation, typically the Church in Wales or the Roman Catholic Church.

The curriculum being rolled out in Wales from 2022 onwards is intended to give individual schools more control over the instruction they provide and the autonomy to develop their own curricula within a basic set of guidelines.

Local authorities in Wales
- Isle of Anglesey County Council
- Blaenau Gwent County Borough Council
- Bridgend County Borough Council
- Caerphilly County Borough Council
- Cardiff Council
- Carmarthenshire County Council
- Ceredigion County Council
- Conwy County Borough Council
- Denbighshire County Council
- Flintshire County Council
- Gwynedd Council
- Merthyr Tydfil County Borough Council
- Monmouthshire County Council
- Neath Port Talbot County Borough Council
- Newport City Council
- Pembrokeshire County Council
- Powys County Council
- Rhondda Cynon Taf County Borough Council
- City and County of Swansea council
- Torfaen County Borough Council
- Vale of Glamorgan Council
- Wrexham County Borough Council

==== Education Consortia ====
In 2014, there were four formal education consortia in Wales covering:

- North Wales (GwE) (Flintshire, Conwy, Wrexham, Gwynedd, Isle of Anglesey, Denbighshire)
- South West and Mid Wales (ERW) (Swansea, Neath Port Talbot, Carmarthenshire, Pembrokeshire, Powys, Ceredigion)
- Central South Wales (CSC) (Bridgend, Cardiff, Merthyr Tydfil, Rhondda Cynon Taff, Vale of Glamorgan)
- South East Wales (EAS) (Caerphilly, Monmouthshire, Newport, Blaenau Gwent, Torfaen)

The role of Education Consortia is to assist in school improvement in their respective regions. This includes areas such as the effectiveness of schools leadership, the quality of their teaching and pupils results. The South West and Mid Wales Consortia partially broke down in 2020 with Powys, Ceredigion and Neath Port Talbot all leaving. The former two councils then formed an informal partnership whilst Neath Port Talbot remained outside the Consortia system as of March 2022.

=== Welsh government oversight and Wales-wide institutions ===
The governance of education has been devolved in Wales since the creation of the Welsh Assembly in 1999 along with other related policy areas such as Welsh language policy and local government. This has led to the creation of a somewhat distinctive education system. Wales has its own education inspectorate, qualifications regulator and curriculum.

=== UK government role and UK-wide institutions ===
The money the Welsh government has to spend in devolved areas is broadly pegged to money the UK government spends in equivalent areas in England through a system called the Barnett formula. However, the devolved administrations are not obliged to spend the money they receive in the same policy area as it was spent in England (e.g. the equivalent to money spent on health in England could be spent on education in Wales). More broadly Wales's and the other UK education systems are all influenced by their interactions with reserved matters and coexistence within the United Kingdom.

== Welsh language ==
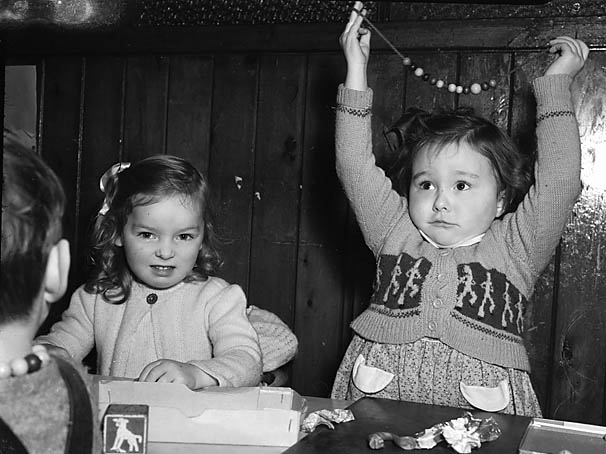
Children at Crwys Road infants school, an early Welsh-medium school in Cardiff (1951)

In the 19th century Welsh was often repressed by schools. In the 20th century the language gradually gained a more prominent role in the education system.

A significant minority of students in Wales are educated largely through the medium of Welsh: in 2014/15, 15.7% of children and young people received Welsh-medium education – a drop from the 15.9% in 2010/11. An additional 10% attended schools in which significant portion of the curriculum is bilingual. The study of the Welsh language is available to all age groups through nurseries, schools, colleges, and universities, and in adult education. Though, involvement is fairly limited above secondary school level. The study of the language is compulsory for all pupils in State Schools until the age of 16.

Educational institutions have flexibility over how much English children are taught prior to the age of seven. This is in order to allow Welsh medium schools and nurseries to immerse young children in the language as much as possible. In the later years of primary school, the curriculum at Welsh medium schools continues to be mostly (70% or more) taught in Welsh whilst at secondary level all subjects other than English are taught in Welsh. However, as they get older, students in Welsh medium education are required to work towards the same tests and qualifications in the English language as their counterparts who were primarily educated in English.

== Legislation ==
=== Education (Wales) Measure 2009 ===
Education (Wales) Measure 2009
- Measure of the National Assembly for Wales
- National Assembly for Wales
- Long title: A Measure of the National Assembly for Wales to make provision for children to have a right of appeal in respect of special educational needs, and a right to make a claim in respect of disability discrimination in schools, to the Special Educational Needs Tribunal for Wales; to make provision for the following in relation to special educational needs and disability discrimination in schools: advice and information services, arrangements for dispute resolution other than by appeals and claims to the Special Educational Needs Tribunal for Wales, and independent advocacy services; to make provision for piloting of the provisions of Part 1 of this Measure; to make provision about the curriculum in schools in Wales; and for connected purposes.
- Citation: 2009 nawm 5
- Introduced by: Jane Hutt AM, Minister for Children, Education, Lifelong Learning and Skills

Dates
- Royal approval: 9 December 2009

Status: Amended

Text of the Education (Wales) Measure 2009 as in force today (including any amendments) within the United Kingdom, from legislation.gov.uk.

The Education (Wales) Measure 2009 made certain reforms to allow appeals and claims of disability discrimination to the Special Educational Needs Tribunal.

=== Learning and Skills (Wales) Measure 2009 ===
Learning and Skills (Wales) Measure 2009
- Measure of the National Assembly for Wales
- National Assembly for Wales
- Long title: A Measure of the National Assembly for Wales to make provision about the entitlement to education of children in the last two years of compulsory schooling and young persons who have not attained the age of nineteen; to make provision as regards the provision by maintained schools and institutions within the further education sector of services related to education; to make provision for the disclosure of curriculum information; and for connected purposes.
- Citation: 2009 nawm 1
- Introduced by: John Griffiths AM - Deputy Minister for Skills

Dates
- Royal approval: 13 May 2009

Status: Current legislation

History of passage through the Assembly

Text of the Learning and Skills (Wales) Measure 2009 as in force today (including any amendments) within the United Kingdom, from legislation.gov.uk.

The Learning and Skills (Wales) Measure 2009 changed the curriculum to widen pupil choice.

=== Education (Wales) Measure 2011 ===
Education (Wales) Measure 2011
- Measure of the National Assembly for Wales
- National Assembly for Wales
- Long title: A Measure of the National Assembly for Wales to make provision for collaboration between local authorities, governing bodies of maintained schools and further education institutions; to make provision for the federation of maintained schools, the training of governors and clerks to governing bodies of maintained schools and the provision of such clerks; to make provision prohibiting new foundation schools; and for connected purposes.
- Citation: 2011 nawm 7
- Introduced by: Leighton Andrews AM, Minister for Children, Education and Lifelong Learning

Dates
- Royal approval: 10 May 2011

Status: Amended

History of passage through the Assembly

Text of the Education (Wales) Measure 2011 as in force today (including any amendments) within the United Kingdom, from legislation.gov.uk.

The Education (Wales) Measure 2011 facilitated the establishment of federations of schools. The measure also established statutory training for governors and effective clerking.

=== Further and Higher Education (Governance and Information) (Wales) Act 2014 ===
Further and Higher Education (Governance and Information) (Wales) Act 2014
- Act of the National Assembly for Wales
- National Assembly for Wales
- Long title: An Act of the National Assembly for Wales to make provision about the governance of institutions within the further education sector and about the supply of information in connection with the provision of support to students in further or higher education.
- Citation: 2014 anaw 1
- Introduced by: Leighton Andrews AM, Minister for Children, Education and Lifelong Learning

Dates
- Royal assent: 27 January 2014

Status: Current legislation

History of passage through the Assembly

Text of the Further and Higher Education (Governance and Information) (Wales) Act 2014 as in force today (including any amendments) within the United Kingdom, from legislation.gov.uk.

In 2010, the Office for National Statistics announced that it reclassified the further education colleges due to the Welsh Government's control over matters such as pay rates. The Further and Higher Education (Governance and Information) (Wales) Act 2014 changed the governance arrangements to allow the ONS to return the classification as private, by transferring more autonomy to individual FE colleges.

== See also ==
- Education
- Education in the United Kingdom
- List of education articles by country

=== Aspects ===
- Home education in the United Kingdom
- Primary education in Wales
- Secondary education in Wales

=== Elsewhere in the UK ===
- Education in England
- Education in Northern Ireland
- Education in Scotland
