= Welsh Tax Acts etc. (Power to Modify) Act 2022 =

Welsh legislation

Welsh Tax Acts etc. (Power to Modify) Act 2022 (Note: Welsh: Deddf Deddfau Trethi Cymru etc. (Pŵer i Addasu) 2022)
- Act of Senedd Cymru
- Senedd Cymru
- Long title: An Act of Senedd Cymru to confer on the Welsh Ministers a power to modify the Welsh Tax Acts and regulations made under those Acts for specified purposes; and to make provision for connected purposes. (Note: Welsh: Deddf gan Senedd Cymru i roi pŵer i Weinidogion Cymru i addasu Deddfau Trethi Cymru a rheoliadau a wneir o dan y Deddfau hynny at ddibenion penodedig; ac i wneud darpariaeth at ddibenion cysylltiedig.)
- Citation: 2022 asc 2
- Introduced by: Rebecca Evans
- Territorial extent: Wales

Dates
- Royal assent: 8 September 2022
- Commencement: 9 September 2022

Status: Current legislation

Text of statute as originally enacted

Text of the Welsh Tax Acts etc. (Power to Modify) Act 2022 as in force today (including any amendments) within the United Kingdom, from legislation.gov.uk.

The Welsh Tax Acts etc. (Power to Modify) Act 2022 (asc 2) (Welsh: Deddf Deddfau Trethi Cymru etc. (Pŵer i Addasu) 2022) is an Act of Senedd Cymru which allows Welsh ministers to amend tax law using regulatory powers. The Tax Acts in question are the Tax Collection and Management (Wales) Act 2016, the Land Transaction Tax and Anti-avoidance of Devolved Taxes (Wales) Act 2017, and the Landfill Disposals Tax (Wales) Act 2017.

It was introduced by Rebecca Evans, the Finance and Local Government minister in the Welsh government, on 13 December 2021. It was passed by Senedd Cymru on 12 July 2022 and came into effect on 9 September 2022, the day after it received royal assent.

== Provisions ==
=== Amending powers ===
The act allows Welsh ministers to amend the Welsh Tax Acts using regulatory powers for any of the following purposes:

- Making sure that the Landfill Disposals Tax or the Land Transaction Tax (the Welsh equivalents of landfill tax and stamp duty) are not levied in instances which would be incompatible with any of the United Kingdom's international obligations
- Protecting against tax avoidance in relation to the Landfill Disposals Tax or the Land Transaction Tax
- Responding to changes in the landfill tax and stamp duty (taxes set in Westminster which do not apply to Wales) if those changes could affect the amount paid to the Welsh Consolidated Fund
- Responding to court rulings which could affect the operation or regulations of any of the Welsh Tax Acts

Certain parts of the Tax Acts are not allowed to be modified using the powers in the act. These include:

- Part 2 of the Tax Collection and Management (Wales) Act 2016 (which established and gave powers to the Welsh Revenue Authority)
- Any regulations made under provisions of the Land Transaction Tax and Anti-avoidance of Devolved Taxes (Wales) Act 2017 which relate to tax rates for the Land Transaction Tax
- Any regulations made under provisions of the Landfill Disposals Tax (Wales) Act 2017 which relate to tax rates for the Landfill Disposals Tax

The act also regulates the process by which ministers can make amendments which have retrospective effect; ministers have to make a statement to Senedd Cymru and the amendment cannot apply retrospectively to any time before the statement was made. Ministers cannot retrospectively impose penalties or extend liabilities to a penalty, cannot relate to investigation of criminal offences, and cannot change the procedure by which Senedd Cymru makes statutory instruments under the Tax Acts. The Welsh government was required to publish a statement of their policy on making regulations with retrospective effect within three months of the act gaining royal assent. The policy statement was published on 24 October 2022. The policy statement may be revised, but any revision must also be published.

Statutory instruments made under the amending powers in this act must have the approval of Senedd Cymru or, if urgent, must be approved within 60 days of the day on which they were made. If they are not approved within the time period, then they expire; if an approval motion fails to pass the Senedd, the instrument expires at the end of the day of the vote. Any tax liabilities or other changes which occurred while expired regulations were in effect, and would not have occurred but for the regulations, are deemed to have never occurred.

=== Review and sunset clause ===
The act's operation and effectiveness must be reviewed by the Welsh government, and the review must be published within four years of the Act coming into force (i.e. 9 September 2026).

The act also has a sunset clause: the amending powers expire five years after the act comes into force, although the Welsh government can choose to renew it for one extra term until up to 30 April 2031 using a statutory instrument. The statutory instrument cannot be laid before the Senedd before the government has published their review into the Act, and cannot be approved until after the sunset clause lapses.

== Timetable ==
=== Introduction and report stage (Stage 1) ===
The bill was introduced on 13 December 2021 by Rebecca Evans, the Finance and Local Government minister in the Welsh government. Scrutiny by the Finance Committee (composed of Peredur Owen Griffiths, Mike Hedges, Rhianon Passmore and Peter Fox) began on 16 December. Their report was laid before the Senedd on 8 April 2022, with all members except from Peter Fox (the Shadow Minister for Finance) recommending that, once the conclusions of the report had been taken on board, the general principles of the bill be agreed to. Evans responded on behalf of the Welsh government on 11 May, accepting most of the recommendations.

Scrutiny by the Legislation, Justice and Constitution Committee (formed of Huw Irranca-Davies, Alun Davies, Rhys ab Owen and Peter Fox) also resulted in a report published on the same day. The report was critical of the legislative approach of the Welsh government, specifically the inclusion of 'Henry VIII powers' enabling minister to amend existing primary legislation with secondary legislation, which the committee said would be "contrary to established parliamentary practice and principles associated with good law-making". The report concluded that the bill was not "an appropriate legislative vehicle" to make the needed changes and that amendments through primary legislation would be preferable, and recommended that the government table amendments to include a sunset clause before July 2027 and a statutory review within two years, as well as changing and clarifying specific parts of the bill. The recommendations on a sunset clause and statutory review were accepted in principle by the government, but the timings were increased.

In a plenary session of the Senedd on 26 April, the general principles of the bill were accepted with 27 members voting for, 26 against, and one abstaining. The motion to agree to the financial resolution in relation to the bill also passed by the same margins.

=== Committee consideration of amendments (Stage 2) ===
On 28 April, the Welsh government tabled an amendment to restrict the power to introduce changes with retrospective effect. A further five government amendments were tabled on 27 May. Llyr Gruffydd tabled seven amendments all supported by Peter Fox and Fox tabled eight amendments all supported by Gruffydd. In the Finance Committee session on 9 June, all of the government amendments were accepted; all of the amendments proposed by Gruffydd or Fox were either rejected or not moved.

=== Senedd passage (Stages 3 & 4) ===
The amendments were then voted on in a plenary session of the Senedd on 5 July, and the bill was approved a final time on 12 July. The bill was given royal assent on 8 September, notably the day on which Elizabeth II died.

== Responses ==
The Institute of Chartered Accountants in England and Wales (ICAEW) supported the "policy purpose behind the Bill" but criticised that amendments would be made through secondary legislation rather than primary legislation, saying there was "a danger of a lack of proper scrutiny".

== See also ==
- List of acts of Senedd Cymru from 2022
