= Daugherty Report =

Welsh educational assessment report

Learning pathways through statutory assessment: Key Stages 2 and 3, also known as the Daugherty Report, is a government review of the educational assessment system for Key Stages 2 and 3 (11- and 14-year-olds) in Wales. The review was commissioned by Jane Davidson of the National Assembly for Wales in June 2003 and undertaken by a group led by Professor Richard Daugherty from the University of Wales, Aberystwyth.

The group were given the task of reviewing the nature and suitability of the national statutory assessments, looking in particular at the timing of the tests, and what uses the resulting data are put to. The impact of the tests on the primary to secondary transition was also investigated.

The interim report, released on 22 January 2004, was perceived by the media as supporting a complete abolishment of the statutory tests at both Key Stages 2 and 3. The report suggested that 10-year-old pupils (year 5) should take aptitude tests. The aim of these should be to inform teaching in year 6, and later in secondary school, whilst noting that the results of these could be collected for monitoring purposes. It also recommended that teacher assessments at the end of year 6 remain compulsory.

At Key Stage 3, the interim report suggested that the current assessment system be phased out after three years, and replaced with assessments at the end of year 8 or beginning of year 9. Over this three years, a system for moderation of teacher assessments would be developed. It would be up to secondary schools to ensure that consistent teacher assessments had occurred in their feeder schools.

Inter-country monitoring would be achieved by using a sample of attainments linked to the OECD's Programme for International Student Assessment. The report also noted the importance of developing formative assessment practices.

The review group has worked closely with ACCAC, who are also undertaking an assessment review due for release in April 2004, the same time as the final Daugherty Report is published.

== Members of the review group ==
- Richard Daugherty (Chair)
- Gareth Morgans, headteacher, Carmarthenshire
- Irene Perry, headteacher, Conwy
- Michael Bassett, teacher, Rhondda Cynon Taff
- Mark Ansell, teacher, Aberystwyth
- Helen Cleaves, parent-governor, Monmouthshire
- Sioned Bowen, Director of Education, Denbighshire
- John Valentine Williams, Chief Executive of ACCAC
- Susan Lewis, HM Chief Inspector, Estyn
- Keith Davies, Head of Standards and Performance Division of the Welsh Assembly
