= Angela Meder =

German zoologist

Angela Meder is a German primatologist, conservationist, and specialist on gorillas. Dr. Meder was one of the first to undertake in-depth research on captive gorillas (in the early 1980s). She focused on the effect of the captive environment on their behaviour and reproduction, and on the behavioural effects of hand-rearing, including the difficult problem of integrating hand-reared infants into established groups.

In 1992, Meder joined a recently founded conservation group, Berggorilla und Regenwald Direkthilfe (B&RD). She argues that conservation organisations in the developed world have a particular obligation to assist local communities to organize and maintain their own conservation initiatives, and under her guidance B&RD has helped locally organised enterprises in the Democratic Republic of Congo and elsewhere, and its board periodically visits these community projects to help and to deliver material assistance.

Meder edits the Gorilla Journal, which is both the outlet for B&RD projects as well as a scientific journal to which specialists contribute.

== See also ==
- Animal cognition
- Dian Fossey
- Great Ape language
- Mountain gorilla
- Dawn Prince-Hughes
- Yerkes National Primate Research Center
