= Meder House =

Building in Heidelberg, Germany

Coordinates: 49.411724°N 8.708659°E

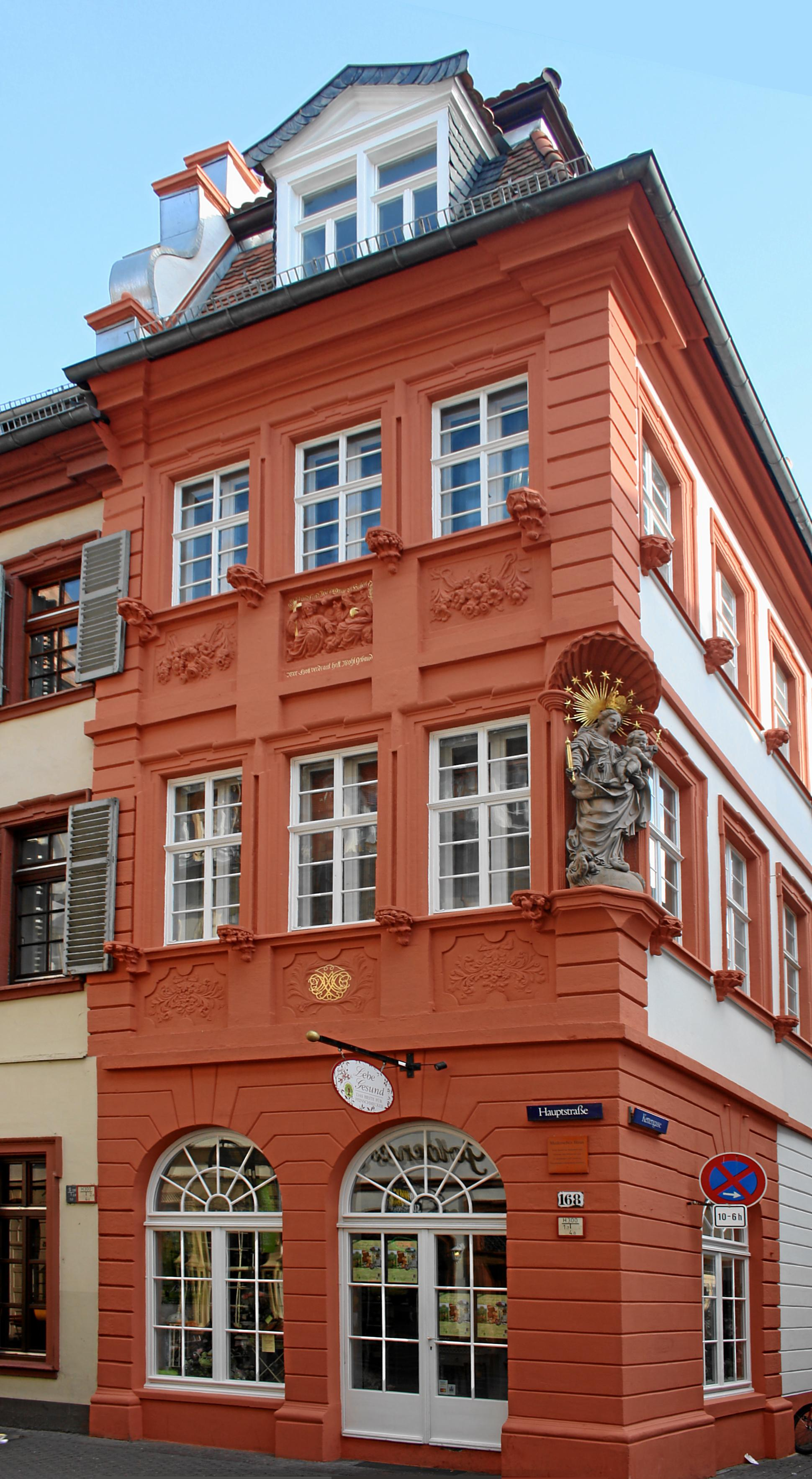
Meder House, Hauptstraße 168

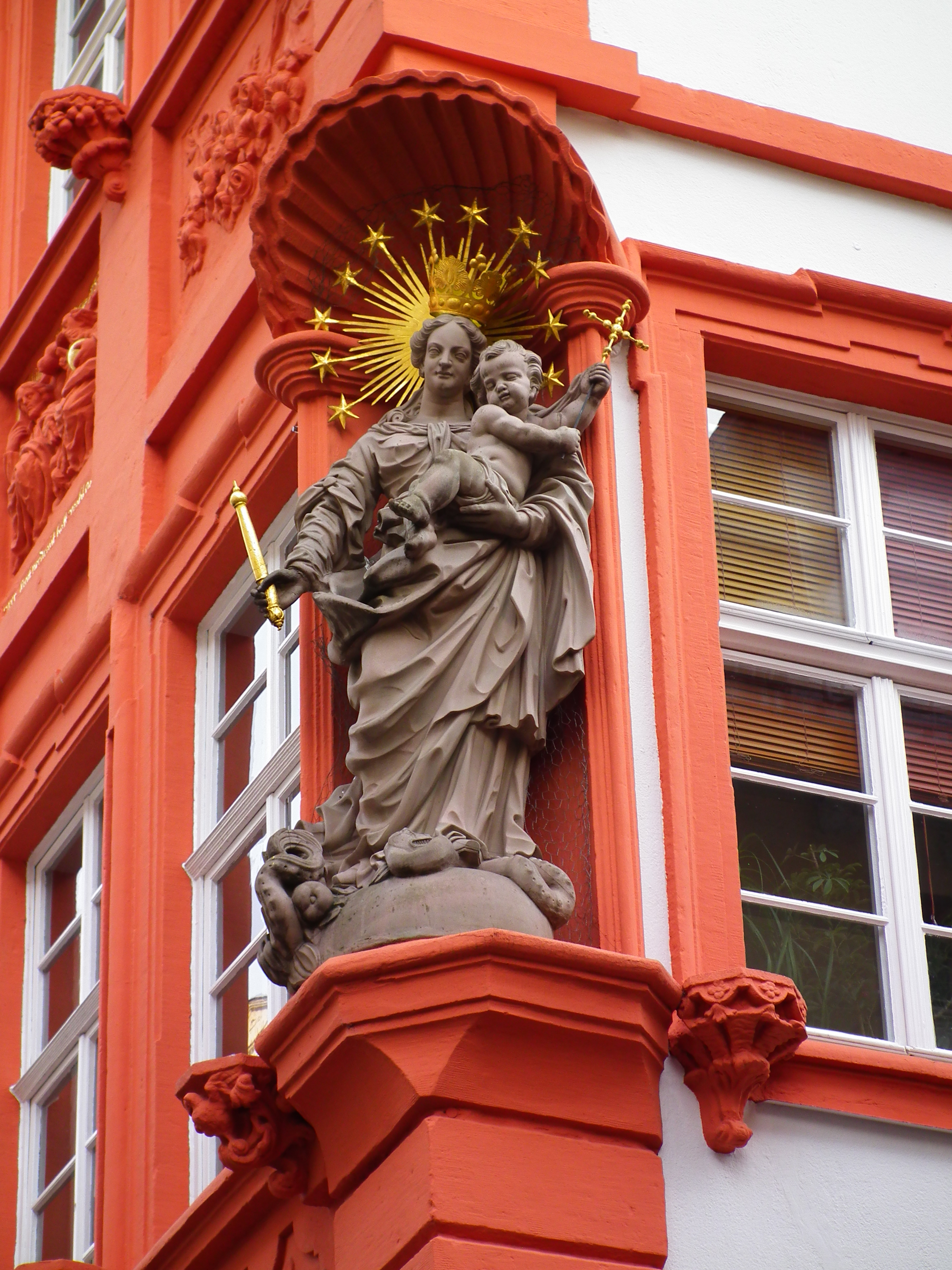
Meder House Madonna

Meder House (German: Haus Meder) is a protected baroque building on the Hauptstrasse in Heidelberg's old town, the Altstadt. It is a residential building that was built in the first half of the 18th century and was in the possession of the Meder family, who worked as merchants, from 1839 at the latest.

The three-story house with an attic apartment is located in the eastern half of the Hauptstrasse, the main street of the Heidelberg Altstadt, on the corner with Kettengasse ("chain alley"). The showy facade on the Hauptstrasse has three windows on each floor, while the facade on Kettengasse is longer, with eight windows, but also simpler. At the corner, on the first floor is a Madonna, which was probably made by the sculptor Peter van den Branden, who also made the Kornmarkt-Madonna. The statue on the building today is a copy; the original is kept in the Kurpfälzisches Museum. The central relief on the facade, depicting the Trinity, is remarkable for their period. It is flanked by two inscriptions: "Alle Stund und Zeit sei gelobt die heilige Dreifaltigkeit" (Every hour and moment, let the Holy Trinity be praised!) and "Wer Gott verdraut hatt wohl Gebaut" (He who trusts God, has built well). The decoration of the building thus showcases the Catholic piety of its owners, during the Counterreformation in Heidelberg.

== Bibliography ==
- Melanie Mertens et al.: Stadtkreis Heidelberg (= Denkmaltopographie Bundesrepublik Deutschland: Kulturdenkmale in Baden-Württemberg. Vol II.5). 2 Vol.s, Jan Thorbecke, Ostfildern 2013, ISBN 978-3-7995-0426-3, p. 269.
