= Anna Meder =

German printer

- Born: October 26, 1606; Steinenkirch
- Died: 1649
- Occupation: Printer

Anna Meder, born Anna Görlin or Gerlin or Gerler in Steinenkirch (October 21, 1606 – 1649) was a German printer of the 17th century in Ulm.

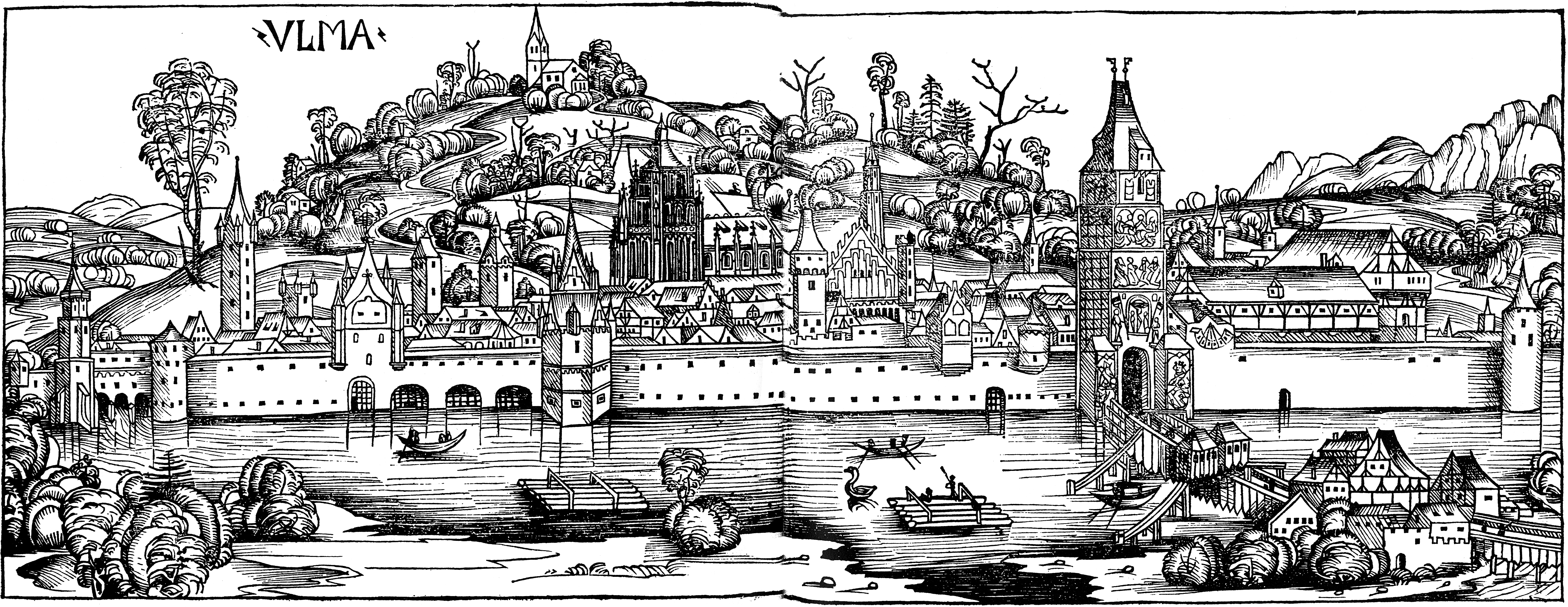
Ulm in 1493

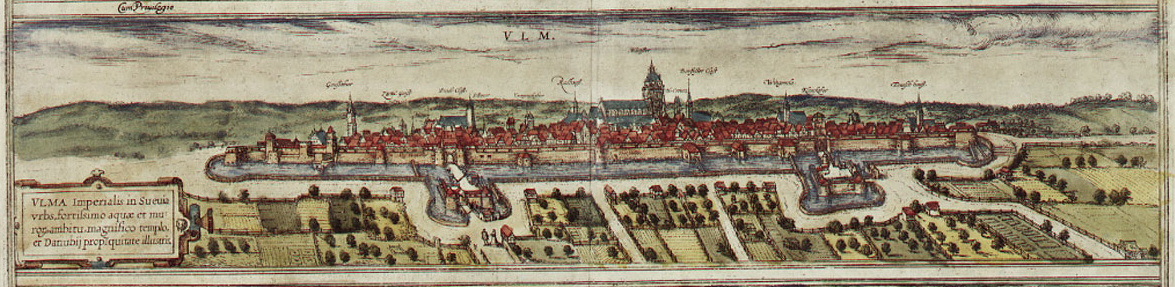
Ulm in 1572

== Biography ==
Anna Görlin was born in October 1606 in Steinenkirch. Her father was a Protestant minister. She married the printer Johann Sebastian Meder (1612-1635) who died in 1635 most probably of the plague. After his death, Anna Meder took over the management of the Mederische Truckerey printing house, a common appointment for a widow at that time. The Ulm Council tried in vain to convince her brother-in-law Michael Meder from Rostock to take over the printing shop and Anna Meder was then officially appointed printer of the city of Ulm on July, 1st 1636. She remained in this position in Ulm until 1637. During this period she printed the Ulmische Danksagungspredigt by the Ulm theologian and pedagogue Konrad Dieterich, as well as the Leichenpredigt, a funeral sermon by the renowned Ulm physician Gregory Horstius.

In August 1637 Anna Meder married Balthasar Kühn (1615-1667), a printer from Erfurt, who from then on ran the official printing house of the city of Ulm for a salary of 40 florins. From this union three daughters and a son named Christian Balthasar Kühn (1644-1678) were born. After his father's death, their son took over the management of the printing house.

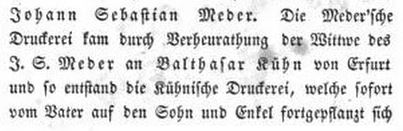
Anna Meder in Konrad Dietrich Haßlers 1840 book Die Buchdrucker-Geschichte Ulm's

== Selected publications ==
- Ulmische Danksagungspredigt des Konrad Dieterich. Ulm 1636 (imprimé à Ulm par Johann=Sebastian Meders S. Wittib. Anno M. DC. XXXVI.), VD17 23:630553N. Leichenpredigt für Gregor Horstius. Ulm 1636, 88 pages.

== Bibliography ==
- Christoph Reske: Die Buchdrucker des 16. und 17. Jahrhunderts im deutschen Sprachgebiet. Harrassowitz, Wiesbaden 2007, ISBN 978-3-447-05450-8, S. 939.
- Schmitt, Elmar (1992). Balthasar Kühn : Buchdruckerei und Verlag Kühn, Ulm 1637-1736 : Bibliographie : mit einer Geschichte des Ulmer Buchdrucks von 1571-1781 und einer Darstellung der reichsstädtischen Bücher- und Zeitungszensur. Bernhard Appenseller. Weissenhorn: A.H. Konrad. ISBN 3-87437-323-1. OCLC 30702165.
- Weyermann, Albrecht (1829). Neue historisch-biographisch-artistische Nachrichten von Gelehrten und Künstlern, auch alten und neuen adelichen und bürgerlichen Familien aus der vormaligen Reichsstadt Ulm: Fortsetzung der Nachrichten von Gelehrten, Künstlern und andern merkwürdigen Personen aus Ulm (in German). Stettin.
