= Residential Property Tribunal Wales =

Welsh property tribunal collective

- The royal badge of Wales
- Established: 2004
- Jurisdiction: Wales
- Authorised by: Housing Act 2004
- Appeals to: Upper Tribunal (Lands Chamber)
- Website: residentialpropertytribunal.gov.wales

The Residential Property Tribunal Wales (RPTW) is a collective of tribunals sponsored by the Welsh Government that deal with disputes related to housing and residential property.

It was established by the Housing Act 2004 and also has powers under the Mobile Homes Act 1983 and Rent Act 1977.

== Proceedings ==
Hearings can be either in-person or written. If in-person, the hearing will normally be held at the RPTW office in Cardiff or somewhere that is within travelling distance from the location involved in the dispute (e.g. a local hotel).

The tribunal has no power to enforce the orders it makes, as this is held by the County Court.

Proceedings can be conducted in either English or Welsh.

=== Representation ===
Parties can choose to be represented by a lawyer, but may also use a friend or represent themselves.

== Membership ==
Tribunal members include lawyers, professional members (e.g. chartered surveyors), and lay persons. Hearings are presided by chairs, who are always qualified lawyers. The RPTW is led by a president and vice-president, appointed by the Lord Chancellor.

== Divisions ==
The RPTW is split into three divisions:

- Rent Assessment Committees
- Leasehold Valuation Tribunals
- Residential Property Tribunals

These formerly existed in England also (albeit as separate tribunals), but were merged into the First-tier Tribunal from 1 July 2013.

=== Rent assessment committees ===
When hearing disputes regarding fair rent, the RPTW sits as a residential assessment committee (RAC). This consists of two or three tribunal members.

It operates under the provisions of the Rent Act 1977, hearing appeals from a landlord or tenant on the decisions of the local council rent officer on whether the rent charged is fair.

=== Leasehold valuation tribunals ===
The RPTW sitting as a Leasehold Valuation Tribunal hears disputes regarding leaseholds, including service charges, enfranchisement, and recognition of tenants' associations.

=== Residential property tribunals ===
Residential Property Tribunals deal with disputes about:

- Management orders
- Licensing
- Health and safety rating
- Mobile homes

== See also ==
- Residential Property Tribunal Service (former similar English organisation)
- First-tier Tribunal (current English equivalent)
