= Oskar Meder =

German entomologist

Oskar Meder (1877 in Georgenburg, Ostpreußen – 1944 in Kiel) was a German entomologist who specialised in Lepidoptera . He wrote Meder O, 1934 Mitteilungen über Kleinfalter der Nordmark. Internationale entomologische Zeitschrift 27: 489-493 which includes the first description of the micromoth Coleophora arctostaphyli. His collection of Lepidoptera from Schleswig-Holstein is held by the Zoological Museum of the University of Kiel
