= Lew M. Meder House =

Historic house in Nevada, United States

- U.S. National Register of Historic Places
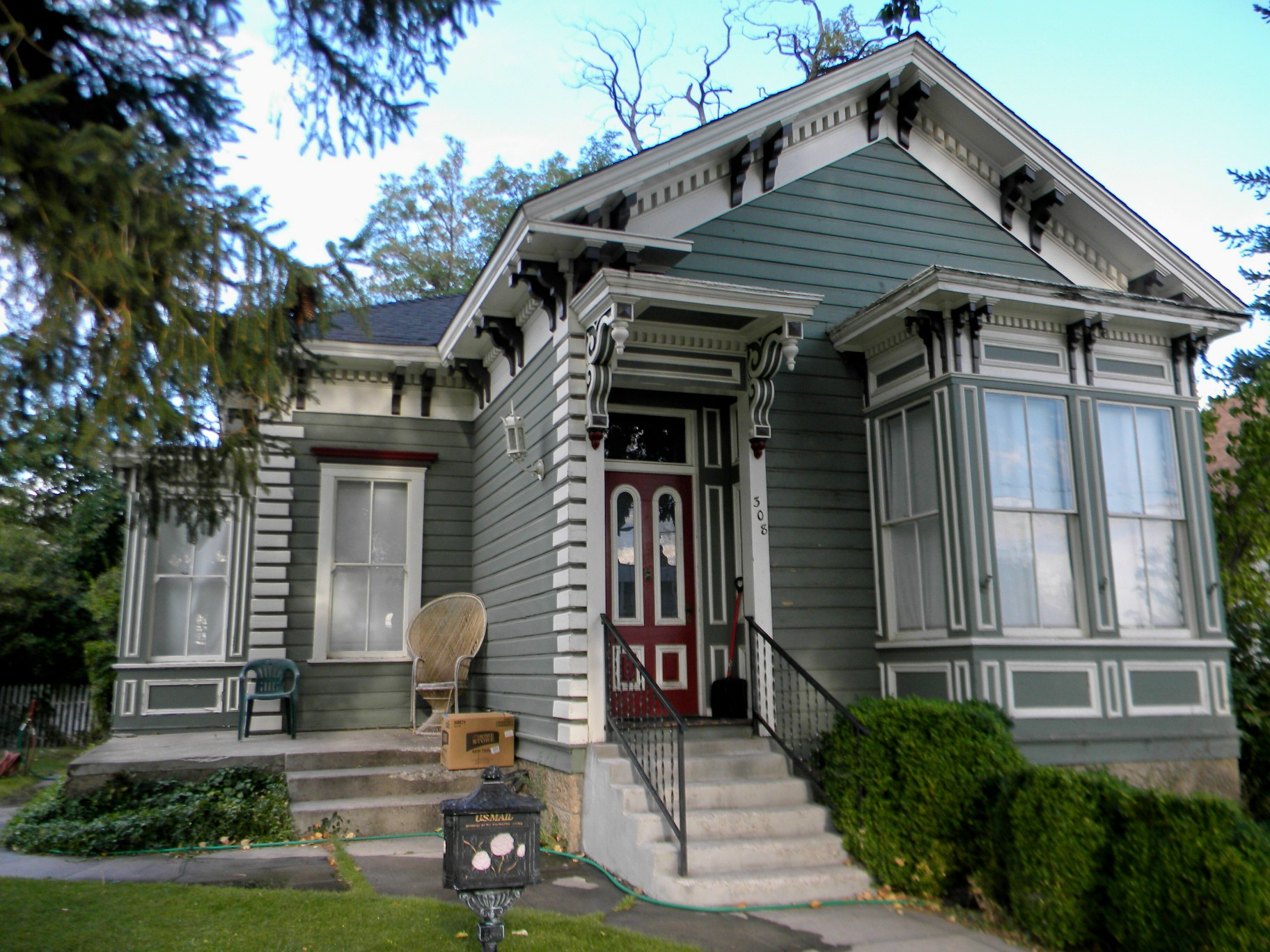

- Location within Nevada Location within the United States
- Location: 308 N. Nevada St., Carson City, Nevada
- Coordinates: 39°9′56″N 119°46′4″W
- Area: 0.5 acres (0.20 ha)
- Built: 1876
- Architectural style: Late Victorian
- NRHP reference No.: 78003075
- Added to NRHP: August 2, 1978

The Lew M. Meder House, at 308 N. Nevada St. in Carson City, Nevada, United States, is a historic house with Late Victorian architecture that was built in 1876. It was listed on the National Register of Historic Places in 1978.

Measured drawings of the house were prepared by the Historic American Buildings Survey. Its NRHP nomination suggests that its NRHP recognition would support designation of a surrounding area as a historic district.
