= Home education in the United Kingdom =

Home education in the United Kingdom is often termed "elective home education" ("EHE") to signify the independent nature of practice from state provisions such as education for children with ill-health provided by the local authority in the family home. EHE is a collective term used in the UK to describe education provided other than through the schooling system. Parents have a duty to ensure their children are educated but the education legislation in England and Wales does not differentiate between school attendance or education otherwise than at school. Scots education legislation on the other hand differentiates between public (state) school provision and education "by other means", which includes both private schooling and home education. The numbers of families retaining direct responsibility for the education of their children has steadily increased since the late 1970s. This increase has coincided with the formation of support groups such as Education Otherwise. Home education may involve an informal style of education described as unschooling, informal learning, natural or autonomous learning. Others prefer to retain a structured school at home approach sometimes referred to as homeschooling (a term more popular in the US) although the terms are often interchanged.

In 2016/17, 48,000 children were being homeschooled in the United Kingdom, up from 34,000 in 2014/15. This number rose to 57,132 in 2018. The number of homeschoolers in the United Kingdom rose by 130 per cent between 2013 and 2018, with the increase varying widely between communities. The Department for Education estimated that in summer 2023 some 97,600 children were being homeschooled.

== England and Wales ==
=== History ===
With the Elementary Education Act 1870 (33 & 34 Vict. c. 75) came attempts to formalise and regulate what had been an ad-hoc schooling system. Campaigners to establish a school system such as the National Education League had argued that schools were for children "not otherwise receiving education" and the 1870 act specified "a reasonable excuse for non-attendance at school : 1. That the child is under efficient instruction in some other manner".

In England and Wales, the law states that all children between the ages of 5 and 16 must receive a full-time suitable education as per their age, ability and aptitude and any special needs they may have must be met, either by regular attendance at school or otherwise.

With the growth of the schooling system came fresh theories and philosophies of education such as those of Johann Heinrich Pestalozzi who would influence the likes of Herbert Spencer who in his essays on education (1854 and 1859) argued against the traditional authoritative classical form of education that disregarded the natural wishes, tendencies, and motives of the child. In turn there were many further pioneers such as Charlotte Mason, Caroline Southwood Hill and Susan Sutherland Isaacs.

Correspondence colleges, latterly online course providers began to make an appearance with Wolsey Hall, Oxford established in 1894 being the oldest.

The twentieth century saw the opening of schools such as Summerhill and Dartington and the establishment of The Peckham Experiment. The government had set up consultative committees chaired by William Henry Hadow. The Hadow reports (1923–1933) with their suggestions such that "a good school 'is not a place of compulsory instruction, but a community of old and young, engaged in learning by cooperative experiment'. laid the foundations for the Education Act 1944 which required that each child be educated according to their individual aptitude and ability either at school or otherwise. The plans for a liberal communal based education system incorporating schools, village halls and community centres floundered against local bureaucracy and finance and offered little more than a tripartite school system which itself would be abandoned as ineffectual in favour of comprehensive schools later to be dismissed as "bog standard".

During the early 1950s Joy Baker became one of the first parents to abandon the school based education system in favour of the otherwise path. She would spend ten years battling with the authorities who insisted her children should attend school. During the early 1970s Dartington school ran a scheme, known as The Terrace, with Yorkshire County Council overseen by Alec Clegg to provide education to pupils who were required to stay on at school due to the raising of the leaving age. The scheme was run by Dick Kitto who had been working at Dartington. Kitto set up an informal democratic system and was impressed by how well the pupils responded to such opportunities. Kitto planned to expand his ideas to cover more schools but he discovered that some parents had already moved beyond his ideas and had decided to abandon schooling for their children altogether. A meeting for these families was organised in the late 70's/early eighties (check date) which would lead to the establishment of Education Otherwise. The meeting included Iris and Geoff Harrison whose fight with the authorities to home educate their five dyslexic children was widely publicised in the media at that time. Education Otherwise is now a charity and organisation that helps families and children with queries relating to home education and resource-related issues. Other organisations such as AHED also exist.

==== Badman Review ====
In 2009, Ed Balls, the Secretary of State for Children, Schools and Families, commissioned Graham Badman, the former Director of Children's Services at Kent County Council, to review current practice of local authorities in relation to home educators, and to investigate if home education was used as a cover for some forms of child abuse.

When published in June 2009, the response was mixed. Balls himself accepted much of the review's recommendations in relation to safeguarding, however many home educators were extremely angry at the recommendation to force all to register. The Children, Schools and Families Select Committee announced its own inquiry into the handling of the Badman Review. It criticised both the Department and the Badman Review and made a number of recommendations against the thrust of the original report.

Although the Department framed legislation to implement much of the review, due to a lack of cross-party support and intense campaigning by home education advocacy groups it was dropped by the Labour administration in the run-up to the 2010 General Election.

== Roles and responsibilities of parents and local authorities ==
The government recognises that education is a fundamental right for every child and that parents have the right to choose to educate their child at home rather than at school. The roles and responsibilities of parents and local authorities in this regard are covered by a document called Elective Home Education: Guidelines For Local Authorities and is published by the Department for Education. These guidelines have statutory standing and following these guidelines is obligatory on local authorities.

The guidelines quote section 7 of The Education Act 1996:

"The parent of every child of compulsory school age shall cause him to receive efficient full-time education suitable (a) to his age, ability and aptitude, and (b) to any special educational needs he may have, either by regular attendance at school or otherwise."

The mention of "otherwise" is what covers education outside of state schools, including home education. The guidelines go on to explain that an efficient education is one that achieves what it sets out to achieve. It needs to prepare the child for adult life in the community of which the child is a member, as well as beyond should they wish to leave the community. Emphasis was formerly placed (section 2.3) on the fact that the education did not need to prepare the child for life in the country as a whole but for life in the community of which the child is a member.

There is no definition of what constitutes a full-time education, but the guidelines accept that education at home may not follow the rigid hours of the school structure and it is difficult to impossible to measure exact hours devoted to it.

Home educating parents are not required to teach the National Curriculum; provide a broad and balanced education; have a timetable; have premises equipped to any particular standard; set hours during which education will take place; have any specific qualifications; make detailed plans in advance; observe school hours, days or terms; give formal lessons; mark work done by their child; formally assess progress or set development objectives; reproduce school type peer group socialisation or match school-based, age-specific standards (section 3.13).

Local authorities have no duty to monitor the quality of home education (section 2.7), have no right to enter the homes of home educators or otherwise see children for the purpose of monitoring their education (section 2.14 - 2.16) and are required to leave home educators to just get on with the job (various sections) unless the LA already has information that the parents are not delivering a suitable education (section 3.4).

Except where the child is registered at a school for children with special needs no permission is required from the school or local authority to deregister the child (section 2.4). Parents can deregister a child from the school system by the simple means of notifying the school in writing (section 3.8). There is no action, notification or deregistration process for those children who have never been to school. When a child reaches the age of five parents can choose to register the child at a school or continue to educate the child at home as they have been doing since the child's birth.

== Regulation and monitoring ==
The law on education otherwise i.e. outside of school, taken together with the "Elective Home Education: Guidelines For Local Authorities" gives local authorities no responsibility, rights or control over home educators. Local authorities cannot require home educators to register, cannot demand regular inspection of the provision or access to the children and cannot seek to control or approve the education provided by parents at home. The only exceptions to some of the above are certain cases of children with special needs where the local authority is charged with providing support.

While local authorities have very little authority over home educators they do have a responsibility to identify children in their locality who are not receiving an education. Many local authorities find this a frustrating conflict and have often complained about their lack of power over home educators. They have done so in their feedback to the Graham Badman review of home education, in their submissions to the All Party Parliamentary Group for Home Education and in other surveys and inquiries. Many claim that unless they can require all home educators to register, and regularly inspect the provision of every home educator, they are unable to effectively deliver on the identification of children not receiving an adequate education. Local authorities sometimes attempt to circumvent the law and force compulsory registration on to home educators and/or otherwise deprive home educators of their legal rights under the pretext of identifying children missing education, according to the Education Select Committee's Fifth Report to Parliament. On numerous occasions, as with Kent County Council, home educators have had to fight back to avoid local authority interference.

Home educators respond to local authority frustrations on identifying children missing an education by pointing to the fact that the law and guidelines give local authorities the option to intervene only when it has already come to the attention of the local authority that a child is not receiving an adequate education, that it was not the intention of the legislators to give local authorities the power to go on "fishing trips" that would impose on all home educators, that any regime of regular inspection of home educators would be hugely expensive while delivering very little value and that local authorities would achieve far more using their resources to improve schools that are not delivering an adequate education. Further, as local authority funding is related to the number of children in school local authorities have a perverse incentive to force home educated children into schools. That local authorities often act outside the law when dealing with home educators and given that the "large majority" of local authorities (all except 30) provide misleading information on their websites in relation to home education (page 23 of The Education Committee's report to Parliament), home educators remain wary of and opposed to any additional powers being awarded to local authorities who many see as anti-home education.

As of March 2023, there are legislative proposals by both Labour and Conservative MPs for a national homeschooling register in order to better understand the exact numbers of homeschooled children as well as to tackle the growing problem of persistent absence from schools. The legislation would require local councils to keep an up-to-date record of all homeschooled pupils.

== Qualifications, higher education, college ==
Just as school is not compulsory, exams and qualifications are not compulsory either. Home educated children often go directly into higher education or vocational courses without first passing through GCSEs and A levels. However, many institutions require proof of secondary level or pre-university level qualifications before admitting a student or providing employment. To meet those requirements home educated children take GCSE or iGCSE exams privately. This option is also available for A levels. While some GCSE subjects require "controlled assessment" at a school, others do not. There is no controlled assessment for iGCSE or A level qualifications.

== Organisations and events ==
Across the UK, including in Scotland and Northern Ireland, local groups of home educating parents run regular meets, events, trips, picnics and camps. At the national level there are organisations and charities such as Education Otherwise and the Schoolhouse Home Education Association advising on matters related to home education.

There are other meets such as the annual AEFES (Alternative Education Festival) which is based in East Sussex UK and is organised by HE children and families. There is also HEFF (Home Educating Families Festival).

=== Scotland ===
The situation in Scotland is slightly different in that if a child is already in school the parent needs to get permission from the local authority to deregister the child, which permission should be granted fairly quickly. No such permission is needed if the child has never attended school. Home education in Scotland is governed by the Scottish Government's Statutory Guidance.

=== Northern Ireland ===
Elective Home Education is legal in Northern Ireland under Section 45 of the Education and Libraries Northern Ireland Order 1986 SI 1986/594 which models English legislation in requiring the education of children of school age "by regular attendance at school or otherwise." There are approximately 500-1000 home educated children in Northern Ireland, but exact numbers are difficult to determine due to the lack of registration. Currently there is no legal requirement for parents to register their children with the Education Board, but a consultation by the Department of Education that started in April 2014 has proposed mandatory registration, home visits, inspection of premises & approval of curriculum. This draft policy by the Department of Education has alarmed home educators by requiring what the law does not, therefore creating the potential for confusion. The consultation is due to end on 27 June 2014. The largest Home Education group in Northern Ireland, HEDNI is actively involved in opposing this change in policy.

== See also ==
- Education in the United Kingdom
- Schoolhouse Home Education Association
- Anti-schooling activism
- Unschooling
- Deschooling
