= Qualifications, Curriculum and Assessment Authority for Wales =

Former public body in Wales

ACCAC (the acronym of Awdurdod Cymwysterau, Cwricwlwm ac Asesu Cymru) was the Qualifications, Curriculum and Assessment Authority for Wales. On 1 April 2006, it merged with the Welsh Assembly Government's new Department for Children, Education, Lifelong Learning and Skills (DCELLS). ACCAC was an exempt charity, and an Assembly Sponsored Public Body responsible for advising the National Assembly for Wales on matters relating to education and qualifications. All external qualifications in Wales were regulated by ACCAC with the exception of NVQs, which QCA is responsible for.

ACCAC was based in Cardiff. Its English equivalent is the Qualifications and Curriculum Authority (QCA).

== See also ==
- Education in Wales
- National Assembly for Wales
