= Medr =

Tertiary education body in Wales

Medr Commission for Tertiary Education and Research
- Y Comisiwn Addysg Drydyddol ac Ymchwil (Welsh)

Sponsored body overview
- Formed: 1 August 2024; 22 months ago
- Preceding Sponsored body: Higher Education Funding Council for Wales
- Type: Welsh Government sponsored body
- Jurisdiction: Welsh Government
- Website: www.medr.cymru/en/

Medr (Welsh for 'skill' / 'ability'), also known as the Commission for Tertiary Education and Research (CTER; Welsh: Y Comisiwn Addysg Drydyddol ac Ymchwil), is a tertiary educational and Welsh Government sponsored body, overseeing post-16 education and research in Wales. It was established in August 2024, replacing the Higher Education Funding Council for Wales and also inheriting some staff and functions from the Welsh Government.

== Background and history ==
In March 2016, a Welsh Government review proposed that the Higher Education Funding Council for Wales (HEFCW) be replaced by a "Tertiary Education Authority", later referred to as a "Tertiary Education and Research Commission for Wales" in 2017, which also backed the scrapping of HEFCW.

Tertiary Education and Research (Wales) Act 2022 (Note: Section 149(1).)
- Act of Senedd Cymru
- Senedd Cymru
- Long title: An Act of Senedd Cymru to establish the Commission for Tertiary Education and Research and to make other provision about tertiary education (which includes higher education, further education and training) and research.
- Citation: 2022 asc 1
- Territorial extent: Wales

Dates
- Royal assent: 8 September 2022
- Commencement: various (Note: Section 148.)

Other legislation
- Amends: Further and Higher Education Act 1992; Education Act 1996; Government of Wales Act 2006; Safeguarding Vulnerable Groups Act 2006

Status: Amended

Text of statute as originally enacted

Revised text of statute as amended

Text of the Tertiary Education and Research (Wales) Act 2022 as in force today (including any amendments) within the United Kingdom, from legislation.gov.uk.

The body was legally established, following the enactment of the Tertiary Education and Research (Wales) Act 2022, on 8 September 2022. The body would be a Welsh Government sponsored body and would replace the Higher Education Funding Council for Wales (HEFCW) when it becomes fully operational in August 2024. The new body would have a much broader role in Welsh education than HEFCW, as HEFCW currently only is responsible for higher education, with CTER gaining additional responsibilities held by the Welsh Government. The body is expected to become the second largest public body in Wales after NHS Wales, have an annual budget of £800 million, and be the first combined higher and further education body in the United Kingdom. The development of the commission, integrating higher and further education oversight, would not lead to the replacement of Estyn, the further education inspector, or the Quality Assurance Agency for Higher Education (QAA), the higher education inspector. The QAA welcomed the proposals.

The commission would be responsible for strategising, funding and overseeing the further education (colleges and sixth-forms), higher education (universities), adult education and adult community learning, apprenticeships and training sectors of the Welsh educational system. The body forms part of the Welsh Government's strategic vision for post-compulsory (post-16) education and training in Wales.

In December 2022, it was announced the commission's board chair would be Julie Lydon, while its board's deputy chair would be David Sweeney.

In July 2023, Jeremy Miles, Minister for Education and Welsh Language, received criticism in his involvement in establishing the commission, in which Miles overrode an agreed selection process for the commission's chief executive, to personally appoint the position himself. Miles stated his decision was a result that the first selection process between November 2022 and February 2023, failed to recommend a candidate for the position. Miles appointed Simon Pirotte, chief executive of Bridgend College.

The organisation began some operations in September 2023. It was originally proposed to be fully operational in April 2024, although in January 2024, its full operation date was delayed to August 2024. Instead, the commission would begin developing plans in April but would only see full transfer of powers from HEFCW in August 2024.

Prior to its operation date of August 2024, it was announced it would be branded as Medr (Welsh for 'skill' / 'ability'; also capitalised as MEDR). It began operations on 1 August 2024, while HEFCW was closed.

== Role ==
The commission is to have the role of establishing a:

- Broader approach to funding research and innovation, taking the entire system into account and to be able to provide funding to various higher and further education institutions.
- Learners' interests protection, ensure the equal value of vocational and academic learning
- Organise education and training sectors to meet employer needs
- Monitor educational performance and governance, while protecting an institution's academic freedom
- Promote and monitor improvement in education and training providers
- Increase the availability of tertiary education delivered in Welsh, and encourage individuals to learn in Welsh

The Tertiary Education and Research (Wales) Act, which established the body, also set out some strategic duties:

- Promote lifelong learning
- Promote the equality of opportunities
- Encourage tertiary education participation
- Promote continuous improvement, collaboration and coherence in the tertiary education and research sectors
- Assist in developing a more sustainable and innovative Welsh economy
- Promoting a civic mission and global outlook
