= Schoolhouse Home Education Association =

Charity based in Scotland

Schoolhouse logo

Schoolhouse Home Education Association, more commonly referred to as Schoolhouse, is a charity based in Scotland which provides support and information to parents about home education in Scotland.

== History ==
Schoolhouse was set up in Dundee in 1996 by parents who identified the shortage of clear, accurate information on home educating in Scotland where the law and practices in relation to Home Education differ significantly from the other nations within the United Kingdom.

Schoolhouse works in close cooperation with its counterpart support organisation Action for Home Education (AHEd) which operates in England, Wales and Northern Ireland.
