= International Business Wales =

- Formation: 2006
- Legal status: Development Agency
- Region served: Wales
- Director: Ian Williams
- Website: ibwales.com
- Remarks: Appointment: Welsh Government

International Business Wales (IBW) is a development agency of the Welsh Government set up with the remit of delivering support to help companies establish themselves in Wales.

== IBW Structure ==
IBW provide the trade and investment arm of the Welsh Government. Established in 2006, it brought together the responsibilities of the former Welsh Development Agency and Wales Trade International.

Sitting under the Department for the Economy and Transport (DE&T) IBW is tasked with developing international trade, and attracting inward investment, relocation and international collaboration.

== Area covered ==
IBW offer support to companies looking at Wales as a business destination for expansion/relocation as well as supporting the companies located in the country with their international trade requirements.

- Inward Investment – project management support to advise companies on all aspects of relocation from grants and skilled workforce availability through to property searches and a relocation service for business people under the “Welcome to Wales” programme.
- International Trade – services for both native Welsh companies and international business looking for a trade partner in Wales, with support from advisors. IBW provide support tailored to company import and export needs.

== 2009 expenses controversy ==
In July 2009, using information obtained from a Freedom of Information request to the Welsh government, the Welsh Liberal Democrats criticised International Business Wales officials for running up a bill of £750,000, on 35 different corporate credit card accounts for the year June 2008 to end of May 2009, at the tax-payers expense. Liberal Democrat leader Kirsty Williams AM said:

"In the middle of a recession it's disgusting to know that public officials are flying first class, staying in the most expensive hotels, eating in the best restaurants - all at the swipe of the Welsh credit card."

First Minister Rhodri Morgan at first refuted the allegation. He later publicly apologised in a letter to Kirsty Williams and said that he had been misled by IBW officials, whom he had believed at the time:

"I stated, on the clear and explicit advice from the relevant senior officials that no officials from IBW (International Business Wales) had flown first class. Today I have learned that this is not the case. I apologise for having misled you and the wider public."

He added that he was setting up an investigation and independent review:

"I need hardly say how disturbed I am by this latest information now to hand. I am instructing the Permanent Secretary to undertake an immediate and thorough investigation and audit of IBW's expenditure and audit systems. This review will be led from outside the Assembly Government."

Following the July 2009 press coverage a group of Welsh exporters have shown their support for International Business Wales, calling on politicians to "stop playing politics" with the organisation. Malcolm Duncan, managing director of Blaenavon-based Super Rod, who heads up the support group said:

"I understand the need for the public to be kept informed about the activities of any Government department. But what does worry me is when politicians start to play politics with these departments, that could ultimately have a detrimental effect on both business and our economy as a whole."

== "Economic Renewal: a new direction" ==
On Monday 5 July 2010 the Welsh Assembly Government announced plans to transform the way it supports businesses and the Welsh economy. "Economic Renewal: a new direction" is a vision to make Wales "one of the best places in the world to live, to work and to thrive".

As part of the transformation, functions previously supported by International Business Wales, Trade and Inward investment, can be accessed directly through the Welsh Government; or by visiting the Trade and Inward investment website or calling (+44) 1443 845500.
