= Higher Education Funding Council for Wales =

Former Welsh education funding provider

- Cyngor Cyllido Addysg Uwch Cymru (Welsh)

Sponsored body overview
- Dissolved: 31 July 2024; 21 months ago
- Superseding Sponsored body: Medr
- Type: Welsh Government sponsored body
- Jurisdiction: Welsh Government
- Website: www.hefcw.ac.uk/en

The Higher Education Funding Council for Wales (HEFCW) was the Welsh Government Sponsored Body responsible for funding the higher education sector. It was replaced by Medr, the Commission for Tertiary Education and Research from August 2024.

== Functions ==
HEFCW distributes funds for education, research and related activities at Wales's higher education institutions, and funds the teaching activities of the Open University in Wales. It also funds higher education courses at further education colleges.

The body uses resources from the Welsh Government and others to:

- secure higher education learning and research of the highest quality;
- make the most of the contribution of higher education to the culture, society and economy or Wales;
- distribute to universities and colleges the tuition fee grant for Welsh domiciled full-time undergraduates; and
- ensure high quality, accredited teacher training across Wales.

These activities contribute to enhancing social justice and supporting a buoyant economy.

HEFCW has identified the following in its Corporate Strategy as the areas on which it will primarily work:

- Widening access: ensuring equity, opportunity and success in higher education.
- Student experience: ensuring that the student learning experience is of high quality.
- Skills: ensuring that all graduates are equipped for the world of work and for their role as citizens.
- Knowledge transfer: ensuring more productive relationships between higher education institutions and public/private sectors, local communities and other agencies.
- Research: ensuring improved research performance to underpin the knowledge economy and cultural and social renewal.
- Reconfiguration and Collaboration: delivering a reconfigured higher education system with strong providers that, through partnership working, particularly regionally, offers more accessible higher education opportunities.
- Governance: delivering continual improvement in the quality of governance and long term sustainability of the higher education system.

All Welsh universities that want to charge tuition fees above the basic fee level (£4000 for a full-time undergraduate student for the year 2012/13) must first seek approval from HEFCW through submitting a 'fee plan' which satisfies certain requirements in relation to widening access and inclusion.

== Background and status ==
The Higher Education Funding Council for Wales (HEFCW) was established in May 1992 under the Further and Higher Education Act 1992. HEFCW's responsibilities for initial teacher training (ITT), including the accreditation of ITT providers, are covered under the Education (School Teachers' Qualifications) (Wales) Regulations 2004 and the Education Act 2005.

As a Welsh Government Sponsored Body, HEFCW receives its funds from, and is accountable to, the Welsh Government. At the same time, HEFCW provides advice to the Welsh Government on the funding needs, aspirations and concerns of the higher education sector. HEFCW also promotes Welsh interests in the wider UK higher education arena.

Around 45 members of staff work for HEFCW's Executive, which is based in Bedwas, Caerphilly County Wales. HEFCW is governed by a Council of up to 12 members, including the Chairman, Mr David Allen, and the Chief Executive, Dr David Blaney.

It was replaced by Medr, the Commission for Tertiary Education and Research from August 2024.
