= Homeschooling international status and statistics =

Overview of the legal situation and prevalence of homeschooling around the world

Legality of homeschooling: Legal without known restrictions Legal, subject to registration or lax restrictions Legal with restrictions Partially legal or de jure legal^{1} Illegal with (virtually) no exceptions^{2} Legal status unknown/unclear 1: Legality varies by grade, age, location, or personal circumstances. 2: Exceptions may include medical reasons although even then it is rarely permitted.

The legality of homeschooling varies in many countries. Countries with the most prevalent homeschooling movements include Australia, Canada, New Zealand, the United Kingdom, and the United States. Some countries have highly regulated homeschooling programs as an extension of the compulsory school system; others, such as Germany, have outlawed it entirely. In some other countries, while not restricted by law, homeschooling is not socially acceptable, or is considered undesirable, and is virtually non-existent.

== Status of homeschooling across continents ==
=== Africa ===
Country	Status	Estimated	Ref.
Botswana	Legal		
Sierra Leone	Illegal, public education is mandatory without known exceptions.		
South Africa	Legal as alternative to the mandatory public school system.	Estimated between 30,000 and 100,000 children	

=== North America ===
Country or region	Status	Statistics	Ref.
Canada	Legal under regulating conditions (Alberta – regulation, British Columbia – registration, Manitoba – permit, Newfoundland – permit, New Brunswick – permit, Northwest Territories – regulation, Nova Scotia – regulation, Ontario – regulation, Prince Edward Island – regulation, Quebec – permit, Saskatchewan – permit, Yukon – regulation)	100,000 children	
Greenland	Illegal, public education is mandatory without known exceptions.	Virtually no homeschooling*	
United States	Legal under regulating conditions, varies by state.	Around 4 million children	
Guatemala	Illegal, public education is mandatory without known exceptions.	Unknown	
Mexico	Legal as long as the student is registered, which can be a lengthy bureaucratic process. Compulsory attendance laws are unclear.	Unknown	

=== Latin America and the Caribbean ===
Country or region	Status	Statistics	Ref.
Belize	Expats have right to homeschool. Compulsory attendance is unclear for citizens.	Unknown	
Brazil	Legal. The supreme court deemed homeschooling constitutional, but pending legalization. Some states and cities already legalized it. Federal legislation is still pending.	35,000 students	
Chile	Legal. Freedom of education is guaranteed by the constitution. Prior registration with the Ministerio de Educación is required.	8,000-15,000 students	
Colombia	Legal. Regulated by the Ministry of Education and the ICFES. The student would have to present a Public Validation Test and a State Test if they want to go to college.	Unknown	
Costa Rica	Illegal, public or private education is mandatory without known exceptions.		
Cuba	Illegal, public education is mandatory without known exceptions.	Virtually no homeschooling*	
El Salvador	Legal		
Panama	Unclear, for it is neither legal nor illegal.	There are a number of families who are currently homeschooling	
Peru	Legal. Prior registration with the Ministry of Education is required.	Unknown	
Suriname	Legal.	Virtually no homeschooling*	
Trinidad and Tobago	Legal.	Unknown	

=== Asia ===
Country or region	Status	Statistics	Ref.
Armenia	Illegal, public education is mandatory without known exceptions.	Virtually no homeschooling*	
Azerbaijan	Legal with "moderate" regulation.		
China	Illegal, but without an identity card (Hukou) it is not possible to register at public schools and parents must arrange for private schooling. Legal in Hong Kong.		
Cyprus	Illegal, public education is mandatory without known exceptions.	Virtually no homeschooling*	
Georgia	Illegal, public education is mandatory without known exceptions.	Virtually no homeschooling*	
India	Legal as alternative to the mandatory public school system	2000 children	
Indonesia	Legal as alternative to the mandatory public school system.	40,000 children	
Iran	Illegal, primary school education is compulsory without known exceptions.	Unknown	
Israel	Legal under regulating conditions	500 children as of 2016/14	חינוך ביתי בישראל
Kazakhstan	Not illegal, but not provided by law. Legal and provided for gifted and disabled students. Door to door checks conducted regularly. Legal for non-residents.	Many immigrant families homeschool	
Philippines	Legal	More than 10,000	
Malaysia	Legal with regulation		
North Korea	Illegal, public education is mandatory with no known exceptions.	Unknown	
Russia	Legal since 1992, law sometimes ignored. Every homeschooled child must be enrolled into a state-licensed school (can be a private school), and does not have to pass annual exams. Homeschooled children received diplomas from supervising school.	50,000–100,000	
Singapore	Legal with regulation including needing an exemption	50 per year	
South Korea	Illegal by law, but law is unclear and the cause is supported by business leaders, therefore homeschoolers do not generally experience issues with authorities.	2000 Students	
Taiwan	Legal since 2011	1000 Children	
Thailand	Legal since 2004	1000 Children	
Turkey	Illegal, public and private education is mandatory without known exceptions.	Possible, but not likely*	
United Arab Emirates	Legal, as alternative to the mandatory public school system.	2000 children*	

=== Europe ===
Country or region	Status	Statistics	Ref.
Albania	Legal with regulation after passing of new law in 2012		
Andorra	Illegal, public education is mandatory without known exceptions.	Virtually no homeschooling*	
Armenia	Illegal, public education is mandatory without known exceptions.	Virtually no homeschooling*	
Austria	Legal under restrictive conditions, homeschooling is allowed as long as the instruction is equal to that of the state school.	2,500 Children	
Azerbaijan	Legal with "moderate" regulation		
Belarus	Illegal, public education is mandatory without known exceptions.	Virtually no homeschooling*	
Belgium	Legal under restrictive conditions, Homeschooling is a constitutional right in Belgium.	500	
Bosnia and Herzegovina	Illegal, public education is mandatory without known exceptions.	Virtually no homeschooling*	
Bulgaria	Illegal, public education is mandatory. Only children with special needs may be homeschooled under strict government control.	Fewer than 100 families	
Croatia	Illegal, public education is mandatory without known exceptions.	Virtually no homeschooling*	WP
Cyprus	Illegal, public education is mandatory without known exceptions.	Virtually no homeschooling*	
Czech Republic	Legal under restrictive conditions by law as an alternative (for "serious reasons" ) for primary school. National curriculum examinations are mandatory twice a year.	2,500 families	
Denmark	Legal, homeschooling is allowed as long as the instruction is equal to that of the state school. The inspections are controlled by the local district public school or a third-party inspector.	min. 1.238 children (school year 2020–2021)	WP
Estonia	Legal under the control of the school. An authorized school must supervise every homeschooled child (can be a private school) and pass annual exams. Homeschooled children receive diplomas from supervising schools.	Fewer than 100	WP
Finland	Legal as an alternative to the mandatory public school system. Written and oral examinations to check on progress are mandatory.	400–600	WP
France	Legal as an alternative to the mandatory public school system, but subject to very harsh authorizations and yearly inspections since the 2022 law on separatism.	63 000 (February 2021)	
Georgia	Illegal, public education is mandatory without known exceptions.	Virtually no homeschooling*	
Germany	Illegal, public, or approved private education is mandatory with the only exception being where continued school attendance would create undue hardship for an individual child.	400	WP
Greece	Illegal, public education is mandatory without known exceptions.	Virtually no homeschooling*	
Hungary	Legal, Homeschooling has been practically banned since 2019, but is permitted in exceptional cases. There is no law against homeschooling per se, but approval from the authorities is necessary.	7673 (2017)	
Iceland	Legal only for holders of teaching certificates, in other cases public education is mandatory.	Unknown	WP
Ireland	Legal, homeschooling is allowed by the Constitution.	1100	WP
Italy	Legal, homeschooling is allowed by the Constitution.	11,000 families	WP
Latvia	Legal under the control of the school. An authorized school must supervise every homeschooled child (can be a private school) and pass annual exams. Homeschooled children receive diplomas from supervising schools.	Fewer than 100 families	
Liechtenstein	Legal, in Liechtenstein, homeschooling is possible under certain conditions and requires approval from the school authorities in Vaduz.		
Lithuania	Legal under the control of the school. An authorized school must supervise every homeschooled child (can be a private school) and pass annual exams. Homeschooled children receive diplomas from supervising schools.	Virtually no homeschooling*	
Luxembourg	Legal	Unknown	
Malta	Illegal, public education is mandatory without known exceptions.	Virtually no homeschooling*	
Moldova	Not illegal	100–200	
Montenegro	Illegal, public education is mandatory without known exceptions.	Virtually no homeschooling*	WP
Netherlands	Illegal, public, or private education is mandatory, with some exceptions.	2475 children exempt* (2023–2024)	WP
North Macedonia	Illegal, public education is mandatory without known exceptions.	Virtually no homeschooling*	
Norway	Legal under restrictive conditions, homeschooling is allowed as long as the instruction is equal to that of the state school.	400+	
Poland	Legal under restrictive conditions. Every home-schooled child must be supervised by an authorized school (can be a private school) and pass annual exams. Homeschooled children receive diplomas from supervising schools. In fact, exams are a formality, they take place online, and all students receive grades around the maximum. No one checks whether students are actually learning.	54836 (Feb 2024)	
Portugal	Legal. Children living longer than 4 months in Portugal must attend school by law. Home education under the Portuguese national curriculum only. Mandatory annual exams in Portuguese.	1,000 families	
Romania	Legal under restrictive conditions. Children with disabilities, special needs or whose condition does not allow them to be physically present in a school may be home-schooled, under the supervision of an accredited teacher. Foreign Curriculum can be studied, overseen by an umbrella school from abroad.	500	
Russia	Legal since 1992, law sometimes ignored. Every homeschooled child must be enrolled in a state-licensed school (can be a private school), and does not have to pass annual exams. Homeschooled children received diplomas from supervising schools.	50,000–100,000	
San Marino	Illegal, public education is mandatory without known exceptions.	Virtually no homeschooling*	
Serbia	Legal, only children who cannot attend school for health reasons.	Unknown	
Slovakia	Legal, under conditions. Only 6-15 year olds are allowed to attend.	Several hundred	
Slovenia	Legal	Unknown	
Spain	Unknown, as the Constitution recognizes freedom of education, national education law stipulates that compulsory education must be met through school attendance.	About 2,000 families	
Sweden	Illegal, as of June 2010; supposedly allowed under special circumstances such as student health reasons or family travel, but virtually never approved. When compulsory schooling ends at 16, can deregister from school and return to homeschooling. Many Swedish homeschooling families emigrated to the neighboring provinces of Åland (Finland) and Bornholm (Denmark).	200 families — half legally	
Switzerland	Legal in about three quarters of the cantons, with many being restrictive to very restrictive.	4136 Children	
Turkey	Illegal, public, and private education is mandatory without known exceptions.	Possible, but not likely*	
Ukraine	Legal but heavily regulated	200 families	
United Kingdom	Legal as an alternative to the mandatory state school system.	57,132	
Vatican City	No indication for educational laws to exist were found.	Unknown	

=== Oceania ===
Country or region	Status	Statistics	Ref.
Australia	Legal as alternative to the mandatory public school system.	30,000 (including distance learners)	See main article
New Zealand	Legal as alternative to the mandatory public school system.	6,008 (1 July 2017)	See main article

== Legality by country or region ==
=== Africa ===
==== Kenya ====
Status: Contentious

Homeschooling is currently permitted in Kenya.

The freedom of homeschooling is however under threat in Kenya, because a new education law has been proposed that does not make any allowance for homeschooling.

==== South Africa ====
Status: Legal

During apartheid, home education was illegal in South Africa. The parents Andre and Bokkie Meintjies were jailed in 1994 and their children were placed in orphanages for educating their children at home. However, a few years later, the Mandela government legalised home education with the publication of the South African School Act in 1996. Since it was legalised, homeschooling has the fastest growing education model in the country.

Homeschooling is legal according to South African national law, but individual provinces have the authority to set their own restrictions. The SA Schools Act (art. 51) requires parents to register their children for education at home. In practice however, most provincial departments do not have the administrative capability to register children for home education. Some of the larger provincial departments have limited administrative capabilities to register children for home education as well as a lack of follow up capacity, resulting in a serious miscommunication between government and citizens. As a result of this situation, more than 90% of homeschooling parents do not register with the department. Since home education was legalised, it has grown exponentially. According to the census count of 2011, there were about 57,000 home learners in the country, putting South Africa in the top five countries in terms of number of home learners.

=== Americas ===
==== Argentina ====
Status: Permission required

Article 129 of the National Education Law in Argentina states that parents must ensure that their children attend school. Children can be homeschooled, but parents need to apply for permission from the Provincial Council of Education.

The law pertaining to homeschooling permissions is Article 26 of the Regulatory Decree 572/62, where the home is mentioned as one of the possible ways to ensure compulsory education of children.

==== Brazil ====
Status: Unregulated

Homeschooling is not explicitly illegal in Brazil, it is currently considered a grey area due to a lack of specific federal legislation regulating it; meaning parents can face legal challenges if they homeschool their children without adhering to state-specific rules and requirements, which can vary significantly depending on the region. A rough estimate by the National Association of Home Education, founded in 2010, stated that around 3,201 families were homeschooling in 2016. Another estimate by Brazil's Ministry of Education stated that, in 2021, there were at least 35,000 students schooled at home. Interest in homeschooling has grown 36% each year.

The Supreme court deemed homeschooling constitutional, but a more specific legislation was needed. The state of Paraná and the Distrito Federal have already legalized homeschooling. The state of Rio Grande do Sul approved a law legalizing homeschooling, but the law was vetoed by the state governor. Federal legislation is pending.

In 1824, Brazil permitted home education to take the place of traditional education for nearly 70 years. Many proposals were made in regards to the homeschooling regulations, but many of them were rejected. In 1990, however, the Estatuto da Criança e Adolescente did not recognize it explicitly as a form of education, questioning its legality.

A couple, a Brazilian mother and an American father, was investigated in 2010 by the municipal government of Serra Negra, São Paulo, for homeschooling their children. The local authorities were tipped off by an anonymous source because the couple's two daughters did not attend school. The Public Ministry expected to reach an agreement with the family to enlist the children in formal schools.

In 2011, Bill 3518/08, which would have evaluated homeschooling in the country, was rejected. In 2013, there was another a proposal with Bill 3179/12. That same year, a resurgence in the homeschooling movement encouraged congressman Lincoln Portela to introduce a new bill that would allow children to be educated at home if parents followed state approved guidelines. At the time, the federal Supreme Court had never made a pronouncement on homeschooling, making its legality unclear. However, in 2018 the Supreme Court ruled that homeschooling was constitutional, and determined that legislation should be written to regulate the practice. In 2019 a new law project was created to legalize homeschooling in the country with annual exams.

==== Canada ====
Status: Legal, regulated in some provinces

Homeschooling has always been legal in all provinces and territories in Canada. The Ontario Education Act, for example, states in Section 21(2)(a) that "A person is excused from attendance at school if [...] the person is receiving education elsewhere". Canada is known as having some of the most comprehensive legal protections for homeschooling parents in the Americas. Approximately 1% to 2% of North American children are homeschooled, which includes about 60,000 in Canada.

==== United States ====
Status: Legal

Year	Homeschooled students (millions)	Percentage change since 1999
1999	0.85	–
2003	1.10	+29.4%
2007	1.50	+76.5%
2012	1.77	+108.2%
2016	2.30	+170.6%
2019	2.50	+194.1%
2020	2.65	+211.8%
2021	3.70	+335.3%
2022	4.30	+405.9%

In "The Condition of Education 2000–2009", the National Center for Education Statistics of the United States Department of Education reported that in 2007, the number of homeschooled students was about 1.5 million, an increase from 850,000 in 1999 and 1.1 million in 2003. The percentage of the school-age population that was homeschooled increased from 1.7 percent in 1999 to 2.9 percent in 2007. The increase in the percentage of homeschooled students from 1999 to 2007 represents a 74 percent relative increase over the 8-year period and a 42 percent relative increase since 2003. In 2007, the majority of homeschooled students received all of their education at home (84 percent), but some attended school up to 25 hours per week. Currently, many also participate in homeschool cooperatives as well as utilize the resources of private tutors and community college-based programs, which allow students to earn college credits before attending college.

According to the US National Center for Education Statistics, homeschooling increased in popularity in the United States during the 2000s; the percentage of children ages 5 through 17 who were homeschooled increased from 1.7% in 1999 to 3% in 2011/12. The study found that 83 percent were White, 5 percent were Black, 7 percent were Hispanic, and 2 percent were Asian or Pacific Islander. As of 2019, there are about 1.8 million homeschooled students in the United States. The NHES 2016 found the highest rate of homeschooling among parents who had not completed high school, followed by parents with bachelor's degrees.

==== Uruguay ====
Status: Legal

Article 68 of the Uruguayan Constitution states each parent has the right to choose the teachers or schools relative to their child's education. In 2009, Article 7, Section 2 of the LGE called into question whether “home schooling” was possible in Uruguay, since it stated that “Fathers, mothers, or legal guardians of boys, girls, and adolescents have the obligation to register them in a school and watch over their attendance and learning". However, in 2020, Article 7 was amended to make homeschooling a viable option, "... in accordance with the provisions of the first paragraph of article 70 of the Constitution of the Republic and the provisions of this law."

=== Asia ===
==== Israel ====
Status: Permission required

Homeschooling is legal in Israel, and requires permission from the Ministry of Education. The permission involves a home visit from the person in charge of handing out the permissions, and writing a letter describing the motives, curriculum, daily routine and socialization of the children. Unschooling is legal, and the requirements are minimal. There is unclear information regarding the number of homeschooling families in Israel, since not all families ask for permission, and many homeschool their children without enlisting. Estimates range between 500 and 1000 families.

==== People's Republic of China ====
Status: Deemed illegal for citizens without approval, but no restrictions for foreign students.

Under China's education laws, children are required to enroll in the school system from age seven and attend for nine years. No specific regulations exist for home-schooling, though it can be allowed subject to approval as a non-governmental organization. Despite its legal status, some parents in China opt for home-schooling for reasons including dissatisfaction with the country's test-oriented public schools and a desire to individualize the education of their children. There are no official figures for home-schooling, though one survey found that 18,000 children received homeschooling in the People's Republic of China, while an education policy researcher at Beijing Normal University estimated the portion of students receiving home-schooling at less than one percent. In 2017 a survey found about 6,000 families homeschooled their children, an annual rise of about 33%. Officials are divided on addressing home-schooling, with many supporting its legalization and others supporting compelling students to return to the regular school system. Education experts generally support allowing home-schooling, but call for the creation of national standards.

==== Hong Kong ====
Status: Legal

Homeschooling in Hong Kong is not against the law. This has been confirmed by the previous Permanent Secretary of the Education Bureau, Cherry Tse Ling Kit Ching and also raised by Legislator Dennis Kwok at a meeting of the Legislative Council. The EDB treats homeschooling on a case-by-case basis. However, many people in Hong Kong think that homeschooling is illegal in Hong Kong, so only a few people were taught at home.

==== India ====
Status: Legal

In India, under Right to education, The Ministry of Human Resource Development (MHRD), the Government has established an independent body to look after the system of Home Schooling. It is in fact, an open schooling system where students can learn anywhere and appear for examinations conducted by NIOS (National Institute of Open Schooling). 0.5 million take admission every year, and 2.71 million took admission during last 5 years through Open Schooling of Indian Govt. (MHRD).

==== Indonesia ====
Status: Legal

Homeschooling in Indonesia (Indonesian: Pendidikan Rumah) is regulated under National Education System 2003 under division of informal education. This enables the children of homeschooling to attend an equal National Tests to obtain an "Equivalent Certificate". The homeschooling is recently becoming a trend in upper-middle to upper-class families with highly educated parents with capability to provide better tutoring or expatriate families living far away from International School. Since 2007 the Indonesia's National Education Department took efforts in providing training for homeschooling tutors and learning media, even though the existence of this community is still disputed by other non-formal education operators.

Iran

Status: Illegal

In Iran, primary school education is compulsory. Education is free until the end of high school, but it is not compulsory.

==== Japan ====
Status: Not formally permitted; often allowed

School attendance is compulsory but the fine for non attendance is rarely applied and amounts to less than ten thousand yen. The authorities encourage futoko (school refusal) children to receive schooling in alternative ways including home education.

==== Singapore ====
Status: Legal, regulated for citizens

Primary education is compulsory under the Compulsory Education Act since 2003. Exemptions are made for pupils who are homeschooling, attending a full-time religious institution or those with special needs who are unable to attend mainstream schools. However, parents have to meet the requirements set out by the Ministry of Education before these exemptions are granted. Students have to take a test at Primary 4 to determine whether they could remain homeschooled.

Parents of Singaporean children who wish to homeschool need to apply to MOE to seek exemption from compulsory education; this requirement is not applicable to expatriates.

==== Taiwan (Republic of China) ====
Status: Legal

Homeschooling in Taiwan, Republic of China is legally recognized since 1982 and regulated as a possible form of special education since 1997.

==== Thailand ====
Status: Heavily regulated

Homeschooling used to be heavily restricted from the misunderstanding of the concerned Area Based Officers because they have worked only for the school in the different rules and regulations for a long time. As of 2016, the Homeschooling Network of the Thai Alternative Education Council Association (a Non-Profit Organization) is connecting together around the country to help the parents perform the registration following as National Education Laws and also working together with the National Human Rights Commission of Thailand to protect parents' rights. Additionally, the online communication can promote the Rights of the parents to choose any suitable education for their children as the International Covenant on Economic, Social and Cultural Rights (ICESCR) said, especially for Homeschool Concept.

==== Turkey ====
Status: Illegal

In the Republic of Turkey, all children are required to be registered in state or private school so as to be in compliance with the National Education Basic Law (No. 1739, 06–14–1973, Article 22). Distance education is also available through Turkey's national television channels. Through this particular option, students go to a particular test site and take examinations based on what they have studied. In Turkey, parents who fail to send their children to school are charged as criminals, which at times may result in their incarceration. Due to the above legal constraints, Turkish parents face a great deal of difficulty in pursuing homeschooling for their children.

=== Europe ===
==== Austria ====
Status: Regulated

Homeschooling is legal in Austria. Since the Provisorischen Gesetz über den Privatunterricht from 27 June 1850 there is no need to have a teacher exam for teaching children. The homeschooling has to be announced by §11 SchPfl (1985) to Landesschulrat, since 2019 to Bezirksdirektion. They can decide within one month to reject the homeschooling, if it is predictable that the children will not learn the same as in school. The parents then can challenge this at the same site (Berufung).

However, every homeschooled child is required to take an exam per year (Externisten-Prüfung) in a school, to ensure that students are being educated at an appropriate level. Children failing the test must attend a school the following year. The same test is also required by children in private schools without government rights (Öffentlichkeitsrecht).

The parents have to enroll the children on Einschreibungszeit (enrolment time), usually in the first weeks of January at that Schulsprengel, that has to fulfill Unterrichtspflicht from 1 September on. Inscription dates were published at the school, while it is not clear on which law it is based. The Schulsprengel ist described by state law for each Dorf, Weiler, Gemeinde, Stadt (city, sector, land, district).

In the school year 2012/2013, there were 1820 homeschooled children in Austria. In the year 2017/2018, the number rose to 2320.

==== Belgium ====
Status: Regulated

Homeschooling is legal in Belgium and considered a constitutional right. Children have to be registered as home-educated if they do not attend a school. Education is compulsory in Belgium, but not school attendance.

In Flanders, the Dutch-speaking part of the country, children need to be registered for exams before age 12. If the parents fail to do so, the child is required to attend school. Those who are registered need to pass specific exams at age 13 and 15. If they fail one of those exams two times the parents need to register their child in a certified school. In the French Community of Belgium, they are tested at 8, 10, 12, and 14. The tests are new and there is still a lot of confusion on the tests and the legal situation around them.

==== Croatia ====
Status: Illegal

Home education was legal in Croatia in 1874 when Croatian law stated that parents have a duty to educate their children either at home or by sending them to school. The child had to pass an exam in a public school at the end of every school year.

The primary education in Croatia is compulsory from the age of six to fifteen and it spans eight grades.

In September 2010 a religious organisation Hrvatska kršćanska koalicija (Croatian Christian Coalition) submitted a proposal to change the law so home education would become legal in Croatia. The civil organization Obrazovanje na drugi način (Another Way of Education) joined in and is now working on its own proposal.

The proposed model is based on Slovenian and Montenegrin model of home education. The child is required to enroll into a local school (public or private) and pass an annual exam in certain subjects (mother tongue and math only in lower grades; with addition of foreign language in middle grades and more subjects in higher grades). If the child does not pass all the exams in two attempts, it is ordered to continue the education with regular school attendance. Every year the parents have to notify the school by the end of May that they will be educating their child at home.

Like in the case of Slovenia and Montenegro, the proposed model does not impose any limitation on who can home educate. The parents educating their children at home are not eligible to receive any kind of state help. The schools are free to choose whether they will allow special arrangements with children educated at home (flexi-schooling, the use of school resources, participation in field trips and other school activities, etc.). The Ministry of Education and schools are not required to provide any form of help to parents of children educated at home (teacher guides, worksheets, consultation, etc.).

The proposed model was chosen as it requires minimal change to the existing law and would be possible to implement within the current educational framework. The Croatian Constitution, in the Article 63 paragraph 1, states that parents have a duty to school their children. Similarly, in the Article 65 paragraph 1, it states that primary schooling is compulsory and free. It is deeply ingrained in Croatian culture that education cannot happen without schooling.

As of July 2011 there are three alternative primary schools in Croatia – one Montessori and two Steiner Waldorf schools. Alternative schools in Croatia are required to follow national curriculum (Article 26 paragraph 1, Article 30).

==== Czech Republic ====
Status: Heavily regulated

The Ministry of Education began an experiment on September 1, 1998, in which home education was made a legal alternative for students in the first five years of elementary school. In 2004 home education, referred to as Individual Education, was enshrined in the Education Act for children within that age group. On September 1, 2007, a new experiment began allowing the home education of children up to the 9th grade.

==== Denmark ====
Status: Heavily regulated

It follows from § 76 in the Danish constitution that homeschooling is legal. All children must be educated for 10 years. The education can be received at home or in private school, but must meet the requirements of what is commonly required in government schools. Inspections are mandatory.

==== Finland ====
Status: Regulated

Homeschooling in Finland is legal but uncommon (400–600 children). The parents are responsible for the child getting the compulsory education and the advancements are supervised by the home municipality. The parents have the same freedom to make up their own curriculum as the municipalities have regarding the school, only national guiding principles of the curriculum have to be followed.

Choosing homeschooling means that the municipality is not obliged to offer school books, health care at school, free lunches or other privileges prescribed by the law on primary education, but the ministry of education reminds they may be offered.

==== France ====
Status: Heavily regulated

Home education is legal in France and requires the child to be registered with two authorities, the 'Inspection Académique' and the local town hall (Mairie).

Since September 2019, compulsory education starts from the age of three, meaning annual inspections now commence at that age.

Every other year, the mayor verifies the reasons the family home educates and confirms that the training provided is consistent with the health of the child. Only a narrow range of reasons are accepted. Parents are also subject to annual inspections if they are teaching children between the ages of three and 16. Two consecutive unsatisfactory outcomes of these inspections can mean the parents will have to send their children to a mainstream school.

While homeschooling parents are free to teach their children in any way they like, the children must remain at a skill level on par with those in mainstream schools at their yearly inspections. Since 2022, education must also be primarily provided in the French language. Children are expected to master the seven key competencies of the common foundation of competence by the end of their legal schooling obligation. The key competencies are:

- written and spoken French
- mathematics, basic science and technology
- at least one foreign language
- French, European and World history and geography & art
- computer science
- social and civic competences
- initiative and autonomy

Homeschooled children must also demonstrate that they can:

- ask questions
- make deductions from their own observations and documents
- be able to reason
- generate ideas, be creative and produce finished work
- use computers
- use resources sensibly
- evaluate risks

French organisations involved in homeschooling include Les Enfants D'Abord, LAIA (Libre d'Apprendre et d'Instruire Autrement), CISE (Choisir d'Instruire Son Enfant) and Hors Des Murs.

==== Germany ====
Status: Illegal

Homeschooling is illegal in Germany with rare exceptions. Mandatory school attendance has been in place since 1919, when the Schulpflicht was introduced. The requirement to attend school has been upheld, on challenge from parents, by the Federal Constitutional Court of Germany. Parents violating the law have primarily or most prominently been Christians seeking a more religious education than that offered by the schools. Sanctions against these parents have included fines of thousands of euros, successful legal actions to remove children from the parents' custody, and prison sentences. It has been estimated that 600 to 1,000 children in Germany are homeschooled, despite its illegality. Meanwhile, homeschooling is legal in Austria and Switzerland.

Up until 1919, homeschooling in Germany was seen as an acceptable practice under certain circumstances, but more for higher class people. Many states developed school systems before, and with the rise of the Weimar Republic some reforms were proposed. In the Nazi regime, homeschooling was seen as an anti-nationalistic and subversive practice that could undermine children's loyalty to their country. The Reichsschulpflichtgesetz (Law on Compulsory Education in the German Reich), which was implemented in 1938 and is one of the very few Nazi laws still followed in present-day Germany, effectively banned all homeschooling with criminal consequences for anyone found practicing.

In 1989, Helmut Stücher removed his children from the public school system to begin homeschooling. Stücher and others who followed suit were fined, and some even lost child custody. He founded a private school, the Philadelphia-Schule in Siegen. The discussion in politics about this school were very rough.

In a legal case commenced in 2003 at the European Court of Human Rights, a homeschooling parent couple argued on behalf of their children that Germany's compulsory school attendance endangered their children's religious upbringing, promoted teaching inconsistent with their Christian faith–especially the German state's mandates relating to sex education in the schools—and contravened the declaration in the Charter of Fundamental Rights of the European Union that "the State shall respect the right of parents to ensure education and teaching is in conformity with their own religious and philosophical convictions".

In September 2006, the European Court of Human Rights upheld the German ban on homeschooling, stating "parents may not refuse... [compulsory schooling] on the basis of their convictions", and adding that the right to education "calls for regulation by the State". The European Court took the position that the plaintiffs were the children, not their parents, and declared "children are unable to foresee the consequences of their parents' decision for home education because of their young age.... Schools represent society, and it is in the children's interest to become part of that society. The parents' right to educate does not go as far as to deprive their children of that experience."

The European Court endorsed a "carefully reasoned" decision of the German court concerning "the general interest of society to avoid the emergence of parallel societies based on separate philosophical convictions and the importance of integrating minorities into society."

In January 2010, a United States immigration judge granted asylum to a German homeschooling family Romeike, apparently based on this ban on homeschooling. In April 2013, a decision by a U.S. Board of Immigration Appeals court overruled this and denied the petition for asylum, on the grounds that Germany's law applies to every resident, and does not single out any specific religious group for persecution. A petition of March 2013 for granting full and permanent legal status to the family received a White House reply in August 2013 without comment on the legal case. In March 2014, the Supreme Court declined to hear the family's appeal, but the Department of Homeland Security granted the family indefinite deferred action status, allowing them to remain in the United States. In February 2015, a bill was introduced that would allow up to 500 grants of asylum per fiscal year to families fleeing home school persecution. In September 2023, during a routine check-in, the Romeikes were informed by the federal government that their status as legal residents of the United States was being revoked, and that they were required to return to Germany.

The Twelve Tribes is one religious group that insists on home schooling and has been in conflict with authorities. On September 5, 2013, German police raided two communities and removed 40 children to protect them from supposed continued abuse. An investigative TV report had documented systematic child abuse in a 100-strong community in Bavaria, including "persistent beatings for the most trivial offences". A few days later, German media reported about the disappearance of about ten school-aged children from the small town of Dolchau. Probably they had been brought to a farm belonging to the Twelve Tribes in the Czech Republic to elude intervention by the authorities who would ensure their public schooling. In 2002 there were several police raids against the Twelve Tribes, which do not want to send their children to school. The children were taken away from the sect, which was legitimated in 2018 by the European Court of Human Rights.

There is no general exemption for religious or pedagogical reasons; exemptions are allowed for severe illness, children of diplomats, and rarely for working children such as actors. The last petition in the Bundestag to release the punishment of adults who practice homeschooling was denied.

==== Greece ====
Status: Illegal

Compulsory education for children from 6 to 15 years old, consisting of 6 years of primary school and 3 years of secondary school education. Homeschooling is only allowed for children with special needs.

==== Hungary ====
Status: Heavy Regulated

Homeschooling is legal under certain conditions. There is a compulsory education for children from 3 to 16 years. Mostly, children are homeschooled due to illness or other special circumstances. Homeschooled children have to be tested at least twice a year.

==== Iceland ====
Status: Regulated

Homeschooling is legal only if the home teacher has a teaching degree.

==== Republic of Ireland ====
Status: Legal

From 2004 to 2006, 225 children had been officially registered with the Republic of Ireland's National Education Welfare Board, which estimated there may be as many as 1500–2000 more unregistered homeschooled students. The right to a home education is guaranteed by the Constitution of Ireland.

==== Italy ====
Status: Regulated

In Italy, homeschooling is legal. It is called "Istruzione Parentale" which is the legal and formal term. "Educazione parentale" and "Istruzione Famigliare" are used by two different advocacy organizations. Most commonly, parents involved in the practise informally call it "homeschooling". The legal status of the practice draws on the Constitution which states: "It is the duty and right of parents to support, raise and educate their children, even if born out of wedlock. In the case of incapacity of the parents, the law provides for the fulfilment of their duties" (art. 30). Further regulations have required the mandatory annual notification to the authorities and the annual parents' self-certification of technical and economic capacity to teach their children (legislative decree 297/1994). Moreover, children are required to pass annual exams which are non-standardized assessments (legislative decree 62/2017 and ministerial decree 8 February 2021).

==== Netherlands ====
Status: Generally illegal

In the Netherlands, homeschooling is not a recognized form of education and every child is subject to compulsory education from his/her fifth birthday, with exemptions:

- the child is physically or mentally unfit for school education (11194 children in 2024–2025),
- the parents have reservations about the religious or philosophical direction of education in all schools with appropriate education at a reasonable distance from the home (2860 children in 2024–2025),
- the child is enrolled in and regularly visits a foreign school (9403 children in 2023–2024)

Many in the first group and all in the second group are home schooled. Until 1969 homeschooling was a recognized form of education.

==== Norway ====
Status: Regulated

Homeschooling is legal. The municipality is responsible for checking that the homeschooling's curriculum is "equal to" public schooling, but the wording of the law is vague and does not prescribe how this is supposed to be done. Hence, every municipality does things differently: some municipalities assist the parents by providing funding for educational materials, while other municipalities make it a child protection issue.

==== Poland ====
Status: De jure heavily regulated, de facto poorly regulated

Homeschooling is de jure only allowed on highly regulated terms. De facto it is increasingly a popular option. Every child must be enrolled in a school (the school does not need to be a public school). The school principal may, but is not obliged to, allow of homeschooling a particular child. Usually the permission is just a formality and it is fairly easy to receive it. Homeschooled children are required to pass annual exams covering material in school curriculum, and failure on an exam automatically terminates the homeschooling permit. Even though it may seem difficult to homeschool in Poland, parents can choose a "homeschool friendly" school", where both children and parents can get support, where different trips or meetings for homeschooled students can be organized. As of February 2024, 54 936 children were homeschooled in Poland (up from 10 976 in the 2019–20 school year), according to Poland's Ministry of Education.

==== Portugal ====
Status: Legal

Homeschooling is legal. However, not many people choose the option of homeschooling, primarily due to lack of public awareness of the option to homeschool.

==== Romania ====
Status: Legal

Homeschooling is legal as of 2002, after it was included in the Romanian Educational Law at the request of the Romanian Home-Schooling Association. The compulsory education age is between 6–16 years.

==== Russia ====
Status: Regulated

There are at least two forms of education that look like homeschooling. With "family education", homeschooled students are attached to a state-licensed school where they are allowed to participate in laboratory work and extracurricular activities, may use teacher support and the school library and do tests and exams in every subject. The local authorities are obliged to pay the parents some money, but no specific requirements exist. The formal, usually annual, interim examinations (Промежуточная Аттестация), even the online ones, are mandatory at least in the 4th and 9th grades. Many children finish a 9-year curriculum in less than 3 years. There is also a hybrid form of education, when the child can attend the classes of their choice and the rest of the subjects study on their own with school frequency not being compulsory and with full access to all the activities other can and with parents receiving free school books and with scholar tests (in the end of a cycle) being paid by national government.

==== Slovenia ====
Status: Legal

Home education (called izobraževanje na domu in Slovene) is legal in Slovenia as of 1996. The law regarding home education has not been changed since then. It is almost identical to Montenegrin model of home education. According to the Slovenian Ministry of Education, it is based on Danish model of home education.

The compulsory school-age starts at 6 and lasts for 9 years (page 18 (8666), article 45). The child being home educated is required to enroll into a local school (public or private) and pass annual exam in certain subjects (mother tongue and math only in lower grades; with addition of foreign language in middle grades and more subjects in higher grades, Page 22(8670) Article 90). If the child does not pass all the exams in two attempts, it is ordered to continue the education with regular school attendance. Every year the parents have to notify the school before starting new school year that they will be home educating their child.

There are no special requirements for parents wanting to home educate their children. Parents are not eligible for any kind of state help nor are schools required to provide any kind of assistance. The schools are free to choose (they often do) whether they will allow special arrangements with home educated children (flexi-schooling, the use of school resources, participation in field trips and other school activities, etc.). The Ministry of Education and schools are not required to provide any form of help to parents of home educated children (teacher guides, worksheets, consultation, etc.).

In the school year 2010/2011, 97 children were reported to be home educated.

As of July 2011, there are no organised home education groups in Slovenia.

==== Slovakia ====
Status: Heavily regulated

Homeschooling is legal in Slovakia. However, a child's tutor is required to have a degree with a major in primary school education, and homeschooling is restricted only to the first four years of primary education. Since 2021 is legal for 9 grades.

==== Spain ====
Status: Illegal

In Spain homeschooling is in somewhat of a legal vacuum The status of homeschooling in Spain is unclear. On the one hand the Spanish Constitution, in Article 27, talks of compulsive education (not schooling), the freedom of teaching and the right of parents to choose their children's education in accordance with their own personal, moral and religious convictions. On the other hand, Spanish education law speaks of compulsive school attendance for all children between the ages of 6 and 16. (Sec. 4.2 Organic Law on Education 2/2006, of 3 May).

In 2010 a family went in front of the Spanish Constitutional Court to argue that the Spanish education laws are not in accordance with the parental rights granted by the Constitution and are therefore unlawful. The decision made by the Constitutional Court made it clear that current education laws were in fact lawful interpretations of the Constitution with the result that since 2010 effectively school attendance is considered mandatory in Spain for all children from 6 to 16 (STC 133/2010, of 2 December). However, the Constitutional Court also made it clear that the Constitution indeed only talks of compulsive education and that a change in the law to make homeschooling a legal alternative to regular school attendance would be a possible and lawful option for the future.

In 2009 the regional government of Catalonia amended its education law so that now according to article 55 "education without attendance to school" is a viable option. However, as a regional law, it is unable to contradict the education law passed by the national parliament. Hence, the newly amended Catalan law can only refer to pupils who have special needs or are for some other reason unable attend school regularly in order that they may have their educational rights met. (Sec. 3.9 Organic Law on Education 2/2006).

==== Sweden ====
Status: Virtually illegal

In Sweden, children are obligated to attend school from the age of 6. In 2010 Sweden passed a law (SFS 2010:800) that added further restrictions on homeschooling to an earlier law which was passed in 1985. Homeschooling is only allowed for certain specific reasons such as for children of parents working temporarily in the country. Homeschooling will not be approved based on religious beliefs or philosophical reasons, nor is there an automatic approval if the parent has had teacher training. Recent court cases have supported these restrictions on parents.

==== Switzerland ====
Status: Legal, restricted in some cantons and forbidden in others.

Homeschooling is legal in Switzerland. Requirements vary from canton to canton. In the Cantons Luzern, Zug, Schwyz and Zürich the teachers must have a Lehrdiplom (teaching diploma), in Cantons Bern, Aargau, Geneva, Neuchatel and Vaud this is not required. In Canton Obwalden homeschooling has to be allowed by the administration. The Bundesgericht decided in 2019 that there is no right for homeschooling based on the Swiss law. In 2011 approximately 200 – 500 families currently homeschool, in 2023 a study found 4136 children (0.3% of all pupils) where learning in homeschools.

==== Ukraine ====
Status: Heavily regulated

The Home School Legal Defense Association claims that homeschooling is legal and expressly allowed for by Articles 59 and 60 of Ukraine's Education Law, but local authorities do not always agree.

Homeschooling is mentioned briefly in The Law of Ukraine on Education, article 59:

Parents and persons who substitute them shall be obliged to assist children to get education in educational institutions or provide them with full-value home education in accordance with the requirements to its content, level and scope.

In 2019 a law came into force, which liberalized the education system. Before the law, to receive home education, children had to demonstrate that they cannot visit school due to medical condition or disability. That restriction is now lifted.

Ukrainian education system remains very restrictive though. Curriculum must be authorized by the school appointed supervisor. To receive home education, children have to register with a school and to undergo assessments by the school up to 4 times a year. In case an assessment fails, the child loses the privilege of home education.

==== United Kingdom ====
Status: Officially legal (England and Wales, Scotland and Northern Ireland have their own education laws each with variations regarding home education.)

Home education is legal in the United Kingdom. Parents are legally required to ensure that their children receive "efficient full-time education suitable to [their] age, ability and aptitude, and... to any special educational needs [they] may have, either by regular attendance at school or otherwise." Parents are not required to inform local authorities that they are home educating.

A report commissioned by the UK government in 2009 found that councils were aware of approximately 20,000 children being home educated, but that the true number could be in excess of 80,000. A study by the BBC in 2018 found that councils were aware of 48,000 children who were being home educated in 2016/7.

The Department for Education estimated 97,000 children were home educated in the summer of 2023, an increase of 11,000 on the previous year.

=== Oceania ===
==== Australia ====
Status: Legal

Homeschooling is a legal option for education in every state and territory of Australia. Around 30,000 children in Australia are homeschooled, including students who take distance education.

==== New Zealand ====
Status: Legal

As of July 2011 there were 6,517 homeschooled pupils registered with the Ministry of Education. It is an increase of 23.6% since 1998. As at 1 July 2013, there were 5,521 home schooled students recorded in the Ministry of Education's homeschooling database. These students belong to 2,789 families and represent 0.7% of total school enrolments as at 1 July 2013. Out of the 5,521 homeschooled students 65% were the aged 12 or under, 66% had been home-schooled for less than 5 years, and only 4% had been home-schooled for 10 years or more.

== See also ==
- Home School Legal Defense Association
- Schoolhouse Home Education Association
