= Homeschooling =

Education of children outside of a school

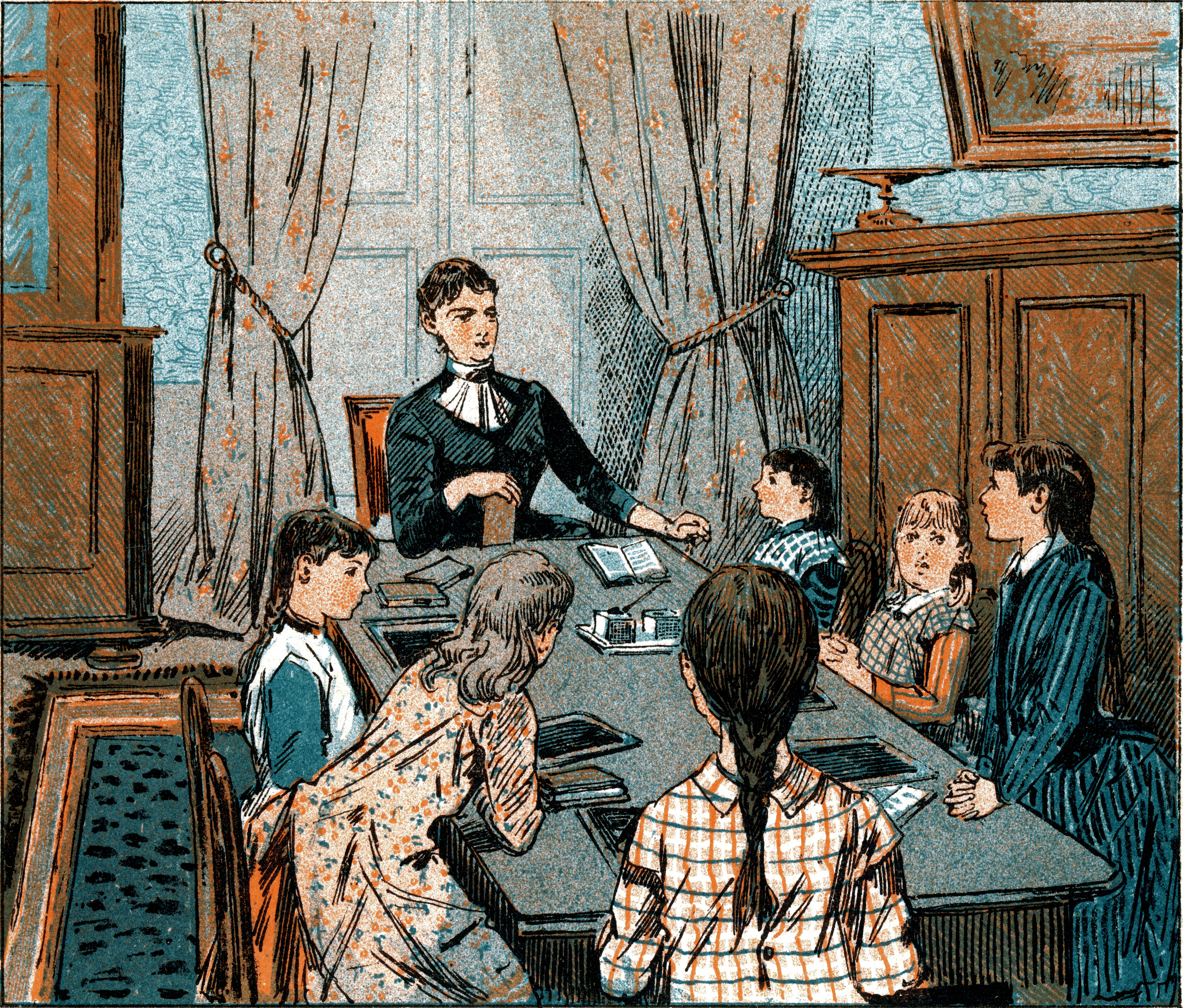
Educating children at home

Homeschooling or home schooling (British English), also known as home education or elective home education (British English), is the education of school-aged children in places other than a traditional school. Homeschooling is usually conducted by a parent, tutor, or online teacher. The practice of homeschooling varies considerably: the spectrum ranges from highly structured forms based on traditional school lessons to forms such as unschooling, which is a process in which the parent seeks to turn the child's interests into educational moments.

Homeschooling differs from distance education, which generally refers to an arrangement where the student follows the curriculum and requirements of an online school rather than being educated independently by their parents or themselves. Some aspects of homeschooling may overlap with an independent study program offered by an accredited school, which takes place at home but usually provides a pre-determined curriculum (educational plan). Similarly, it may overlap with a home and hospital education program, which is run by public schools for students who are too ill to attend school in person.

Before the introduction of compulsory school attendance laws, most childhood education was done by families and local communities. By the early 19th century, attending school became the most common means of education in the developed world. In the mid to late 20th century, more people began questioning the practice of school-based learning, which led to an increase in homeschooling, especially in the Americas and some European countries. Homeschooling has become a common and legal alternative to public and private schools in many countries, largely due to the Internet, allowing quick access to information. The legality of homeschooling and the requirements imposed on homeschooling families varies by jurisdiction. Homeschooling has evolved from a niche practice to a more widely recognized educational option; there has been a significant increase in homeschooling.

There are many reasons for homeschooling, ranging from personal interests to dissatisfaction with the school system, either in principle or due to problems they experienced, such as racism in schools. Homeschooling is also an option for families living in remote rural areas, those temporarily abroad, those who travel frequently and therefore have difficulty enrolling their children in schools, and those who want to spend more time with their children. Health reasons and special needs can also explain why children cannot attend an outside-the-home school regularly and are at least partially homeschooled.

Critics of homeschooling say that, because some homeschooled children have fewer opportunities to be exposed to their peers, they are less likely to develop healthy social skills. Critics also say that a child might not encounter people of other cultures, worldviews, and socioeconomic groups if not enrolled in a school. Some are also concerned that some parents are unqualified to teach their children, or that abusive parents may use homeschooling to isolate their children. Therefore, these critics believe homeschooling cannot guarantee a comprehensive, neutral education without prescribed educational standards.

== Terminology ==
While homeschooling is the term commonly used in the United States and other nations in North America, home education is primarily used in the United Kingdom, elsewhere in Europe and in many Commonwealth countries.

Some families who initially attended a school go through a deschooling process to detach from traditional school habits and prepare for a form of academic learning that requires more personal responsibility.

== History ==
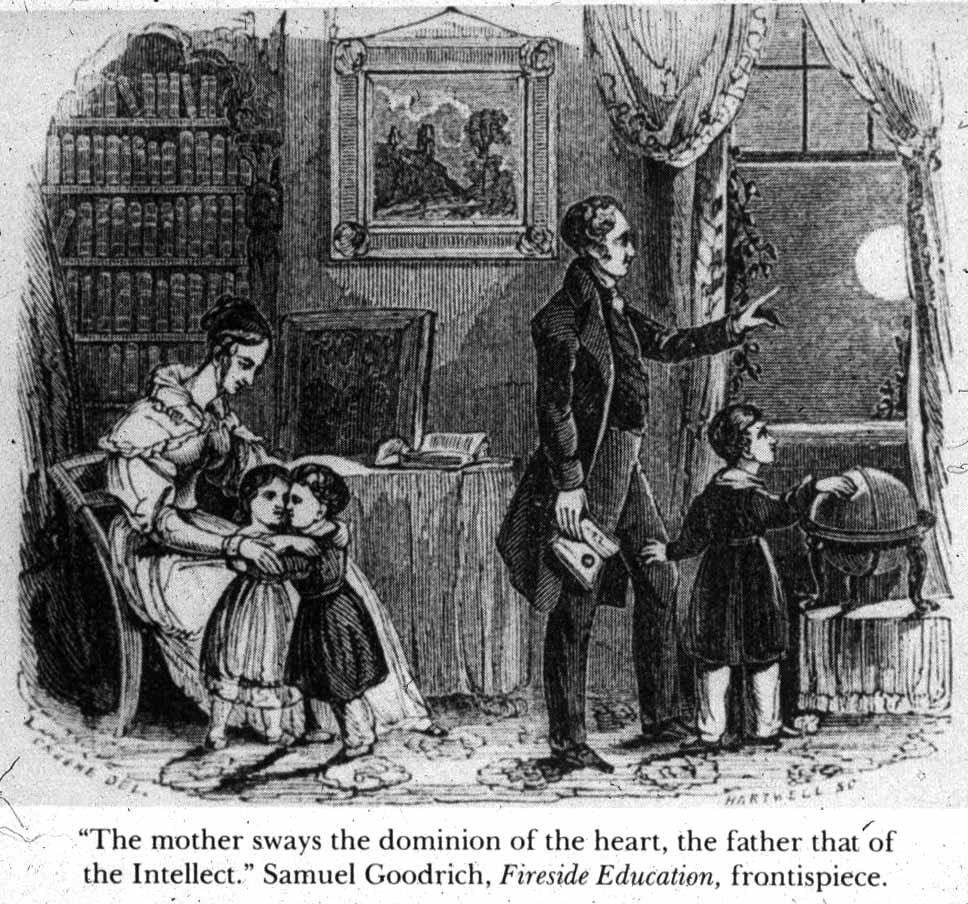
Frontispiece to Fireside Education, Samuel Griswold (Goodrich)

=== Early history ===
For most of history, home-based education was common. In many cultures, home education often consisted of literacy training centered around religious texts, as well as basic math skills needed in everyday life. In past Christian-majority cultures, reading aloud, reciting, and memorizing passages from the Christian Bible and other writings was central to this practice, as well as workplace-based education such as apprenticeships. Enlisting professional tutors was an option available only to the wealthy.

Home education and apprenticeship remained the main form of education until the 1830s. However, prior to the 18th century, the majority of Europeans lacked formal education. In the early 19th century, formal classroom schooling became the most common means of schooling throughout developed countries. As laws enforcing public school attendance proliferated, movements resisting such laws began to form.

Home education declined in the 19th and 20th centuries with the enactment of compulsory school attendance laws. However, it continued to be practised in isolated communities. What can be considered contemporary homeschooling began in the 1960s and 1970s, led by educational reformists who were dissatisfied with industrialized education.

=== United States ===
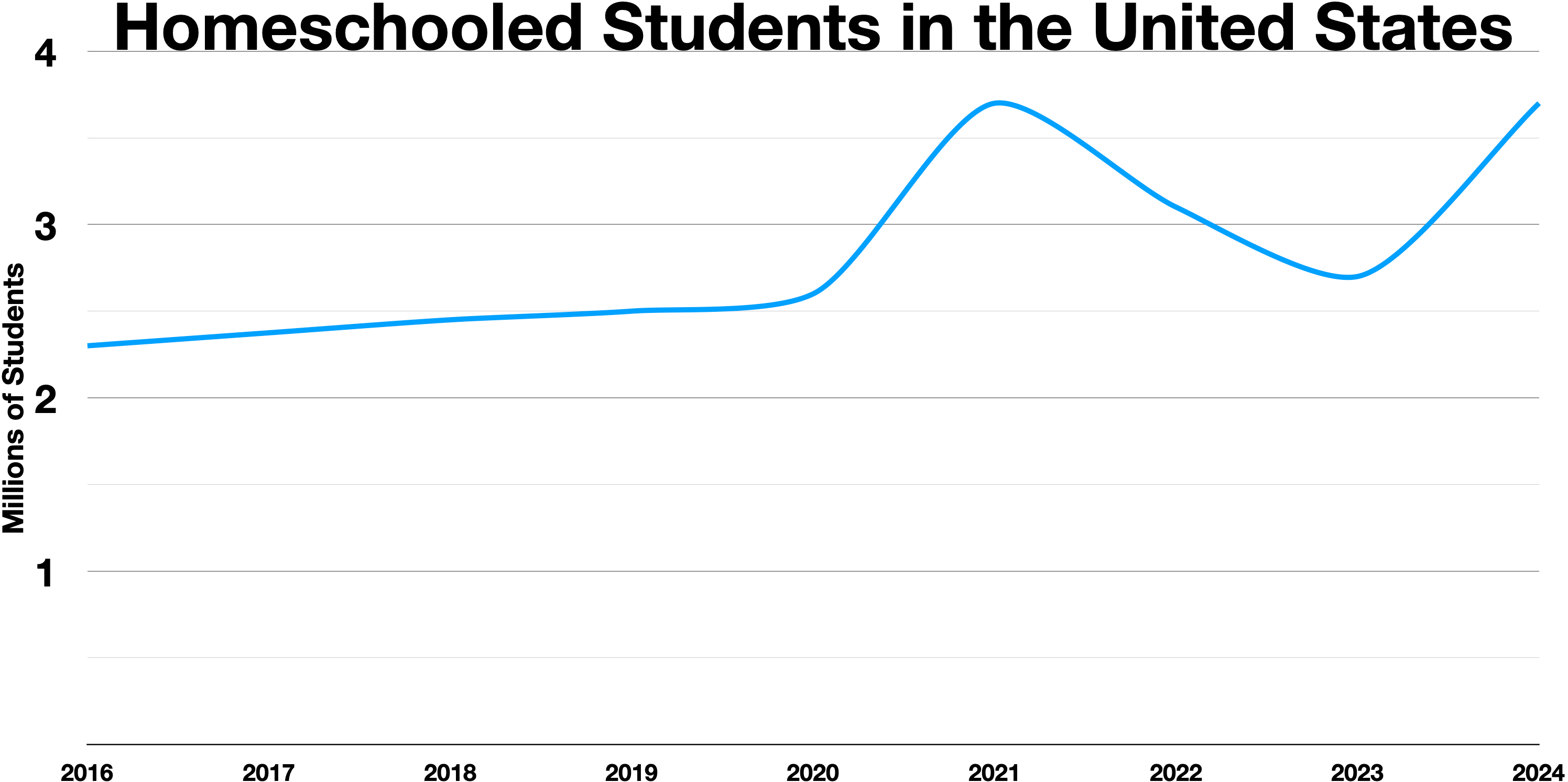
Homeschooled students in the United States

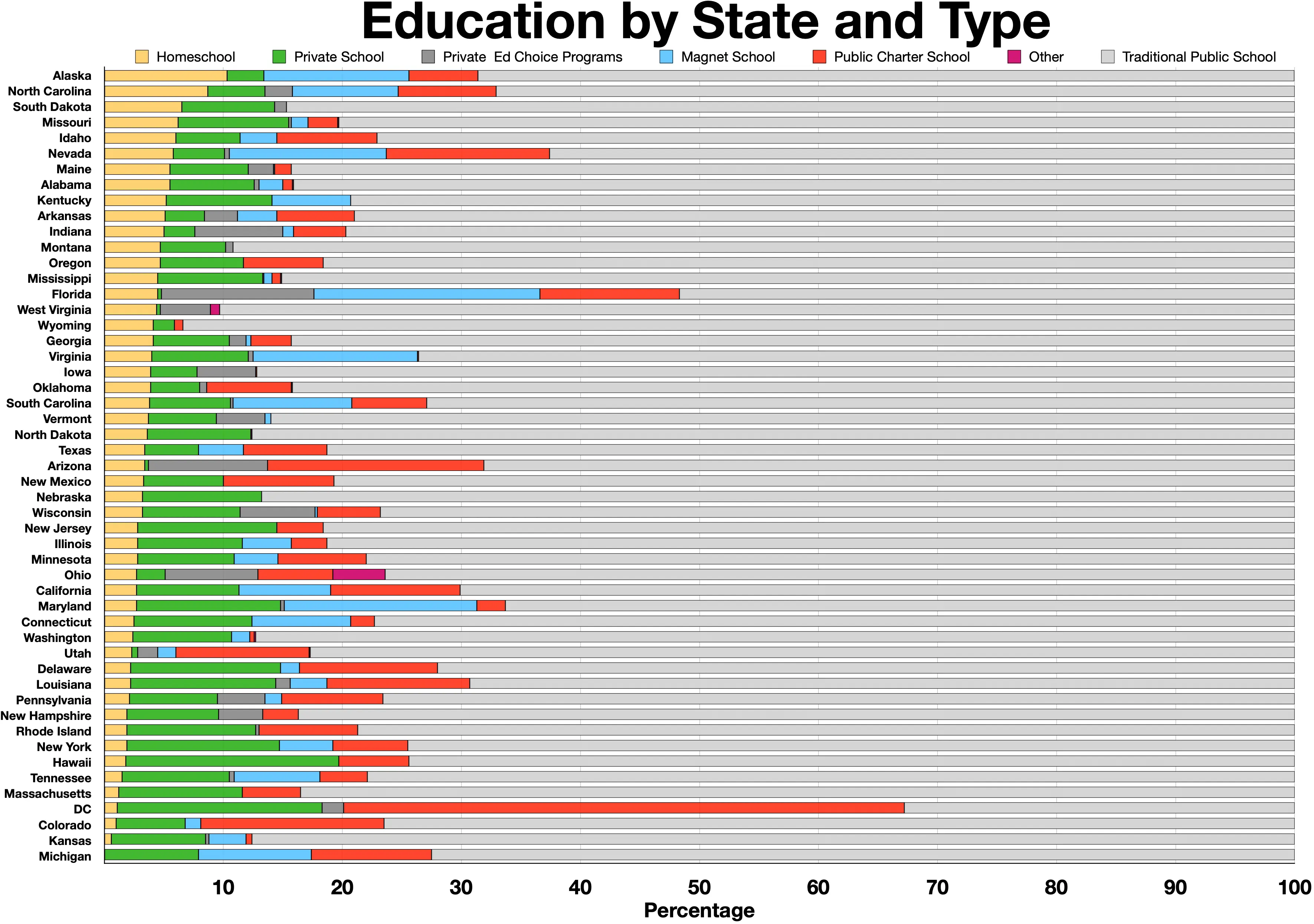
Homeschool education by state

In America, resistance to laws mandating school attendance emerged as early as the end of the nineteenth century. Catholic groups in particular resisted the enforcement of Protestant ideals in public schools, as was observed in the 1844 Philadelphia nativist riots. Resistance to mandatory schooling was sporadic throughout the 19th century as the state undertook more responsibility in protecting the rights of children.

The mid-century interest in homeschooling was supported by a number of factors including the isolation of suburban geographies, the civil rights movement and resulting school desegregation, and reported government skepticism through the 1960s and 1970s. A 1979 Wall Street Journal article cited "religious, political, and social convictions, or simply disgust at conditions in public or private schools" as reasons parents gave for homeschooling their children.

The Home School Legal Defense Association (HSLDA), founded in 1983, influenced the legal status of homeschooling in the United States. In the 1980s, homeschooling was illegal throughout much of the United States for parents who were not themselves trained educators. In the 21st century, in most of the United States, there is little to no oversight of homeschoolers and no specific educational requirements for parents. Homeschooling is legal in all 50 states in the United States. Homeschoolers must follow regulations set by their states.

The number of children being homeschooled has increased, with some estimates suggesting the number went from under twenty thousand families in the 1970s – a 1979 Wall Street Journal quoted an estimate that approximately 10,000 families were teaching their children at home – to nearly 500,000 by the end of the 1980s. Before the COVID-19 pandemic, approximately 3% of US students were homeschooling. In 2023–2024 school year, approximately 6% of US students were being homeschooled, compared to about 10% in private schools and 84% in public schools.

=== Germany ===
Homeschooling is heavily restricted in Germany. The history of public schooling dates back to the time of Martin Luther, who called on the government to provide schooling to both boys and girls in To the Councilmen of all Cities in Germany (An die Ratsherren aller Städte deutschen Landes), so that they might read the Bible for themselves. Germany has one of the strictest compulsory education laws in Europe, rooted in the 1919 Reichsschulgesetz, which mandates physical attendance at a recognized school. This principle, known as Schulpflicht (school obligation), differs from Unterrichtspflicht (education obligation) found in other countries, where homeschooling is often permitted as long as children receive an education. Attempts to homeschool without approval can result in fines, legal action, or even custody disputes, as local school authorities (Schulamt) strictly enforce attendance laws

=== France ===
Homeschooling in France is permitted only in specific circumstances: for the child's health, for intensive artistic or sports training, for itinerant families, and for those who live too far from a school. To be granted the right to homeschool, parents must have a baccalauréat or equivalent to prove they are qualified to teach. These restrictions were introduced in September 2022, known as loi contre le séparatisme: a law designed to reduce "Islamist separatism" and enforce secularism.

=== Canada ===
Home education in Ontario is subject to section 21(2)(a) of the Education Act, which exempts children: "A person is exempt from attending school in one of the following cases: (a) they receive satisfactory instruction at home or elsewhere".

=== Asia ===
A meta-analysis of studies on homeschooling in Asia found that most homeschoolers cited religion as their reason for homeschooling. In East Asia, homeschooling is gaining traction among urban families in cities like Taipei and Hong Kong, driven by dissatisfaction with rigid school systems and a desire for more holistic, child-centered learning

In most Middle Eastern states, school attendance is compulsory for citizens, but optional for expats. After the COVID-19 pandemic, a number of countries such as Jordan, Iraq, and Egypt released online resources for home education, although resources for home education in the Arabic language remain limited.

=== Africa ===
The legal status of homeschooling in Africa varies. In Kenya, public education is compulsory and homeschooling is not specifically addressed by the law. Families may face repercussions for pursuing home education. Homeschooling in South Africa is regulated under the BELA act which requires homeschooling parents to register with the government and submit to academic assessments, in addition to allowing governments to inspect and approve homeschooling setups. In Namibia, the government may mandate homeschool curriculum. In many other African countries, homeschooling is not explicitly addressed by law.

=== COVID-19 pandemic ===
Because schools were widely shut down during the early part of the COVID-19 pandemic, many schools implemented distance education and online learning. This is not considered homeschooling since public schools direct students' education. However, the onset of the pandemic triggered a massive increase in the prevalence of homeschooling. An investigation by the Washington Post estimated that the United States saw a rise of homeschooled children from 1.5 million to between 1.9 and 2.7 million, a number comparable to the number of students in charter schools or Catholic schools. This increase was far-reaching across every measured demographic category and region. This increase has led to a rise in critical interest in the impacts of homeschooling, both positive and negative.

== Motivations ==
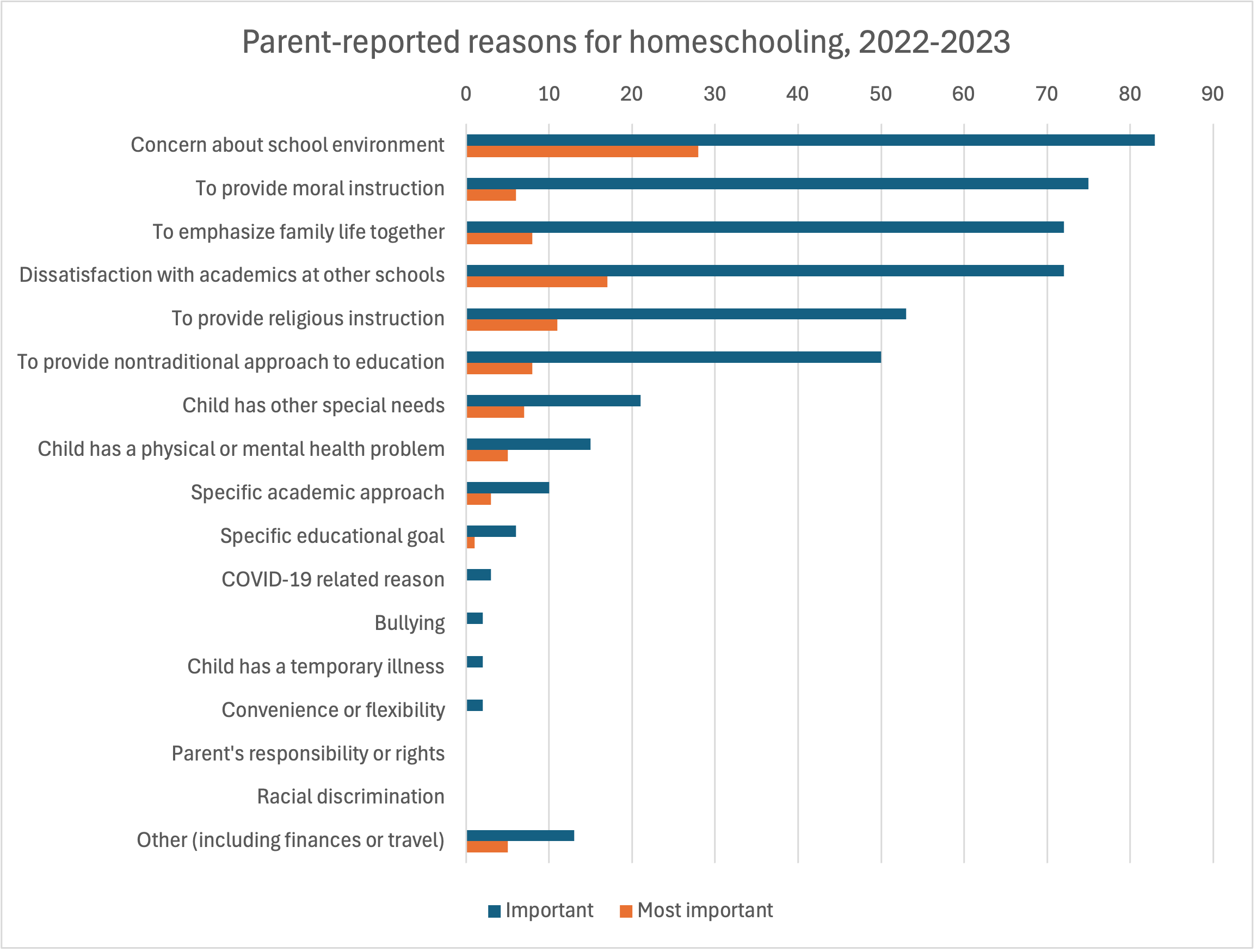
Families have a wide variety of reasons for choosing homeschooling. This bar chart shows the most common motivations for homeschooling in the United States as of 2023.

There are many reasons why parents and children choose to homeschool, whether by necessity or by choice.

Homeschool may be a necessity for a variety of reasons. For those who are in isolated rural locations that are too far from a conventional school, living abroad, or travel frequently, homeschool provides more consistency and convenience, eliminating the issues of distance or cultural barriers. Many young athletes, actors, and musicians are taught at home to accommodate their travel and practice schedules more conveniently. Mental and physical health issues are also a reason parents may homeschool or take distance education.

Parents commonly cite two main motivations for voluntarily homeschooling their children: dissatisfaction with the local schools and the interest in increased involvement with their children's learning and development. Parental dissatisfaction with available schools typically includes concerns about the school environment, the quality of academic instruction, the curriculum, bullying, the risk of school shootings, racism, and lack of faith in the school's ability to cater to their children's special needs. Some parents homeschool to have greater control over what and how their children are taught, to cater more adequately to an individual child's aptitudes and abilities, to provide instruction from a specific religious or and moral position, and to take advantage of the efficiency of one-to-one instruction and thus allow the child to spend more time on childhood activities, socializing, and non-academic learning.

A 2023 survey of homeschooling parents in the United States found concerns about school environment, moral instruction, dissatisfaction with academics, concern about school shootings, and bullying to be the most common reasons for homeschooling. The need for distance learning during the COVID-19 pandemic caused many parents to consider homeschooling where they might not have before.

Concerns about school environment – the most commonly cited reason for homeschooling – may comprise a number of issues with conventional schooling, such as protection against bullying, social exclusion, drugs, stress, sexualization, social pressures, excessive performance thoughts, social groups or role models with negative influences, and degrading treatment in school. Children may also learn more efficiently at home because they are not distracted by other students or typical school scheduling. Some parents are of the opinion that certain temperaments are promoted in school, while others are inhibited which may also be a reason to homeschool their children. Many parents also homeschool their children and return their child into the school system later on, for example because they think that their child is too young or not yet ready to start school. The homeschool setting is also crucial when children begin to develop theory of mind; everything in their homeschooling environment can affect the way their theory of mind develops.

=== Religion ===
Some parents have objections to the secular nature of public schools and homeschool to give their children a religious education. Use of a religious curriculum such as Abeka is common among these families. In the United States, conservative Christians drove the movement to homeschool and made up the vast majority of homeschoolers until recent years. However, the percent of people who cited religion as the primary reason for homeschooling has declined drastically. In 2012, almost 2 of 3 homeschool parents did, while by 2023, the proportion dropped to just over 1 in 3. In a survey of adults homeschooled in Christian households, over half of respondents characterized their family as fundamentalist, and over 80% reported being taught Young Earth creationism as part of their science education. Homeschooling parents tend, in general, to lean more conservative than the general population. According to Texas Home School Coalition 21% of families in Texas chose to home school to insert religious or moral education.

In Asia, the majority of homeschoolers cited religion – Christianity, Confucianism, or Islam – as their primary reason for homeschooling.

=== Racism ===
Some African-American families choose to homeschool as a way of increasing their children's understanding of African-American history – such as the Jim Crow laws that resulted in African Americans being prevented from reading and writing – and to limit the harm caused by the unintentional and sometimes subtle systemic racism that affects most American schools. The increase of homeschooling post-COVID-19 pandemic saw the greatest increases among Black, Latino, and Asian American households. Many families cited concerns that their children, particularly boys, were perceived as threatening or violent at school due to racism, as well as the issue of school quality and funding.

== Teaching methods, forms and philosophies ==
Homeschooling is usually conducted by a parent, tutor, or an online teacher, but the concrete practice can vary widely. The spectrum ranges from highly structured forms based on traditional school lessons to more open, free forms like unschooling, which is a curriculum-free implementation of homeschooling that involves teaching children based on their interests.

Homeschool families can use a wide variety of educational methods and materials with a wide range of educational paradigms. Some of the concepts homeschoolers can incorporate include classical education (including Trivium, Quadrivium), Charlotte Mason education, Montessori, theory of multiple intelligences, unschooling, Waldorf, school-at-home (curriculum choices from both secular and religious publishers), and A Thomas Jefferson Education. Homeschool educations may incorporate pre-made curriculum made up from private or small publishers, apprenticeship, hands-on-learning, distance learning (both online and correspondence), dual enrollment in local schools or colleges, and curriculum provided by local schools and many others.

A student's education may be customized to support their learning level, style, and interests. It is not uncommon for a student to experience more than one approach as the family discovers what works best for their student. Some companies offer all-in-one homeschooling curricula. Purchased as a grade-level package or separately by subject, the package may contain all of the needed books, materials, tests, answer keys, and extensive teacher guides. However, many families use an eclectic approach, picking and choosing from various suppliers. For sources of curricula and books, a study found that 78 percent used "a public library"; 77 percent used "a homeschooling catalogue, publisher, or individual specialist"; 68 percent used "retail bookstore or another store"; 60 percent used "an education publisher that was not affiliated with homeschooling." "Approximately half" used curriculum from "a homeschooling organization", 37 percent from a "church, synagogue or other religious institution" and 23 percent from "their local public school or district." In 2003, 41 percent used some sort of distance learning, approximately 20 percent by "television, video or radio"; 19 percent via "The Internet, e-mail, or the World Wide Web"; and 15 percent taking a "correspondence course by mail designed specifically for homeschoolers."

Individual governmental units, e.g. states and local districts, vary in official curriculum and attendance requirements.

=== Structured versus unstructured ===
Approaches to homeschooling fall under two categories: structured and unstructured. Structured homeschooling includes any method or style of home education that follows a basic curriculum with articulated goals and outcomes. This style attempts to imitate the structure of a traditional school setting while personalizing the curriculum. Unstructured homeschooling, also known as unschooling, is any form of home education where parents do not construct a curriculum at all. This method attempts to teach through the child's daily experiences and focuses more on self-directed learning by the child, free of textbooks, teachers, and any formal assessment of success or failure.

=== Unschooling and natural learning ===
The term unschooling, coined by John Holt, describes an approach in which parents do not authoritatively direct the child's education, but interact with the child following the child's interests, leaving them free to explore and learn. Natural learning refers to a type of learning-on-demand where children pursue knowledge based on their interests and parents take an active part in facilitating activities and experiences conducive to learning but do not rely heavily on textbooks or spend much time "teaching", looking instead for "learning moments" throughout their daily activities. Parents see their role as that of affirming through positive feedback and modeling the necessary skills, and the child's role as being responsible for asking and learning.

Another prominent proponent of unschooling is John Taylor Gatto, author of Dumbing Us Down, The Exhausted School, A Different Kind of Teacher, and Weapons of Mass Instruction. Gatto argues that public education is the primary tool of "state-controlled consciousness" and serves as a prime illustration of the total institution — a social system which impels obedience to the state and quells free-thinking or dissent.

==== Informal learning ====
Informal learning refers to the component of homeschooling which happens outside of the classroom. Informal learning is an everyday form of learning through participation and creation, in contrast with the traditional view of teacher-centered learning. The term is usually used synonymously with "non-formal learning" and "self-directed learning." Informal learning differs from traditional learning as there are no expected objectives or outcomes. From the learner's standpoint, the knowledge that they receive is not intentional. Activities such as planting a garden, baking a cake or even talking to a technician at work about the installation of new software can be considered informal learning: the individual is completing a task with different intentions but ends up learning skills in the process. Children watching their tomato plants grow will not generate questions about photosynthesis but they will learn that their plants are growing with water and sunlight. This leads them to have a base understanding of complex scientific concepts without any background studying.

Depending on the part of the world, informal learning can take on many different identities and has differing cultural importances. Many ways of organizing homeschooling draw on the model of apprenticeships and play-based learning. In some South American indigenous cultures, such as the Chillihuani community in Peru, children learn irrigation and farming technique through play, advancing them not only in their own village and society but also in their knowledge of realistic techniques that they will need to survive. In Western culture, children use informal learning in two main ways: through hands-on experience with new material, and by asking questions to someone who has more experience (i.e. parents, elders). The concept of informal learning depends on the inquisitiveness and interests of the child.

==== Unit studies ====
In a unit study approach, multiple subjects such as math, science, history, art, and geography, are studied in relation to a single topic. Unit studies are useful for teaching multiple grades simultaneously as the difficulty level can be adjusted for each student. An extended form of unit studies, Integrated Thematic Instruction uses one central theme integrated throughout the curriculum so that students finish a school year with a deep understanding of a certain broad subject or idea.

==== Autonomous learning ====
Autonomous learning is a school of education which sees learners as individuals who can and should be autonomous; i.e., be responsible for their own learning climate.

Autonomous education helps students develop their self-consciousness, vision, practicality, and freedom of discussion. These attributes serve to aid the student in their independent learning. However, a student must not start their autonomous learning completely on their own. It is said that first having interaction with someone who has more knowledge in a subject will speed up the student's learning and allow them to learn more independently.

Some degree of autonomous learning is popular with those who home educate their children. In true autonomous learning, the child usually gets to decide what projects they wish to tackle or what interests to pursue. In-home education, this can be instead of or in addition to regular subjects like doing math or English.

=== Hybrid homeschooling ===
Hybrid homeschooling or flex-school is a form of homeschooling in which children split their time between homeschool and a more traditional schooling environment like a school. The number of students who participated in hybrid homeschooling increased during the COVID-19 pandemic. In 2017, a study found that over 55% of homeschoolers are flexischooled, taking university or high school classes at least part of the time.

A commonly cited reason for choosing this model is that parents are not sure whether they can provide their children a comprehensive and neutral education at home or cannot devote themselves to homeschooling full-time due to time constraints or excessive stress. Some families also want their children to socialize with other children and find that schools are better suited for this purpose because social exchange does not only take place occasionally, but is an everyday experience there.

== Homeschool cooperatives ==
A homeschool cooperative is a cooperative of families who homeschool their children. It provides an opportunity for children to learn from other parents who are more specialized in certain areas or subjects. Co-ops also provide social interaction. They may take lessons together or go on field trips. Some co-ops also offer events such as prom and graduation for homeschoolers.

== Research on outcomes ==
Research on homeschooling faces a number of challenges and limitations. Studies on homeschooled students typically rely on convenience sampling, which may disproportionately sample the highest-achieving homeschoolers. Researchers have identified a need for more representative samples in studying homeschooling.

The documentation and regulation of homeschooling in the United States is highly variable among states, with a minority of states administering any rigorous testing or record-keeping of homeschooled children; in eleven states, no record of homeschooled students is kept at all. As of 2022, virtually all research on homeschooling used convenience sampling, leading to issues with selection bias.

Homeschoolers as a demographic tend towards distrust of surveillance and institutions, making eliminating survey bias a challenge. Other common methodological problems commonly included the presence of confounding factors such as socioeconomic status and parental involvement, over-reliance on parental testimony, and taking into account the timing and duration of homeschooling (many homeschoolers only do so for a few years). Homeschooling research is often conducted on homeschooled children or their parents; surveys of adults who have been homeschooled are extremely limited.

The majority of homeschool research in the United States is done with the support of the homeschool advocacy group, the Home School Legal Defense Association (HSLDA). A review of studies performed by prominent HSLDA-affiliated researcher Dr. Brian D. Ray found severe design limitations and demographic bias; nearly all subjects in his studies were White, Christian, and from households with two married parents who were more educated than average. Meanwhile, a 2016 federal survey of US homeschoolers found that over 40 percent of homeschoolers were not White, a majority had parents with less than a bachelor's degree, and over one in five lived in poverty. A number of large scale studies sponsored by the HSLDA on the academic achievement of homeschoolers recruited volunteers, promising the study would be used for homeschooling advocacy; subjects were able to self-report scores based on tests administered at home with parents proctoring.

In the UK, the government has noted that no figures are available on educational attainment for children educated at home: "This means no assessment can be made of the impact on educational attainment of being home schooled". In the 20th century, education was increasingly recognized as a fundamental human right, with organizations like UNESCO promoting universal access to schooling worldwide.

=== Academic ===
Claims by homeschooling proponents that homeschoolers fare better than traditionally schooled children are insufficiently supported by data. With the studies available, a 2022 review found it was unable to offer firm conclusions because of these issues, but did not find systematic evidence of poor educational or social outcomes. Another survey of studies related to homeschooling found that, controlling for demographic bias, homeschoolers were generally on par with non-homeschoolers, with a slight advantage in reading and writing, and a slight disadvantage in math. Additionally, a national study conducted on homeschooled kids' test scores for a variety of ages showed that the homeschooled kids tested equal to publicly schooled kids, and even sometimes scored higher.

==== Parental class ====
A study conducted by Ray in 2010 indicates that the higher the level of parents' income, the more likely the homeschooled child is able to achieve academic success, which is in alignment with the correlation between income and achievement for students at conventional schools. In one study of families with parents who had an average of 13 years of schooling, homeschooling was correlated with lower test scores, which was attributed to the relatively lower educational status of the parents in the sample group; meanwhile, in studies with highly educated parents, homeschooling for longer periods of time, on average, had no effect, positive or negative. A study which collected all homeschooling outcomes in Alaska (a state where homeschooling is extremely popular due to government financial incentives and support) found that low income students, students of color, and students with disabilities gained the most advantages when being homeschooled, while those from white, well-off families scored overall worse than their public school peers, and suffered the greatest disadvantage in math. This is notable as being the only study of homeschooling outcomes with a complete data set of all known homeschool children in a given population, which does not rely on volunteered information. However, the existence of a financial incentive to homeschool in Alaska does raise questions about the applicability of the results to other areas which do not have these programs in place.

==== Unschooling ====
Unschooled children tend to score significantly below traditionally educated children, and higher parental involvement and the use of a structured curriculum is strongly positively correlated with homeschooling outcomes, as with conventionally schooled students. However, some researchers have challenged the applicability of metrics like academic success on unschoolers.

==== "Math gap" ====
A survey of educational outcomes for homeschool students found that homeschoolers consistently scored below the average in math, but with mixed or average results in reading and writing. The exact cause of this is not known, but researchers speculated that this was due to the nature of curricula, which often consisted of being read to or self-directed reading, and a lack of parental training in math. Homeschooled children have been found to be less self-motivated when studying math than reading or writing. This gap in competency has also been suggested as a reason why homeschoolers are less likely to pursue higher education. A study of homeschooled college students found that although GPAs were higher overall among the homeschooled group, math GPAs were below average.

==== Higher education ====
Although educational outcomes of homeschoolers are difficult to track, especially where homeschooled students are not required to be registered, home-schoolers take standardized college admission tests such as the SAT at a disproportionately low rate, suggesting they are underrepresented in higher education. A 1990 study by the National Home Education Research Institute found that at least 33% of homeschooled students attended a four-year college, and 17% attended a two-year college (with the national average being 40% and 20%, respectively). This same study examined the students after one year, finding that 17% pursued higher education. However, a study by the Kentucky Office of Education Accountability found that homeschooled students attended college or university within Kentucky at less than half the rate of other Kentucky high school graduates, with the academic outcomes of other homeschooled students being unknown. Canadian Christian thinktank Cardus found in a demographically representative study that homeschooled students in the US and Canada were less likely to attend selective colleges, raising questions about social and institutional barriers homeschoolers faced when applying to colleges, such as lack of a conventional high school diploma.

Some homeschoolers averaged higher scores on college entrance tests in South Carolina. Other scores (1999 data) showed mixed results, for example showing higher levels for homeschoolers in English (homeschooled 23.4 vs national average 20.5) and reading (homeschooled 24.4 vs national average 21.4) on the ACT, but mixed scores in math (homeschooled 20.4 vs national average 20.7 on the ACT as opposed to homeschooled 535 vs national average 511 on the 1999 SAT math).

For those homeschoolers who do pursue higher education, their GPA tends to be higher. Cogan (2010) found that homeschooled students at a doctoral program had higher high school GPAs (3.74) and transfer GPAs (3.65) than conventional students. Snyder (2013) provided corroborating evidence that homeschoolers at a Catholic university were outperforming their peers in the areas of standardized tests and overall GPAs. Homeschoolers in college are less likely than their peers to pursue degrees in STEM topics, and more likely to pursue creative degrees, which may be attributed to the "math gap" discussed above. Limited research suggests that homeschoolers may struggle to adapt to a college environment once enrolled.

There is some evidence from 2009 that home-educated children in the UK are more likely to be NEET, Not in Employment, Education or Training, at age 16 to 18.

=== Social ===
Due to its qualitative nature and reliance on parental or self-assessment, the social outcomes of homeschooling are challenging to determine, despite being a major criticism of homeschooling as a phenomenon, and the quality of existing studies on this topic is poor, due to subject-typical problems with demographic bias.

Homeschooled children have been found to score higher than average in self-concept, a metric correlated to positive social outcomes. NHERI researcher Richard G. Medlin found that homeschooled children sampled from Christian homeschool co-ops self-reported higher in cooperation, assertiveness, empathy, and self-control than a random sample of children attending public schools. A study of the social connections of homeschooled children found that homeschoolers had an equal number of social connections as their peers, but that those connections had a larger range of ages. A review of studies on the topic found that while homeschoolers were slightly more likely to report feelings of social isolation and be less peer-oriented, this may have fostered a greater sense of independence and self-determination as well.

Homeschooled youth are less likely to use illicit substances and are more likely to disapprove of using alcohol and marijuana.

Although a large proportion of parents cited religion as their primary reason for homeschooling, a 2008 survey found that homeschooling had no effect on the religious behavior or affiliation of children, with parents holding the same degree of influence over their children regardless of their schooling method.

Homeschooled students are more likely to vote than average, and homeschooled families were found to be more politically involved than those who did not homeschool. However, homeschoolers were found to have less interest in other forms of civic engagement such as volunteering and donating to charity. Homeschoolers have been found to have low levels of social trust in institutions such as public schools, scientists, mass media, and the federal government.

=== Child abuse and neglect ===
Due to a lack of empirical evidence and reporting data, the prevalence of child abuse among homeschooled children is difficult to determine.

Homeschool advocacy groups indicate that homeschooled children suffer roughly the same rate of child abuse and neglect as those in public or private schools. However, high-profile child abuse cases have led to greater awareness of the lack of regulation and oversight of homeschooled children. A 2018 Connecticut study found that 38% of children withdrawn from school to be homeschooled lived in families with one or more reports of abuse or neglect to the Department of Children and Families. A 2025 data review found that over one in ten homeschooling families in Connecticut had at least one substantiated claim of physical abuse, physical neglect, or educational neglect. A 2014 study of child torture victims found that 47% had been withdrawn for homeschooling, and an additional 29% had never been enrolled in school. A 2022 study found that the passing of laws permitting homeschool in US states did not have a statistically significant effect on rates of child abuse or deaths, although some specifications indicated an increase in the rate of child homicide; however, this research suffers from limitations typical of the subject due to lack of documentation of homeschool families. In 2024, the Coalition for Responsible Home Education (CRHE), a homeschool reform advocacy group, released a report on its efforts to document abuse and neglect done under the auspice of homeschooling, which found nearly 500 cases of child abuse and over 200 fatalities of homeschooled children in the United States since 2000. Data was limited to publicly accessible reporting, again due to lack of documentation.

In 1990, homeschool lobbyists defeated a proposed Florida law which would have required parents to be run against a child abuse registry before being allowed to homeschool their children. Similar laws have been introduced and failed to pass state legislature in West Virginia, Illinois, Kentucky, Maryland, Louisiana, and Pennsylvania; in Utah, a law requiring background checks for homeschooling parents was removed in 2025. In the United States, only two states, Pennsylvania and Arkansas, obstruct convicted child abusers and sex offenders from homeschooling; Tennessee blocks parents from pulling children for homeschooling to obstruct pending abuse investigations. Homeschool advocates such as the HSLDA have advocated against such laws, warning of overreactions to cherry-picked outlier cases that restrict parental rights and lack effectiveness. Advocates argue that lawmakers should hold state child protective services accountable for preventing child abuse, rather than restricting the rights of homeschool parents. Homeschool reformers have raised concerns about the use of homeschooling as a legal loophole to prevent contact with mandated reporters such as teachers and physicians, particularly in states where no notice of intent to homeschool is required.

Medical neglect is also a concern for homeschooled children. A 2012 survey found that homeschooled children were far less likely than public school children to have yearly medical checkups or receive the HPV vaccine.

=== Adulthood ===
Few scholarly studies have examined the experiences of adults who were homeschooled. A survey distributed by Evangelical Christian homeschooling networks found extremely positive outcomes for homeschooled adults, while a survey distributed by the advocacy group Homeschoolers Anonymous found mixed results, with respondents reporting satisfactory academic outcomes in general, but with worse outcomes reported by respondents who reported their parents as Christian fundamentalists. A random survey of religious young adults found that those who were homeschooled got married younger, had fewer children, and divorced more frequently than those who attended Protestant private schools. The homeschool cohort also reported lower SAT scores and lower college achievement compared with those who attended private schools.

== Legality and prevalence ==
Legality of homeschooling: Legal without known restrictions Legal, subject to registration or lax restrictions Legal with restrictions Partially legal or de jure legal^{1} Illegal with (virtually) no exceptions^{2} Legal status unknown/unclear 1: Legality varies by grade, age, location, or personal circumstances. 2: Exceptions may include medical reasons although even then it is rarely permitted.

== Attitudes towards homeschooling ==
Some organizations of teachers and school districts resist homeschooling. The National Education Association, a United States teachers' union and professional association, has asserted that teachers should be licensed and that state-approved curricula should be used. Elizabeth Bartholet, a Harvard University professor of law and faculty director of the Law School's Child Advocacy Program, recommended a ban on home education in 2019, calling it a risky practice. Bartholet stated that homeschooling reduces a child's exposure to mandated reporters such as teachers, making children more susceptible to sustained, unreported abuse, and recommended that homeschooling be presumptively banned. While there is not enough data to determine exact rates of abuse in homeschooling, there is strong evidence to suggest that parents who engage in maltreatment and educational neglect are more likely to use homeschooling as a guise.

In the aftermath of COVID-19 lockdowns, there has been a significant increase in homeschooling numbers across all demographics. Homeschooling families are less likely to cite religion as their reason for homeschooling and more likely to have concerns about the schooling environment. This has led to an increase in interest about the outcomes of homeschooling from an academic and legal perspective, as well as concerns about the lack of quality research into homeschooling outcomes.

Gallup polls of American voters showed a significant change in attitude from 1985 to 2001, with respondents going from 73% opposed to homeschooling to 54% opposed. In 1988, when asked whether parents should have a right to choose homeschooling, 53 percent thought that they should, as revealed by another poll.

Political scientist Rob Reich speculated in The Civic Perils of Homeschooling (2002) that homeschooling could threaten to "insulate students from exposure to diverse ideas and people."

== Software ==
Software	Description	Platform	License
DreamBox Learning	Adaptive online learning platform focusing on math and reading for K–8 students	Web, iOS, Android	Commercial
Edgenuity	Online curriculum provider offering full courses for K–12 students, often used for credit recovery or homeschooling	Web	Commercial
GCompris	Open-source educational software suite with activities for children aged 2–10, covering math, reading, science, and geography	Windows, macOS, Linux, Android	Open-source
Time4Learning	Subscription-based online homeschool curriculum covering multiple subjects and grade levels	Web	Commercial
FlexBook	Digital textbook platform from CK-12 Foundation allowing customizable learning resources for various subjects	Web	Free
Khan Academy	Free online learning platform covering math, science, humanities, and test preparation, widely used in homeschool settings	Web, iOS, Android	Free
ABCmouse	Subscription-based educational platform for early learners (ages 2–8) with interactive lessons and activities	Web, iOS, Android	Commercial
Prodigy Math Game	Math-focused online game for grades 1–8 using role-playing game mechanics to teach curriculum-aligned math skills	Web, iOS, Android	Commercial
CK-12	Open educational resources and adaptive learning platform with interactive textbooks, simulations, and exercises	Web	Free
Connections Academy	Online school products and services to virtual schools for grades K-12, including full-time online school.	Web	Commercial
Mathletics	Math quizzes and challenges, and can participate in a real-time networked competition known as 'Live Mathletics'.	Web	Commercial
Penn Foster High School	Nationally accredited online high school diploma program and various career-focused concentration programs	Web	Commercial
Schoology	Learning management system (LMS) used by schools and online programs to deliver courses, assessments, and digital content	Web, iOS, Android	Commercial
Google Classroom	Web-based educational platform integrating Google Workspace tools to manage assignments, communication, and coursework	Web, Android, iOS	Free
Moodle	Open-source learning management system used globally for online courses, virtual schools, and blended learning	Web	Open-source

== See also ==
- Homeschooling international status and statistics
- Alternative education
- History of education
- Home education in the United Kingdom
- Home School Legal Defense Association
- Homeschooling and alternative education in India
- Homeschooling and distance education in Australia
- Homeschooling during the COVID-19 pandemic
- Homeschooling in Canada
- Homeschooling in New Zealand
- Homeschooling in South Africa
- Homeschooling in the United States
- Informal learning
- List of homeschooling programmes
