= List of homeschooling programmes =

This is a partial list of notable homeschooling curricula and programmes that are popularly used in the homeschooling community.

== Accredited institutions ==
=== Independent ===
- American School of Correspondence
- Calvert School
- Connections Academy
- Stride, Inc.
- Time4Learning
- Laurel Springs School
- Wolsey Hall, Oxford
- Acellus Academy

=== Religious ===
==== Christian ====
- Griggs International Academy, formerly Home Study International

== Separate institutions ==
=== Religious ===
==== Christian ====
- Advanced Training Institute (ATI) International

== Curricula and methodologies ==
=== Religious ===
==== Christian ====
- A Beka Book
- Accelerated Christian Education (ACE)
- Bob Jones University (BJU) Press Academy of Home Education
- Master Books
- Apologia
- Homestead Readers

== See also ==
- Homeschooling software
