= Giant Campus =

Giant Campus, Inc. is a defunct Seattle-based online education company. It was acquired by Edgenuity in 2011.

Giant Campus specialized in technology-focused courses for students, grades 9 through 12, as well as for members of the United States military and their families. Giant Campus was geared towards developing original course content, mapping to both the Washington Career and Technical Education and Texas Essential Knowledge and Skills frameworks in business innovation, computer science, and digital arts.

== Founder ==
Giant Campus was founded in 1997, by president and chief executive officer Pete Findley. The idea came when Findley was a business school student at the University of Washington and created a detailed business plan for a network of summer camps to teach middle and high school kids new media skills—including multimedia and web design on college campuses. This project earned him first place in a statewide business plan competition, along with $15,000 in seed money to launch Giant Campus. Within five years, Giant Campus was running Cybercamps at more than 70 colleges, including programs in China, Hong Kong, Korea and Saudi Arabia.

In 2008, Findley was named Ernst & Young Entrepreneur of the Year in the Pacific Northwest.
