= Edgenuity =

Online learning resource

- Former name: Education2020/E2020 (1998–2013)
- Website type: Online education
- Founded: 1998; 28 years ago
- Headquarters: Scottsdale, Arizona, U.S.
- Founder: Sari Factor
- Key people: Jonathan Grayer (CEO)
- Services: Online education
- Employees: 2,000
- Parent: Imagine Learning
- Website: imaginelearning.com/products/imagine-edgenuity

Edgenuity, formerly Education2020 (E2020), is an online learning resource for school districts founded by the American company Imagine Learning. The platform teaches students in kindergarten through 12th grade in core, elective, credit recovery, technical, and career subjects. As of 2019, Edgenuity instructs over four million students in the United States. Edgenuity lessons are also the foundation of the online learning curriculum Time4Learning.

== History ==
=== 1998–2016: Origins and lobbying convictions ===
Edgenuity was established in 1998 under the name Education2020 Inc. (E2020). In 2011, the company Weld North purchased Edgenuity for an estimated $50 million USD. In 2011, Weld North also acquired Giant Campus. In 2013, Education2020 was renamed to Edgenuity. In 2014, Edgenuity launched My Path, a program learning path alternative for reading and math for grades 6 through 12. In the same year, Edgenuity partnered with SOPHIA Learning to offer additional credit options.

Edgenuity saw an increase of usage in the 2010s; from 2012 to 2014, Edgenuity paid politician Mike Hubbard in an act of lobbying US$210,000, including a series of weekly checks worth US$7,500 each titled "lobbying services". According to Michael Humphrey, the executive vice president of Edgenuity, who testified in court, the act was done "to open doors"; he intended to use Hubbard to secure and engage future meetings with higher legislative members. Hubbard was sentenced to four years in prison for ethical violations according to state laws. State School Board member Mary Scott Hunter emailed Superintendent Tommy Bice about the matter in March 2015, but he never replied and retired less than thirty days later.

=== 2020–2021: COVID-19 pandemic ===
Edgenuity became a popular tool for remote learning during the COVID-19 pandemic. Due to stay-at-home orders and schools needing an alternative teaching source, Edgenuity experienced a massive spike in usage, resulting in slow servers and site crashes; many schools reported issues with the site in its early stages of the pandemic. The number of new users caused a lack of course instructor employees, but this issue was later addressed. School districts reported that Edgenuity was a popular choice mainly because of a lack of other options.

By 2021, the COVID-19 pandemic resulted in the admission of 500 school districts to the service, earning the company US$145 million in profit—double what the company made the year prior—due to the spike in Edgenuity usage alongside other learning platforms acquired by the company before the pandemic began.

In 2021, CEO Sari Factor released a statement addressing the issues raised by the public. She criticized districts using the site without the supervision of a teacher and stated that schools that were following procedures were benefiting from the program. She also mentioned how the student-to-teacher ratio was off-balance due to the school's lack of employment and also attributed student struggles to the impact of COVID-19 on the system and education.

== Education style ==
Edgenuity is a virtual alternative that uses pre-recorded videos and primarily caters to struggling students and maintaining a consistent pace. Along with pre-recorded lectures, Edgenuity uses interactive and real-world problems. Besides helping students who need extra support, schools often use the software to assist students who have failed courses in earning missing credits.

== Awards and nominations ==
In 2020, Digital Promise awarded Imagine Edgenuity's Courseware, Mypath, and Pathblazer services with the Research-Based Design Product Certification.

== Reception ==
During the site's peak popularity following the pandemic, both parents and students complained about how Edgenuity was frustrating, stating difficulties in loading, understanding concepts, and the inability to skip newly presented content. The pass and fail content mostly comprises quizzes at the end of each lesson, and parents observed students were memorizing the answers to recurring questions instead of truly learning the material. Parents have also cited the function of tutoring help, where students can get aid from a real teacher when they encounter a difficult question. Some students complained about long waiting times, some waiting hours, for virtual tutor assistance. According to Angie Richardson, a parent of a 13-year-old student interviewed by BuzzFeed News's Erik Carter, both virtual tutoring and emails were often slow and sometimes entirely unresponsive. Her child was ultimately required to return to brick and mortar due to falling behind.

Edgenuity has been criticized for the standardization of their test questions, making it simple for students to cheat on tests. The nature of the standardization causes students who failed a test to receive a remarkably similar set of questions on their second attempt, making it easy to guess answers via trial and error. A study published by Slate Magazine showed that students using Edgenuity received, on average, 37 out of 50 identical questions during their second attempt to pass a test. Another study from The Verge discovered short-answer questions are graded through artificial intelligence, and students have found methods to cheat using keywords the AI is looking for to give passing grades. The Verge cited a teacher whose student was using the site who inserted words in an order that was patent nonsense yet included words that were involved in answering the question, dubbed a "word salad", and received full credit for the response.

Teachers also showed frustration with how Edgenuity handles student organization in their contracts. In Providence, Rhode Island, teachers were given an average of 52 students to handle each and could not effectively communicate with all of them in an organized manner. In St. Tammany Parish, Louisiana, some teachers were even assigned up to 600 students to manage through email each.
