= Homeschooling and distance education in Australia =

In Australia, homeschooling is becoming increasingly popular. It is legal in all Australian states and territories, with each having its own regulations around the practice. Distance education (commonly known as external studies in Australia) is also prevalent for Australians who live in remote, rural areas. There are more than a dozen universities in Australia that support distance education for tertiary studies. Some Australians switch between distance education and classroom teaching. The number of homeschooled children and students who take distance education in Australia is approximately 30,000. The number of registered homeschoolers alone was 21,437 in 2019; this corresponds to 0.5 per cent of the total school population of Australia. In the 2010s, the average growth rate of the practice amounted to 9.4 per cent per year. The largest Christian school of distance education in Australia is the Australian Christian College, which has over 1,700 families with 4,000 students enrolled. Homeschooling generally enjoys a very good reputation in the Australian media and is widely seen as a flexible alternative form of education with good socialisation opportunities in the community.

== History ==
=== Homeschooling ===
In 1995, Roland Meighan of Nottingham School of Education estimated some 20,000 families homeschooling in Australia. Homeschooling since 2006 requires government registration, with different requirements from state to state. Some home educators prefer to be regulated, but others question whether the government has any legitimate authority to oversee the choices parents make to raise and educate their children. Curricular help is offered by the Australian Government. In 2006, Victoria passed legislation, requiring the registration of children up to the age of 16 and increasing the school leaving age to 16 from the previous 15, undertaking home education (registration is optional for those age of 16–17 but highly recommended). The Victorian Registration and Qualifications Authority (VRQA) is the registering body. Philip Strange of Home Education Association, Inc. very roughly estimated the number of homeschoolers to be 26,500 in 2011.

=== Distance education ===
Compulsory school attendance was established in Victoria in 1872. However, children and parents in rural and remote areas of the state were facing major problems of accessing schools and therefore, regular school attendance could not be guaranteed. As an answer to this, correspondence schooling was introduced, whereby young teachers were employed in remote areas of Victoria. Victoria was the first state in Australia to do so, others came after in the following years. Today, distance learning is virtually only carried out via the Internet.

== Motivations for homeschooling ==
Reasons for Australian people to choose homeschooling are often lifestyle choices; some people choose to home educate so that they can travel and spend better time with their children. Some children learn differently to the general crowd and can get bored or can struggle at school, where the teachers are unable to cater for the individuality of each child. Other often cited reasons for choosing homeschooling in Australia include religious or philosophical conviction and bullying in or dissatisfaction with school, as well as special needs. School closures and subsequent distance learning during the COVID-19 pandemic were motivating factors for parents to homeschool as well.

== Organisations ==
In Australia, many organisations exist to help parents and teachers with home education. Every Australian state has at least one support group for home education. The Home Education Association, Inc (HEA) is Australia's national advocacy organisation. It is a not-for-profit, member-funded charity which began in 2001 to support home educators across Australia. The association is run by volunteers from the home education community and offers a free phone helpline and registration support in each state or territory. The HEA does not produce educational material but offers substantial discounts to its members to third-party educational curriculum. The HEA advocates in the interest of home educators in all states and territories, with each state regulated by different Education Acts.

One of the most popular schools for distance learning in Western Australia is the School of Isolated and Distance Education (SIDE).

== See also ==
- Education in Australia
- School of the Air
