= Homeschooling in South Africa =

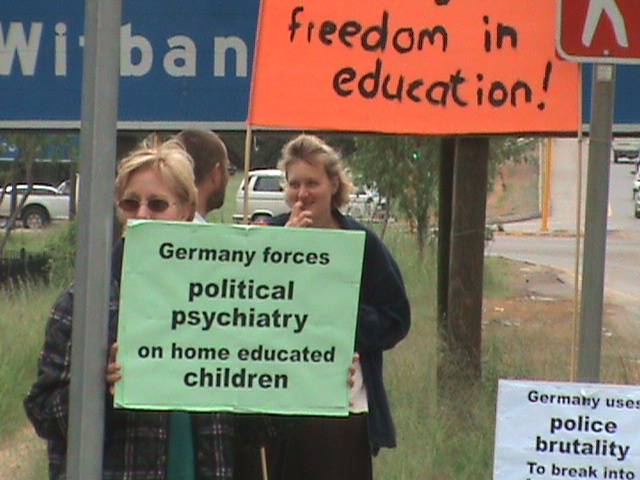
Protest against the persecution of homeschooling in South Africa at the Deutsche Schule in Pretoria in 2007

Homeschooling in South Africa (also known as home education or unschooling there) had been illegal, until it was recognized in 1996 under the South African School Legislation, since then it has grown significantly.

Notable moments in the history of homeschooling are provided below. Most of the content comes directly from primary sources and has not been documented anywhere yet:

== 1868-1900 ==
Dr Andrew Murray was the only minister in the Nederduitsch Gereformeerde (NG) church in the Free State and Transvaal, and he was based in Bloemfontein. He was tasked to travel through both republics baptizing people, giving catechism and performing marriage ceremonies. Dr. Murray was surprised that he very seldom found young people that were illiterate, in reading, writing and arithmetic and this despite the fact that there were no schools in the area traveled. Nomad farmers bordering the north east of the Cape Colony in the eighteen hundreds had no schools, teachers or religious ministers, and yet literacy was a universal occurrence.

== 1900-1991 ==
Government schools increased in implementation and the freedom of home schooling was increasingly limited. By the 1990s only a few families were allowed to homeschool under severe restrictions, if they could have their children exempted from compulsory school attendance. That was only granted up to Grade 3, if the family lived more than 80 km from the nearest school and if the child(ren) were taught by a teacher qualified to teach the junior primary phase.

== 1992 ==
The Association for Homeschooling is established.

== 1993 (Homeschoolers jailed) ==
On 14 December 1993 Andre and Bokkie Meintjies were sentenced to prison because their children did not attend formal school. In a court case that lasted for almost five years, Andre was sentenced to two years and Bokkie one year in separate jails in Johannesburg, and this while their three children were placed in an orphanage in the Eastern Cape to prevent contact between the parents and children. Several other parents were given suspended sentences on condition they put their children in schools. All of those parents still have criminal records.

== 1994 ==
A group action was launched by the Association for Homeschooling and the Home School Legal Defense Association (HSLDA) from the USA that led to release of both Bokkie and Andre. The Meintjies couple were however released six months later under a blanket amnesty for prisoners with the implementation of the new constitution.

== 1995 ==
Concept legislation was published to the effect that home schooling was to be illegal in South Africa. This led to a campaign being launched by home school leaders like Leendert van Oostrum, Graham Shortridge and Kate Durham with the HSLDA. Thousands of home schoolers in the USA wrote letters to the South African embassy in the US in support of this campaign. In that time, SA was still expecting to receive large grants from America, and American public opinion was taken seriously.

== 1996 (SA Schools Act acknowledges home education) ==
In November of this year the SA Schools Act was promulgated wherein home schooling was recognized. In December of the same year, the new constitution of South Africa was accepted, in which the legal status of home schooling was entrenched more securely. The act requires that every home learner be registered with the relevant provincial education department – unless there is good reason not to.

== 1998 ==
The Pestalozzi Trust is established in accordance with a brief from the general meeting of the Association for Homeschooling to serve as a legal fund to ensure the continued freedom and to promote such freedom.

== 1999 ==
Mr. Kader Asmal publishes the national policy concerning the registration of home schoolers, wherein the input from both the home schooling contingent and the provincial education departments is totally ignored. The Pestalozzi Trust advises home schoolers that the policy is in direct conflict with the SA Schools Act, and therefore not enforceable.

== 2001 - 2002 (Persecution of Doddie Kleynhans and Promulgation of NCS) ==
- Feb : In February 2001 the police accompanied by the media arrived at the home of Doddie Kleyhans to arrest her. Within three minutes The Pestalozzi Trust had an attorney on the line to the senior police officer on the scene. The attorney made it clear to the policeman that the whole issue was not arrest worthy, and that it was completely sufficient to warn her that a case was being investigated against her. This they did. And Beeld newspaper carried a front-page article about the issue. The posters against lampposts led with "Government vs Mother". Due to great pressure from the office of the minister of education, the case was never closed but also never prosecuted. Till her death the cloud of prosecution hung over Doddie.
- Oct : The Constitutional Court rules that the case of Harris that policies such as the registration of home schoolers may not be enforced on them.
- Jun - Nov : The draft NCS was released on 30 July 2001 for public comment and the closing date for comment was on 12 October.

The National Curriculum statement claims that it is based on the Manifesto, although the final publication of the Manifesto was only released after the National Curriculum Statement (NCS). It is put this way in the policy document in the NCS (pg.7). "The Manifesto on Values, Education and Democracy (Department of Education, 2001) identifies ten fundamental values of the Constitution…The Manifesto further identifies sixteen strategies to acquaint young South Africans with the values of the Constitution. This strategy is articulated in the Revised National Curriculum Statement and includes the following:…" This time delay indicates that the values upon which the NCS is based, were established long beforehand, and that the process used to compose the manifesto is deceptive. Many groups have objections against this Curriculum statement. The most important points of criticism against the National curriculum are the following:

a) It attempts to transfer the values of the Inter-faith religion to pupils. For those who wish to find out more about this aspect of the curriculum, the video “Die Intergeloofs – en New Age infiltrasie in die onderwys” by Sarel van der Merwe is strongly recommended. In Gr. 1 the following is expected: “Matches symbols associated with a range of religions in South Africa” From Gr. 4 pupils the following is expected: “demonstrate planning and skillful use of design elements in creating masks based on various nature gods of different cultures;” Gr. 6 pupils must “Finds out about, tries out and explains a song-dance ritual (e.g. snake dance, rain dance, wedding dance circle dance, reed dance, stick dance), referring to its purpose and structure - patterns, repetition and sequence.”

b) Sex education from a secular perspective forms an integral part of the NCS. In Gr. 1 a pupil is expected to do the following: “Recognises situations that may be, or may lead to, sexual abuse,...” In Gr. 6 the following is expected: “Explains causes of communicable diseases (including HIV/AIDS) and available cures, and evaluates prevention strategies, in relation to community norms and personal values.”

c) It attempts to break down cultural diversity and to transfer the culture of the regime’s fabricated ‘Rainbow Nation’. In the learning area of Social Science, the French Huguenots, the British settlers and the Great Trek are not addressed. Western History is overwhelmingly portrayed in a negative light. Instead of his own history, for example the Afrikaans child is instructed in African civilizations in South Africa prior to 1600; inequality in existence, slavery etc. For instance, in Gr. 7 the following is expected of pupils: : “Composes music, songs or jingles about human rights issues or to accompany a performance or presentation about human rights.”The summary of the NCS puts it this way: “The promotion of values is important not only for personal development, but also to ensure that a national South African identity is built on values that differ from those which undergirded apartheid education

The following facts indicate that the aim of the department of education was to get this document approved without parents, teachers and school governing bodies noticing it and having enough time to react meaningfully.

a) The document consists of 1 400 pages, available only in English, and makes liberal use of terms with which the average parent is not familiar. An example is the sentence, “An outcomes-based framework uses assessment methods that are able to accommodate divergent contextual factors.” It would be quite justifiable to ask whether it is fair to expect average parents to be able to react meaningfully to such a document while they are busy at the same time with their normal daily routine.

b) Although there are 29 000 schools in South Africa, excluding University Departments and Teacher training colleges, only 11 000 copies of the NCS were printed. Seeing as it is unlikely that the education department does not know how many schools there are in the country, this indicates that the intention of the education department was that the document would not be distributed to all schools, let alone to all teachers and parents. Some regional offices only notified schools on 4 October that they could view the NCS at the offices of specific officials. Given that it is an almost impossible task to adequately study and evaluate a document of 1 400 pages in somebody else’s office within a period of 8 days, it indicates that it was not the intention of the education department to give teachers time to study the document and react meaningfully to it.

d) In general, the education department reacted badly to requests from the public for the NCS to be posted to them.

e) On the web page of the education department there was a hyperlink to the NCS from the main page. The hyperlink was removed two weeks before the closing date for comment.

f) The education department did not take the trouble to make schools aware of the release of the NCS. In a survey of 100 schools in Gauteng in the last week of September, only 3 schools were aware of the NCS and only 2 had seen copies of it.

Notwithstanding these obstacles, there was overwhelming reaction from the public against the NCS. The reaction consisted of thousands of letters to the press, letters to the education department and calls to parliamentarians. All of the large denominations in South Africa strongly criticised the curriculum.

After the closing date, on 13 November 2001, public hearings were held, during which organisations could give oral input on the NCS. Although everybody could apply to make representation, the minister was able to choose whom he would allow to make representation. Although the minister said on radio the previous day that everybody would be heard, he only asked 19 organisations for input. The larger Afrikaans churches and Christian private schools were among those not permitted an opportunity to give input. During the public hearing there were demonstrations against the NCS in Cape Town and Pretoria.

In spite of the public reaction, the final NCS was promulgated on 31 May 2002, with no important changes. Some of the most repulsive sections were taken out of the learning area Life Skills and hidden away in the learning area Art and Culture.

Anyone who did not go through the whole curriculum diligently would not have noticed this subtle shift. Click here to view submissions, presentations and media releases from that period.

== 2004 (Gauteng meetings) ==
The Gauteng department of education arranges a series of meetings to try and intimidate parents to register and to demand compliance to a range of irregular demands. Representatives of the Pestalozzi Trust and the Association for Homeschooling attended all the meetings. The officials only wanted to discuss the registration process, and interactive discussion with homeschooling parents was strongly discouraged.

== 2005 (Department performs internal research) ==
In 2005 the Department of Basic Education (DBE) advertised for tenders for research on home education in South Africa. The budget was small and the terms of reference very restrictive. A tender by Wits Education Policy Unit was accepted, and they submitted their report in 2008. The research report recommends that The only option for parents who do not want their children to be taught the national curriculum is to leave the country or send their children for education abroad.

== 2007 (Home education banned in Germany) ==
In opposition of the prosecution of home schoolers in Germany, the Association for Homeschooling holds a protest at the Deutsche Schule in Pretoria to bring this to the attention of the German community.

== 2008 (New regulations for NSC) ==
New regulations on the administration of matric were promulgated. These regulations require that learners must complete Gr. 10 and Gr. 11 in order to be admitted to write the Gr. 12 exam. Whereas it was possible for homelearners to obtain a matric in less than a year at a cost of about R1000, it will now take 3 years at a cost of about R30 000. Due to this increase in duration and cost of the National Senior Certificate, international matric qualifications such as Cambridge (UK) and General Educational Development (USA) became increasingly popular under homeschoolers.

== 2009 (Policy revision process starts) ==
In 2009 the Department of Education started the process of revising to Home Education Policy, when Ms. Mapaseka Letho from Department of Education requested Mr. Leendert van Oostrum to provide comments on the current policy and recommendations for revision. This initiative picked up momentum when the 2011 census reported that there were 56 000 home learners.

== 2010 (Western Cape intimidates homeschoolers & CAPS introduced) ==
The Association for Homeschooling launches an initiative for an independent website on home education. The website SAHomeschoolers.Org has since grown to the most comprehensive independent website concerning home schooling in South Africa. Home Schooling Expos become more commonplace. Since this year there are annual expos in Johannesburg, Cape Town, Durban and George.

- Aug : The Western Cape Education Department (WCED) publishes a notice in local papers in which they state that parents must register before 30 Sep in the year before they start with home education and that home education must be in line with the National Curriculum Statement. As a reaction the Association for Homeschooling and the Pestalozzi Trust wrote a letter to the WCED. A deputation of the Association, the Pestalozzi Trust and Cape Home Educators had a meeting with officials of the WCED to explain the issues caused by the notice.
- Sep : The Department of Education releases CAPS documents for public comments. The Association for Home Education calls on home educators to analyse the documents and forwarded a consolidated list of objections to the Department of Education. The Association objects to CAPS, because it infringes on various constitutional rights. It infringes on the right to freedom of religion, because it does not make provision for teaching religions from a chosen religious perspective. It infringes on the rights of schools and parents the choose the education in the best interest of their learners. It infringes on political freedom, because it promotes a specific political agenda. It infringes on children's right to parental care, because it transmits values that conflict with the values of parents. The first letter to the department contains a table with all the objections to CAPS. The follow-up letter contains a summary of the main objections to CAPS.

== 2011 (Home education in census) ==
- Mar : In a court case between the BCVO and the Minister of Education, Judge Cynthia Pretorius makes a remark that the national curriculum is not binding on independent schools and parents that home school their children.
- Oct : In the Census of 2011 there is a question about home education (Question P-18) for the first time. In the question about which type of education institution is attended, there was an option to select home education. According to the results, 56 857 learners receive home education in South Africa.

== 2012 (Home education discussed in parliament) ==
- Aug : In a Portfolio Committee meeting on Basic Education on 7 August 2012 the Department of Education stated that “the Department is currently developing policy in respect of home schooling”* 8 : The Western Cape Education Department (WCED) publishes the same notice of 2010 in local papers again. The Association for Homeschooling wrote a response to this notice, which was published in a number of local paper.
- 6 Sep : In response to the above question, Ms Cherylynn Dudley (ACDP) asked the Minister of Basic Education when this policy will be available and what the content will be.
- 11 Sep : The minister responded that the policy will available April/May 2013, because they have to go through an extensive consultation process.

== 2013 (Home education discussed in parliament) ==
According to the results of the 2012 census, there are approximately 57000 home schooling students in South Africa. If all these learners were to be accommodated in schools, 130 schools would be required as well as 2000 teachers. Currently the government is saving approximately R700 million per year because the government is not paying for the education of these children.

- 7 May : The Association for Homeschooling requested Ms Cherylynn Dudley (ACDP) to ask the minister who the Department of Education has contacted during their "extensive consultation process".
- 12 Aug : Ms Cherylynn Dudley (ACDP) asked the minister who the Department of Education has contacted during their "extensive consultation process".
- 2 Sep : The minister responds and states that no homeschooling organisations have been consulted, but that she is open to work with homeschooling organisations.

== 2014 (Western Cape issues draft policy) ==
At the start of the year Pestalozzi Trust publishes an article "Homeschooling running into heavy weather".

- 7 Feb : Referring to the minister's statement that she is open to work with homeschooling organisation, Cape Home Educators sends a letter to the Minister of Education putting it on record that they represent homeschooling families in the Western Cape. A copy is sent to the Western Cape Department of Education.
- 11 Feb : In response to the above letter, the WCED sends a copy of the draft policy on home education stating to Cape Home Educators : The Provincial Minister of Education in the Western Cape is in the process of finalising the Policy on Education at Home for this province" " This policy is widely distributed to homeschoolers.
- 12 Feb : Many homeschooling parents write letters to and phone the Democratic Alliance (DA) councilor in their area, because the Western Cape is ruled by the DA.
- 12 Feb : Leendert van Oostrum publishes a Fact Sheet on the Draft policy on Home Education of the Western Cape Education Department.
- 13 Feb : The Western Cape Minister of Education, min. Donald Grant responds to an enquiry from a councilor as follows: "As you are now aware the WCED has circulated draft regulations for comment. There are sound reasons for regulation given the new CAPS and SBA requirements. The draft is simply out for comment and that is what the WCED requires - comment. Please request those who are up in arms to communicate their objections as requested to the WCED. The WCED in turn will collate all the objections and provide feedback to the Ministry."
- 13 Feb : In response to the message from min. Donald Grant, the Pestalozzi Trust writes a letter to the minister to justify why homeschooling parents are "up in arms" about the proposed policy by the WCED.
- 14 Feb : Clive Roos from the WCED issues the following statement : "The document currently in circulation on Home Schooling has no formal status. It has not been seen by the Minister, the Head of Education or any formal structure within the WCED. The document has been withdrawn with immediate effect by the Head of Education and the WCED apologises unreservedly for any concerns which its appearance has caused."
- Mar : The DBE published a research report with the title "Report on Curriculum provisioning and delivery of Home Education in general education and training band (Grade R-9)" on Academia.edu. This report recommends that service providers must be registered and required to extend their curriculum to 11 official languages, qualifications of parents should be considered during registration and providers who offer Bible should compile a single curriculum.
- 4 Mar : The Western Cape Education Department publishes the same notice on Home Education in the press. In 2010 and 2012 the notice was only published in local newspapers, but this time it was also published in large papers such as Die Burger.
- Apr : A national home education magazine "Learning @ Home" was launched this month. The newsletter of the Cape Home Educators (CHE) was expanded to become national magazine. It is published quarterly and distributed in electronic format for free.
- 11 Aug : The Pestalozzi Trust receives a reply to a letter that the Pestalozzi Trust wrote on 6 September 2010 from Donald Grant, the DA minister of education in the Western Cape. The reply was dated 27 October 2012, but the Pestalozzi Trust only received this letter on 11 August 2014. Since homeschooling parents view education as a responsibility of parents, the closing paragraph was particularly alarming. It reads : The provision of education is a state function, and where the state has granted permission in terms of due process as prescribed, it must support and monitor the provision of private education and home education.
- 9, 10 October : Homeschool Associations from all over South Africa and the Pestalozzi Trust met with Department of Basic Education (DBE) on 9,10 October to discuss new policy on Home Education. Homeschool representatives experienced the meeting positively, because they received ample time to present their case. DBE experienced the presentations by the representatives as well researched and providing valuable insights.

== 2015 (KZN court case) ==
After the meetings in October, it was the intention to have follow-up meetings in January 2015. As the date of the follow-up meeting approached, the meeting was postponed to February 2015, in order to provide more time to the DBE to prepare for the meeting. Two weeks before this meeting, representatives requested that the agenda and working documents be sent to them as a matter of common courtesy. Soon after this representatives were informed that the meeting was postponed indefinitely.

Middle June, representatives received another invite for a meeting on 2 and 3 July, with a proposed agenda and an updated Discussion Document by dr. Trevor Coombe. The representatives were surprised by the updated discussion document. This document confirmed that the DBE was indeed willing to attempt to understand home education, because a number of significant paradigms shifts have been made since the previous Discussion Document that was presented in October 2014. In the preparation for the meeting, the agenda was changed a few times. The Association for Homeschooling managed to reserve more than 90 minutes of the agenda for a screening of the "Class Dismissed" movie.

- April : The Doe family (name changed) in KwaZulu-Natal was ripped apart. The Children's court ordered that the three young children be removed and placed in the care of their grandparents, where they are compelled to attend school. The only reason for removing the children provided by the court and the social workers is that the children don't attend school. This case is similar to the case of Domenic Johansonn in Sweden
- 2, 3 July : The second meeting between representatives from homeschool associations and the Department of Basic Education took place. The homeschool representatives were encouraged by the paradigm shifts that were made by DBE.
- October - December : The working group was scheduled to meet every month from October to March. Three homeschooling individuals were invited to join these meeting. The first meeting was attended by Leendert van Oostrum and Joy Leavesley. Bouwe van der Eems, the third invitee, was unable to travel from Cape Town at short notice. From the start of the first working group meeting, it was made abundantly clear that a different dynamic was at work. During his opening remarks, for example, the chairman (the same Dr Simelane) claimed that "children belong to the state". He proceeded to make it clear that those present were not there to represent their own stakeholder groups – they represented no-one except the Department of Basic Education. Very soon, it became obvious that the policy to be written would not represent anything that was presented by homeschool organisations during the consultation sessions. Instead, the discussions were aimed at implementing the original objective of the education minister – to bring home education in conformance with "the formal education system". It became apparent to the two homeschoolers present that they were there only so that their names could be listed in the final policy proposal as "members of the working group", giving the impression that homeschoolers were in support of the final proposals. During the second day, Leendert and Joy withdrew as members of the working group, but stated that they remained willing as resources to assist when needed. Only one of the three homeschoolers who had been invited on the working groups had not withdrawn – Bouwe van der Eems from Cape Town, who did not attend the first work group meeting. He was also unable to travel to Pretoria for the second meeting in November. Karin van Oostrum, another trustee of the Pestalozzi Trust, represented Bouwe at the November meeting. Karin's impressions of the second meeting were the same as those of the two who had withdrawn during the first meeting. Before the third meeting Karin also withdrew.
- Sep - Dec : In April the children of the Doe (real name withheld) family of KwaZulu-Natal have been removed from their parents by social workers for "not attending school". The only reasons given to the court were that the children were not attending schools and that their parents were allegedly "indoctrinating" the children with their religious beliefs. After this, the Pestalozzi Trust became involved. In December their three eldest children (of whom the youngest is only three years old) were permanently returned to the care of their parents by the children's court, and set aside all the previous court orders. The court also refused to accept the recommendations of the social worker and other "interested parties" that the court orders the social worker to supervise the family's homeschooling for a year. He commented that there is nothing wrong when parents bring up their children in their own beliefs, and that such an upbringing makes the children better people. He also made it very clear that, in his view, these children should never have been before the court in the first place - the matter should have been dealt with by other means.

== 2016 (Home Education goes Global) ==
- March 2016 : The Global Home Education Conference (GHEC) 2016 took place in Rio de Janeiro, Brazil. The Pestalozzi Trust Board of Trustees sent three of the trustees to the conference in Brazil, namely Leendert van Oostrum, Karin van Oostrum and Bouwe van der Eems.
- October 2016 : The Pestalozzi Trust announced that its founder and chairman, Leendert van Oostrum died. Click here for an overview of his life. This was a great loss for the Pestalozzi trust. However, since the Pestalozzi Trust is essential for the continued existence of home education in South Africa, the trustees were determined to ensure that the trust continues to operate and grow its influence. After the death of Leendert van Oostrum, the previous chairman and Manager of the Pestalozzi Trust, the Trustees resolved that the following three Trustees will fill the void left by Leendert's demise. Mr Bouwe van der Eems was appointed as chairman. Mrs Karin van Oostrum was appointed as Manager and Advocate André Williams supports the Executive as a legal consultant.

== 2017 (BELA Bill and draft policy on home education) ==
- 13 Oct : The DBE invited public comment on the draft Basic Education Laws Amendment Bill (BELA Bill) gazetted in Government Gazette no. 41178 and released via www.gpwonline.co.za. The Pestalozzi Trust, other associations of home educators and individual home educators only became aware of this in the course of the week-end of 14 and 15 October. If a vigilant home educator did not notice this in a press article and alert organisations of home educators, the deadline for comment could easily have passed by without any comment or input from the home education community. The closing date for submissions was 10 November. The most important changes that the bill introduces are the following:
  1. The content and skills of the curriculum to be used by home learners must be at least comparable to the national curriculum.
  2. Home learners must be assessed annually by registered assessors.
  3. Home learners are not allowed to enrol for alternative matric qualifications such as Cambridge and GED.
  4. The penalty for not registering for home education is increased from 6 months to 6 years.
- 18 Oct : The Pestalozzi Trust and associations and individual parents requested that the closing date is extended. Reasons for an extension include: home educators have been procedurally prejudiced by lack of prior notice; the prescribed comment period (October–November) is a period of preparation for and taking of exams for home educating families; the need for detailed consultation with members before responding; the impacts of the proposed changes are not merely technical, but may have multiple complex substantive financial, curricular, time, and legal impacts on home educating families and their supporting and representative organisations; the changes do not merely edit elements of the previous law but include entirely new provisions; many consequences thereof that may be unintended by the authors of the proposal bill and if not remedied may lead to unnecessary litigation which is neither in the interests of the Department of Basic Education, home educators nor any other party; homeschool organisations will need to take legal counsel on constitutional and other issues after consulting our members.
- 10 Nov : The Pestalozzi Trust and all the homeschool associations submitted their comments on the BELA Bell to the Department of Basic Education (DBE). Parents were also encouraged to send their comments in their own words. A total of about 1000 letters from homeschoolers were sent to the DBE. Some of these letters were sent as anonymous submissions to the Pestalozzi Trust. The main objections to the BELA Bill were the following:
  1. The provision that home learners must register with the state is unreasonable and negatively affects the interests of children. It is untenable that parents, who are primarily responsible for the education of their children, require permission from the state to choose home education.
  2. The requirement that the proposed home education programme must cover contents and skills comparable to the national curriculum prohibits parents from choosing a curriculum or educational approach that would be in the best interests of the child, and which would not necessarily cover comparable skills and contents.
  3. The requirement for annual assessments by external assessors serves no educational purpose, covertly enforces the National Curriculum and will be costly to homeschooling parents and the taxpayer.
  4. The provision to outlaw alternative matric qualifications such as Cambridge and GED would give rise to the creation of a class of persons so disadvantaged that this would be in violation of the fundamental principle of equality which underlies the provisions of the Constitution. Secondly, the requirement that any person wishing to gain the National Senior Certificate should have to follow a three-year programme in order to do so significantly limits the rights of such a person to education.
  5. The provision to outlaw alternative curricula and matric qualification would give an unfair financial advantage to CAPS compliant curriculum providers.

To ensure that statements on the negative consequences of the proposed bill can be proven empirically, homeschooling parents were requested to complete a survey. A total of 2750 parents completed the survey.

- 14 Nov : The Western Cape Education Department submits objections to BELA Bill. Except for a question on foreign qualifications, WCED does not have any objections on the home education provisions.Wayback Machine
- 17 Nov : The Department of Basic Education released a draft policy on home education with 21 days to provide comments.
- 22 Nov : The Pestalozzi Trust sent a letter to the Department of Basic Education requesting and extension of the closing date for comments to the draft policy on home education. The reasons are similar to the reasons given to request and extension of the BELA Bill.
- 28 Nov : Parliament's oversight education committee has taken the exceptional step of calling a hearing – before the legislation is even tabled. In their presentation, DBE Director General Mathanzima Mweli said ‘the word avalanche would not describe’ the submissions they had received ‘and that he had never seen it in his career in public service’. Democratic Alliance (DA) Shadow Minister of Basic Education Ian Ollis said "the reason you are getting such an avalanche is because you are tampering with the democratic rights of parents with this bill". Ollis objected to the Director General saying they would be "processing inputs" without saying "they would be considering amendments". He objected to the Director General's proposal to hold hearings in which to ‘educate the public about the bill’, which wrongly assumed they were uninformed and needed education until they agreed. He said they "needed to listen to the public". The public participation process was also criticized by the ACDP and even ANC members of parliament. The meeting was extraordinary in a number of respects: First, a bill is normally only discussed in parliament after it is finalised and referred by cabinet. Second, the DBE sent their top officials to the meeting instead of a cabinet meeting discussing on education held at the same time. Third, they deferred to next year another scheduled parliamentary education briefing because after all the questions from parliamentarians, there was no time left for further discussion. Fourth, normally restrained ruling party parliamentarians showed strong independence, asking tough questions and making strong comments. Fifth, because a parliamentary committee requested the education department to extend the time for comment and received agreement. Sixth, strong feelings led the chair to calm the meeting. Seventh, a concerned mom brought her few month old baby, likely the youngest attendee of a parliamentary briefing, much to the delight of female parliamentarians. At the end of the session, Deputy Minister of Basic Education Enver Surty, granted an extension of time for public comment on the Basic Education Laws Amendment Bill (BELA) till 10 January 2018.

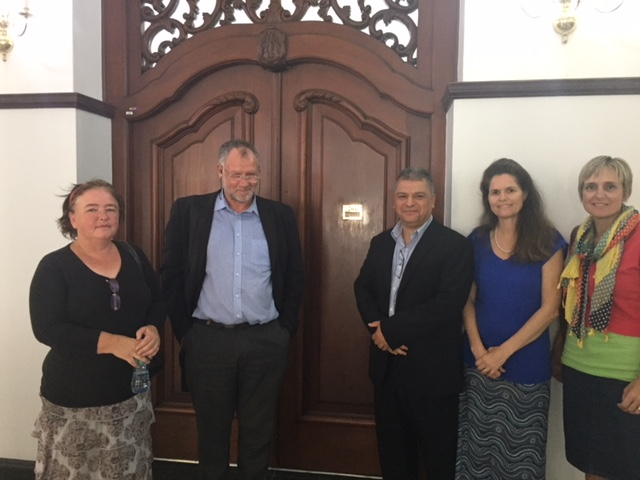
Homeschoolers at briefing on BELA Bill

- 5 Dec : The Progress in International Reading Literacy Study (PIRLS) measured literacy levels between 2011 & 2016 and has found 78% of the Gr. 4 pupils who took part are functionally illiterate and South Africa scored the lowest out of 50 countries globally.
- 8 Dec : The Pestalozzi Trust and all the homeschool associations submitted their comments on the Draft Policy on Home Education to the Department of education. Parents were also encouraged to send their comments in their own words. A total of about 750 letters were sent to the Department of Basic Education, including letters requesting an extension of the closing as well as comments on the policy. Some of these letters were sent as anonymous submissions to the Pestalozzi Trust. The main objections to the policy are as follows:
  1. A flawed consultation process means that there has not been the required meaningful consultation, and because home educators have not had sufficient input into the policy provisions, the Draft policy itself betrays a number of flaws.
  2. In general terms, the Draft Policy is flawed: while it asserts a very powerful set of constitutional and home education principles, it fails to translate those into a workable policy. In fact, it could be said that the practical provisions of the Draft Policy are diametrically opposed to the principles on which the Draft Policy is based.
  3. To further compound this problem, the Draft Policy is based on both the South African Schools Act (No. 84 of 1996) and the BELA Bill. It is highly problematic that a draft policy is being based on the provisions of a proposed bill that is still subject to the public comment process and parliamentary review.
  4. Underlying the above is the fact that the Draft Policy conflates home education and public education. These underlying flaws have led to a policy that is unworkable in practice, and will merely contribute to increased non-compliance by parents, and increased conflict between parents and education officials.
  5. The Draft Policy does not treat parents and children with dignity, as required by the founding provisions of the South African constitution.
- 11 Dec : Ms Phindile Ngcobo from the Department of Basic Education informed the Pestalozzi Trust that the Minister has granted extension till 31 January 2018 for comments to the draft policy on home education.
- 14 Dec : The Pestalozzi Trust delivers 430 anonymous comments to the BELA Bill at the offices of the Department of Basic Education.

== 2018 (Home Education Policy published) ==
- 16 July : In the week of 16 July 2018 the Pestalozzi Trust was tipped off that the Department of Basic Education (DBE) planned to approve the new policy, regardless of the flawed public participation process that was followed. When the Pestalozzi Trust was informed that the Council of Education Ministers (CEM) would discuss the policy on 16 July (the week of Mandela day), there was no option but to raise a red alert to homeschooling families. Parents were requested to contact the DBE and request a copy of the policy and an opportunity to engage with the CEM. The reaction of homeschoolers was amazing. In the week of 16 July the DBE was flooded with an estimated 600 - 1000 letters and telephone calls.
- 30 July : The DBE issued a media release in which it was confirmed that the CEM approved the policy on home education. The DBE described the concerned parents that contacted the DBE as "spammers". Although a campaign of a similar magnitude caused the City of Cape Town to stop the implementation of a water tariff, the DBE justified its decision to ignore parents by describing them as a "small group", as if there is a large group of parents that supports the policy.
- 16 Aug : ACDP MP Cheryllyn Dudley said in parliament that "DBE will be wasting money if the Minister promulgates the Policy on Home Education prematurely. There has been a fundamental misunderstanding between DBE and home education stakeholders resulting in a situation where the Minister of Basic Education is about to promulgate a Policy that is the result of a failed consultation process." "The ACDP also calls on the Basic Education Portfolio Committee to address this issue with the department and seriously interrogate the department’s handling of such an obviously important section of society during this review process.”
- 2 Nov : Representatives of the Cape Home Educators and Pestalozzi Trust had meeting with MEC for Education in the Western Cape, me. Debbie Schafer. In this meeting the representatives were informed that MEC Schafer supports the new Policy on Home Education.Liberty in Learning
- 16 Nov : The Policy on Home Education was published without any significant changes.

== 2019 (African Home Education Indaba) ==
- 15 May : An application for an administrative review of the Policy on Home Education by the Pestalozzi Trust was served at the Gauteng High Court on the 15th of May 2019.
- 17 - 19 Oct : The first African Home Education Indaba, was held in Pretoria from 17 to 19 October 2019. Delegates from Kenya, Uganda, Namibia, South Africa, USA, Canada and Russia gathered to confirm their solidarity as a global homeschooling movement. Policy-makers and government officials who attended the Indaba received solid researched information on all aspects of homeschooling. International researchers who attended the Indaba were Dr. Debra Bell, author and researcher from the US, and Dr. Brian Ray, from the National Home Education Research Institute in the USA. Research confirms that the amount and intensity of regulation of homeschooling does not contribute to the success of homeschoolers.

== 2020 (Roundtable and Parliament) ==
- 28 Feb : On 28 February 2020, the Minister of Education held a Roundtable discussion on Home Education with various stakeholders. Initially only curriculum providers were invited, but after the Pestalozzi Trust, Homeschooling Association SA Union, National and Provincial Homeschooling Associations and special interest groups got to know about the Roundtable and requested invites, they were also allotted seats for their delegates. The purpose of the meeting was to discuss the implementation of the policy. In her oral speech, the minister repeated at least twice: “Children belong to the state. They belong to the nation ...” However, she did make it clear that her context was in terms of the collective responsibility of South African Parents, teachers, and Government Departments to ensure the wellbeing of all children in South Africa insomuch as recognising their rights to a basic academic education of reasonable quality.
- Homeschooling associations published reports and articles on the Roundtable and its commissions. The Eastern Cape homeschooling association, one of the oldest in South Africa, published a detailed report on the event, which included slides from the commission feedback. During 2018 and 2019 an informal collaboration between various groups and associations for homeschooling had started mobilising themselves in an effort to form a unified and centralized base of operations for the community. These informal makeshift coalitions were invited as guests of the Homeschooling Association SA Union less than 2 days before the event. The DBE allotted them 8 seats which were offered to all the other attendees from the homeschooling community. The groups managed to fill only 5 of those seats due to the short notice. The first National Association for homeschooling had just formed a few months prior to the round table, and was represented by various provincial associations, the homeschooling Union and homeschooling representational groups for unique approaches such as Unschooling, and those who require specific recognition for Faith Based Religious education such as Islamic studies. The Roundtable event was considered by some associations to be the first move towards a more diverse inclusion of the community even though it ended with the DBE spokesperson surprisingly voicing conclusions of unanimous agreement to the terms of the homeschooling registration process. The Homeschooling Association SA Union contested this conclusion and noted that this was not in fact agreed to by the community due to the daunting and unreliable protocol, whereupon the Chief educational specialist and the Deputy minister agreed to submit a circular to the effect that parents will be ensured support and fair consideration for that purpose. The circular has not been forthcoming to date (September/2023)

== 2021 (The rise of Online Schools) ==
In 2021, homeschooling in South Africa experienced significant growth due to a combination of social, educational, and policy factors. The COVID-19 pandemic led to widespread school closures, prompting many families to adopt homeschooling or home-based learning, which in turn increased awareness and uptake of alternative education options. In September 2021, Impaq, one of South Africa's largest homeschooling curriculum providers, launched a fully-catered online school for learners in Grades 7–11. The initiative addressed the rising demand for structured online educational options, providing classes led by qualified teachers and serving as a bridge between traditional homeschooling and formal schooling structures.

Throughout 2021, homeschooling was increasingly recognized as a viable long-term alternative to traditional schooling, with families exploring tailored learning, curriculum flexibility, and personalized education beyond emergency lockdown measures. Policy discussions and regulatory debates were also active, as the Basic Education Laws Amendment (BELA) Bill was being drafted, with homeschooling organizations engaging with the Department of Basic Education on issues such as registration requirements and curriculum standards.

This growth was part of a broader trend where families, having experienced remote teaching, began re-evaluating the role of traditional schooling and exploring sustainable alternatives post-pandemic. Notably, CambriLearn, an online school founded in 2016, continued to provide structured, flexible homeschooling solutions and served as an early example of scalable online education in South Africa.

== 2022 (Many Families Stayed Online) ==
In 2022, homeschooling in South Africa continued to attract attention. Legislative focus intensified with the publication of the Basic Education Laws Amendment Bill (B2-2022), which proposed changes to the South African Schools Act affecting home education, including stricter registration requirements and increased oversight by provincial education authorities. The proposed amendments prompted public submissions and widespread debate throughout the year, with parents, civil society organisations, and education commentators expressing concerns regarding parental autonomy, administrative burden, and the constitutional balance between state oversight and the right to choose alternative forms of education. Independent reporting during 2022 also noted that many families who had adopted homeschooling during the COVID-19 pandemic continued with home-based education beyond emergency measures, reflecting a sustained shift in attitudes toward alternative education models. Alongside policy developments, homeschooling communities remained active across the country, organising regional expos and information events that highlighted ongoing engagement, resource sharing, and community coordination among home-educating families.
