= Time4Learning =

American homeschooling curriculum provider

- Type: Private
- Industry: Homeschooling
- Founded: 2003 (company) 2004 (program)
- Founder: John Edelson
- Headquarters: 17855 Dallas Pkwy Suite 400, Dallas, Texas, U.S.
- Area served: Worldwide (depends on country laws) (primarily serves the United States)
- Key people: Cheryl Dodge (president)
- Parent: Cambium Learning Group
- Website: time4learning.com

Time4Learning is an American homeschooling curriculum provider. It is based in Dallas, Texas. Cheryl Dodge is the president of the organization.

== History ==
Time4Learning was founded by John Edelson in 2003. and began providing online homeschooling through an online platform in 2004. In 2008, they started a program called VocabularySpellingCity for kindergarten through 12th grade pupils.

In 2018, Cambium Learning Group, an educational technology company, acquired Time4Learning.

As of November 2021, 175,000 students were using this platform. and about half of the registered students are from Florida, Georgia, Texas, and South Carolina.

In 2022, Time4Learning released middle school electives, broadening their offerings for older students. Later that year, they partnered with Squiggle Squad Handwriting to provide Prek-grade 5 students with a handwriting practice program.

Cheryl Dodge replaced John Edelson as president in January 2023.

In May 2025, Time4Learning released a rebranded website with refreshed Parent and Student Dashboards, as well as a new annual discount. Later that year in July, Time4Learning announced a partnership with Subject.com to revamp their entire middle school and high school catalog. These courses, collectively called “Cinema Series,” span across all subjects that Time4Learning offers–mathematics, science, English language arts, history, government, and a variety of electives such as Financial Literacy and Introduction to Engineering.

== Platform ==
Time4Learning provides a subscription-based online curriculum for homeschools and primary schools.
