= Homeschooling in New Zealand =

Homeschooling in New Zealand is legal. The Ministry of Education reports annually on the population, age, ethnicity, and turnover of students being educated at home.

== Statistics ==
The 2017 statistics showed:

"As at 1 July 2017, there were 6,008 home schooled students recorded in the Ministry of Education's Homeschooling database. These students belong to 3,022 families and represent 0.8% of total school enrolments as at 1 July 2017. Out of the 6,008 homeschoolers 67.3% were the aged 12 or under, 68.3% had been home-schooled for less than 5 years, and only 4.2% had been home-schooled for 10 years or more. European/Pākehā students are more likely to be homeschooled than any other ethnic group with 80.2% of all homeschoolers identifying as European/Pākehā compared to 50.1% of the total school population. Only 8.7% of homeschoolers identify as Māori compared to 24.0% of the total school population, 2.6% of homeschoolers identify as Pasifika compared to 9.8% of the total school population, and 2.2% of homeschoolers identify as Asian compared to 11.8% of the total school population. The ethnicity of 2.0% of homeschoolers is unknown."

== Regulations ==
Under New Zealand law, all children aged six or over must be enrolled in a registered school unless they have been issued an exemption by the Ministry of Education (MoE). Application must be made to the MoE for a Certificate of Exemption for each child and a statutory declaration signed and sent to the Ministry every six months. In the initial application, the parent or caregiver "must satisfy the Ministry that [the] child will be taught at least as regularly and as well as they would be in a registered school." Parents or caregivers who homeschool may choose to receive a "home education supervision allowance" from the MoE for each exempted child.

On 18 May 2026, the Education Minister Erica Stanford announced that the final version of the Education and Training (System Reform) Amendment Bill, which had already passed its second reading in the New Zealand Parliament, would incorporate new checks on parents of homeschooling children. Stanford had made these changes following a critical report about homeschooling and child safety at the isolated Gloriavale Christian Community's West Cost commune. In response, the National Council of Home Educators New Zealand (NCHENZ) released a statement expressing disappointment at the lack of consultation. These changes were incorporated into the bill on 26 May without public consultation. Prior to its third reading scheduled for 27 May, Stanford announced that the reading would be delayed so that the homeschooling-related amendments could be withdrawn. According to Radio New Zealand, she had withdrawn these proposals following discussions with the National Party's coalition partner, New Zealand First. Stanford said that the Government would take "extra time" to incorporate changes to homeschooling policy into law. The Government's homeschooling U-turn was welcomed by the NCHENZ's government liaison Cynthia Hancox and homeschoolers, who gathered outside Parliament. In addition, NZ First, ACT, Labour, Green and Māori parties welcomed the Government's withdrawal of the homeschooling provisions.

== Motivations ==
There are a variety of complex reasons why parents choose to educate their children at home, including wanting to customise the education to the individual child and concern or disagreement with the teaching offered by registered schools. Homeschooling is also done for religious reasons and for special needs children (i.e. those who are gifted, problematic or have learning disabilities).

In February 2023, Radio New Zealand (RNZ) reported that a growing number of New Zealand parents were planning to homeschool their children due to a Government COVID-19 mandate requiring children in Year 4 and above to wear facemasks indoors. RNZ reported that the Ministry of Education had received 867 homeschooling applications in November 2021, 800 in December 2021, and 735 in January 2022. The Education Ministry had also approved 2,655 homeschool applications in 2021, declined 78 and was processing 983 applications by February 2023. Of these applications, 900 were from the Auckland Region, 500 from the Canterbury Region, and 400 in Waikato.

== Public opinion ==
As elsewhere in the world, home education is considered something of an alternative lifestyle. Concerns are sometimes raised about the quality of homeschooling because of the apparent ease in obtaining permission and lack of accountability of the teaching that is carried out; a lack of social interaction is also frequently cited as a potential drawback. More research on the academic and social functioning of the home-educated is available internationally.

== See also ==
- Ministry of Education - Home education
- Home Education Foundation NZ
- National Council of Home Educators New Zealand
- Education in New Zealand
- National Home Education Research Institute
