= Albany Free School =

The Free School (formally the Albany Free School)
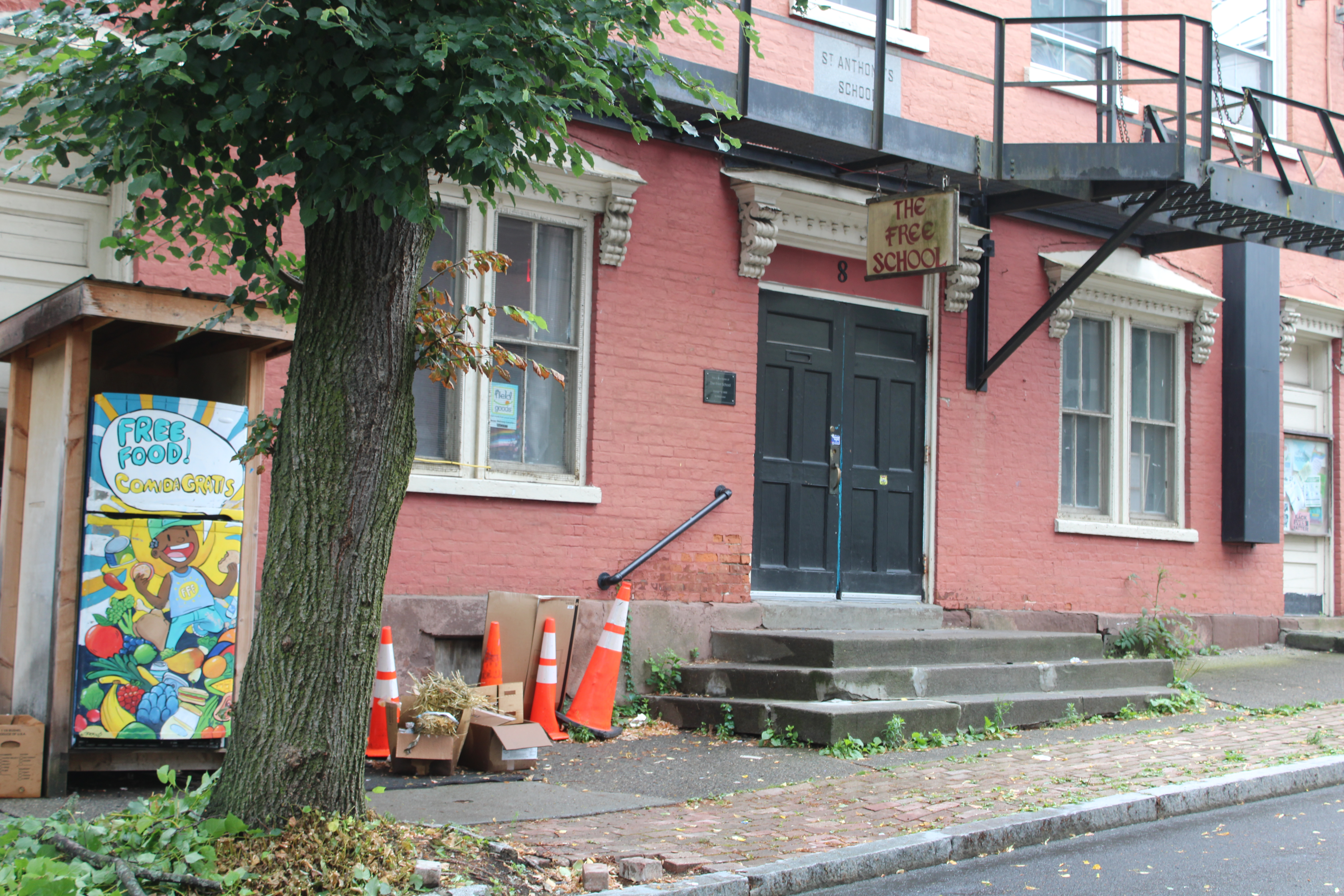
- The front of the Albany Free School building in Albany, NY

Location
- 8 Elm Street; Albany, New York 12202; United States; 42°38′45″N 73°45′27″W

Information
- School type: Private elementary and secondary democratic free school
- Established: 1969
- Founder: Mary Leue
- CEEB code: 330109
- NCES School ID: 00936912
- Faculty: 6 (on FTE basis)
- Grades: Pre-K to 8
- Gender: Coed
- Enrollment: 58 (as of 2006)
- Campus type: Urban
- Affiliation: Nonsectarian
- Website: thealbanyfreeschool.org

The Free School is the oldest independent, inner-city alternative school in the United States. Founded by Mary Leue in 1969 based on the English Summerhill School philosophy, the free school lets students learn at their own pace. It has no grades, tests, or firm schedule: students design their own daily plans for learning. The school is self-governed through a weekly, democratic all-school meeting run by students in Robert's Rules. Students and staff alike receive one equal vote apiece. Unlike Summerhill-style schools, the Free School is a day school that serves predominantly working-class children. Nearly 80 percent of the school is eligible for reduced-price meals in the public schools. About 60 students between the ages of three and fourteen attend, and are staffed by six full-time teachers and a number of volunteers.

The school runs on a shoestring budget as a tradeoff for its financial independence and accessibility to low-income students. Tuition is billed on a sliding scale based on what parents can afford. Revenue from rental properties and fundraising supplements tuition income. The Free School started a high school program in 2006 that later spun off as the Harriet Tubman Democratic High School before closing in 2017. Journalists have likened the school's approach to unschooling and homeschooling, and its work to that of prefigurative politics. The Albany Free School is one of the few schools remaining from the 1960s and 1970s free school movement. It inspired the program of the Brooklyn Free School.

== History ==
The Free School is the oldest independent, inner-city alternative school in the United States. It was founded in 1969 by Mary Leue, who wanted to start a school that was free both by "democratic principles and accessibility to poor children". Leue approached A. S. Neill of Summerhill, the democratic school's progenitor, for advice on how to make a similar school for working-class children, he replied that "she would be mad to try". (Note: Neill had said decades earlier that the model would work for the "proletariat", and Neill himself based Summerhill on Homer Lane's Little Commonwealth, which served young orphans and troubled adolescents.) The school's first pupils withdrew from the public school. Chris Mercogliano came to the school in 1973 and became "its co-director and figurehead". The school is located in a socioeconomically and racially diverse downtown Albany in a building that once housed a parochial school. They purchased a number of buildings in the early 1970s for "next to nothing" in the impoverished neighborhood. The Albany Free School is one of the few free schools to persist from the hundreds once open in the free school movement of the 1960s and 1970s.

Over time, the Albany Free School became a "safety net" for children with special needs who were not fully accommodated in the public schools. The school's waiting list grew accordingly, and its program was also impacted by the difficult home situations that these students would often bring to school. The school's "unofficial adage" is, "Never a dull moment, always a dull roar."

== Program ==
The school's philosophy is that students learn best at their own pace. The original curriculum was a cross between "instruction and home life". The Free School has no firm schedule and does not grade students. The day begins between 8 and 9am, and students are asked what they want to do each day. Students are grouped by age and present their own plan for each day. They pursue various projects including writing, filmmaking, art, and studying language or history. The school also conducts daily structured math and ELA classes for all students. Classes tend to have five to seven students per teacher and the school's teacher–student relationships are close. Teachers report a relative ease in holding students accountable to their stated plans. In 2006, the school had ten teachers, four interns, and a number of parent volunteers for 58 students between the ages of three and fourteen (pre-K to eighth grade). The school has a "Living and Learning" program between 10 a.m. and noon, followed by lunch, which the students make themselves as part of the program. The school ends at 3 p.m.

The Free School self-governs through a weekly "all-school meeting" where students and teachers each receive single votes of equal weight in deciding school policy. Teachers recommend that children resolve their disputes themselves or through small group mediations. If a conflict is irreconcilable, any member of the community can call a school-wide meeting. The group chooses three students to run the meeting in Robert's Rules. Adults facilitate more than lead, and rarely intervene in the meetings, which are intended to teach "mediation and compromise". The school prioritizes self-expression, "honesty, and emotions". One teacher explained the "free" in "free school" to represent the freedom to be oneself without coercion, which comes with the responsibility to listen to others and respect their feelings voices. In the late 2000s, the school expelled a student for the first time by vote at the community meeting.

The school privileges its financial independence and accessibility over sufficient budgeting, a result of Leue's governance choices. The Free School does not receive government funding and instead subsists on student tuition and supplemental income from rental properties and "extensive fundraising". Student tuition is billed on a sliding scale: parents give what they can afford. In 2012, about 80 percent of the school's families were eligible for free or reduced-price public school meals, and Free School parents paid an average monthly tuition of US$160 (substantially below the US$215 cost per child). In 2012, one half the school's students lived in Albany's inner-city South End (mostly black and Latino, with a burgeoning immigrant population), one fourth lived in uptown neighborhoods, and one fourth lived in the suburbs. Leue initially struggled to recruit children of upwardly mobile families, who thought the school would limit their children's chances to join a suitable income bracket. She found that low-income, black families were the most skeptical about the school's usefulness. The school also provides inexpensive (or free) preschool and daycare for young children, operates a car collective (wherein a dozen people share a minivan), and provides low-interest loans through a community credit system.

The school operates on a shoestring budget of US$100,000, or US$150,000 when including the kitchen program. The Free School intentionally foregoes government funding to avoid external control and needless bureaucracy. A volunteer staff performs the school's administrative duties, and as of 2012, six teachers are employed full-time at forty-hour weeks for a US$11,000 yearly stipend. Many take second jobs. Their school's website notes that it has become harder to keep teachers, who are qualified for salaries at least three times this amount plus fringe benefits at public schools. In 2012, co-director Chris Mercogliano, who arrived in 1973, continued to receive the same pay as a new teacher. Teachers report high interest in their work and less interest in the low pay. Younger teachers have expressed more of an interest in racial and social justice, and have tried to increase the school's diversity. Within the school community, some have "half-jokingly" expressed a mix of philosophies between the school's "young anarchists and ... old liberals".

=== High school program ===
The Free School began a high school program in late 2006. It later became the separate Harriet Tubman Democratic High School, and was accredited by the Department of Education. In 2011, the school enrolled 17 students, and employed one full-time teacher, though part-time workers, volunteers, interns, and graduate students kept the ratio of one staff to five students. The school offered both interest-based and "traditional" classes: the former lets students play musical instruments and teach music theory, while the latter prepares students for the state Regents exams. None of the traditional classes enrolled more than 11 students. Students were not turned away based on inability to pay tuition, and 80 percent of the school received tuition aid. As such, the school included students from the city as well as the suburbs. The pupils also participated in staff hiring and school maintenance chores. The director said that the school is best suited for independent students. The high school program closed in 2017 and sold its building the following year.

Free School graduates apply to college with essays and interviews rather than standardized test scores. Tubman High School graduates have attended Clarkson University and Hudson Valley Community College. Albany Free School alumni have continued into occupations including development director at an alternative education organization, and an undersecretary for the Governor of New York.

== Reception ==
Matthew Appleton wrote that the day school's existence proved that the Summerhill method could work in non-boarding school environments, and Ron Miller noted the Free School as an "anomaly" and model for American free schools, which tend to serve upper-middle class children. The Free School inspired the program of the Brooklyn Free School.

In contemplating the role of democratic schools in addressing race-based inequities, Astra Taylor saw the Free School "as a microcosm of an American society that had failed to come into existence". She thought that the school sounded "like unschooling, but in a group setting", where children are free to cross age lines, learn from older idealists, and manage their own affairs. Children are trusted to "learn responsibility, problem solving, and self-governance in the process". Taylor added that the practical needs of tending the chicken coop and vegetables turned "necessity into virtue" as lack of money became "self-reliance and simple living". She compared the school's work to Rebecca Solnit's prefigurative politics: one small group models a different way to pursue a principle, such that the group can live by its ideals while affecting a change they seek.

In comparison to The Free School, the City School District of Albany felt that it was better prepared to fit the needs of all students by offering more social services and learning opportunities, such as an elementary school "dual language enrichment program" and the International Baccalaureate. In contrast, a Free School teacher said that the school's graduates were better able to empathize and emotionally interact, and thus were better equipped to address the fear and mistrust of authority that leads to "laws, judges, courts, prisons".

The Times Union reported the Tubman High School as an "educational island ... outside the public, charter, and private school sphere" that served as a "refuge" for students who disliked traditional public schools. The newspaper wrote that the school, "perhaps the most unique educational experience in the region", was closer to homeschooling than traditional schooling, like a college dorm where small roundtable discussions prevailed.
