= Kilquhanity School =

Free school in the United Kingdom

Coordinates: 55.013°N 3.928°W

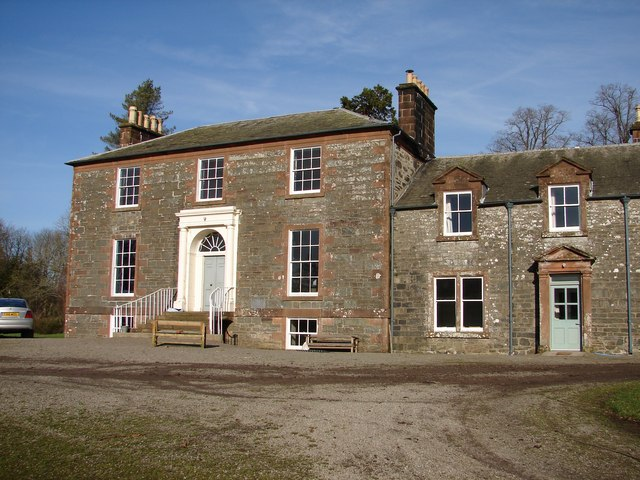
Kilquhanity House

Kilquhanity School was one of several free schools to have been established in the United Kingdom in the twentieth century. Others include Sands School in Devon, Summerhill in Suffolk, Sherwood School in Epsom and Kirkdale School in London.

The school was founded by John Aitkenhead (1910-1998) and his wife Morag in 1940. It was closed in 1997. It was located in a classical mansion house designed by the architect Walter Newall near the town of Kirkpatrick Durham in the historical county of Kirkcudbrightshire in Galloway. The school was reopened under head teacher and former pupil Andrew Pyle, with the support of a Japanese educational organisation Kinokuni Children's Village Schools (headed by Shinichiro Hori) which now owns the premises. The first intake of 12 pupils was expected in 2013. A previous attempt to reopen in 2009 failed to attract a financially viable number of pupils.

The school was visited in 1941 by the refugee Polish Jewish artist Jankel Adler who had been evacuated to Glasgow. The poet W S Graham, who had earlier helped him translate an article on Paul Klee in Glasgow was working here at the time. He spent New Year 1942 here, Christopher Murray Grieve (Hugh MacDiarmid) whose son Michael was a pupil here, was also present.

== Philosophy ==
The philosophy of Kilquhanity was heavily influenced by the writing and ideas of A. S. Neill, who founded Summerhill School, where Aitkenhead had worked; essentially that children learn best with freedom from coercion ("free-range").

== See also ==
- Anarchist free school
- Democratic school
- Collaborative learning
