= John Aitkenhead =

John Marchbanks Aitkenhead (21 May 1910 – 26 July 1998) was a Scottish teacher and co-founder with his wife Morag McKinnon Aitkenhead of Kilquhanity School.

Born in Glasgow, Aitkenhead attended Eglinton School and Ardrossan Academy before completing degrees in English and Education at the University of Glasgow. He worked as a secondary school teacher in Argyll, Glasgow and Ayrshire. After visiting A. S. Neill's Summerhill School, but there being no vacancy on the staff, he decided to found his own free school in Scotland.

Kilquhanity School, near Castle Douglas, Kirkcudbrightshire, Scotland, opened in 1940, as a boarding and day school. With some difficulty, Aitkenhead gained recognition as a conscientious objector, enabling him to continue the work. The school operated continuously until closing in 1995.
