= Brooklyn Free School =

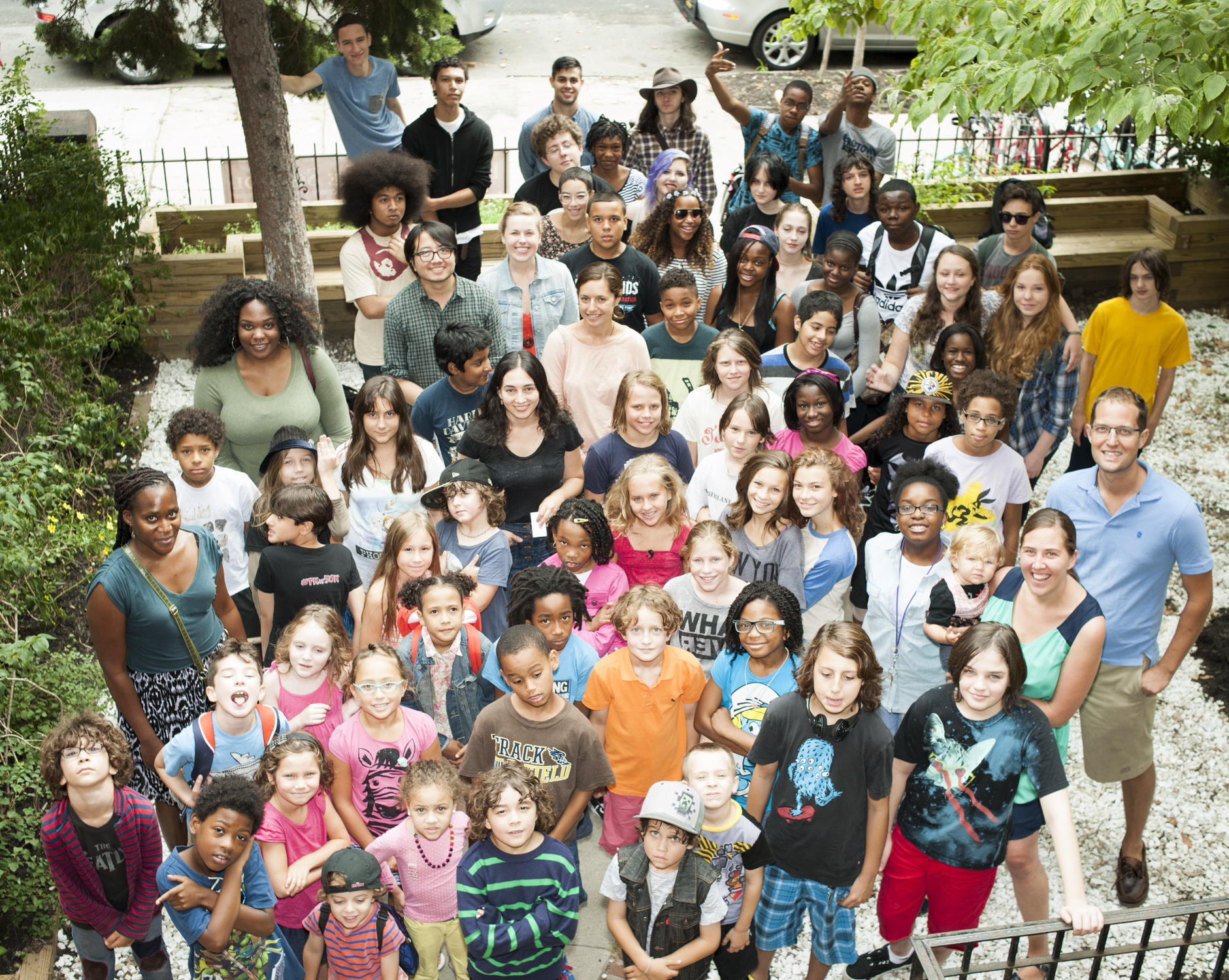
- First day of school, 2014

Location
- Brooklyn, New York; United States
- 40°41′13.5″N 73°58′4.9″W

Information
- School type: Private ungraded elementary and secondary democratic free school
- Motto: “Where children are free to be themselves”
- Established: 2004
- Founder: Alan Berger
- NCES School ID: A0701595
- Director: Noleca Radway
- Faculty: 8 (2014)
- Grades: Ungraded (ages 4 to 18)
- Enrollment: 80 (2015)
- Campus type: Urban
- Affiliation: Nonsectarian
- Website: brooklynfreeschool.org

The Brooklyn Free School is a private, ungraded, democratic free school in Brooklyn, founded in 2004. Students range in age from 4 to 18 years old. The school follows the noncoercive philosophy of the 1960s/70s free school movement schools, which encourages self-directed learning and protects child freedom of activity. There are no grades, no tests, no homework, and classes are non-compulsory. In 2015, the school enrolls 80 students and has about 24 graduates.

The school was the first free school in New York City since 1975. It started in a rented portion of a Park Slope Methodist church, and then moved to a brownstone in Fort Greene, and then was living in the Brooklyn Public Library, And shortly after moved to a place called "Major Owens Center" and then moved to Restoration Plaza, on Fulton Street. Students participate in the design of classes and in the school's governance, which is done at a weekly Democratic Meeting. Staff and students all have equal votes. The school is funded through sliding-scale tuition, grants, and donations. In 2012, Lucas Kavner of The Huffington Post called the Brooklyn Free School "arguably New York's most radical center of learning".

== History ==
The Brooklyn Free School was founded in 2004 in Park Slope, Brooklyn, and began its first academic session later that year. Its director, Alan Berger, had been an assistant principal at a Manhattan high school before he left to found the alternative school. He had read about a free school in Woodstock, New York, and was "grabbed ... to the core". Berger published his idea for the school in the October 2003 issue of the Park Slope Food Co-op newsletter. About 170 people showed interest, and a group held biweekly planning sessions until the school opened in the 16th Street Brooklyn First Free Methodist Church's bottom two floors in 2004. The original class was thirty students with three teachers. It was the first free school in New York City since the Park Slope Fifteenth Street School closed in 1975. By November 2012, the school had moved to a four-floor brownstone in Fort Greene. The school had 42 pupils by November 2006, 60 by 2012, and 80 by 2015. As of 2015, Lily Mercogliano is the school's director. The school is paused since June 2024, because of finances. The school is currently on hiatus because of financial issues. In September 2024, FreeBrook Academy was reopened, and all student from ages 9 and above were moved, except for many, who moved to a different school.

== Program ==
We're trying to nurture kids to stay themselves ... That's what they need to bring to the world, to live a successful, individually happy life.

— Alan Berger, Brooklyn Free School founder and principal, 2012

The school operates under a "noncoercive" philosophy where students are encouraged to develop their own interests and where all learning is self-directed. As such, Brooklyn Free School has no grades, no tests, and no compulsory classes or homework. Students are free to pursue the activities of their interest, such as reading alone or taking a class. Students are free to leave classes as they please. Classes have included philosophy seminars, cheese-tasting, book discussions, business, astrology, psychology, videography, and Tibet. Some classes are taught by volunteers. By law, students are required to attend for 5.5 hours a day. Principal Alan Berger contends that the school provides an education better adapted for the Internet era, as one more original, enterprising, and adaptive in the face of a changing economy.

The Brooklyn Free School holds a weekly, mandatory Democratic Meeting on Wednesday mornings. The meeting runs the school, and students and teachers alike have equal votes. Students are not required to pay attention. Meeting topics range from disciplinary grievances to admissions to computer use. A meeting chair is chosen at the beginning of the meeting and the floor is opened for propositions. Anyone wishing to discuss a school issue can call schoolwide meetings.

As of 2015, the school enrolls about 80 students, about half of whom are African-American or Latino. The school is divided into upper and lower schools, the former ages 11 to 18 and the latter ages 4 to 11, though they are not physically separated by age. Children apply for admission and visit for a five-day orientation. Students are admitted by unanimous vote of a teacher-parent-student admissions committee. The group first determines whether applicants' parents support their decision to attend and whether the school can provide for the students' needs. The school keeps a waiting list.

The school is funded through tuition, grants, and donations. The majority of students come from middle-class families from Brooklyn. The private school has sliding-scale tuition, and less than half pay full tuition. Founding director Alan Berger said that 20 percent paid full tuition in 2012. In 2015, about a third paid less than $500 in tuition, and another third paid half tuition. The sliding scale's full tuition is set at $22,000.

The school graduated 21 students as of 2012, and 24 as of 2015. Students compile their own transcript and nominate themselves for graduation. Some take standardized state and college entrance tests. The majority of Brooklyn Free School graduates continue to college.

== Reception ==
Lucas Kavner of The Huffington Post wrote in 2012 that the school serves as a model for independent, democratic schools at the forefront of renewed interest in the 1960s/70s free school movement. He added that critics contend that the school's environment does not prepare students for real life, and that students from families that cannot hire tutors will suffer disproportionately. The school inspired the Manhattan Free School (founded in 2008), and, in turn, was inspired by the Albany Free School (founded in 1969). Kavner called the Brooklyn Free School "arguably New York's most radical center of learning".

An article in The New York Times in 2006 wrote that parents hired outside tutors in concern for the school's academic preparation. A third of the original students left within the 2004 academic year, as did the original teachers.
