= Yaacov Hecht =

Israeli educator (born 1958)

- יעקב הכט
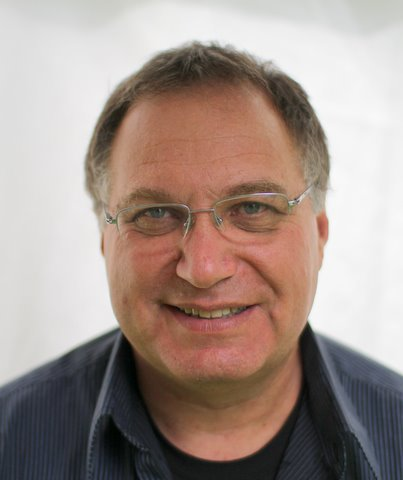
- Hecht in 2011
- Born: 11 January 1958 (age 68); Hadera, Israel
- Occupations: Educator, author, speaker, expert on education and innovation
- Website: website Yaacov hecht

Yaacov Hecht (Hebrew: יעקב הכט; born 1958) is an Israeli educator and proponent of democratic education.

In 1987, he founded the first school in the world called a democratic school. Following that, he helped founding around 30 democratic schools in Israel. In 1993 he convened 'in Hadera the first IDEC- International Democratic Education Conference, an annual conference that continues to connect educators, schools, and organizations. That led to the emergence of hundreds of democratic schools all over the world.

== Career ==
- In 1987, Hecht founded the Democratic School of Hadera, Israel, the first school in the world to call itself democratic. Due to the school's success, Hecht helped to establish a net of democratic schools all over Israel.
- In 1993, he convened the first International Democratic Education Conference (IDEC); an annual conference that continues to connect educators, schools, and organizations.
- In 1996 Hecht founded the Institute for Democratic Education in Israel (IDE), which focused on making a change and implementing innovative perceptions in the Israeli Public School system.
- As part of Yaacov's work in IDE, he launched an academic program (first of its kind in the world) for training of democratic education teachers in Kibbutzim College, the leading academic institute for teachers in Israel.
- Yaacov established a graduate program for school principals in collaboration between IDE and Tel Aviv University.
- Yaacov's work at IDE culminated with the initiation of the "Pioneer" program for the promotion of educational leadership among young educators. The aim of the new program was to focus on schools located in underprivileged neighborhoods, where participants develop innovative projects and implement them, while at the same time, learn how to be school principals, and receive meaningful guidance and support.
- In 2010 Yaacov founded Education Cities - the Art of Collaborations, a social enterprise active in the fourth sector (socially oriented businesses). The organization's concept is that collaborations and the art of generating them are the core of educational innovation - the cornerstone of education systems around the world today. The mission of Education Cities is to develop the art of collaborations in the classroom, in school, municipally and nationwide. Education Cities was chosen by WIRED Magazine as one of the leading trends for 2015 in the area of MOOC learning.
- In January 2017, Education Cities was chosen as one of the 10 leading innovations in the world, by HundrED, the Finnish initiative for the promotion of global educational innovation.
- Yaacov has served as an advisor to 6 Ministers of Education in Israel (including the present minister), as an expert in creating connections and interfacing between the state and alternative education.

== Educational ideas and philosophy ==
=== Democratic Education ===
The Democratic Education is an education that prepares for life in a democratic culture, it is the missing piece in the intricate puzzle which is the democratic state. The democratic education is an educational approach that attempts to address the following key question: How to prepare the student towards life in a democratic society. A question that is supposed to be the driving force of the education system. In the democratic education, the student focuses on exploring and identifying his/her individual and social goals and develops strengths in such way that enables him/her to direct one's life according to these goals. The school assists the student in creating and acquiring the tools that will help him/her achieve one's goals.

=== Democratic Schools ===
Schools that operated with democratic principles have been in existence for the last century (Janusz Korczak's orphanage, Summerhill, and Sudbury school are a few examples) under different titles (alternative, Open, Free Schools, etc.). A democratic school operates as a microcosm of a democratic state and upholds human rights and children's rights. In most democratic schools the following principles are maintained:

- A democratic community – the school is run by democratic institutions. Decision making and their execution is made by the entire school community.
- Choice – Every student chooses what, how, when and where to learn.
- Dialogue-based self-assessment – without tests and grades.
- Age mixing – living and learning in school are in multiage settings.
- Egalitarian and dialogue-based discourse – between the staff and the students.
- Study curricula are taught from the human rights perspective.

=== Education Cities – the art of collaborations ===
According to the Education City concept, the entire city and all its resources transform into one big school. Education Cities has worked since 2010 with dozens of municipal authorities in Israel on implementation of the following principles:

- The city as one big school – an Education City is a learning social network focused on developing and unlocking the potential of the individual and the city through personal, community, and municipal strength and growth areas.
- Local narrative and language – an Education City develops a "narrative", a "language", and a local way of life that are based on the strengths of the area and leverage future directions for development.
- Global Innovation – an Education City serves as a central platform for linking the city with approaches of educational, urban, and technological Innovation, suited for the 21 st century.
- The art of collaboration – in an Education City a dynamic process takes place and, very much like a work of art, serves as an inspiration. During this process, collaborations form and facilitate the generation of unique creations by the city's residents and the organizations active in it. These are not dictated but rather generate spontaneously when people realize the potential in each other. A climate of social, community, and environmental responsibility is developed.

Two of the most significant tools Yaacov has developed in the frame of Education Cities are Classroom 2.0 or the Education Team model and How2MOOC model. The Education Team has only two principle guidelines:

1. The group has a mutual and measurable objective, this way; each group member is responsible for the other's success. The group builds and runs a weekly diagram of the shared results and knows how to refine and improve the work model.
2. Each group member is both a learner and a teacher. The group is committed to uncovering its member's strengths and to utilizing these resources for achieving the group's shared objective.

The group strives to achieve its goal by utilizing its members' talents and nurturing a team spirit and pride. How2MOOC, Education Cities model for MOOC learning has made a positive impact in this area in Israel. It is based on a fusion between the Education Team Model's spirit, the flipped classroom (studying at home and processing the information in class together), and the use of Facebook, WhatsApp and other virtual media tools. The average rate of completion of MOOC courses in the How2MOOC classes is 88%

== The Worldwide aspect ==
- IDEC – the international conference was established in 1993 in the Democratic School of Hadera in Israel. Yaacov Hecht invited 20 educators from around the world to jointly contemplate how to change education in the world – how to change the world. Since then, for the past 24 years, IDEC has been held every year in a different country and continent around the world. Today, representatives from 50 countries participate in the conferences.
- EDUMISSION - a project that invites innovative, groundbreaking schools to prepare a virtual training course about their innovative methods, to learn about each other, and to travel in the world to meet their colleagues and learn about their work face to face.
- Learning expeditions - Yaacov believes that meaningful learning involves 3 essential learning circles:
1. The First Circle – Learning from personal experience
2. The Second Circle – Learning from colleagues and the close environment
3. The Third Circle – Learning from global activity in the field
- Lectures and workshops around the world – Yaacov is often invited to speak in various innovative education events, such as the World Forum for Democracy, which was convened by the Council of Europe; the Think Tank at Harvard University; a courageous alternative education conference in St. Petersburg, Russia; a City Hall innovative conference in Augsburg, Germany; "Education 360" international conference in Brazil and many more cities, schools and privet and public organizations all over the world.

== Personal life ==
Hecht was born and raised in Hadera, Israel, where he lives today. He is married and a father to four children.

== Publications ==
- Democratic Education – The Beginning of a Story, (2005) - in Hebrew
- Democratic Education – A Beginning of a Story, (2011) - in English
- Democratic Education – The Beginning of a Story, (2013) - in Bulgarian
- Democratic Education – A Beginning of a Story, (2015) - in Portuguese
- From a Pyramid Paradigm to a Network Paradigm, from EduShifts:The future of education is now
- An Education City ,(2012), in Education Cities website.
- Education City - a Learning Social Network , (2014) in Education Cities website.
- Education 2.0: from a Pyramid Paradigm to a Network Paradigm (2015), in Education Cities website.
- The Transition between a Teaching Based School to a Learning Based School ,(2018), in Education Cities website.
