= Kirkdale School =

Former school in Sydenham, London, England

Coordinates: 51.4290°N 0.0586°W

Kirkdale School (1964 - 1980s) was a small, independent free school located at 186 Kirkdale, Sydenham, London, England. During the entirety of the school's existence it was run as a parent/teacher co-operative.

Kirkdale is one of several free schools to have been established in the United Kingdom in the twentieth century. Others include (Sands School in Devon, Summerhill in Suffolk and Kilquhanity School in the south-west Scotland). Unlike some free schools, Kirkdale was not established in a rural idyll but within a small plot in London.

== History ==
The School was founded in 1964 by John and Susie Powlesland and a small group of parents that wanted a radical alternative to the "traditional" UK education system.

== Philosophy ==
The philosophy of Kirkdale was heavily influenced by the writing and ideas of A.S. Neill, who founded Summerhill school; essentially that children learn best with freedom from coercion (free-range). All lessons were optional, and pupils were free to choose what to do with their time. The school had frequent school meetings where pupils and staff alike had an equal voice in the decisions that affected their day-to-day lives, including changing school laws. Meetings were also an opportunity for the community to vote on a course of action, for instance, how to address the actions of one person in relation to another that might be unfair or could even amount to bullying. School meetings were normally weekly, every Wednesday, but extraordinary meetings could be called by anyone (and attendance by all was expected) to address an immediate issue.

== Associations ==
Nick Saunders was involved with Kirkdale, and supported a summer camp for the school. A staff member, Romy Fraser, went on to found Neal's Yard Apothecaries with him.
