= Mary Leue =

- Died: October 15, 2023 (aged 103)
- Occupation: Educator
- Known for: Albany Free School, democratic education

Mary M. Leue was a community activist and founder of the Albany Free School. She died in 2023.

== Works ==
- Schools In Their Own Words (2005)
