= Free the Children (book) =

1972 book

- Author: Allen Graubard
- Subject: Free school movement
- Publisher: Pantheon Books
- Publication date: 1972
- Pages: 306

Free the Children: Radical Reform and the Free School Movement is the first book-length account of the free school movement written by Allen Graubard and published by Pantheon Books in 1972.

== Contents ==
The "free" in free schools refers to pedagogy and not tuition. In this distinction, he includes both community-controlled schools run by racial minorities and bohemian "vegetarian geodesic dome schools".

The book contains five chapters and covers a range of topics related to free schools including their philosophies, prominent examples, curricular questions, and contemplation of their usefulness to society.

Graubard begins with the premise that American public education had been inadequate, as of the late 1960s, following the arguments of Charles Silberman and Jonathan Kozol but with fewer accusations. He also criticizes A. S. Neill for his beliefs on authority and nature, and George Dennison for his "ahistorical perspective". Still, Graubard believes that free schools need radical political ideology to survive and protect more than a few children.

Graubard then discusses schools through the perspectives of students and teachers—their breakthroughs and breakdowns. The author contends that a school's format alone—such as its emphasis on friendly cooperation, free expression, student initiative—does not ensure an enriching education. He also explores negative aspects of free schools, such as situations in which children received little adult guidance and in which communal, consensus-based governance became overly dramatic and personally vindictive. Graubard also notes how working-class and black parents did not trust consensus governance, preferring instead the clear rules that middle-class parents found too restrictive.

While schools may exhibit social maladies, Graubard believes that the society and not the school is responsible for solving them. Thus, reform efforts should not be limited to schools and pedagogy. Efforts to "humanize the public schools", he holds, will conflict with "the fundamental social realities—the sickness of American society". Graubard also acknowledges that public schools will be resistant to the changes proposed in free schools.

== Reception ==
Harvard Educational Review's reviewer found Graubard's treatment of community–staff conflict to be sparse, and questioned whether the author appreciated the plight of good-intentioned but limited public school teachers.
