= Kirkdale =

Kirkdale is the name of several places in the United Kingdom:

- Kirkdale, Liverpool, an area of Liverpool, England
  - Liverpool Kirkdale (UK Parliament constituency)
  - Kirkdale railway station
  - Kirkdale TMD, a traction maintenance depot
  - Kirkdale (ward)
- Kirkdale, North Yorkshire, England
- Kirkdale Estate, Galloway, Scotland; featured in the book The Thirty-Nine Steps by John Buchan
- Kirkdale School, Sydenham, London, England
