= Democratic school =

Alternative school applying democratic education

A Democratic School refers to an alternative school that meets the following criteria:

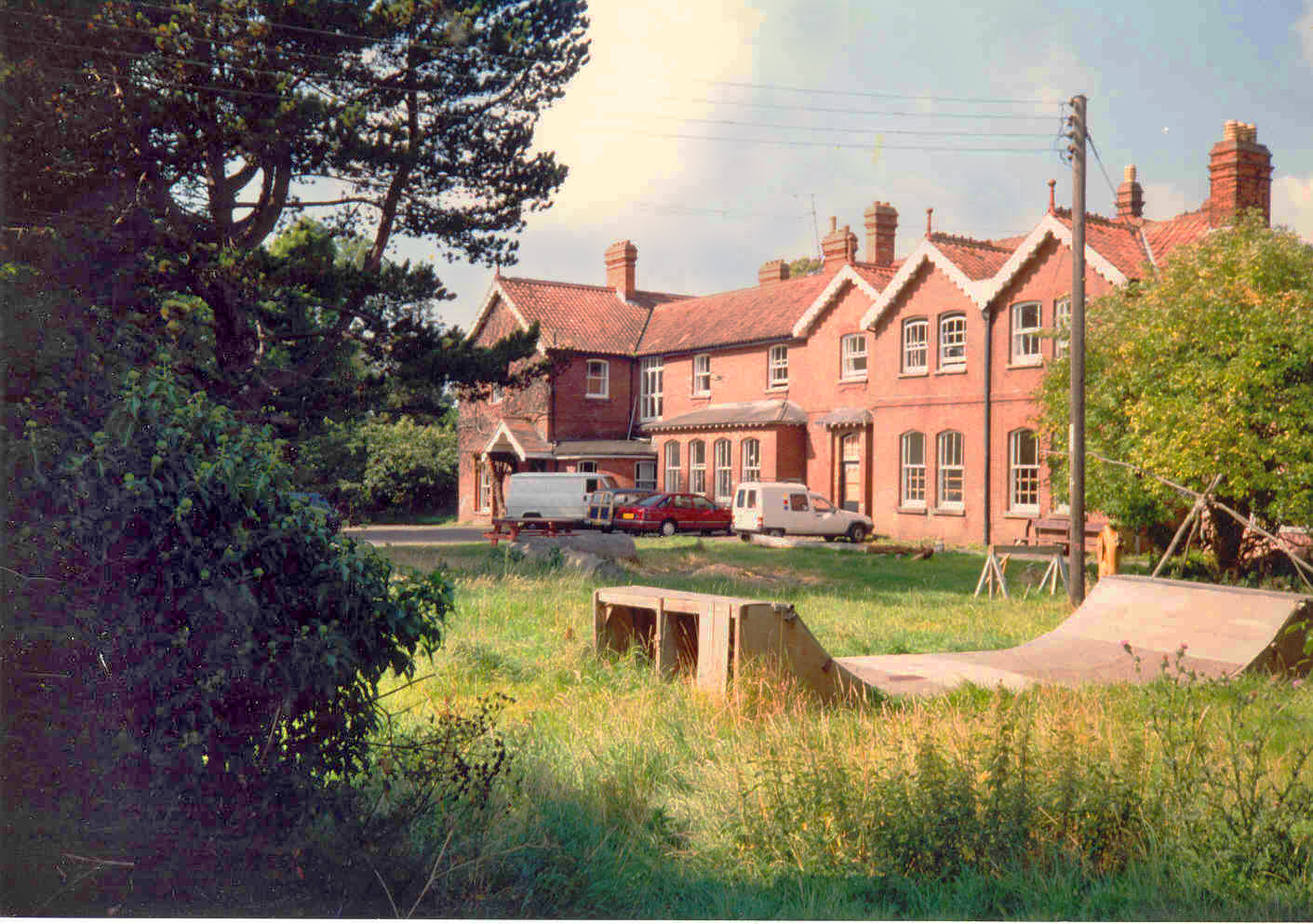
Summerhill – oldest known Democratic School

- Classes are voluntary. Learning is self-directed and takes place without a curriculum.
- The school is run to the greatest possible extent by a direct democracy in which students and teachers have an equal voice in decision-making.
- Students are free to spend their time as they choose, as long as they do not violate the rules made by the school community.

Democratic Schools are places where the concept of democratic education is put into practice and provide an environment for autodidacticism.

The term was first used by the Democratic School of Hadera in 1987.

== Definition ==
There is no common definition of a Democratic School. However, all democratic schools refrain from imposing any obligations or unrequested assessment on the learning process of their students, i.e. foster self-directed learning, and are governed democratically. As a rule, the governing body is the school meeting.

The European umbrella organisation EUDEC names three core characteristics of Democratic Schools:

1. Firm foundations in a values culture of equality and shared responsibility;
2. Collective decision-making where all members of the community, regardless of age or status, have an equal say over significant decisions such as school rules, curricula, projects, the hiring of staff and even budgetary matters;
3. Self-directed discovery; Learners choose what they learn, when, how and with whom they learn it. Learning can happen inside or outside of the classroom, through play as well as conventional study. The key is that the learning is following the students’ intrinsic motivation and pursuing their interests.

=== Typical features ===
- No grades or externally determined assessment;
- Age mix across the whole spectrum of the student body;
- No general or compulsory curriculum;
- Classes voluntary;
- Self-regulation through democratic bodies such as the school meeting and the Dispute Committee; upholding human rights, especially the equality between teachers and students;
- Positive attitude towards the heterogeneity of students;
- Regularly convening school meeting as the school's highest authority;
- Freedom of movement on the entire school grounds;
- Enrollment of 15 to 150 students, in exceptional cases more;
- Play regarded as positive in all age groups;

== School meeting ==
Most democratic schools have weekly school meetings open to all children and adults; some schools have no regular schedule of school meetings but call them whenever there is a need.

All kinds of matters concerning the school are decided together – from the hiring of new staff to the introduction or abolition of rules, and from finances to what will happen during the school day. Everyone, regardless of their age, has an equal vote. The meeting is usually chaired by a student; attendance is usually voluntary.

The school meeting is the highest decision-making body in the school.

Some democratic schools have founders or principals who reserve the right to have the final say on certain matters. Also, not every school meeting may decide on financial issues or safety rules.

Whereas in most schools, especially Sudbury Schools, decisions require a simple majority of those present, in some schools a qualified majority is required. Other schools such as Sociocratic Schools and some Agile Learning Centres strive to achieve consent.

In the school meeting, a student's vote counts as much as a teacher's.

The underlying principle of a school meeting is the idea that "those who are affected by the decision make the decision". Thus, parents at Sudbury Valley School have a say in deciding on school fees. However, parents have no vote on matters concerning school life.

Larger schools and Sudbury Schools often delegate the powers of the school meeting to committees, i.e. workgroups set up by the school meeting.

== Classes ==
Classes at democratic schools are voluntary. At Sudbury Valley School, even attendance on the school premises is voluntary.

Preparation for diplomas varies greatly from country to country. Summerhill and the Freie Demokratische Schule Kapriole in Freiburg (Germany) help their students prepare for nationally recognised qualifications so that the path to apprenticeship or university is open to them.

Sudbury schools have no curriculum at all. Classes play a smaller role here than in other schools. There is no subject that is considered so important that it is offered as standard. Courses are only set up either on the initiative of students or teachers who think someone might be interested in the subject.

In other Democratic Schools, most academic learning is not student-initiated, i.e. the school offers various courses on traditional school subjects in which students can, but do not have to, participate.

Usually, teachers (and less often students) offer other courses or projects on topics that interest them. This can be basically any topic.

Free play and informal learning play an important role in all schools.

When it comes to everyday school life and how freedom to learn is practiced, there are clear differences between the various schools.

== History ==
Since the emergence of democratic state systems there have been schools and children's republics experimenting with student democracy. Among the better-known cases are Léonard Bourdon's boarding school for war orphans Société des jeunes Français (1791-1795), Heinrich Stephani's student jurisdiction (Schülergerichtsbarkeit) in the German town of Gunzenhausen (1826-1834), Leo Tolstoy's peasant children's school in Yasnaya Polyana (1859-1862) south of Moscow and the George Junior Republic (1895-?) in the State of New York. The oldest Democratic school still in existence is the boarding school Summerhill, located in Leiston (Suffolk, England). Summerhill was founded in Germany in 1921 by the Scottish educationalist A. S. Neill, then moved to England, and still exists today.

Summerhill strongly influenced the Sudbury Valley School (since 1968), numerous alternative schools throughout the world and the Democratic School of Hadera (since 1987), so that the vast majority of democratic schools existing today can be directly or indirectly traced back to Summerhill.

Independent of Summerhill, Kees Boeke developed his Consensus Democratic School Werkplaats Kindergemeenschap in Bilthoven, the Netherlands, in 1929, leading to the emergence of Sociocracy and Sociocratic Schools, and Janusz Korczak opened the grassroots democratic Warsaw orphanage Dom Sierot (1911-1942), where children could also attend school classes.

The Sudbury Valley School was founded in 1968 by Daniel and Hanna Greenberg, among others. Since then, at least 40 schools have been founded on the basis of the Sudbury Valley School concept, mostly in the United States. Daniel Greenberg's numerous publications about his school have reached a relatively wide audience. As a result, Sudbury schools represent the most widespread Democratic School model.

In the Western world, the 1968 generation founded numerous alternative schools with elements of direct democracy. In the United States, whose laws make it easier to establish alternative schools, it is estimated that hundreds of schools were founded during the 1970s and 1980s. At the same time, the anti-authoritarian movement in Germany and the progressive educational movement Éducation Nouvelle in France were discussing Neill's ideas. Subsequently, during the reform period under François Mitterrand, two democratic state schools, the Lycée experimental de Saint-Nazaire and the Lycée autogéré de Paris, were founded in 1982 and still exist today. The first official alternative school in Germany was the Demokratische Freie Schule Frankfurt. It was founded in 1975, existed illegally until 1986 and was subsequently legalised by the new red-green government of Hesse.

As early as 1972, students of a Berlin school for second-chance education occupied their school in protest against poor school building and learning conditions. After two evictions by the police and the strikes of teachers showing solidarity, most of the students and a quarter of the teachers were dismissed. Subsequently, some of the dismissed teachers and students founded the Schule für Erwachsenenbildung (School for Adult Education). In the beginning, the school organised itself with an equal delegate system of the two status groups, students and teachers. Later, a school meeting was appointed as the governing body, in which every student and every teacher has a vote. Since the foundation of the school, there has been no compulsory attendance.

In 1987 Yaacov Hecht founded the Democratic School of Hadera. It was the first Democratic School to use the term Democratic School. In 1993 the first International Democratic Education Conference (IDEC) took place here. Since then, the IDEC has been held annually at different Democratic Schools and has contributed significantly to not only the democratisation of alternative education schools, but also the founding of new Democratic Schools. Today, there are at least 200 Democratic Schools worldwide.

Most of these can be found in the United States, Japan, France, Germany and Israel. Relative to its population size, the Netherlands are also significant with 19 schools (as of 2019). Others are in Australia, Belgium, Brazil, Bulgaria, Canada, Costa Rica, the Czech Republic, Denmark, Finland, Ireland, Japan, New Zealand, Peru, Poland, Puerto Rico, Romania, Slovakia, South Africa, South Korea, Switzerland, Taiwan, Thailand, Ukraine and the UK.

By 1981, the Schule für Erwachsenenbildung (School for Adult Education) had grown to an enrollment of approx. 800, making it most likely the largest democratic school of all time. However, the school has shrunk to about 200 students (as of 2016).

The International Democratic Education Conference (IDEC) has been held annually since 1993. The European Democratic Education Community (EUDEC) was founded in 2008. In Israel, there is an Institute for Democratic Education and the company Education Cities. Both emerged from the environment of the Democratic School of Hadera and have committed themselves to support the democratisation and innovation of education, educational processes and schools. The first Democratic State Schools were probably the Lycée experimental de Saint-Nazaire and the Lycée autogéré de Paris (1982 until today). In the 1990s, Democratic State Schools also emerged in Israel.

== Concepts ==
All democratic schools are based on a fundamental respect for children. However, there are clear differences between the various schools in the concrete design of freedom of learning and democratic decision-making structures as well as in everyday school life.

=== Summerhill ===
Summerhill is the most famous, first and oldest (founded in 1921) democratic school. Summerhill's fame significantly influenced the alternative school movement and most democratic schools in their conception.

Summerhill is a boarding school. Almost all rules are made jointly by teachers, “the houseparents” (boarding tutors) and students, classes are optional, and students are allowed a great deal of self-determination.

The headmaster and founder of the school, A. S. Neill saw many of the problems of children and society as being caused by the suppression of sexuality. The discussion of sexuality was one of the special features of Summerhill, along with the use of paradoxical sanctions, i.e. the rewarding of serious offences. Coeducation was also the norm from the beginning of the school and the practices of swearing, bathing naked on the school grounds were not unusual in Neill's time.

Zoë Readhead, the current headteacher and Neill's daughter, noted in 2014, alluding to the fact that Summerhill's challenges have changed: “Summerhill often now finds itself in a disciplinarian role because many children today don't have boundaries set in their homes.” In the past, she said, it was often about teaching scared children to trust, but now it's more about getting children to respect the rules of the community.

=== Sudbury Valley School ===
Founded in 1968, the Sudbury Valley School in Framingham (Massachusetts, United States) is influenced by Summerhill but has a more radical concept of freedom to learn. Classes and other forms of formal instruction are only offered when students explicitly ask for them. In this sense teachers take a more passive role than in other democratic schools.

There are currently more than 40 Sudbury schools, most of which are in the United States.

=== Sociocratic Schools ===
Most Sociocratic Schools are based in the Netherlands and refer to Gerard Endenburg's Sociocratic Method.

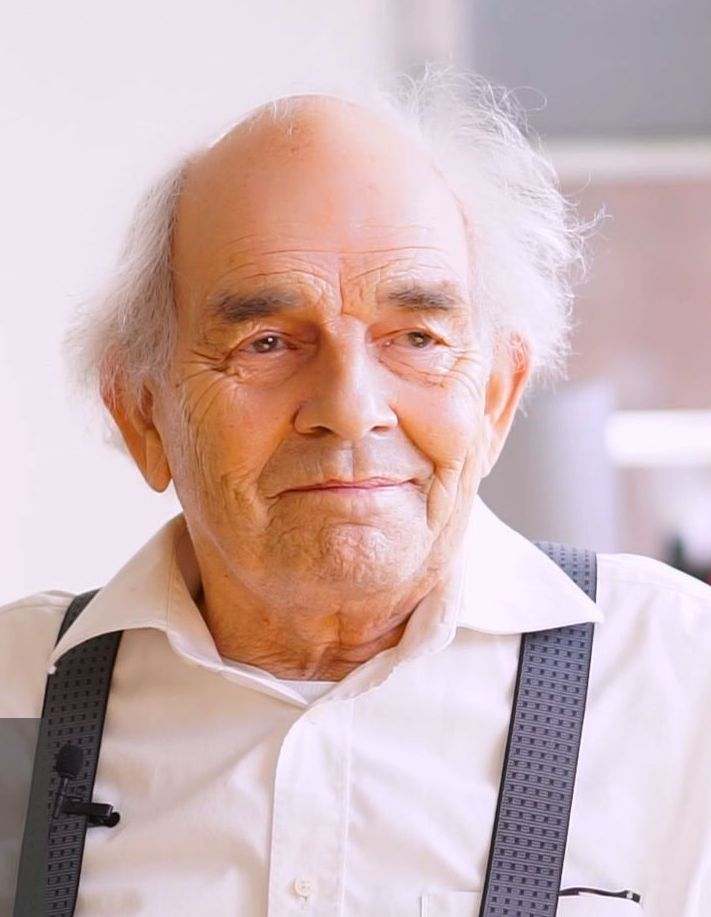
Gerard Endenburg - creator of sociocracy

Endenburg also developed his method through his experiences at the consensus-oriented Quaker school Werkplaats Kindergemeenschap. Decisions in sociocracy are made by consent, a weak form of consensus where decisions are reached by accepting proposals once nobody has a justified "serious objection". Small schools have only one decision-making circle, while larger schools organise themselves in learning communities (similar to a school class). The individual learning communities are organised in circles and are linked to the Students' Circle, i.e. one or two students/teachers sit in both circles and transmit information and decisions. The Students' Circle in turn is linked to the School Circle (the highest body), as are the Teachers' Circle, the Parents' Circle and the Supporters' Circle, which in turn is the higher-level circle of some working groups. All delegates are bound by the decisions of their respective circle.

Learning is basically self-directed. However, more importance is attached to formal learning than in Sudbury schools.

Schools that describe themselves as sociocratically organised are not necessarily democratic schools, but may have a sociocratic organisation of the teaching staff and possibly the parents or the support association, but without (relevant) student participation.

=== Other schools ===
There are also other concepts that fulfill the criteria of democratic schools but do not use this term to describe themselves. These include Agile Learning Centres, the state schools Lycée Experimental de Saint-Nazaire and Lycée autogéré de Paris in France, the Schule für Erwachsenenbildung (School for Adult Education) in Berlin, Methodos e.V. (students preparing themselves for the final exams over a period of 2 to 3 years) in Freiburg (Germany) as well as some anarchist schools, such as Paideia school in Merida (Spain) and schools occupied by students during periods of intense protests (for example in Greece in 1991).

== Graduates ==
=== Research results ===
Studies on the graduates of Summerhill, Sudbury Valley School and The Circle School have concluded that a student of a democratic school tends to come from a middle-class, academic family background. They have either attended the democratic school since the beginning of their school career, because their parents believed in the school concept, or they have chosen the democratic school as an option (or sometimes the last resort) for dealing with issues that arose in previous schools.

Three surveys at Sudbury Valley School and one at Summerhill found that former students see a positive relationship between the democratic school and the development of high self-esteem, the ability to overcome problems and the development of a positive relationship towards learning. In the studies of Sudbury graduates, this relationship was at least significant.

Gray and Chanoff, in their survey of Sudbury graduates, as well as Bernstein in his survey of Summerhill graduates, came to the conclusion that the graduates see no problem for themselves in dealing with authority and rate themselves better than their environment in this respect.

In retrospect, according to a 1985 survey (85% of all alumni were interviewed), Sudbury alumni are very glad (81%) or glad (16%) to have attended the Sudbury Valley School. No alumni surveyed were dissatisfied.

The graduates of Emmanuel Bernstein's 1968 Summerhill study were generally very positive about Summerhill. Bernstein's two most frequent criticisms were the weak academic support and the insufficient(ly) (enthusiastic) teachers. Margit Zellinger (1996) confirms this in her study of Summerhill graduates.

Both points of criticism were presumably also mentioned based on Bernstein's 1968 study in Summerhill and the 1999 Inspector's Report. According to the Inspector's Reports at least the weak academic support is now a thing of the past.

Among the positive aspects of Summerhill according to alumni, the following were mentioned in a 1968 survey (sorted from frequent to less frequent):

- fostering a healthy relationship with sex and the opposite sex;
- the opportunity to develop a healthy self-confidence and a normal way of dealing with authority;
- a space where children could develop naturally and explore their interests and abilities;
- children could act out their play instinct and engage in academic learning at a time they felt appropriate without being coerced;
- Summerhill was a help in understanding one's own children better and in bringing them up in a healthy way

Asked whether they were satisfied with their current life, 15% of Sudbury graduates in the Pursuit of Happiness study answered "unsatisfied", with the majority expecting a change for the better, 25% answered “satisfied” and 60% responded “very satisfied”.

In response to the open question in Pursuit of Happiness asking what the alumni liked about their jobs, 55% responded “being able to help others”, which was by far the most frequently mentioned response category. Another 29% saw a spiritual or ethical purpose in their job. Equal numbers cited activism and financial reasons (14% each).

Although family income within the Democratic Circle School alumni group is positively correlated with the graduate's likelihood of attending college, the likelihood of attending university is significantly higher for Circle School graduates in every income group than for the national average. This was the result of a survey conducted by Circle School itself.

The percentage of graduates who attended or had attended college or university varies from 47% at Summerhill in 1999 to over 58% at Sudbury in 1985. The actual number is probably higher as many of the alumni have just finished school or are still attending a school (that was not Summerhill/Sudbury Valley School).

All Sudbury Valley School students surveyed in 1985 felt they had an advantage over their peers in terms of their attitudes towards academic studies. Not a single one said they had problems with the formal structure. A total of 82% of the students said that Sudbury Valley had helped them regarding their university studies. The two most frequently cited reasons were "ease of dealing with authority" and the opinion that Sudbury Valley was closer to university than mainstream schools in terms of self-organised learning.

A study of 12 UK schools by a former school inspector showed that democratic-school students reported higher than average levels of self-esteem and motivation for learning. Another study that surveyed students from a homeschool resource centre and a Democratic School found that, unlike their peers in conventional schools, learners in these environments did not exhibit any significant decline in motivation to learn as they got older.

In its 2013 Ofsted inspection, Sands School in the United Kingdom was judged as 'Good' overall with a number of 'Outstanding' features. No area of the education provision was found to be less than 'good', and all of the statutory regulations (the school 'standards') were met in full. This was the same outcome as the previous inspection in 2010. Ofsted observed that pupils' participation in decision-making processes helped them develop 'exceptional qualities of thoughtfulness and the ability to offer balanced arguments'. Good pupil achievements were found to be a 'consequence of the democratic structures'. Personal development was deemed 'outstanding' because of the exceptional impact of the democratic principles. The inspector was particularly impressed with pupils' behaviour, noting that 'lessons took place in an atmosphere of mutual respect' and that 'visitors were greeted with interest and impeccable manners'.

=== Notable former pupils ===
==== Democratic School of Hadera ====
- Gal Fridman (born 1975), Olympic windsurfing champion
- Sarit Hadad (born 1978), Eurovision Song Contest singer for Israel

==== Sudbury Valley School ====
- Laura Poitras (born 1964), documentary film-maker and Academy Award winner

==== Summerhill ====
- Rebecca De Mornay (born 1959), Hollywood star
- Zoë Readhead (born 1946), headmistress of Summerhill

Werkplaats Kindergemeenschap

- Beatrix of the Netherlands (born 1938), Queen of the Netherlands
- Irene van Oranje-Nassau (born 1939), Princess of the Netherlands
- Margriet von Oranje-Nassau (born 1943), Princess of the Netherlands
- Gerard Endenburg (born 1933), entrepreneur, founder of sociocracy, professor

== Associations and institutions ==
The rapid spread of democratic schools since the 1990s and 2000s has been largely driven by the International Democratic Education Conference (IDEC).

In addition, the following associations and lobby organisations exist:

- IDEC: International yearly conference of democratic schools
- APDEC: IDEC branch in the Asia and Pacific region
- AERO: Association from the United States
- EUDEC: European Association of Democratic Schools

The Kibbutzim College of Education in Tel Aviv in Israel and the Necessary Teacher Training College (DNS) in Denmark train teachers in Self-Determined Learning and for teaching in democratic schools.
