= ERA School =

Secondary school in Melbourne, 1971–1987

Coordinates: 37°46′20″S 145°11′9″E

- Melbourne, Victoria; Australia

Information
- Established: February 1971
- Closed: March 1987
- Forms: 1-2 (1971-1975); 1-6 (1975-1986); 1-4 (1986-1987)

The ERA School was a co-educational secondary school that opened in Melbourne in February 1971. The school was regarded as providing an 'alternative’ education curriculum. Attendance at lessons was not mandatory, and students could select their own study program. The school was loosely based on the Summerhill School in England that was founded by A.S. Neill. ERA was an acronym for 'Education Reform Association'.

Students were able to wear casual clothes; there was no uniform. Students were allocated to “home groups” which were convened by specific teachers. The school was governed by a council, and there were occasional “general meetings” involving staff, students and parents to discuss school matters.

== History ==
- The school opened 1971 in the 'White House', a large weatherboard building next to an oval at Warrandyte, catering initially to forms one and two only.
- The school moved to purpose-built buildings at a new site in Donvale in 1972 surrounded by native bush. At the time, some working orchards were adjacent, and there was no residential housing nearby.
- By 1975, the school offered secondary education for forms one to six. The Era Primary School was also established, co-located with secondary school.
- By 1986, declining student enrolment resulted in forms five and six being discontinued.
- In late March 1987, the school was forced to close for financial reasons.

In 2006, the site is still in use for educational purposes by Carey Baptist Grammar School, but the only remaining evidence of the school is the "Era Court" street name at the location of the school.
