= International Democratic Education Conference =

Annual academic and youth conference

The International Democratic Education Conference (IDEC) is an annual academic and youth conference hosted by a variety of schools and organizations in cities around the world. It is a global gathering of educators, students, parents, and advocates who are interested in democratic education.

== History ==
IDEC was first held in 1993, and has been held in all subsequent years except 2001 (see notes). The length of the conferences has varied between two days for the first event and 15 days in 1997. The purpose of each conference has been decided by the school organising it.

Internal Democratic Education Conference details
Year	Host school	Location	Participating countries
1993	The Democratic School of Hadera	Israel	Austria, Israel, UK, USA
1994	Sands School	England	Austria, Israel, UK
1995	SchülerInnenschule & Werkcollege im WUK	Vienna, Austria	Austria, Germany, Hungary, Israel, Norway, UK, USA
1996	The Democratic School of Hadera	Israel	Australia, Austria, Canada, Denmark, France, Germany, Hungary, Israel, Palestine, Ukraine, UK, USA
1997	Sands School	England	Austria, France, Germany, Israel, Japan, Palestine, Turkey, New Zealand, Ukraine, UK, USA
1998	The Stork Family School	Vinnytsia, Ukraine	Germany, Israel, Japan, New Zealand, Poland, Russia, UK, Ukraine, USA
1999	Summerhill School	Leiston, Suffolk, England	Austria, Belgium, Canada, France, Germany, Greece, Japan, Israel, Netherlands, New Zealand, Palestine, Poland, UK, US
2000	Tokyo Shure	Japan	Australia, China, Germany, Guatemala, Hungary, India, Israel, Japan, Korea, New Zealand, Palestine, the Philippines, Poland, Russia, Thailand, UK, Ukraine, USA
2001	Institute of Democratic Education	Israel	Germany, Israel, Palestine
2002	Tamariki School	Christchurch, New Zealand	Australia, Germany, India, Israel, Japan, Korea, Nepal, UK, USA
2003	Albany Free School, Alternative Education Resource Organization	United States	Australia, Brazil, Canada, China, France, Germany, Guatemala, Hungary, India, Israel, Japan, Nepal, Netherlands, New Zealand, Palestine, Poland, Russia, South Africa, Switzerland, Taiwan, Thailand, UK, Ukraine, USA
2004	SchoolScape	Bhubaneshwar, India	Australia, Belgium, Brazil, Croatia, France, Germany, Hungary, India, Israel, Japan, Korea, Nepal, New Zealand, South Africa, Thailand, UK, USA
2005	K.R.Ä.T.Z.Ä.	Berlin, Germany	Australia, Austria, Belgium, Brazil, Canada, Denmark, Finland, France, Germany, Hungary, India, Israel, Italy, Japan, Korea, Lesotho, Nepal, The Netherlands, New Zealand, Poland, Russia, Serbia, Spain, Switzerland, Thailand, UK, Ukraine, USA.
2006	Australasian Association for Progressive and Alternative Education (AAPAE)	Sydney, Australia	Australia, Burma/Myanmar, Canada, Germany, India, Israel, Japan, Korea, Nepal, New Zealand, Spain, Switzerland, Thailand, UK, USA
2007	Institute for Democratic Education (Politeia), World Education Forum, Mogi das Cruzes	Brazil	Brazil, Canada, France, Germany, Israel, Italy, Japan, Mexico, Portugal, Spain, Ukraine, USA.
2008	SANE	Vancouver, Canada	Australia, Brazil, Canada, Germany, India, Israel, Japan, New Zealand, Palestine, Peru, Russia, South Africa, South Korea, UK, USA
2009	People's Solidarity for Alternative Education, Korean Parents's Association for Alternative Education, Seoul Alternative Learning Community Network	Seoul, South Korea	Canada, Germany, Israel, Japan, Korea, Taiwan and the USA
2010	Institute of Democratic Education	Tel Aviv, Israel	Australia, Austria, Brazil, Germany, Israel, Japan, Korea, Poland, Netherlands, New Zealand, Puerto Rico, Turkey, UK, Ukraine, USA
2011	Sands School	United Kingdom	
2012	Nuestra Escuela	Puerto Rico	TBD
2013	The Patchwork School	Colorado, USA	TBD
2014		Gwangmyeong, Korea	TBD
2015	Ako-ā-Rongo Trust	Nelson, New Zealand	TBD
2016		Mikkeli, Finland	Australia, Brazil, Egypt, Finland, France, Germany, Hong Kong, India, Israel, Japan, Lithuania, Netherlands, Poland, Puerto Rico, South Korea, Sri Lanka, Sweden, Taiwan, USA, UK, South Africa.
2017	Education Cities Organization Institute of Democratic Education	Hadera, Israel	Australia, Austria, Brazil, Bulgaria, Columbia, Estonia, Finland, Germany, Hong Kong, India, Israel, Japan, Myanmar, The Netherlands, New Zealand, Nepal, Norway, Peru, Poland, Puerto Rico, Russia, South Korea, Spain, Turkey, Taiwan, Ukraine, USA, UK.
2018	Institute of Democratic Education	Bangalore, India	India, Indonesia, Brazil, Japan, UK, Israel, South Korea, Ukraine, Nepal, USA + more
2019	Institute of Democratic Education	Kyiv and Vinnytsia, Ukraine	?
2020	Sri Aurobindo Yoga Mandir-Sri Matri Aurobindo Vidyalaya	Kathmandu, Nepal	
2021	Summerhill School	United Kingdom	online
2022	Summerhill School	United Kingdom	
2023	Sri Aurobindo Yoga Mandir	Kathmandu, Nepal	
2024	IDEC 2024 Executive Committee (TDEC)	Taipei and Yilan, Taiwan	Taiwan, South Korea, Japan, New Zealand, Nepal, Malaysia, United States, Indonesia, Finland, Ukraine, Australia, Germany, Israel, India, United Kingdom, Thailand
2025	IDEC@EUDEC 2025	Sint-Joris-Weert, Belgium	

Notes:

- IDEC 2001: The conference was to be held jointly and co-hosted by the Institute of Democratic Education in Israel and the Hope Flowers School in Palestine, but the international situation reduced it to a comparatively small event, attended mainly by Israelis, Palestinians and Germans; for that situation they was decided to call this conference the "Israeli Democratic Education Conference".
- IDEC 2009: The conference was cancelled due to H1N1
- IDEC 2012: For the very first time, the IDEC conference will be held in the Caribbean at Puerto Rico, a Commonwealth (unincorporated territory) of the United States.

== See also ==
- European Democratic Education Conference
- European Democratic Education Community
- Democratic education
- List of democratic schools
