= European Democratic Education Community =

European non-profit organisation

- Abbreviation: EUDEC
- Formation: March 2009
- Type: Nonprofit organisation
- Region served: Europe
- Services: Supporting democratic education throughout Europe.
- Official language: English
- Main organ: Dorianne De Groot (chair), Stella Serger (vice-chair), Katrin Saage (treasurer)
- Website: www.eudec.org

The European Democratic Education Community (EUDEC) is a European non-profit organisation that promotes democratic education as a sensible educational model for all democratic states. EUDEC aims to further democratic education in Europe. Founded in February 2008 as a project of the United Kingdom-based Phoenix Education Trust, the organisation has been an independently registered non-profit NGO in Germany since 2009.

== About EUDEC ==
EUDEC's members are individuals, schools and institutions throughout Europe with decades of experience in democratic education.

The organisation of EUDEC reflects the democratic education philosophy which advocates that school students should play an active role at all levels of the organisation: e.g. as individual members, in conference-planning, the organisation of programmes and on the EUDEC Council itself.

EUDEC facilitates a network of mutually supportive democratic education practitioners and institutions through the exchange of online information about democratic education in theory and practice, publications, conferences, meetings and seminars, school partnerships and exchanges.

Individuals, schools, school start-up groups and organisations may become members of the Community. As of November 2018 the Community represents some 8000 people in 72 groups from 29 countries including over 7,800 school students, 44 schools, 26 start-up groups and 2 organisations including the German National Association of Free Alternative Schools (BFAS) and UK-based Phoenix Education Trust, as well as about 400 individual members.

EUDEC is mentioned in several publications about inclusion in education.

EUDEC seeks collaboration with other European organisations concerned with education such as the Council of Europe, the European Union through its Erasmus Programme, the Swiss Union of Student Organisations (USO) and the Organising Bureau of European School Student Unions (OBESSU). It seeks dialogue and information exchange with national state education systems through these international activities. In 2016, EUDEC participated in the World Forum for Democracy organized by the Council of Europe. In 2018, a EUDEC member school, the Netzwerk Schule (Berlin), participated with 10 state schools from many countries in the Council of Europe Free to Speak, Safe to Learn. Democratic Schools for All project conference held at the European Wergeland Centre in Oslo.

EUDEC also seeks dialogue with state school systems at the national level through its growing number of national chapters such as EUDEC HUNGARY, EUDEC FRANCE and EUDEC GREECE.

In 2008/2009, EUDEC was an official project of the Decade of Education for Sustainable Development of the United Nations. The Community was formed in parallel with the European Democratic Education Conference, which is now a part of the Community's regular activities. The conference, which takes place annually, also includes the EUDEC's annual general assembly of members, in which officers of the community are elected and decisions are made about Community policy. Every two years the Community elects a Council of 7 to 11 members who administer its business between assemblies.

== Democratic Education ==
There are two main pillars of democratic education: self directed/managed learning in a community based on democratic process and human rights with equality and mutual respect between adults and children/young people. Students in democratic schools and universities choose how to spend their time in school, pursue their interests and prepare themselves for their lives and chosen careers. Learning can take place in classrooms, as in conventional schools, but also in many ways outside classrooms as informal learning, such as independent study, internet research, internships, playing games, volunteering, doing projects, visiting museums, travel and discussions with friends and teachers. The best setting for living, learning, or indeed working, is one in which our rights and opinions are respected. Democratic schools have school meetings in which all members of the community have an equal vote, regardless of age or status. Students and teachers sit together as equals to discuss and vote on school rules, curricula, projects, the hiring of staff and budgetary matters.

== EUDEC Events ==
The first EUDEC Conference took place in Leipzig, Germany from 25 July – 3 August 2008. Since 2008, there has been an EUDEC annual general meeting or conference each year. The events are listed below in chronological order:

- 2008 - EUDEC Conference Leipzig, Germany - hosted by the Freie Schule Leipzig
- 2009 - EUDEC Annual General Meeting Cieszyn, Poland
- 2010 - EUDEC Annual General Meeting Roskilde, Denmark - hosted by Det frie Gymnasium and Den Demokratiske Skole
- 2011 - IDEC@EUDEC Conference Devon, England. This conference was a combination of the EUDEC Conference and the 2011 International Democratic Education Conference (IDEC) -
- 2012 - EUDEC Conference Freiburg, Germany - hosted by the Kapriole -
- 2013 - EUDEC Conference, Netherlands -
- 2014 - EUDEC Conference, Copenhagen, Denmark - Hosted by Det Frie Gymnasium -
- 2015 - EUDEC Conference, Warsaw, Poland - Hosted by Fundacji Bullerbyn -
- 2016 - IDEC@EUDEC, Mikkeli, Finland
- 2017 - EUDEC Conference, Paris, France -
- 2018 - EUDEC Conference, Crete, Greece -
- 2019 - EUDEC HUNGARY conference, Budapest March 2019
- 2019 - IDEC@EUDEC Conference, Kiev and Vinnytsia, Ukraine, 1. - 9. August -

== Member schools ==
- Summerhill Great Britain (founded 1921)
- Sands School Great Britain (founded 1987)
- Neue Schule Hamburg Germany (founded 2007)
- Det frie Gymnasium Danmark (founded 1970)

More member schools can be found at .

== See also ==
- European Democratic Education Conference
