= Free school movement =

American education reform movement, 1960s–1970s

The free school movement (Note: Also known as the new schools or alternative schools movement.) was an American education reform movement during the 1960s and early 1970s that sought to change the aims of formal schooling through alternative, independent community schools.

== Origins and influences ==
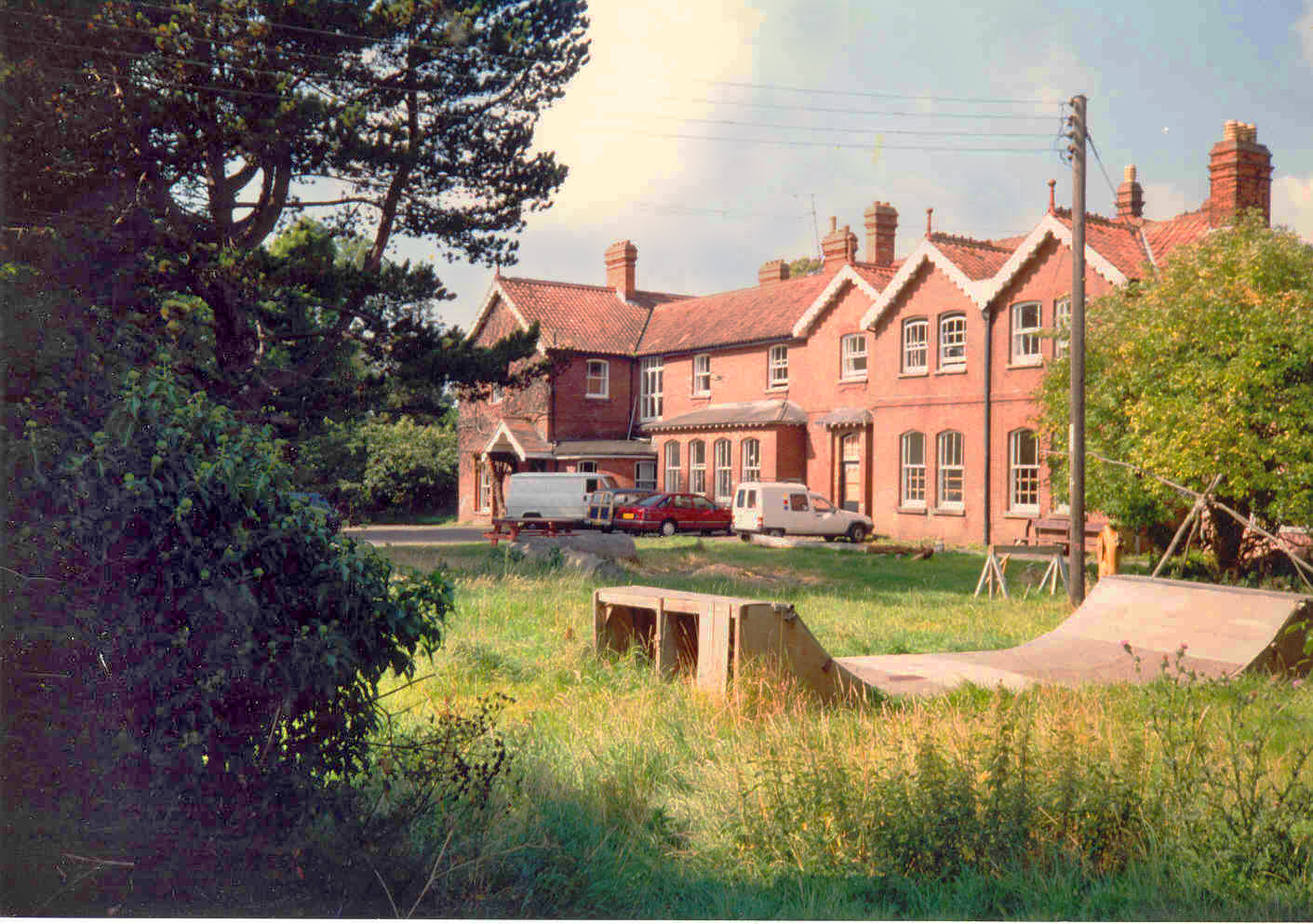
Summerhill, the model for the first American free schools, pictured in 1993

As disenchantment with social institutions spread with the 1960s counterculture, alternative schools sprouted outside the local public school system. Funded by tuition and philanthropic grants, they were created by parents, teachers, and students in opposition to contemporaneous schooling practices across the United States and organized without central organization, usually small and grassroots with alternative curricula. Their philosophical influence stemmed from the counterculture, A. S. Neill and Summerhill, child-centered progressive education of the Progressive Era, the Modern Schools, and Freedom Schools. Influential voices within the movement included Paul Goodman, Edgar Z. Friedenberg, Herb Kohl, Jonathan Kozol, and James Herndon, with titles such as A.S. Neill's 1960 Summerhill, George Dennison's 1969 The Lives of Children, and Jonathan Kozol's 1972 Free Schools. The movement's transference of ideas was tracked through the New Schools Exchange and American Summerhill Society.

The definition and scope of schools self-classified as "free schools" and their associated movement were never clearly delineated, and as such, there was a wide variation between schools. The movement did not subscribe to a single ideology, but its "free schools" tended to fall into the binaries of either utopian cultural withdrawal from external concerns, or built on the legacy of freedom schools with direct political address of social injustices. This dichotomy was also seen in the type of students the school attracted with the former usually white, middle class students and the latter usually poor, black, and inner-city. Some schools practiced participatory democracies for self-governance. The "free schools" movement was also known as the "new schools" or "alternative schools movement". Author Ron Miller defined the free school movement's principles as letting families choose for their children, and letting children learn at their own pace.

== Growth ==
Allen Graubard charted the growth of the free schools from 25 in 1967 to around 600 in 1972, with estimates of 200 created between 1971 and 1972. These schools had an average enrollment of 33 students. Almost all of the first American free schools were based on Summerhill and its associated book. Many of the schools were started in nontraditional locations, including parks, churches, and abandoned buildings.

The movement peaked in 1972 with hundreds of schools opened and public interest in open education.

== Decline and legacy ==
The movement subsided with the rise of 1970s conservatism, particularly due to the Nixon administration's education policies.

The Huffington Post wrote in 2012 that "the movement is revving up again", citing Education Revolution's listing of over 100 free schools in America. The schools are mostly private in America, and generally serve middle and upper-middle-class families. Author Ron Miller credits the rise of standardization with grassroots interest in alternative schools. CBS News reported in 2006 that the remaining free schools, while unknown in number, are "democratic", as the students share in the school's governance.

Education historian Diane Ravitch said in 2004 that these schools function best for students from educated families due to the free schools' emphasis on individual contribution. Victoria Goldman of The Manhattan Family Guide to Private Schools and Selective Public Schools and E. D. Hirsch, Jr. echoed similar thoughts, with Hirsch adding that "it doesn't work for children who haven't had those advantages." Ravitch believed that the free schools' values would conflict with predominant student testing trends.

== See also ==
- Education reform
- Open education

== Bibliography ==
- Cremin, Lawrence (1978). "The Free School Movement: A Perspective". In Deal, Terrence E.; Nolan, Robert R. (eds.). Alternative Schools: Ideologies, Realities, Guidelines. Chicago: Nelson-Hall. pp. 203–210. ISBN 978-0-88229-383-7. OCLC 924992454.
- Graubard, Allen (1972a). Free the Children: Radical Reform and the Free School Movement. New York: Pantheon Books. ISBN 978-0-394-47132-7. OCLC 347882.
- Graubard, Allen (August 1972b). "The Free School Movement". Harvard Educational Review. 42 (3): 351–373. doi:10.17763/haer.42.3.n577v0m481wvl1r2. ISSN 0017-8055. OCLC 5830245883.
- Graubard, Allen (September 1972c). Alternative Education: The Free School Movement in the United States. Stanford: ERIC Clearinghouse on Media and Technology. OCLC 2104918.
- Miller, Ron (2002). Free Schools, Free People: Education and Democracy After the 1960s. Albany: State University of New York Press. ISBN 978-0-7914-5419-0. OCLC 878586179.
- Neumann, Richard (2003). Sixties Legacy: A History of the Public Alternative Schools Movement, 1967–2001. New York: Peter Lang. ISBN 978-0-8204-6354-4. OCLC 878586437.
- Schutz, Aaron (2010). "The Free Schools Movement". Social Class, Social Action, and Education: The Failure of Progressive Democracy. New York: Palgrave Macmillan. pp. 127–157. ISBN 978-0-230-10591-1. OCLC 706055629.
