= Democratic School of Hadera =

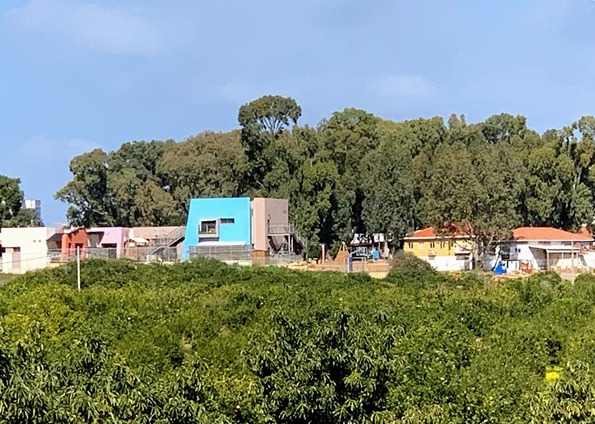

Location
- Hadera; Israel
- Coordinates: 32°25′17.35″N 34°55′21.58″E

Information
- Established: 1987
- Gender: Coeducational
- Age range: 4–18
- Enrolment: 800
- Website: www.democratics.org.il

The Democratic School of Hadera is a Democratic School in Hadera, Israel. It was founded in 1987 by Yaacov Hecht. With around 400 students aged four to eighteen, it is the largest of the twenty-six Israeli democratic schools.

The school is governed by a weekly school parliament in which all students, teachers, parents, and alumni have an equal vote. However, few parents and alumni participate in parliament meetings.

Students are free to decide if they want to attend classes or spend their time on other activities such as music, sports, art, computers, reading, talking, socializing, or doing nothing at all.

In 1993, the first International Democratic Education Conference (IDEC) was held at the Democratic School of Hadera. In the years 1996 and 2017, it was held again at that school.
