= European Democratic Education Conference =

The European Democratic Education Conference (EUDEC) is an annual conference of the European Democratic Education Community, a European network of people involved in democratic education. The first conference was held in Leipzig, Germany, from 25 July – 3 August 2008. The organisation of the 2008 conference was largely independent of the EUDEC Community, as the latter was founded in February 2008 after over a year of conference groundwork. Following the first conference, the dates, locations and content of conferences are determined by the Community.

Both Conference and Community arose from the need of democratic education proponents in Europe for deeper networking and coordination. The conference's location in Europe makes it comparatively easy for people in Europe to participate, because the annual International Democratic Education Conference (IDEC) is held in different locations all over the world and travel costs from Europe are often prohibitive.

The 2009 EUDEC Annual General Meeting was in Cieszyn, Poland.

The 2010 EUDEC Annual General Meeting was in Roskilde, Denmark.

The 2011 IDEC@EUDEC Conference, in the UK was both an IDEC and an EUDEC Conference which ran from 5 to 14 July.

The 2012 EUDEC Annual General Meeting and Conference was held in Freiburg, Germany which ran from 28 July to 5 August.

The 2013 EUDEC Annual General Meeting and Conference was held in Soest, Netherlands between 28 July till 2 August.

The 2014 EUDEC Annual General Meeting and Conference was held in Copenhagen, Denmark between 5 and 8 August.

The 2015 EUDEC Annual General Meeting and Conference was held in Ojrzanów near Warsaw, Poland between 1 and 9 August.

The 2016 IDEC@EUDEC Conference was held in Mikkeli, Finland between 6 and 10 June.

== See also ==
- International Democratic Education Conference
- European Democratic Education Community
