= The Lives of Children =

1969 book by George Dennison

- Author: George Dennison
- Subject: Education
- Published: 1969 (Random House)
- Pages: 308
- OCLC: 29393

The Lives of Children is a book by George Dennison about the First Street School, a small, alternative mini-school on the Lower East Side of New York City. The school had no administrators, four teachers, and 23 students of integrated racial background. The author establishes a philosophy of education and concept for future schools based on his experiences teaching there.
