= Democratic education =

Schooling run as direct democracies

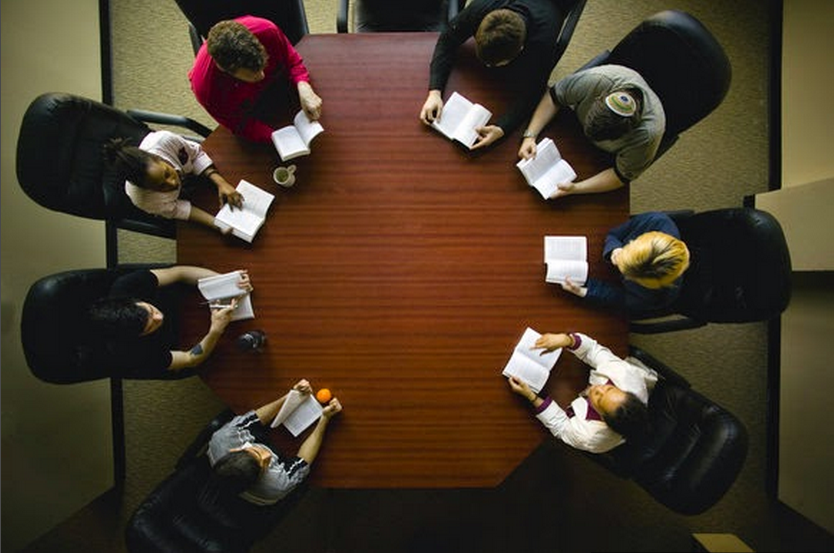
A discussion class at Shimer College, a democratic college in Chicago

Democratic education is a type of formal education organized democratically, allowing students to manage their own learning and participate in the governance of their educational environment. Democratic education is often specifically emancipatory, with students' voices equal to teachers'.

Democratic education must be distinguished from civic education. Although there are overlaps, civic education concerns the study of the theoretical, political, and practical aspects of (democratic) citizenship, as well as its rights and duties. In contrast, democratic education presupposes that the educational setting is organized democratically.

== History ==
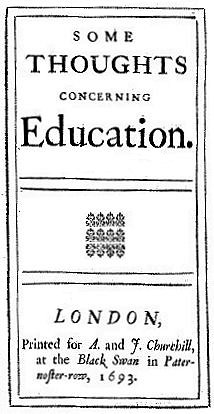
Locke's Thoughts, 1693

The history of democratic education spans from at least the 17th century. While it is associated with many individuals, there has been no central figure, institution, or nation that advocated for democratic education.

=== Theory ===
In 1693, John Locke published Some Thoughts Concerning Education. In describing the teaching of children, he declares,

None of the things they are to learn, should ever be made a burthen to them, or impos'd on them as a task. Whatever is so propos'd, presently becomes irksome; the mind takes an aversion to it, though before it were a thing of delight or indifferency. Let a child but be order'd to whip his top at a certain time every day, whether he has or has not a mind to it; let this be but requir'd of him as a duty, wherein he must spend so many hours morning and afternoon, and see whether he will not soon be weary of any play at this rate.

Jean-Jacques Rousseau's book of advice on education, Émile, was first published in 1762. Émile, the imaginary pupil he uses for illustration, was only to learn what he could appreciate as useful. He was to enjoy his lessons and learn to rely on his own judgment and experience. "The tutor must not lay down precepts, he must let them be discovered", wrote Rousseau, and urged him not to make Émile learn science, but let him discover it. He also said that we should not substitute books for personal experience because this does not teach us to reason; it teaches us to use other people's reasoning; it teaches us to believe a great deal but never to know anything.

John Dewey is considered one of the most influential American educationalists. He argued for progressive education, for an education to prepare for democracy, and founded the University of Chicago laboratory schools to test and evaluate his progressive education ideas in practice.

His views on education were influential in the emerging educational movement; they emphasized the importance of implementing democratic procedures in schools and the crucial role schools play in a democratic culture by educating citizens to maintain a healthy democracy. He tried out some of his ideas at his Chicago laboratory school.

=== Practice ===
The Laboratory School (1896-1903), founded by John Dewey, implemented democratic practices through a highly participatory approach to education, where students were actively involved in planning their learning activities, setting goals, and evaluating their progress. Rather than traditional top-down instruction, teachers served as guides and facilitators, encouraging students to engage in collaborative projects and group decision-making. The school organized learning around practical activities such as cooking, carpentry, and gardening, fostering cooperation and shared responsibility. Regular community meetings included students in school decisions, while project-based learning encouraged students to work together to solve real-world problems. This approach created a miniature democratic community where students learned not just academic subjects, but also developed democratic habits through direct experience with collaborative problem-solving, shared decision-making, and social responsibility.

At least since the existence of democratic states in the modern era, educators, politicians, and activists have experimented with democratic environments for children in orphanages, children's republics, and schools.

==== Children's republics ====
While educational ideas of the past were mostly directed to upper-class children, educationalists such as Léonard Bourdon and William George tried to provide educational opportunities for all, especially the lower classes. They aimed to protect and foster democratic and ethical values.

They organized children and young people in children's homes in a way that they were familiar with from their respective democratic states (France after the French Revolution and the USA). In other words, they applied democratic structures, creating a kind of small republic for children and teenagers. While Bourdon's Societe d'emulation was quickly closed due to the conservative reactionary period, the George Junior Republic still exists today (albeit with a different concept) and started the successful tradition of democratic education in children's republics and Democratic Schools.

Inside their institution, the children of George Junior Republic had almost the same rights as American citizens. They elected two chambers of Congress (the United States House of Representatives and the United States Senate) and could earn money by working on the republic's land. Courts and police-like entities dealt with problems among the "citizens" and could even send them to their own prison.

Hundreds of junior republics were created in the US and other countries based on this model. At one of these offshoots, the Ford Republic, Homer Lane developed an educationally supported and in many ways milder model of the George Junior Republic. Homer Lane later brought this concept to England and influenced A. S. Neill and his Summerhill School.

In 1921, Summerhill was founded as a boarding school and the first school in which students and teachers had an equal vote in nearly all school matters.

In 1912, Janusz Korczak founded Dom Sierot, the Jewish orphanage in Warsaw, which was run on democratic lines. In 1940, Dom Sierot was forced to move to the Warsaw Ghetto and in 1942, Korczak accompanied all his charges to the gas-chambers of the Treblinka extermination camp.

Korczak published many books, had a radio program, where he talked with children and garnered considerable press attention with his partly democratically run orphanage Dom Sierot. With his advocacy for children's rights pointing in the direction of democratic education, he influenced the children's rights movement and the public view of children, parenting and childcare.

==== Alternative Free Schools ====
The definition and scope of schools self-classified as "free schools" and their associated movement were never clearly delineated, resulting in wide variation among schools.

As an anarchist, Leo Tolstoy emphasized the freedom and empowerment of the lower classes through education and the experience of self-organization and freedom at school. The first alternative free school in history was most likely his school for peasant children in Yasnaya Polyana (Russia).

At the beginning of the 20th century, the first wave of the progressive educational movement – influenced in part by earlier educational experiments and political philosophies, e.g., from Jean Jacques Rousseau and Pestalozzi – created a variety of concepts and schools in which students had significantly more autonomy in their education and daily lives than in traditional schools. Some of these schools invited children to take part in the decision-making process inside the school.

The school Werkplaats Kindergemeenschap was founded in 1926 in Bilthoven, the Netherlands, by Kees and Beatrice Boeke. Its concept is based on the Quaker principle of consensus decision-making, meaning that children and teachers have an equal say in most affairs concerning the daily school life. The Werkplaats student Gerard Endenburg further developed the consensus culture and created the model of sociocracy, which was later implemented in so-called sociocratic schools, predominantly in the Netherlands.

Francisco Ferrer founded the Barcelona Modern School based on anarchist values. It served as a role model for at least 100 anarchist free schools worldwide. Most of them were based in Spain, Latin America, and the US. Although many were closed in Spain owing to the defeat of the Spanish anarchists in the Spanish Civil War and in the US for other reasons, some of their students would later help establish alternative schools in the US during the 1960s Free School Movement. Francisco Ferrer influenced the still-existing school Paideia in Mérida (Spain). Paideia is an anarchist school that promotes student freedom inside the school, allows classrooms to decide for themselves what they want to learn, and lets students participate in the rule-making process.

A widespread movement of free schools developed in the 1960s, inspired by A. S. Neill's publications on his Summerhill School, George Dennison's publications on the progressive First Street School, and the general progressive climate of the 1970s. This movement was largely renounced during the conservative period of the 1980s.

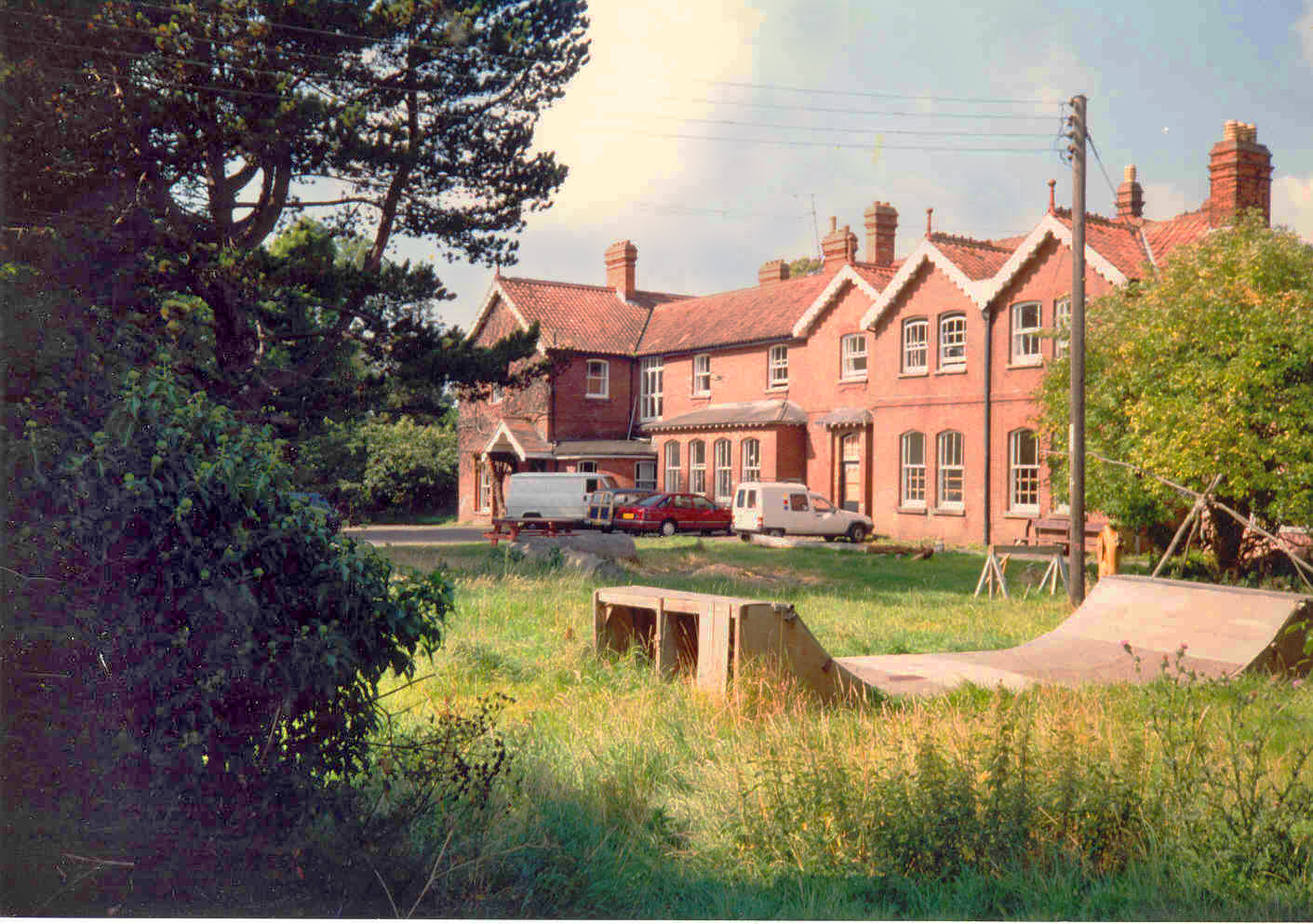
Main building of the Summerhill School

Although most alternative free schools would not describe themselves as Democratic Schools based on the definition of the term, many foster democratic student participation in the learning process and the running of the school. Other influential Democratic Schools are the Sudbury Valley School, with its many spin-off Sudbury Schools, and the Hadera Democratic School, which was the first school to use the term "Democratic School".

==== Democratic School ====
Democratic Schools are a type of alternative free school that are much more delineated. They combine radical freedom of learning with (almost) equal participation of teachers and pupils in all matters of everyday school life.

Learning in a job environment

Agile learning generally refers to the transfer of agile methods of project work (deriving out of the Agile Manifesto 2001), to learning processes. It is mostly used in job context and originates from software development, but is also used in university and school contexts (so-called Agile Learning Center. Organizational hierarchies (unlike knowledge hierarchies) are rather low or non-existent, and decisions within the learning environment are often made collectively using the consent method.

Unschooling

Nowadays, a minority of children in the Western world are homeschooled. Among Western countries, the US most likely has the highest rate of homeschoolers. The researcher Peter Gray estimates that around 10% of so-called "unschoolers", students who are free to choose how and what they want to learn and who organize their lives and learning processes with their family and/or other unschoolers based on democratic principles [....unfinished sentence].

==== Universities and adult education programs ====
In many Western countries, university students have representation in university governance. Their level of influence differs heavily from a more or less equal say, such as at Shimer College, to the election of student representatives in almost all university bodies in most German universities. Other examples include the democratic and self-managed Bachilleratos Populares high schools for youths and adults, which have emerged in connection with occupied factories and social cooperatives in Argentina.

The "Schule für Erwachsenenbildung" in Berlin (Germany) is a democratically run upper secondary school for adults preparing for the German A-levels. Lessons and attendance are optional.

==== Democratic education in state schools ====
For a long time, democratic education was not supported by (democratic) governments. Nevertheless, state schools in most democratic countries exhibit a low level of democratic representation through elected student representatives. Furthermore, there is a variety of projects and experiments focusing on more democratic participation in primary and secondary schools. However, these projects still seem to have an underdog or experimental status within the state school system. Some examples are the class council and two state-run Democratic Schools in France (Lycée Expérimental de Saint-Nazaire and Lycée autogéré de Paris).

==== Other contexts ====
Aside from democratic education in the afore-mentioned contexts, there are a variety of (partly) democratic organizational structures within other types of educational settings, such as prisoner self-organisation, the scout movement, self-organized sports clubs (rather common among trending youth sports like skatboarding, surfing, freeclimbing, parkour, freerunning) and self-organized bands and music groups, nursery schools, Kindergartens and outdoor education programs.

== Defining principles ==
Democratic schools are very diverse, but they can all be defined as following two key principles:

1. Democratic governance: meetings in which all members of the school community can participate
2. Autonomy for the students to manage their own learning process

=== Democratic governance ===
Democratic governance entails the active participation of the entire community, including children, in collective decision-making processes that govern the learning environment. This democratic management can take many forms. While most Democratic Schools and Children's Republics make decisions based on majority vote, Agile Learning Centers, Sociocratic Schools, occupied schools and occupied universities use consensus decision-making. The collective decision making can cover anything from small matters to the appointment or dismissal of staff and the creation or annulment of rules, or to general expenditure and the structure of the day. At some democratic learning environments, all are expected to attend these meetings; at others, they are voluntary.

=== Student autonomy ===
While other forms of alternative pedagogy, such as Freinet and Montessori, leave it up to learners to decide how, when, and with whom they learn, democratic education also places the content in learners' hands. Therefore, in democratic educational environments, attendance at classes and other educational activities is voluntary.

== Teaching principles ==
Teaching principles that are put into practice in various democratic learning environments to guarantee and develop students' autonomy in their learning process include:

- Project-Based Learning: Students learn through an investigation process structured around complex and authentic issues. Students choose a theme, question, or objective to guide the creation of their project until they reach a final output. In this way, they are the protagonists of their own learning process. Projects can be carried out individually or in groups.
- Committees: Teams formed to help in the organization of the school space, in the completion of routine tasks for the health and maintenance of the community. These groups are usually formed during school meetings to meet the needs of the school community.
- Study group: Are formed from themes proposed by students and/or educators. There may be questions or topics that they would like to explore. Each group usually has a facilitator or tutor who guides the study process.
- Self-assessment: The student evaluates their own learning process, based on criteria defined together with the educator/tutor.
- Mentoring: Each student has a mentor who can work with each student individually or in groups. The mentoring sessions address the student's goals and aspirations, as well as issues that focus not only on academic performance but also on relationships with peers, educators, and family.
- Study guide: A document planned by the educator to be used by the student inside or outside the school space. It aims to assist students in autonomous study, thereby favoring understanding of concepts, resolution of situations, reading, and theoretical and practical deepening, among other aspects of the teaching and learning process.
- Unschooling/Self-directed Education: Unschooling is an informal learning approach that advocates learner-chosen activities as a primary means for learning. Unschoolers learn through their natural life experiences, including play, household responsibilities, personal interests and curiosity, internships and work experience, travel, books, elective classes, family, mentors, and social interaction. Self-directed education is education that derives from the self-chosen activities and life experiences of the learner, whether or not those activities were chosen deliberately for education.

Compared to traditional education, progressive education prioritizes exploratory learning over adherence to instructions. However, frontal instruction remains a commonly used approach in at least some Democratic Schools.

== Theory ==
The goals of democratic education vary according to the participants, the location, and access to resources. This differs from the traditional understanding of civic education, where the teaching staff mostly defines the educational goals, and the learning community is not democratically organized.

There is no unified body of literature, spanning multiple disciplines, on democratic education. However, there are theories of democratic education from the following perspectives:

=== Cognitive theory ===
Jean Lave was one of the first and most prominent social anthropologists to discuss cognition in cultural contexts, presenting a firm argument against the functionalist psychology that many educationalists implicitly refer to. For Lave, learning is a process undergone by an actor within a specific context. The skills or knowledge learned in one process are not generalizable nor reliably transferred to other areas of human action. Her primary focus was on mathematics in context and mathematics education.

The broader implications reached by Lave and others who specialize in situated learning are that, beyond the argument that certain knowledge is necessary to be a member of society (a Durkheimian argument), knowledge learned in the context of a school is not reliably transferable to other contexts of practice.

John Locke argues that children are capable of reasoning at a young age: "It will perhaps be wonder'd, that I mention reasoning with children; and yet I cannot but think that the true way of dealing with them. They understand it as early as they do language; and, if I misobserve not, they love to be treated as rational creatures, sooner than is imagin'd," Rousseau disagreed: "Use force with children and reasoning with men."

Humans are innately curious, and democratic education supports the belief that the drive to learn is sufficiently strong to motivate children to become effective adults.

==== Criticism based on cognitive theory ====
The human brain is not fully developed until adulthood (around the age of 25). A disadvantage of teenagers being responsible for their own education is that "young brains have both fast-growing synapses and sections that remain unconnected. This leaves teens easily influenced by their environment and more prone to impulsive behavior".

=== Ethics ===
Democracy can be valued on ethical grounds.

==== Cultural theory ====
Democratic education is consistent with the cultural theory that "learning in school must be continuous with life outside of school" and that children should become active participants in the control and organization of their community.

Research on hunter-gatherer societies indicates that free play and exploration were effective transmitters of the societies' culture to children.

According to George Dennison, democratic environments are social regulators: Our desire to cultivate friendships, engender respect, and maintain what George Dennison terms 'natural authority' encourages us to act in socially acceptable ways (i.e. culturally informed practices of fairness, honesty, congeniality, etc.).

==== Criticism based on cultural theory ====
Children are influenced by many curricula beyond the school curriculum: TV curricula, advertisers' curricula, curricula of religious communities, Girl Scouts and Boy Scouts, encyclopedias etc. and therefore "one of the most significant tasks any school can undertake is to try to develop in youngsters an awareness of these other curricula and an ability to criticize them…it is utter nonsense to think that by turning children loose in an unplanned and unstructured environment they can be freed in any significant way. Rather, they are thereby abandoned to the blind forces of the hucksters, whose primary concern is neither the children, nor the truth, nor the decent future of ... society."

Émile Durkheim argues that the transition from primitive to modern societies occurred in part as elders made a conscious decision to transmit what were deemed the most essential elements of their culture to the following generations. He concludes that modern societies are so complex—much more complex than primitive hunter-gatherer societies—and the roles that individuals must fill in society are so varied, that formal mass-education is necessary to instill social solidarity and what he terms 'secular morality'.

=== Political theory ===
There are various political components of democratic education. One author identifies those elements as inclusivity and rights, equal participation in decision-making, and equal encouragement for success. The Institute for Democratic Education's principles of democratic education identify several political principles:

- The interaction between democratic philosophy and education,
- Pluralistic education,
- School administration by means of democratic procedures,
- Education based on respect for human rights,
- Dialogic evaluation,
- Dialogic relationships, and
- Critical social thinking.

==== Effect on quality of education ====
The type of political socialization that occurs in Democratic Schools is closely related to deliberative democracy theory. Claus Offe and Ulrich Preuss, two theorists of the political culture of deliberative democracies, argue that in its cultural production, deliberative democracy requires "an open-ended and continuous learning process in which the roles of both 'teacher' and 'curriculum' are missing. In other words, what is to be learned is a matter that we must settle in the process of learning itself."

The political culture of a deliberative democracy and its institutions, they argue, would facilitate more "dialogical forms of making one's voice heard" which would "be achieved within a framework of liberty, within which paternalism is replaced by autonomously adopted self-paternalism, and technocratic elitism by the competent and self-conscious judgment of citizens."

As a curricular, administrative, and social operation within schools, democratic education is essentially concerned with equipping people to make "real choices about fundamental aspects of their lives" and happens within and for democracy. It can be "a process where teachers and students work collaboratively to reconstruct curriculum to include everyone." In at least one conception, democratic education teaches students "to participate in consciously reproducing their society, and conscious social reproduction." This role necessitates democratic education happening in a variety of settings and being taught by a variety of people, including "parents, teachers, public officials, and ordinary citizens." Because of this, "democratic education begins not only with children who are to be taught but also with citizens who are to be their teachers."

==== Preparation for life in a democracy ====
The "strongest, political rationale" for democratic education is that it teaches "the virtues of democratic deliberation for the sake of future citizenship." This type of education is often alluded to in the deliberative democracy literature as fulfilling the necessary and fundamental social and institutional changes necessary to develop a democracy that involves intensive participation in group decision making, negotiation, and social life of consequence.

==== Civic education ====
The concept of the hidden curriculum holds that anything taught in an authoritarian setting implicitly teaches authoritarianism. Thus, civic education, if taught in a compulsory setting, undermines its own lessons in democracy. A common belief, e.g., at Democratic Schools and in Children's Republics, is that democracy must be experienced to be learned. This argument conforms to the cognition-in-context research by Lave.

Another common belief, which supports the practice of compulsory classes in civic education, is that passing on democratic values requires an imposed structure.

Arguments about how to transmit democracy, and how much and how early to treat children democratically, are made in various literatures concerning student voice, youth participation, and other elements of youth empowerment.

Standard progressive visions of education as collaboration tend to downplay the workings of power in society. If learners are to "develop a democracy," some scholars have argued, they must be provided with the tools to transform society's non-democratic aspects. Democracy in this sense involves not just "participation in decision making," a vision ascribed especially to Dewey, but the ability to confront power with solidarity.

==== Economic theory ====
Core features of democratic education align with the emerging consensus on 21st-century business and management priorities. Such features include increased collaboration, decentralized organization, and radical creativity.

=== Curriculum theory ===
While Democratic Schools don't have an official curriculum, what each student actually does might be considered their own curriculum. Dewey was an early advocate of inquiry education, in which student questions and interests shaped curriculum, a sharp contrast to the "factory model" that began to predominate education during the 20th century as standardization became a guiding principle of many educational practices. Although there was a resurgence of inquiry education in the 1980s and 1990s the standards movement of the 21st century and the attendant school reform movement have squashed most attempts at authentic inquiry-oriented democratic education practices. The standards movement has reified standardized tests in literacy and writing, neglecting science inquiry, the arts, and critical literacy.

Democratic schools may not consider only reading, writing, and arithmetic to be the real basics for success as an adult. A.S. Neill said "To hell with arithmetic." Nonetheless, there is a common belief that people will eventually learn "the basics" when they develop internal motivation.

Allen Koshewa conducted research that highlighted the tensions between democratic education and the role of teacher control, showing that children in a fifth grade classroom tried to usurp democratic practices by using undue influence to sway others, much as representative democracies often fail to focus on the common good or protect minority interests. He found that class meetings, service education, saturation in the arts, and an emphasis on interpersonal caring helped overcome some of these challenges. Despite the challenges of inquiry-based education, classrooms that allow students to make choices about the curriculum propel them not only to learn about democracy but also to experience it.

== In practice ==
=== Play ===
A striking feature of Democratic Schools is the ubiquity of play. Students of all ages—but especially the younger ones—often spend most of their time either in free play, or playing games (electronic or otherwise). All attempts to limit, control, or direct play must be democratically approved before being implemented. Play is seen as an activity every bit as worthy as academic pursuits, often even more valuable. Play is considered essential for learning, particularly in fostering creativity.

=== Reading, writing, and arithmetic ===
Interest in learning to read occurs across a wide range of ages. Progressive educators emphasize students' choice in reading selections, as well as topics for writing. In addition, Stephen Krashen and other proponents of democratic education emphasize the role of libraries in promoting democratic education. Others, such as children's author Judy Blume, have spoken out against censorship as antagonistic to democratic education, while the school reform movement, which gained traction under the federal initiative 'No Child Left Behind' and later under 'Race to the Top' and the Common Core Standards movement, emphasise strict control over curriculum.

=== Research into democratic education ===
- A study that surveyed students from a homeschool resource center and a Democratic School found that, unlike their peers in conventional schools, learners in these environments did not exhibit any significant decline in motivation to learn as they got older.
- A similar study done in Israel indicates that the decline in interest in science that occurs regularly in conventional schools did not occur in democratic schools.
- A study of 12 schools in the United Kingdom by Derry Hannam, a former school inspector, indicates that democratic schooling produces greater motivation to learn and self-esteem among students.
- Three studies done on students of Sudbury schools in the United States of America indicate that students "have been highly successful in their higher education (for those who chose that route) and careers. They have gone on to all walks of life that are valued in our society and report that they feel advantaged because of the sense of personal responsibility, self-control, continued interest in learning, and democratic values they acquired at Sudbury Valley."
- Sands School in the United Kingdom was inspected in 2013 by Ofsted, which was found to be 'Good' overall with some 'Outstanding' features. No area of the provision was found to be less than "good' and all of the Statutory regulations (the school "Standards") were met in full. This is the same outcome as the previous inspection in 2010. Ofsted observed that taking part in decision-making process developed "exceptional qualities of thoughtfulness and the ability to offer balanced arguments". Good pupil achievements were found to be a "consequence of the democratic structures". Personal development was deemed to be "outstanding" because of the exceptional impact of the democratic principles. The inspector was particularly impressed with pupils' behaviour, noting that "lessons took place in an atmosphere of mutual respect" and that "visitors were greeted with interest and impeccable manners".

Further information on research about Democratic schools

== Education in a democratic society ==
As the English aristocracy was giving way to democracy, Matthew Arnold investigated popular education in France and other countries to determine what form of education suited a democratic age. Arnold wrote that "the spirit of democracy" is part of "human nature itself", which engages in "the effort to affirm one's own essence...to develop one's own existence fully and freely."

During the industrial age, John Dewey argued that children should not all be given the same pre-determined curriculum. In Democracy and Education, he develops a philosophy of education based on democracy. He argues that while children should be active participants in shaping their education and must experience democracy to learn it, they need adult guidance to develop into responsible adults.

Amy Gutmann argues in Democratic Education that in a democratic society, there is a role for everyone in the education of children. These roles are best agreed upon through deliberative democracy.

The journal Democracy and Education investigates "the conceptual foundations, social policies, institutional structures, and teaching/learning practices associated with democratic education." By "democratic education", they mean "educating youth...for active participation in a democratic society."

Yaacov Hecht claims that Democratic Education, which prepares for life in a democratic culture, is the missing piece in the intricate puzzle that is the democratic state.

== Training programs ==
Israel's Institute for Democratic Education and Kibbutzim College in Tel Aviv collaborate to offer a Bachelor of Education (B.Ed.) degree with a Specialization Certificate in Democratic Education. Student teaching placements are in both regular schools and Democratic Schools.

== Networks ==
Networks that support democratic education come primarily from the area of Democratic Schools, but promote democratic education in all areas:

- The Alternative Education Resource Organization launched in 1989 to create a "student-driven, learner-centered approach to education."
- The annual International Democratic Education Conference (IDEC), first held in 1993.
- The Australasian Democratic Education Community, which held its first conference in 2002.
- The European Democratic Education Community was founded in 2008, at the first European Democratic Education Conference.
- The Réseau des écoles démocratiques au Québec, or RÉDAQ, was founded in 2012 to sponsor the creation of Democratic Schools in the province of Québec, Canada.
- The Alliance for Self-Directed Education launched in 2016 to make Self-Directed Education a normal and accessible option for all families.
- Democracy Matters, launched in 2009, is a UK alliance of organizations promoting education for citizenship, participation, and practical politics

IDEC 2005 named two core beliefs: self-determination and democratic governance. EUDEC has both of these beliefs, and mutual respect is also in their belief statement. IDEN supports schools that self-identify as democratic.

== Legal issues ==
=== United Nations ===
United Nations agreements both support and place restrictions on education options, including democratic education:

Article 26(3) of the United Nations Universal Declaration of Human Rights states that "Parents have a prior right to choose the kind of education that shall be given to their children." While this in itself may allow parents the right to choose democratic education, Articles 28 and 29 of the United Nations Convention on the Rights of the Child place requirements on educational programs: Primary education is compulsory, all aspects of each student must be developed to their full potential, and education must include the development of respect for things such as national values and the natural environment, in a spirit of friendship among all peoples.

Furthermore, while Article 12(1) of the Convention mandates that children be able to have input on all matters that affect them, their input will have limited weight, "due weight in accordance with the age and maturity of the child."

=== Summerhill ===
In 1999, Summerhill received a 'notice of complaint' over its policy of non-compulsory lessons, a procedure which would usually have led to closure; Summerhill contested the notice and went before a special educational tribunal. Summerhill was represented by a noted human rights lawyer, Geoffrey Robertson QC. The government's case soon collapsed, and a settlement was offered. This offer was discussed and agreed upon at a formal school meeting, hastily convened in the courtroom by a quorum of pupils and teachers present. The settlement guaranteed that future inspections of Summerhill would be consistent with Summerhill's educational philosophy.

== Theorists ==
- Joseph Agassi – Israeli philosopher, proponent of democracy
- Michael Apple – social scientist, educational theorist
- Matthew Arnold – English poet, cultural critic, wrote about education in an age of democracy
- Sreyashi Jhumki Basu – American researcher, science educator, author of Democratic Science Teaching
- Pierre Bourdieu – French anthropologist, social theorist
- George Dennison – American writer, author
- John Dewey – American social scientist, progressive education theorist
- Émile Durkheim – French sociologist, functionalist education theorist
- Michel Foucault – French postmodern philosopher
- Peter Gray – American psychologist, studied the relationship between education and play
- Daniel Greenberg – "principal philosopher" among the founders of the Sudbury Valley School
- Amy Gutmann – American political scientist, diplomat, and president of the University of Pennsylvania
- Yaacov Hecht – Israeli educator, founder of the Democratic School of Hadera, and founder of IDEC
- John Holt – American critic of conventional education, proponent of un-schooling
- Ivan Illich – Austrian philosopher, priest, author of Deschooling Society
- Lawrence Kohlberg – American professor, psychologist, wrote about moral and democratic education
- Homer Lane – American-English educator, founder of the Ford Republic (1907–12) and the Little Commonwealth (1913–17)
- Deborah Meier – founder of Democratic Schools in New York and Boston, writer, leader of the small schools movement
- A. S. Neill – Scottish educator and author, founder of the Summerhill School
- Claus Offe – German political sociologist, theorist of deliberative democratic culture
- Karl Popper – Austrian-British philosopher of science
- Bertrand Russell – British philosopher, author of On Education and founder of Beacon Hill School

== See also ==
- Alternative education
- Anarchism and education
- Constructivism (philosophy of education)
- Critical pedagogy
- Dialogic learning
- European Democratic Education Community
- European Democratic Education Conference
- Hidden curriculum
- Human rights education
- International Democratic Education Conference
- List of democratic schools
- List of Sudbury schools
- Progressive education
- Right to education
- Rouge Forum
- Taking Children Seriously
