= Sands School =

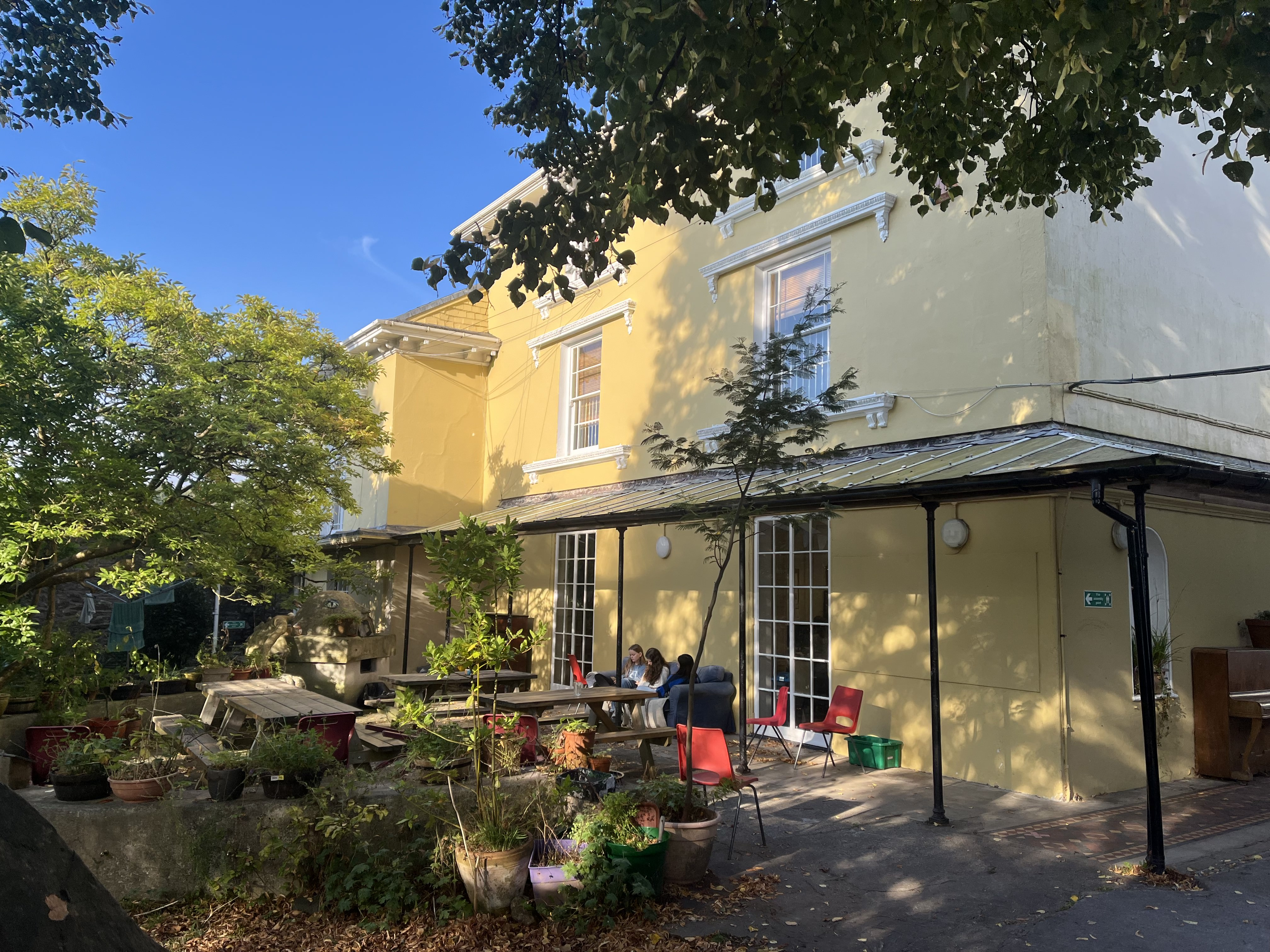
- The terrace plaza outside the main Sands School building.

Location
- East Street; Ashburton, Devon, TQ13 7AX; England; 50.51658°N 3.75257°W

Information
- Type: Independent day school
- Established: 1987
- Founders: David Gribble, Sybilla Higgs, Sean Bellamy
- Local authority: Devon
- Department for Education URN: 113619 Tables
- Ofsted: Reports
- Staff: approx 20 overall
- Gender: Coeducational
- Age: approx 11 to approx 17
- Enrolment: approx 60 to 80 students
- Website: www.sands-school.co.uk

Sands School is a private democratic school in Ashburton, Devon in England.

== Background ==
Sands School is the second democratic school in England and was founded in 1987 by a group of students and teachers from the recently closed Dartington Hall School. Started in the kitchen of a parent's house, the school quickly established its own philosophy, building on the progressive principles of Dartington. The school's name, Sands, comes from the first letters of the first names of two of the founding teachers, Sean Bellamy and Sybilla Higgs: ‘S and S’, or 'Sands'. This shortening came from the letters written by the school's other founding teacher, David Gribble, to Sean and Sybilla in the spring and summer of 1987. The school grew from its original size of 17, and within six months had moved to a large town house in Ashburton where it is still based today.

Since 1991 it has been at the forefront of IDEC, the worldwide international democratic education movement, and has partner schools in Israel, Japan, U.S.A and most European countries. In 2006 the European branch of this movement was launched, EUDEC, and many Sands students are involved in promoting democratic approaches to education both in the private and state sector in the UK and abroad, travelling through Europe to conferences and events aimed at establishing democratic education as a viable alternative to the present educational model. In 2011 the school hosted a combined IDEC and EUDEC conference over ten days with more than 500 people attending from around the world.

Sands is a fee-paying day-school. It has 70 students aged 11 to 17 and 10 teachers and 5 learning support staff. It offers a range of conventional qualifications including thirteen GCSEs, BTEC Performing Arts, and LAMDA certificates, and aims to offer students the chance to develop an approach to learning that is personalised and encourages critical thinking and creativity. There are no uniforms.

== Philosophy ==
The school believes that students should help design their place of learning and be involved in the making of its rules and contributing to its philosophy; that students and teachers should be equal partners in the running of the school and that students should map their own route through their school careers with guidance from the adults. Children can choose what to learn, when to learn and how to learn. They are encouraged to take responsibility for their own learning.

Sands School is run by a weekly School Meeting, which is open to all students and staff and where each person present has one vote, and a School Council consisting of seven elected students: six primary members and a "First Reserve", who will attend in the case that one of the primary members is not present; this group investigates and advises on daily events, feeding information back to the school meeting for decisions and action. It has no head teacher.

The school is split into six year groups, from year 7 to year 12. They are, in ascending order: Y1, Y2, Y3, O3, O2 and O1. The O1 year is optional, although some courses may rely upon it as GCSEs only begin in O3 (year 10.) However, it is not uncommon for students to leave in O2 (year 11) or move up a year group to O1, and hence leave at age 16 as well. Students traditionally join the school in Y1, but there is no restriction on when a student may join the school, so students often join in older years. It is also an accepted practice for students to join Y1 a year early, in certain circumstances.

== Inspections ==
The school was inspected by Ofsted in November 2016 and in October 2013 and was found to be ‘Good’ overall with a number of ‘Outstanding’ features. No area of the provision was found to be less than "good" and all of the Statutory regulations (the school "Standards") were met in full. This is the same outcome as the previous inspection in 2010.
