= George Dennison =

American writer

George Dennison (1925–1987) was an American novelist and short-story author best known for The Lives of Children, his account of the First Street School. He also wrote fiction, plays, and critical essays, most notably his novel Luisa Domic and a collection of shorter works, Pierrot and Other Stories. Having grown up in a suburb of Pittsburgh, he joined the Navy during World War II, attended the New School for Social Research on the GI Bill, and took graduate courses at New York University.

Although he devoted himself primarily to his art, he also taught school for a number of years, at all levels from preschool to high school. He trained at the New York Institute for Gestalt Therapy with Paul Goodman and later worked with severely disturbed children as a lay therapist and teacher. As an educator he promoted the idea that relationships, not instruction, promoted real learning. As such schools needed to be places where freedom of choice created the trust that allows for a full relationship between teachers and students. These ideas were considered radical because they questioned compulsory attendance and the focus on external student behavior to enhance student management. Since the focus on controlling student behavior interferes with relationship, his work suggests a preference for small schools and an implied criticism of large schools, especially in their ability to be effective with high risk students. He believed teaching was an art, not really a science and, as such, it was never technique that caused learning to occur, but rather the full complexity of individual relationships between students and teachers that were not reducible to the predictability of technique. Further, he felt that much of significant learning occurs strictly within the student's individual motivation and between students, when the teachers are wise enough to stand aside and allow it to occur.

His plays were produced at the Judson Memorial Church in New York and elsewhere, and his essays and fiction appeared in many periodicals. In the late Sixties George Dennison and his wife Mabel Chrystie, the founder of the First Street School, moved to rural Maine, where they raised three children.
