= C. maculata =

C. maculata may refer to:

- Cadphises maculata, a Southeast Asian moth
- Caecula maculata, a worm eel
- Caledopteryx maculata, a flatwing damselfly
- Callista maculata, a Venus clam
- Callyspongia maculata, a multicellular organism
- Caloenas maculata, an extinct pigeon
- Calophaena maculata, a ground beetle
- Calophya maculata, a psyllid bug
- Caloplaca maculata, a lichen-forming fungus
- Calopteryx maculata, a broad-winged damselfly
- Calyce maculata, a tumbling flower beetle
- Campylaspis maculata, a crustacean with no free telson
- Canna maculata, a perennial plant
- Canthidermis maculata, an ocean triggerfish
- Cephetola maculata, an African butterfly
- Caridina maculata, an atyid shrimp
- Ceropales maculata, a spider wasp
- Channa maculata, a snakehead native to Asia
- Chimaphila maculata, an evergreen herb
- Chimonobambusa maculata, an evergreen plant
- Chlamydera maculata, an Australian bowerbird
- Chloroclystis maculata, a New Zealand moth
- Chrysasura maculata, a New Guinean moth
- Chrysometa maculata, a long-jawed orb weaver
- Chusquea maculata, a South American mountain bamboo
- Cicuta maculata, a plant native to North America
- Clavelina maculata, a marine animal
- Clemensia maculata, a Peruvian moth
- Clubiona maculata, a leaf-curling sac spider
- Coladenia maculata, an African butterfly
- Coleomegilla maculata, a coccinellid beetle
- Columnea maculata, a flying goldfish plant
- Comatella maculata, a feather star
- Commelina maculata, a herbaceous plant
- Conioscinella maculata, a grass fly
- Corallorhiza maculata, a coralroot orchid
- Cordulegaster maculata, a flying adder
- Coremecis maculata, a geometer moth
- Coryanthes maculata, a South American orchid
- Corymbia maculata, a tree endemic to Australia
- Coryza maculata, a ground beetle
- Cotinga maculata, a bird endemic to southeastern Brazil
- Cranchia maculata, a glass squid
- Crenicichla maculata, a cichlid native to South America
- Crepidula maculata, a sea snail
- Crocosmia maculata, an iris native to South Africa
- Crypsotidia maculata, an owlet moth
- Cryptostylis maculata, a tongue orchid
- Cteniloricaria maculata, an armored catfish
- Cyclopia maculata, a legume endemic to South Africa
- Cypraea maculata, a sea snail
