= Alternative education =

Term referring to forms of non-mainstream educational approaches

Alternative education encompasses educational philosophy differing from mainstream pedagogy and evidence-based education. Such alternative learning environments may be found at state, charter, and independent schools and in home-based learning environments. Many educational alternatives emphasize small class sizes, close relationships between students and teachers, and a sense of community.

The legal framework for such education varies by locality and determines any obligation to conform with mainstream standard tests and grades.

Alternative pedagogical approaches may include different structures, such as the open classroom, different teacher-student relationships, as in Quaker and free schools, and differing curricula and teaching methods, as in Waldorf and Montessori schools. Synonyms for "alternative" in this context include "non-traditional" and "non-conventional". Alternative educators use terms such as "holistic".

== History ==
Alternative education arose in response to the establishment of standardized and compulsory education over the last two to three centuries. Educators including Jean-Jacques Rousseau; Swiss humanitarian Johann Heinrich Pestalozzi; the American transcendentalists Amos Bronson Alcott, Ralph Waldo Emerson, and Henry David Thoreau; founders of progressive education John Dewey and Francis Parker; and educational pioneers such as Friedrich Fröbel, Maria Montessori, and Rudolf Steiner believed that education should cultivate developing children on many levels—not just intellectually but also morally and spiritually, emotionally, psychologically, and physically. After World War II, an alternative Reggio Emilia approach to early-childhood education was developed in Italy, introduced by Loris Malaguzzi.

Cultural critics such as John Caldwell Holt, Paul Goodman, Frederick Mayer, and George Dennison have examined education from individualist, anarchist, and libertarian perspectives. Other writers, from Paulo Freire to American educators Herbert Kohl and Jonathan Kozol, have criticized mainstream Western education from the viewpoint of liberal and radical politics. Research supports an approach that caters to individual interests and learning styles, suggesting that a learner-responsible model is more effective than a teacher-responsible one. Ron Miller has identified five elements common to educational alternatives:

1. Respect for the person
2. Balance
3. Decentralization of authority
4. Noninterference among the political, economic, and cultural spheres of society
5. A holistic worldview

In modern times, at least in some places, the legal right to provide educational alternatives has become established alongside a duty to provide education for school-age children.

== Localities ==
=== Canada ===
Education in Canada falls under the jurisdiction of the provincial government. Alternative education is provided in some public schools, such as Mountainview Montessori School and Trille des Bois Waldorf school in Ottawa, as well as in independent schools, such as Toronto Montessori Schools and Vancouver Waldorf School.

==== Origins ====
Alternative education in Canada stems from two philosophical educational points of view, Progressive and Libertarian. According to Levin, 2006 the term "alternative" was adopted partly to distinguish these schools from the independent, parent-student-teacher-run "free" schools that preceded them (and from which some of the schools actually evolved) and to emphasize the boards' commitment to options within the public school system. The progressive educational tradition places emphasis on both the need to incorporate curriculum and teaching to match the stages of child development and the gradual integration of the child into adult society through planned experiential learning. The sources of stimulus include the philosopher John Dewey in the United States, post-WW1 New Schools in Great Britain, and the Steiner/Waldorf schools in Europe. The Libertarian tradition focuses on the rights of the parents and children to make their own educational and life choices. As Levin notes, "It is rooted in the belief to uphold the individual freedom and the innate goodness of the child against institutional and social conformity and the corrupting influences of modern society."

==== School types ====
The 1980s saw a shift to special schools and/or programs for students who excelled in academia, were artistically talented, or participated in programs that linked schooling with the workplace through a co-operative venture. It might be considered a natural evolution of education to offer options rather than a regimented, one-size-fits-all approach. Most alternative high schools under public jurisdiction offered independent study programs, basic-skills programs, and were mini-high schools with a mixture of conventional and nonconventional courses, as well as schools with an arts focus. They also offered smaller classes, closer and more informal relations with teachers, and greater flexibility in course selection and timetabling. The most recent development within alternative education in Canada may be to follow the United States in their "Charter School" movement. In the US, specific states have passed legislation permitting their departments of education or local school boards to issue "charters" directly to individual schools wishing to operate autonomously. Alberta is the first province that has already embraced this model.

=== India ===
Since the early 20th century, educators have discussed and implemented alternative forms of education, such as Rabindranath Tagore's Visva-Bharati University, Sri Aurobindo's Sri Aurobindo International Centre of Education, Jiddu Krishnamurti Schools. Traditional learning in India involved students living in gurukulas, where they received free food, shelter and education from a guru ("teacher" in Sanskrit). Progress was based on tests given by the gurus, and the system aimed to nurture students' creativity and personality development. Although mainstream education in India is based on the system introduced by Lord Macaulay, a few projects aim to rejuvenate the earlier method. Some students in these (and similar) projects conduct research in Sanskrit studies, Vedic studies, Vedic science, yoga and ayurveda. Others, after completing their education in a gurukula, enter mainstream higher education.

=== Japan ===
Japanese education is a nationwide, standardised system under the Ministry of Education. The only alternatives are accredited private schools with more freedom in curricula (including textbook choice; public schools are limited to government-approved textbooks), teaching methods, and hiring guidelines. Nearly all private schools require a competitive entrance examination and charge tuition, with few scholarships available. Interest in alternative education was sparked during the 1980s by student violence and bullying, school refusal, social anxiety disorder and, in the worst cases, suicide; the desire to enable young people to keep up with a globalised economy is an additional impetus.

A free school is a non-profit group (or independent school) which specialises in the care and education of children who refuse to attend standard schools. The first democratic school was founded in 1985 as a shelter for children avoiding the school environment, and a number of other such schools have been established. In 1987 the first of seven Waldorf schools in Japan was founded, and other alternatives include a growing homeschooling movement.

In 1992 Dr Shinichiro Hori, formerly Professor of Education at Osaka City University, founded the first, Kinokuni Children's Village in Wakayama Prefecture, of several alternative, democratic schools. In all he created six schools in Fukui prefecture, Kitakyushu, and Yamanashi prefecture. As friend and Japanese translator of A.S. Neill his work has been inspired by Summerhill School.

In 2003 Japan introduced Special Zones for Structural Reform (構造改革特別区域), based on China's Special Economic Zone policy, which enable the opening of government-accredited schools providing alternative education. Two years later, the first such school was founded.

Despite the schools' high tuition, some parents send their children to international schools to acquire fluency in a foreign language (usually English). Although international schools are not certified by the Japanese government, many are approved by their native country (the U.S., Canada, Germany, France, Korea and China) and some offer an International Baccalaureate program.

=== Taiwan ===
Founded after the lifting of martial law in Taiwan, the Forest School (森林小學) was the first alternative education school in Taiwan. It seeks to diverge from traditional Chinese education methodology and requires parents of their students to not hit or scold their children. The term 'forest school' has become a generalized term used by schools with alternative education approaches. There is also the case of the Caterpillar, which – like the Forest School – is housed in an unconventional campus and follows a creative and more fluid curriculum. Both these schools charge expensive tuition fees but more personalized instruction.

There is also alternative education that caters to learners with special needs such as the Taipei County's Seedling Elementary School, which opened in 1994. This school caters to native students, who need a different and less stressful learning environment. It integrates traditional courses with strategies that focus on enhancing the learner's bond with nature and aboriginal culture. Another example is the so-called "third-way" education that serves the needs of students that are not local but also not foreign such as the Taipei American School, which provides instruction to Taiwanese students with family in the United States or those with occupations that took them, including their children, abroad.

=== United Kingdom ===
In 2003, there were about 70 schools in the United Kingdom offering education based on philosophies differing from that of the mainstream pedagogy, about half of which are Steiner-Waldorf schools. Summerhill School, established by A.S. Neill in 1921, was the first democratic school; most have since closed, except for Summerhill, Sands School, Hebden Bridge School and democratic schools for children and young people. Though most alternative schools were until recently all fee-paying, state-funded Free Schools were introduced in 2011, only two of which offer alternative education: the Steiner Academy Frome, Somerset, and the Steiner Academy Hereford.

The United Kingdom also has alternative provision schools and centres, designed to prevent exclusions from mainstream school, or improve behavioural problems so that students can re-access mainstream education. Since 1993, some of the centres have been referred to as Pupil Referral Units (PRU). These units are run by the local authority.

In recent years, in addition to Pupil Referral Units, many privately funded units (operated by businesses or charities) have set up versions of PRUs. These are known as private providers of alternative provision.

The influx of private businesses entering the sector has led to concerns being raised by Ofsted and the Department for Education in relation to so called illegal schools operating. Illegal schools refer to alternative provision centres providing students with a full time education without first registering properly as a school. Operating in this way means that providers avoid inspection by Ofsted.

=== United States ===
A variety of educational alternatives exist at the elementary, secondary and tertiary level in three categories: school choice, independent schools and home-based education. The U.S. Department of Education's document State Regulation of Private Schools reports on the legal requirements that apply to K-12 private schools in each of the states, including any curriculum requirements. The report states that it is intended as a reference for public and nonpublic school officials and state policy-makers. The report confirms that similar areas of education are approached in a variety of ways. Trade schools and vocational colleges are also an alternate route to four year traditional college programs.

==== School choice ====
Public-school alternatives in the U.S. include separate schools, classes, programs and semi-autonomous "schools within schools". Public school-choice options are open to all students, although some have waiting lists. Among these are charter schools, combining private initiatives and state funding, and magnet schools, which attract students to a particular program (such as the performing arts).

==== Independent schools ====
Independent, or private, schools have flexibility in staff selection and educational approach. Many are Montessori and Waldorf schools (the latter also known as Steiner schools, after their founder Rudolf Steiner). Other independent schools include democratic or free schools, such as Clonlara School, which is the oldest, continually operating K-12 alternative school in the country, the Sudbury schools, open classroom schools, those based on experiential education and schools using an international curriculum such as the International Baccalaureate and Round Square schools, and traveling schools such as Think Global School.

==== Homeschooling ====
Families seeking alternatives for educational, philosophical or religious reasons, or if there is no nearby educational alternative may opt for home-based education. A minor branch is unschooling, an approach based on interest rather than a curriculum. Others enroll in umbrella schools which provide a curriculum. Homeschool courses give students in-depth, personal attention in any subject with which they struggle or excel. Some homeschool families form a cooperative, where parents with expertise in a subject may teach children from a number of families while their children are taught by other parents. There is great variation amongst families who homeschool, from parents who set up in-home "classrooms" and hold class for a set amount of time each day, to families that focus on experiential learning opportunities. With the growth of digital technology, many families have turned to online schools and virtual homeschooling programs as an alternative or supplement to traditional home-based education. These platforms provide structured curricula, interactive lessons, and teacher support, often allowing students to participate in real-time classes or complete coursework at their own pace. Some online programs operate globally, giving families access to accredited courses and a wide range of subjects regardless of geographic location. The COVID-19 pandemic accelerated this trend, as school closures and remote learning experiences led more parents to explore online education options, both as a temporary solution and as a long-term alternative to conventional schooling.

==== Self-education ====
Self-directed inquiry is recognized at all levels of education, from the "unschooling" of children to the autodidacticism of adults, and may occur separately from (or with) traditional forms of education.

== See also ==
- Alternative schools
- Alternative university
- Anarchism and education
- Education
- Education policy
- Education reform#Alternatives to public education
- European Convention on Human Rights, Article 2
- Experiential education
- Freedom of education
- Free school movement
- Homeschooling
- Informal education
- Progressive education
- Right to education
- Special education
- UnCollege
- Unschooling

=== Forms and approaches of alternative education ===
- Anarchistic free school
- Artful Learning
- Democratic education
- Deschooling
- Free school movement
- Forest kindergarten
- Jiddu Krishnamurti Schools
- Massive open online course
- Modern School Movement
- Montessori education
- Sudbury school
- Thomas Jefferson Education
- Vocational education

=== Educators ===
- John Dewey
- Célestin Freinet
- Friedrich Fröbel
- Ivan Illich
- Joseph Jacotot
- Deborah Meier
- Maria Montessori
- Jean-Jacques Rousseau
- Rudolf Steiner
- Jiddu Krishnamurti
- Bill Nye

=== Organizations ===
- European Democratic Education Community (EUDEC)
- Home School Legal Defense Association (HSLDA)

=== Media ===
- The Forbidden Education, a documentary film about alternative education

=== Public law on education in the US ===
- Bennett Law
- Oregon Compulsory Education Act
- Meyer v. Nebraska
