= Remida =

Remida or Re Mida may refer to:

- A recycling concept promoted by the Reggio Children Foundation
- Re Mida, the Italian name for King Midas
- Clemensia remida, a moth native to Guatemala
