= Artful Learning =

- Founded: 1992
- Founder: Leonard Bernstein
- Type: Nonprofit organization
- Purpose: Using Arts and the artistic process in the teaching of all academic subjects
- Location: United States
- Owner: Leonard Bernstein Office
- Website: http://www.artfullearning.org

Artful Learning is an educational philosophy model that is concept-based and interdisciplinary. Artful Learning was initiated by Leonard Bernstein and is rooted in using the arts to enhance all areas of education.

== History ==
In 1990, Leonard Bernstein received the Praemium Imperiale, an international prize awarded by the Japan Arts Association for lifetime achievement in the arts. Bernstein used the $100,000 prize to establish The Bernstein Education Through the Arts (BETA) Fund, Inc. Leonard Bernstein provided this grant to develop an arts-based education program. The Leonard Bernstein Center was established in April 1992, and initiated extensive school-based research, resulting in the Bernstein Model. After six years of association with the Grammy Foundation, the Leonard Bernstein Center for Learning moved to Gettysburg College, PA.

== Model ==
Artful Learning is based on Bernstein's philosophy that the arts can strengthen learning and be incorporated in all academic subjects. The program is based on "units of study," which each consist of four core elements: experience, inquire, create, and reflect.

== Research ==
Research shows that participation in the arts plays a vital role in influencing brain development and performance. Arts, which are considered enrichment in education programs, may in fact be central to the way humans neurologically process and learn. In 1999, The President's Committee on the Arts and Humanities teamed up with the Arts Education Partnership to publish a comprehensive study on the inclusion of the arts in education.

== See also ==
- Alternative education
- Project-based learning
- Kindergarten
- Montessori method
- Waldorf education
- Sudbury school
- Summerhill School
- Friedrich Fröbel
- Reggio Children - Loris Malaguzzi Centre Foundation
