= Clemensia panthera =

Scientific classification
- Domain: Eukaryota
- Kingdom: Animalia
- Phylum: Arthropoda
- Class: Insecta
- Order: Lepidoptera
- Superfamily: Noctuoidea
- Family: Erebidae
- Subfamily: Arctiinae
- Genus: Clemensia
- Species: C. panthera

Binomial name
- Clemensia panthera (Schaus, 1896)

Synonyms
- Nola panthera Schaus, 1896

Species of moth

Clemensia panthera is a moth of the family Erebidae first described by William Schaus in 1896. It is found in São Paulo, Brazil.
