= Clemensia chala =

Scientific classification
- Domain: Eukaryota
- Kingdom: Animalia
- Phylum: Arthropoda
- Class: Insecta
- Order: Lepidoptera
- Superfamily: Noctuoidea
- Family: Erebidae
- Subfamily: Arctiinae
- Genus: Clemensia
- Species: C. chala

Binomial name
- Clemensia chala Schaus, 1921

Species of moth

Clemensia chala is a moth of the family Erebidae first described by William Schaus in 1921. It is found in Guatemala.
