= Clemensia incerta =

Scientific classification
- Kingdom: Animalia
- Phylum: Arthropoda
- Clade: Pancrustacea
- Class: Insecta
- Order: Lepidoptera
- Superfamily: Noctuoidea
- Family: Erebidae
- Subfamily: Arctiinae
- Genus: Clemensia
- Species: C. incerta

Binomial name
- Clemensia incerta Gibeaux, 1983

Species of moth

Clemensia incerta is a moth of the family Erebidae. It is found in French Guiana.
