= Clemensia pontenova =

Scientific classification
- Domain: Eukaryota
- Kingdom: Animalia
- Phylum: Arthropoda
- Class: Insecta
- Order: Lepidoptera
- Superfamily: Noctuoidea
- Family: Erebidae
- Subfamily: Arctiinae
- Genus: Clemensia
- Species: C. pontenova

Binomial name
- Clemensia pontenova Dognin, 1923

Species of moth

Clemensia pontenova is a moth of the family Erebidae. It is found in the Amazon region of Brazil.
