= Clemensia flava =

Scientific classification
- Domain: Eukaryota
- Kingdom: Animalia
- Phylum: Arthropoda
- Class: Insecta
- Order: Lepidoptera
- Superfamily: Noctuoidea
- Family: Erebidae
- Subfamily: Arctiinae
- Genus: Clemensia
- Species: C. flava

Binomial name
- Clemensia flava E. D. Jones, 1914

Species of moth

Clemensia flava is a moth of the family Erebidae first described by E. Dukinfield Jones in 1914. It is found in Brazil.
