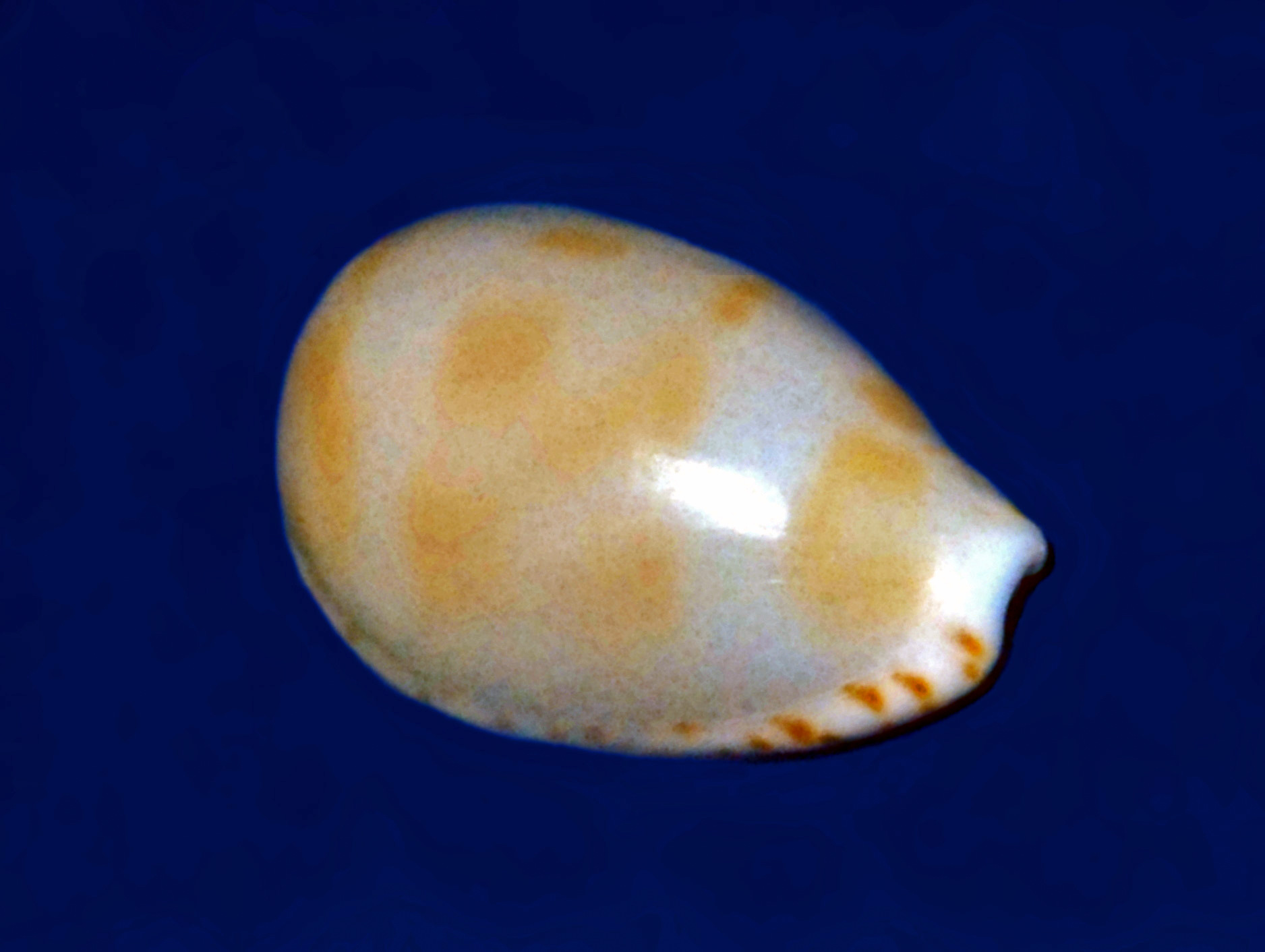
- Shell of Notocypraea piperita from Australia at the Museo Civico di Storia Naturale di Milano
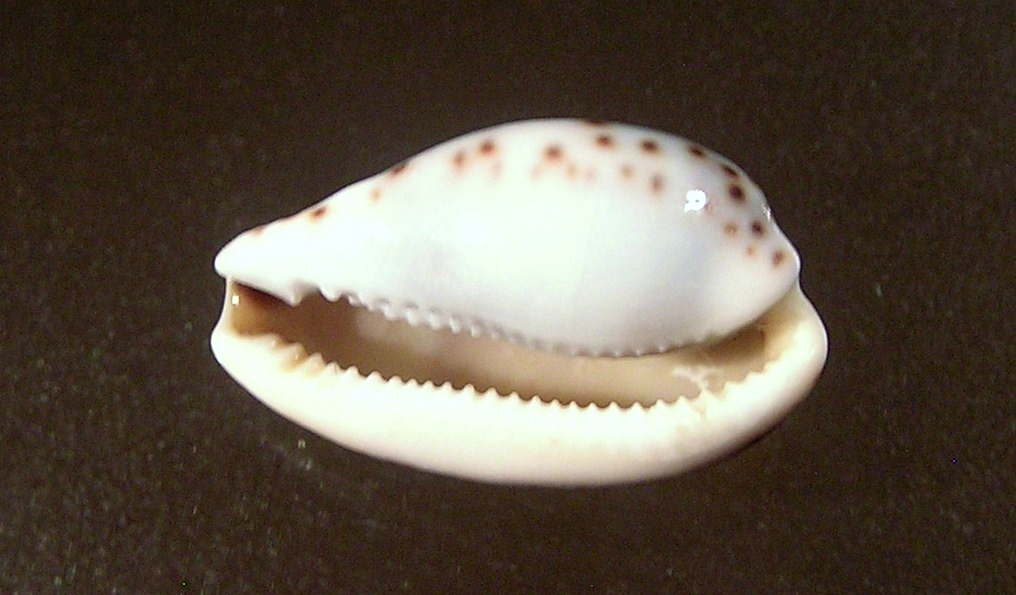
- Ventral view

Scientific classification
- Kingdom: Animalia
- Phylum: Mollusca
- Class: Gastropoda
- Subclass: Caenogastropoda
- Order: Littorinimorpha
- Family: Cypraeidae
- Genus: Notocypraea
- Species: N. piperita

Binomial name
- Notocypraea piperita Gray, 1825

Synonyms
- Cypraea piperita Gray, 1825; Cypraea bicolor Gaskoin, 1849; Cypraea piperita var. leucochroa Sullioti, 1924; Erronea angustata piperita (Gray, 1825); Erronea angustata piperita var. reticulifera Gray

= Notocypraea piperita =

Species of gastropod

Notocypraea piperita, common name peppered cowrie, is a species of sea snail, a cowry, a marine gastropod mollusk in the family Cypraeidae, the cowries.

== Description ==
Notocypraea piperita has a shell reaching a size of 16–30 mm. The dorsum surface usually shows pale brown or peach-coloured transversal bands on a paler background, while the base is whitish or yellowish, with small dark spots on the ventral margin.

== Habitat ==
This cowry lives subtidally on rocks.

== Distribution ==
This species and its subspecies occur in the seas along southern Australia and northern Tasmania.

== Subspecies ==
- Notocypraea piperita bicolor Gaskoin, 1849
- Notocypraea piperita piperita Gray, 1825
