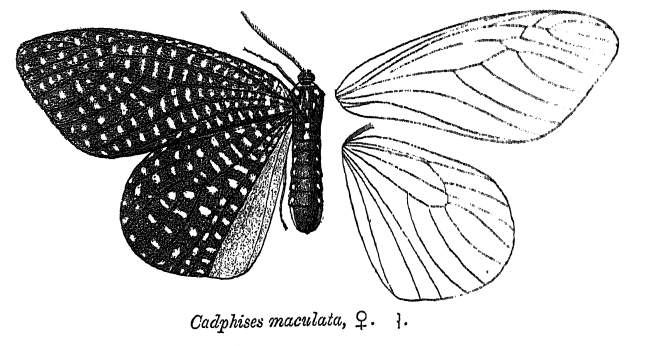
- Cadphises maculata

Scientific classification
- Domain: Eukaryota
- Kingdom: Animalia
- Phylum: Arthropoda
- Class: Insecta
- Order: Lepidoptera
- Family: Zygaenidae
- Genus: Cadphises; Moore, 1866

= Cadphises =

Genus of moths

Cadphises is a genus of moths belonging to the family Zygaenidae.

== Species ==
There are four recognized species:

- Cadphises azim Doubleday, 1847
- Cadphises maculata Moore, 1865
- Cadphises moorei Butler, 1875
- Cadphises parva Horie & Kishida, 2016
