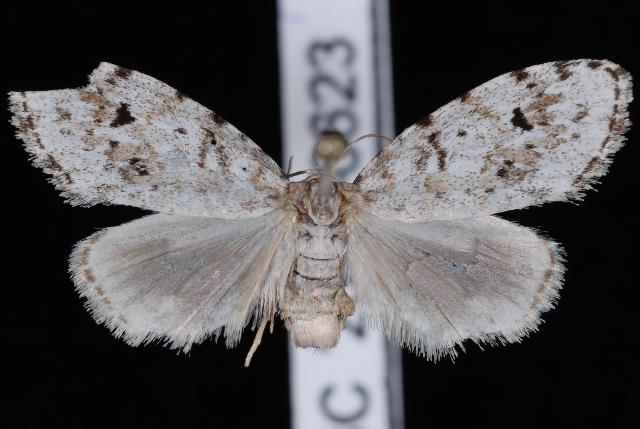

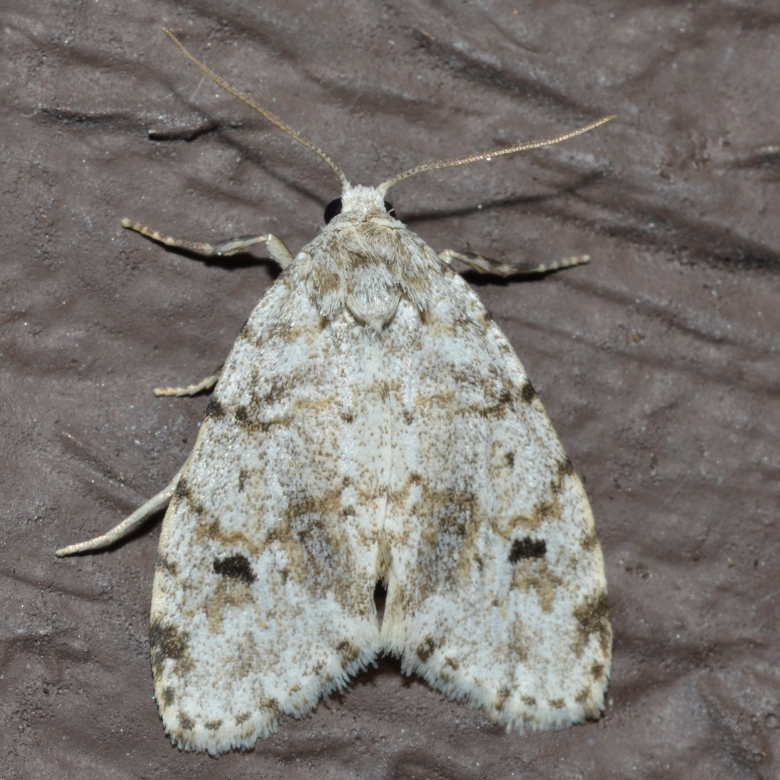

Scientific classification
- Kingdom: Animalia
- Phylum: Arthropoda
- Clade: Pancrustacea
- Class: Insecta
- Order: Lepidoptera
- Superfamily: Noctuoidea
- Family: Erebidae
- Subfamily: Arctiinae
- Genus: Clemensia
- Species: C. albata

Binomial name
- Clemensia albata Packard, 1864

Synonyms
- Clemensia albata Packard, 1864; Nola patella Druce, 1885; Nola philodina Druce, 1885; Uxia albida Walker, 1866; Repa cana Walker, 1866; Clemensia umbrata Packard, 1872; Clemensia irrorata H. Edwards, 1873

= Clemensia albata =

Little white lichen moth

Species of moth

Clemensia albata, the little white lichen moth, is a moth of the family Erebidae. It was described by Alpheus Spring Packard in 1864. It is found in eastern North America, west across boreal Canada to south-eastern British Columbia. The range extends along the Pacific Coast south to Monterey Bay in west-central California. The habitat consists of moist forests, including coastal rainforests, oak woodlands and mixed hardwood forests.

The length of the forewings is 10–11 mm. Adults are on wing from late June to early September. They have also been recorded feeding on algae.

== Subspecies ==
- Cissura albata albata
- Cissura albata umbrata Packard, 1872
