= Clemensia cincinnata =

Scientific classification
- Domain: Eukaryota
- Kingdom: Animalia
- Phylum: Arthropoda
- Class: Insecta
- Order: Lepidoptera
- Superfamily: Noctuoidea
- Family: Erebidae
- Subfamily: Arctiinae
- Genus: Clemensia
- Species: C. cincinnata

Binomial name
- Clemensia cincinnata Schaus, 1911

Species of moth

Clemensia cincinnata is a moth of the family Erebidae. It is found in Costa Rica.
