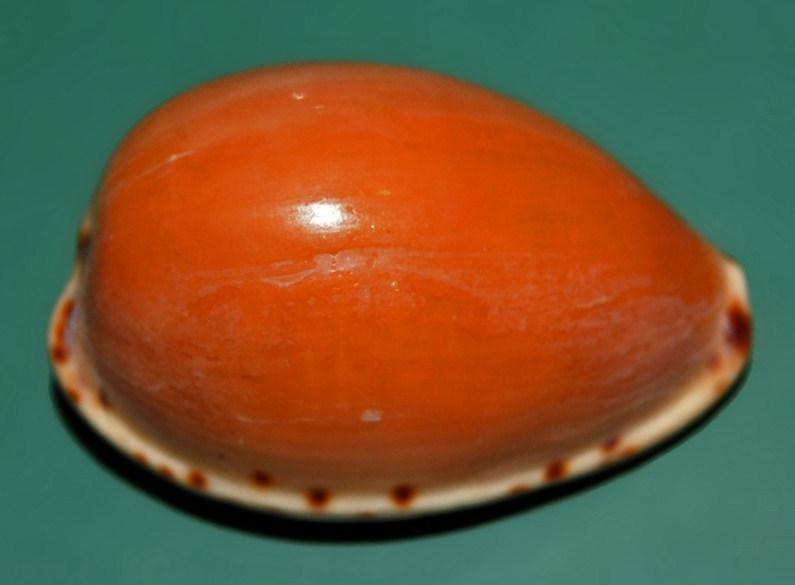
- A dorsal view of the shell of Notocypraea angustata

Scientific classification
- Kingdom: Animalia
- Phylum: Mollusca
- Class: Gastropoda
- Subclass: Caenogastropoda
- Order: Littorinimorpha
- Superfamily: Cypraeoidea
- Family: Cypraeidae
- Genus: Notocypraea; Schilder, 1927

Type species
- Cypraea piperita Gray, 1825

Synonyms
- Cypraea (Notocypraea); Guttacypraea Iredale, 1935; Thelxinovum Iredale, 1931

= Notocypraea =

Genus of gastropods

Notocypraea is a genus of sea snail, a cowry, a marine gastropod mollusk in the family Cypraeidae, the cowries.

== Species ==
- Notocypraea angustata (Gmelin, 1791)
- Notocypraea comptoni (Gray, 1847)
- Notocypraea declivis (G.B. Sowerby II, 1870)
- Notocypraea dissecta Iredale, 1930
- Notocypraea piperita (Gray, 1825)
- Notocypraea pulicaria (Reeve, 1846)
- Notocypraea subcarnea (Beddome, 1897)

Taxon inquirendum

- Notocypraea occidentalis Iredale, 1935

Species brought into synonymy

- Notocypraea bicolor (Gaskoin, 1849): synonym of Notocypraea piperita bicolor (Gaskoin, 1849)
- Notocypraea casta Schilder & Summers, 1963: synonym of Notocypraea comptonii (Gray, 1847)
- Notocypraea hartsmithi (Schilder, 1967): synonym of Notocypraea dissecta Iredale, 1931
- Notocypraea musumea (Kuroda & Habe, 1961): synonym of Palmulacypraea musumea (Kuroda & Habe, 1961)
- Notocypraea verconis Cotton & Godfrey, 1932: synonym of Notocypraea angustata (Gmelin, 1791)
