= Clemensia lacteata =

Scientific classification
- Kingdom: Animalia
- Phylum: Arthropoda
- Class: Insecta
- Order: Lepidoptera
- Superfamily: Noctuoidea
- Family: Erebidae
- Subfamily: Arctiinae
- Genus: Clemensia
- Species: C. lacteata

Binomial name
- Clemensia lacteata Hampson, 1914

Synonyms
- Disoidemata lactea Rothschild, 1912

Species of moth

Clemensia lacteata is a moth of the family Erebidae. It is found in Peru.
