= Clemensia subleis =

Scientific classification
- Domain: Eukaryota
- Kingdom: Animalia
- Phylum: Arthropoda
- Class: Insecta
- Order: Lepidoptera
- Superfamily: Noctuoidea
- Family: Erebidae
- Subfamily: Arctiinae
- Genus: Clemensia
- Species: C. subleis

Binomial name
- Clemensia subleis Schaus, 1905

Species of moth

Clemensia subleis is a moth of the family Erebidae. It is found in French Guiana.
