= Clemensia ophrydina =

Scientific classification
- Domain: Eukaryota
- Kingdom: Animalia
- Phylum: Arthropoda
- Class: Insecta
- Order: Lepidoptera
- Superfamily: Noctuoidea
- Family: Erebidae
- Subfamily: Arctiinae
- Genus: Clemensia
- Species: C. ophrydina

Binomial name
- Clemensia ophrydina (H. Druce, 1885)

Synonyms
- Nola ophrydina Druce, 1885; Clemensia picosa Dognin, 1897

Species of moth

Clemensia ophrydina is a moth of the family Erebidae first described by Herbert Druce in 1885. It is found in Mexico, Guatemala and Ecuador.
