= Chrysasura =

Scientific classification
- Domain: Eukaryota
- Kingdom: Animalia
- Phylum: Arthropoda
- Class: Insecta
- Order: Lepidoptera
- Superfamily: Noctuoidea
- Family: Erebidae
- Subfamily: Arctiinae
- Subtribe: Nudariina
- Genus: Chrysasura; Hampson, 1914

Genus of moths

Chrysasura is a genus of moths in the family Erebidae. The genus was erected by George Hampson in 1914.

== Species ==
- Chrysasura flavopunctata
- Chrysasura leopardina
- Chrysasura meeki
- Chrysasura postvitreata
