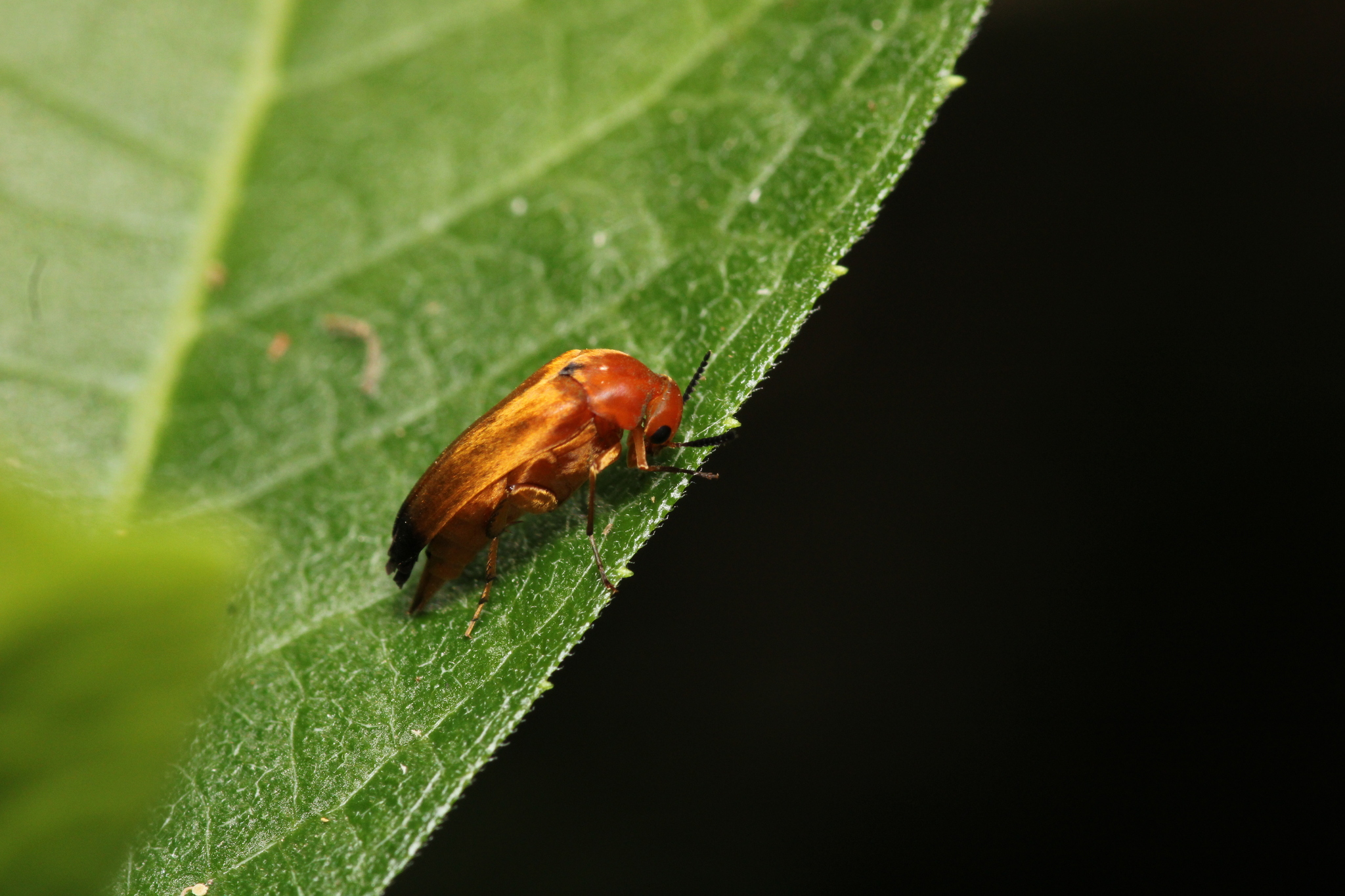
- Calyce, Brazil

Scientific classification
- Kingdom: Animalia
- Phylum: Arthropoda
- Class: Insecta
- Order: Coleoptera
- Suborder: Polyphaga
- Infraorder: Cucujiformia
- Family: Mordellidae
- Subfamily: Mordellinae
- Tribe: Mordellistenini
- Genus: Calyce; Champion, 1891

= Calyce (beetle) =

Genus of beetles

Calyce is a genus of tumbling flower beetles in the family Mordellidae. There are at least five described species in Calyce, found in Central and South America.

== Species ==
These species belong to the genus Calyce.

- Calyce allemandi Leblanc, 2013
- Calyce cardinalis Blair, 1922
- Calyce fulva Champion, 1891
- Calyce horioni Ermisch, 1942
- Calyce maculata Pic, 1911
