= Clemensia leisova =

Scientific classification
- Kingdom: Animalia
- Phylum: Arthropoda
- Class: Insecta
- Order: Lepidoptera
- Superfamily: Noctuoidea
- Family: Erebidae
- Subfamily: Arctiinae
- Genus: Clemensia
- Species: C. leisova

Binomial name
- Clemensia leisova Dyar, 1910

Species of moth

Clemensia leisova is a moth of the family Erebidae. It is found in Mexico.
