= Chrysasura flavopunctata =

Scientific classification
- Kingdom: Animalia
- Phylum: Arthropoda
- Clade: Pancrustacea
- Class: Insecta
- Order: Lepidoptera
- Superfamily: Noctuoidea
- Family: Erebidae
- Subfamily: Arctiinae
- Genus: Chrysasura
- Species: C. flavopunctata

Binomial name
- Chrysasura flavopunctata (Bethune-Baker, 1904)

Synonyms
- Halone flavopunctata Bethune-Baker, 1904; Halone punctatissima Rothschild, 1913

Species of moth

Chrysasura flavopunctata is a moth of the family Erebidae. The moth was first described by George Thomas Bethune-Baker in 1904. It is found in New Guinea.
