= Reggio Emilia approach =

Educational philosophy and pedagogy

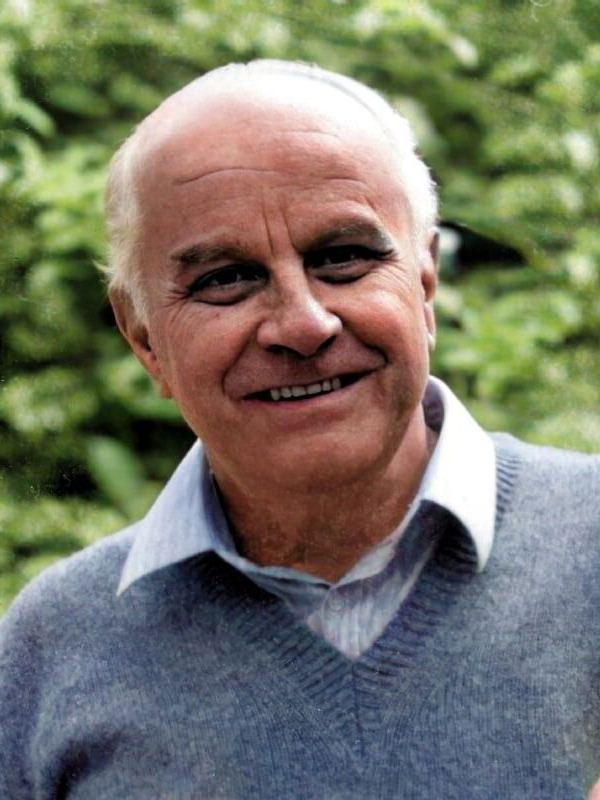
Loris Malaguzzi, founder of the Reggio Emilia approach

The Reggio Emilia approach is an educational philosophy and pedagogy focused on preschool and primary education. This approach is a student-centered and constructivist self-guided curriculum that uses self-directed, experiential learning in relationship-driven environments. The programme is based on the principles of respect, responsibility and community through exploration, discovery, and play.

At the core of this philosophy is an assumption that children form their own personality during the early years of development and that they are endowed with "a hundred languages", through which they can express their ideas. The aim of the Reggio approach is to teach children how to use these symbolic languages (e.g. painting, sculpting, drama) in everyday life. This approach was developed after World War II by pedagogist Loris Malaguzzi and parents in the villages around Reggio Emilia, Italy; the approach derives its name from the city.

== History ==
During the post-World War II era in Italy, the country was overcome with a “…desire to bring change and create anew", brought on by significant economic and social development, including in education. An account described how a 1976 opposition to the primary education policy of the municipality of Reggio Emilia opened up the preschools to public scrutiny. This resulted in the introduction of the Reggio approach to early education, which was supported by parents and the community.

The approach was based on Malaguzzi’s method, which became known to and appreciated by many educators thanks to a touring exhibition titled, "A Child has 100 Languages. On Creative Pedagogy at Public Kindergartens in Reggio Emilia, Italy", which opened in 1981 at the Modern Museet in Stockholm, Sweden. As a result, the National Group for Work and Study on Infant Toddler Centers was formed. By 1991, Newsweek reported that the schools at Reggio Emilia were among the top school systems in the world.

On May 24, 1994, the nonprofit organization Friends of Reggio Children International Association was founded to promote the work of Loris Malaguzzi and to organize professional development and cultural events around the approach. In November 2002, during the annual conference of the National Association for the Education of Young Children in Chicago, the North American Reggio Emilia Alliance was formally established.

In 2003, the municipality of Reggio Emilia chose to manage the system and the network of school services and toddler centres by forming the Istituzione Scuole e Nidi d'Infanzia. This enabled municipal schools and preschools to have independent Reggio-inspired programmes and activities with support from the Italian government.

In February 2006, the Loris Malaguzzi International Centre was established in Reggio Emilia, Italy, as a meeting place for professional development and a research hub for the Reggio philosophy. On September 29, 2011, the nonprofit Reggio Children-Loris Malaguzzi Centre Foundation was established at the Loris Malaguzzi International Centre to foster “education and research to improve the lives of people and communities, in Reggio Emilia and in the world”.

== Philosophy ==
The Reggio Emilia philosophy is based upon the following set of principles:

- Children must have some control over the direction of their learning;
- Children must be able to learn through experiences of touching, moving, listening, and observing;
- Children have a relationship with other children and with material items in the world that they must be allowed to explore;
- Children must have endless ways and opportunities to express themselves.

The Reggio Emilia approach to teaching young children puts the natural development of children as well as the close relationships that they share with their environment at the center of its philosophy. The foundation of the Reggio Emilia approach lies in its unique view of the child: to foster education in the youngest learners to promote the best possible integration among children’s "100 languages". In this approach, there is a belief that children have rights and should be given opportunities to develop their potential. Children are considered to be “knowledge bearers”, so they are encouraged to share their thoughts and ideas about everything they could meet or do during the day. “Influenced by this belief, the child is beheld as beautiful, powerful, competent, creative, curious, and full of potential and ambitious desires." The child is viewed as being an active constructor of knowledge. Rather than being seen as the target of instruction, children are seen as having the active role of an apprentice. This role also extends to that of a researcher. Much of the instruction at Reggio Emilia schools takes place in the form of projects where they have opportunities to explore, observe, hypothesize, question, and discuss to clarify their understanding. Children are also viewed as social beings and a focus is made on the child in relation to other children, the family, the teachers, and the community rather than on each child in isolation. They are taught that respect for everyone else is important because everyone is a “subjective agency ” while existing as part of a group.

The Reggio Emilia approach to early education reflects a theoretical kinship with John Dewey, Jean Piaget, Lev Vygotsky and Jerome Bruner, among others. Much of what occurs in the class reflects a constructivist approach to early education. Reggio Emilia's approach does challenge some conceptions of teacher competence and developmentally appropriate practice. For example, teachers in Reggio Emilia assert the importance of being confused as a contributor to learning; thus a major teaching strategy is purposely to allow mistakes to happen, or to begin a project with no clear sense of where it might end. Another characteristic that is counter to the beliefs of many Western educators is the importance of the child's ability to negotiate in the peer group.

One of the most challenging aspects of the Reggio Emilia approach is the solicitation of multiple points of view regarding children's needs, interests, and abilities, and the concurrent faith in parents, teachers, and children to contribute in meaningful ways to the determination of school experiences. Teachers trust themselves to respond appropriately to children's ideas and interests, they trust children to be interested in things worth knowing about, and they trust parents to be informed and productive members of a cooperative educational team. The result is an atmosphere of community and collaboration that is developmentally appropriate for adults and children alike.

== Community support and parental involvement ==
Reggio Emilia's tradition of community support for families with young children expands on a view, more strongly held in Emilia Romagna and Tuscany, of children as the collective responsibility of the local community. In Reggio Emilia, the infant/toddler and pre-primary program is a vital part of the community, as reflected in the high level of financial support. Community involvement is also apparent in citizen membership in La Consulta, a school committee that exerts significant influence over local government policy.

Parents are a vital component to the Reggio Emilia philosophy; they are viewed as partners, collaborators, and advocates for their children. Teachers respect parents as each child's first teacher and involve parents in every aspect of the curriculum. It is not uncommon to see parents volunteering within Reggio Emilia classrooms throughout the school. This philosophy does not end when the child leaves the classroom. Some parents who choose to send their children to a Reggio Emilia program incorporate many of the principles within their parenting and home life. The parents' role mirrors the community's, at both the school-wide and the classroom level. Parents are expected to take part in discussions about school policy, child development concerns, and curriculum planning and evaluation.

== Role of teachers ==
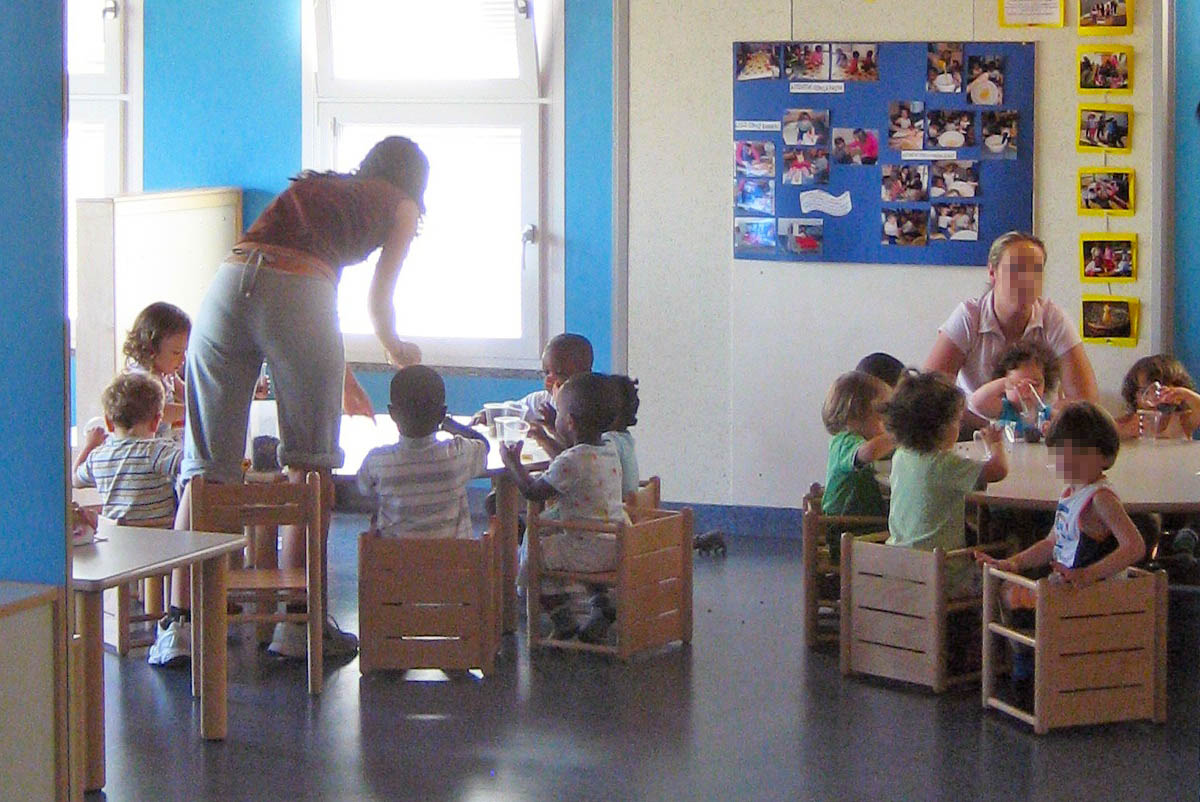
Teachers and children in an Italian nursery school

In the Reggio approach, the teacher is considered a co-learner and collaborator with the child and not just an instructor. Teachers are encouraged to facilitate the child's learning by planning activities and lessons based on the child's interests, asking questions to further understanding, and actively engaging in the activities alongside the child, instead of passively observing the child learning. "As partner to the child, the teacher is inside the learning situation" (Hewett, 2001).

Some implementations of the Reggio Emilia approach self-consciously juxtapose their conception of the teacher as autonomous co-learner with other approaches. For example:

Teachers' long-term commitment to enhancing their understanding of children is at the crux of the Reggio Emilia approach. They compensate for the meagre pre-service training of Italian early childhood teachers by providing extensive staff development opportunities, with goals determined by the teachers themselves. Teacher autonomy is evident in the absence of teacher manuals, curriculum guides, or achievement tests. The lack of externally imposed mandates is joined by the imperative that teachers become skilled observers of children in order to inform their curriculum planning and implementation.

While working on projects with the child, the teacher can also expand the child's learning by collecting data that can be reviewed at a later time. The teacher needs to maintain an active, mutual participation in the activity to help ensure that the child clearly understands what is being "taught". Teachers partner with colleagues, students, and parents in the learning process. They discuss their observations with them, as part of an ongoing dialogue and continuing evolution of their ideas and practices. This allows them to be flexible in their plans, preparations, and teaching approaches.

Often, teachers listen to and observe children in the classroom and record their observations to help plan the curriculum and prepare the environment and teaching tools to support the student's interests.

=== Documentation ===
Using a variety of media, teachers give careful attention to the documentation and presentation of the thinking of the students. Rather than following standardized assessments, the teacher inquires and listens closely to the children. An example of documentation might be a book or panel with the student’s words, drawings, and photographs. By making learning visible, the student's thinking and feeling can be studied while the documentation serves to help with evaluation of the educators' work and refinement of the curriculum. It provides parents information regarding their child’s learning experience while creating an archive for the class and school.

== Role of the environment ==
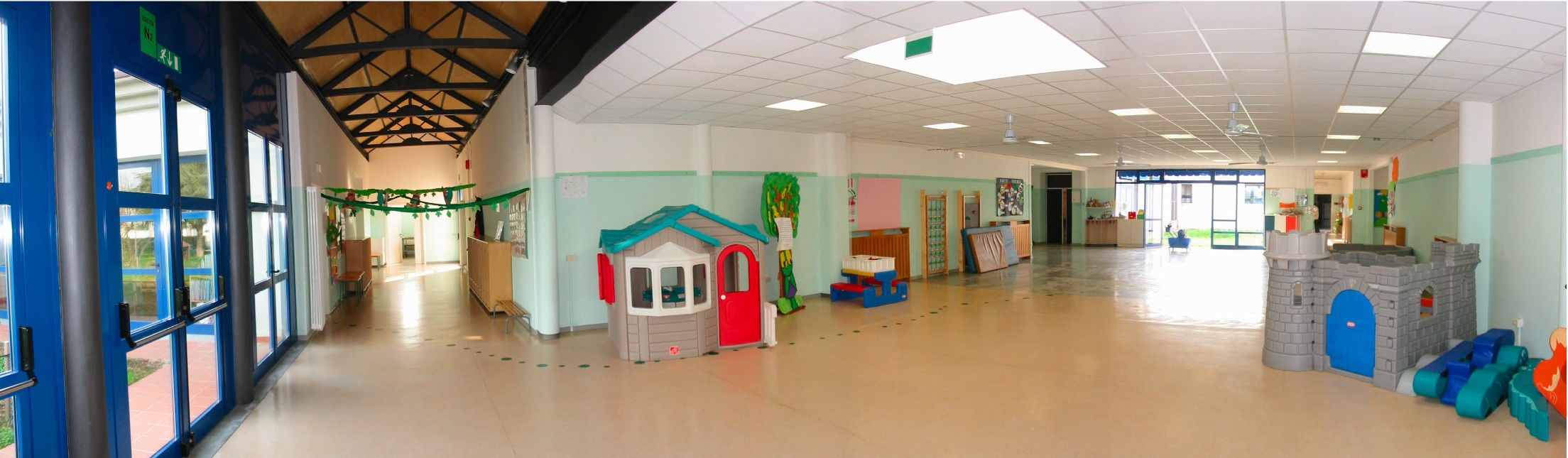
The "piazza": common space in a preschool

Malaguzzi believed the physical environment to be of fundamental importance to early childhood education; he referred to it as the "third teacher", alongside adults and peers. One of the central aims in the design of spaces, or the redesign of existing ones, is to integrate the classroom with the wider school and surrounding community. The environment is seen as essential for children to create meaning, supporting "complex, varied, sustained, and changing relationships between people, the world of experience, ideas, and the many ways of expressing ideas".

Reggio-inspired preschools often incorporate natural light, plants, and access to outdoor areas. Classrooms are typically arranged around a central piazza, with open kitchens, courtyards, and large windows to connect inside and outside spaces. Displays of children’s work, mirrors, and photographs are used to engage learners and document their experiences. Materials are carefully arranged to highlight their aesthetic qualities, while shared studio spaces (atelier) provide opportunities for individual and group creativity.

The influence of this environmental philosophy can also be seen in other educational movements. For example, the Forest School model builds its ethos on the principle that the natural outdoor environment itself is a teacher, shaping children’s confidence, resilience, and social development through sustained contact with woodland settings.

In both Reggio Emilia and Forest School approaches, cohorts of children often stay with the same teacher for several years, creating consistency in relationships and fostering a strong sense of community.

== Long-term projects as vehicles for learning ==
The curriculum is characterized by many features advocated by contemporary research on young children, including real-life problem-solving among peers, with numerous opportunities for creative thinking and exploration. Teachers often work on projects with small groups of children, while the rest of the class engages in a wide variety of self-selected activities typical of preschool classrooms.

The projects that teachers and children engage in are different in a number of ways from those that characterize American teachers' conceptions of unit or thematic studies. The topic of investigation may derive directly from teacher observations of children's spontaneous play and exploration. Project topics are also selected on the basis of an academic curiosity or social concern on the part of teachers or parents, or serendipitous events that direct the attention of the children and teachers. Reggio teachers place a high value on their ability to improvise and respond to children's predisposition to enjoy the unexpected. Regardless of their origins, successful projects are those that generate a sufficient amount of interest and uncertainty to provoke children's creative thinking and problem-solving and are open to different avenues of exploration. Because curriculum decisions are based on developmental and sociocultural concerns, small groups of children of varying abilities and interests, including those with special needs, work together on projects.

Projects begin with teachers observing and questioning children about the topic of interest. Based on children's responses, teachers introduce materials, questions, and opportunities that provoke children to further explore the topic. While some of these teacher provocations are anticipated, projects often move in unanticipated directions as a result of problems children identify. Thus, curriculum planning and implementation revolve around open-ended and often long-term projects that are based on the reciprocal nature of teacher-directed and child-initiated activity. All of the topics of interest are given by the children. Within the project approach, children are given opportunities to make connections between prior and new knowledge while engaging in authentic tasks.

== The hundred languages of children ==
The term "hundred languages of children" refers to the many ways that children have of expressing themselves. Reggio teachers provide children different avenues for thinking, revising, constructing, negotiating, developing and symbolically expressing their thoughts and feelings. The goal is for the adults and children to better understand one another.

As children proceed in an investigation, generating and testing their hypotheses, they are encouraged to depict their understanding through one of many symbolic languages, including drawing, sculpture, dramatic play, and writing. They work together toward the resolution of problems that arise. Teachers facilitate and then observe debates regarding the extent to which a child's drawing or other form of representation lives up to the expressed intent. Revision of drawings (and ideas) is encouraged, and teachers allow children to repeat activities and modify each other's work in the collective aim of better understanding the topic. Teachers foster children's involvement in the processes of exploration and evaluation, acknowledging the importance of their evolving products as vehicles for exchange.

== Education models inspired by Reggio Emilia ==
The Reggio Emilia philosophy has influenced a range of educational models internationally, particularly within early childhood education. Its emphasis on environment, collaboration, and project-based inquiry has been adopted and adapted in diverse contexts.

In the United States, many early learning centres, elementary schools, and public school districts have introduced Reggio-inspired programmes, often integrating ateliers (studio spaces) and documentation practices into their curricula. Teacher education programmes in North America, Australia, and Scandinavia have also used Reggio principles as a framework for reflective pedagogy and learner-centred practice.

The Forest School model shares a similar ethos in its emphasis on the environment as an active teacher. Whereas Reggio Emilia settings often use designed indoor and outdoor spaces, Forest Schools are rooted in natural woodland environments, aiming to build children’s resilience, confidence, and social skills through long-term contact with nature.

Other related approaches include project-based learning, democratic schools, and holistic education frameworks, which draw on Reggio Emilia’s emphasis on child agency, collaboration, and the integration of creative expression into daily learning.

== See also ==
- Alternative education
- Charlotte Mason
- Friedrich Fröbel
- Forest Schools
- Kindergarten
- Montessori education
- Project-based learning
- Reggio Children - Loris Malaguzzi Centre Foundation
- Social constructivism
- Sudbury school
- Summerhill School
- Waldorf education
