= Clemensia marmorata =

Scientific classification
- Domain: Eukaryota
- Kingdom: Animalia
- Phylum: Arthropoda
- Class: Insecta
- Order: Lepidoptera
- Superfamily: Noctuoidea
- Family: Erebidae
- Subfamily: Arctiinae
- Genus: Clemensia
- Species: C. marmorata

Binomial name
- Clemensia marmorata (Schaus, 1896)

Synonyms
- Calligenia marmorata Schaus, 1896

Species of moth

Clemensia marmorata is a moth of the family Erebidae first described by William Schaus in 1896. It is found in Paraná, Brazil.
