= Holistic education =

Educational philosophy that seeks to develop the whole person

Holistic education is an educational philosophy that aims to develop the whole person: intellectually, emotionally, socially, physically, creatively, and spiritually. It is sometimes described in academic literature as holistic learning theory. The philosophy holds that learners find identity, meaning, and purpose through connections with their community, the natural world, and values such as compassion and peace.

Holistic education emphasises experiential learning, integrating multiple forms of knowledge, and the importance of relationships and human values within the learning environment. It is often considered a branch of alternative education, in contrast to mainstream educational research and evidence-based education approaches.

== Origins ==
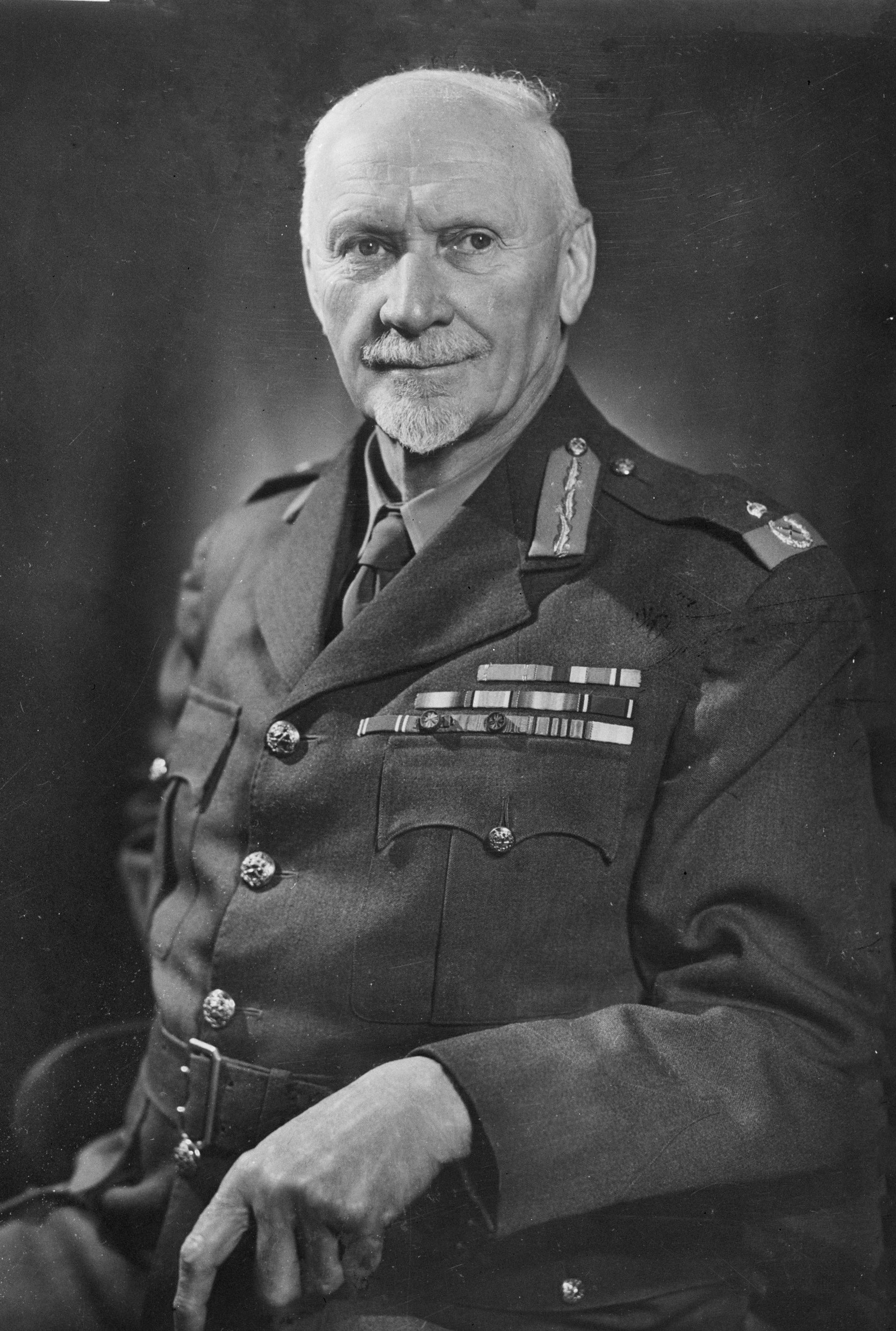
Jan Christiaan Smuts in 1947

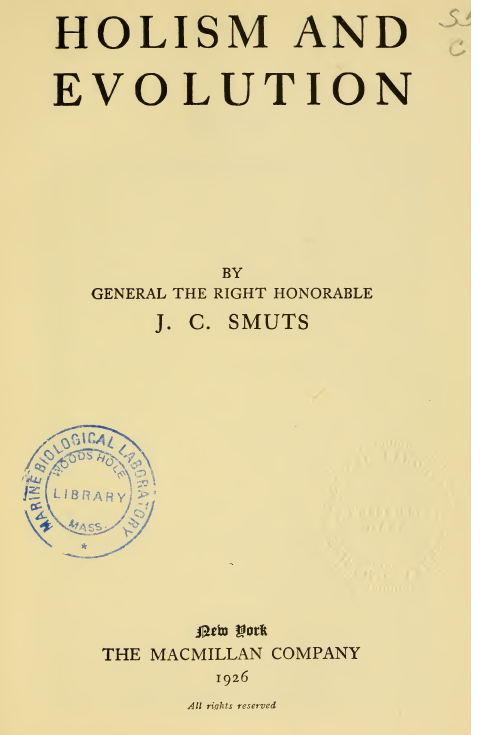
Title page of Holism and Evolution (1926)

The origins of holistic education have been linked to philosophical and cultural traditions that emphasised learning as a process of developing the whole person. Elements of holistic thinking appear in ancient Greece, where education was associated with cultivating both mind and body, and in many indigenous cultures, which integrated spiritual, community, and ecological dimensions into teaching and learning.

The modern term holism was introduced by South African statesman and philosopher Jan Smuts, whose 1926 book Holism and Evolution described nature as tending to form wholes greater than the sum of their parts. Smuts' theory of holism influenced later developments in systems thinking, ecology, psychology, and education.

Other early influences on holistic education included the philosophies of Johann Wolfgang von Goethe, whose ideas informed Rudolf Steiner's pedagogy, as well as the progressive educational theories of John Dewey and Maria Montessori. These thinkers emphasised the interconnectedness of knowledge, imagination, and experience in human development.

== Development ==
Although many ideas associated with holistic education trace back to earlier educational and philosophical traditions, the movement took explicit shape during the twentieth century. Early influences included the writings of Jean-Jacques Rousseau, Johann Heinrich Pestalozzi, Ralph Waldo Emerson, Henry David Thoreau, and Friedrich Fröbel, who emphasised natural development, self-expression, and learning through direct experience.

In the late nineteenth and early twentieth centuries, educators such as John Dewey, Maria Montessori, Francis Parker, Rudolf Steiner, and Francisco Ferrer advanced progressive and learner-centred approaches that integrated intellectual, emotional, and social growth.

The modern form of holistic education coalesced in the mid-twentieth century with the rise of humanistic psychology and educational reform. Thinkers including Abraham Maslow, Carl Rogers, Carl Jung, and Paulo Freire highlighted self-actualisation, learner-centred pedagogy, and education as a means of personal and social transformation.

The cultural shifts of the 1960s and 1970s, along with the growth of alternative schooling, brought greater visibility to holistic approaches. Conferences in the United States during the late 1970s, such as the National Holistic Education Conference, provided a platform for scholars and practitioners to articulate a shared philosophy. By the 1980s, holistic education had become an identifiable area of research and practice in North America, influencing both independent schools and teacher education programmes.

== Philosophy ==
Holistic education is grounded in the idea that learning should develop the whole person, intellectually, emotionally, socially, physically, artistically, creatively, and spiritually. It stresses interconnectedness, community, and intrinsic motivation, viewing education not only as preparation for work but also as a means of fostering meaning, purpose, and responsible citizenship.

Key influences on holistic education include:

- Humanistic psychology – Abraham Maslow's concept of self-actualization and Carl Rogers’ emphasis on learner-centred education shaped its focus on personal growth.
- Progressive education – John Dewey's philosophy of experiential learning and democracy in education contributed to its emphasis on participation and reflection.
- Multiple intelligences – Howard Gardner's theory broadened the understanding of intelligence beyond the purely academic to include emotional, social, and creative capacities.
- Critical pedagogy – Paulo Freire's call for education that empowers learners to question and transform their world reinforced the holistic emphasis on social and ethical responsibility.

Holistic philosophy also draws on spiritual and ecological perspectives, highlighting the relationship between people, communities, and the natural environment. In practice, this philosophy encourages schools to balance academic learning with opportunities for creativity, reflection, cooperation, and care for the environment.

== Applications in practice ==
Holistic principles have been applied in a variety of educational models around the world. Well-known examples include:

- Montessori education – developed by Maria Montessori, this model emphasises self-directed activity, hands-on learning, freedom of choice, and learning through movement and social interaction. Lillard has argued that these features align with research-based principles of how children learn.
- Waldorf education (or Steiner education) – based on the philosophy of Rudolf Steiner, it integrates academic, artistic, and practical skills with an emphasis on imagination and creativity in learning.
- Reggio Emilia approach – originating in Italy, this early childhood model focuses on project-based, experiential learning in which children are considered active participants in constructing knowledge.
- Forest Schools – which began in Scandinavia and developed in the United Kingdom in the 1990s, involve long-term, learner-centred outdoor sessions in woodland environments, designed to build resilience, confidence, and social competence alongside academic learning.
- Democratic schools – such as Sudbury model schools, which give students significant autonomy in decision-making and emphasise self-directed learning within a community.
- Friends schools (Quaker schools) – grounded in Quaker values, they stress equality, simplicity, peace, and community, and often incorporate reflective and experiential practices consistent with holistic education.
- Krishnamurti schools – founded on the teachings of Jiddu Krishnamurti, these schools promote inquiry-based learning and encourage students to understand themselves and their relationship with society and nature.

Holistic education principles are also present in some higher education programmes, especially in interdisciplinary liberal arts curricula that seek to integrate the sciences, humanities, and arts.

== Curriculum and practice ==
Holistic education does not prescribe a single curriculum but promotes approaches that recognise the learner as a whole person. Curricula inspired by holistic principles typically emphasise:

- Experiential learning: Hands-on, real-world activities are prioritised over rote memorisation, with an emphasis on reflection and meaning-making.
- Interconnected knowledge: Subjects are approached in an integrated or transdisciplinary way, avoiding rigid compartmentalisation. Learning often links science, arts, humanities, and social responsibility.
- Personal and social growth: Curricula include opportunities for students to develop emotional literacy, resilience, and interpersonal skills, often through cooperative projects and community-based learning.
- Creativity and aesthetics: Artistic expression and appreciation of beauty are considered integral to education, rather than supplementary.
- Spiritual and ethical dimensions: While not necessarily religious, holistic curricula often explore values such as compassion, interconnectedness, and environmental stewardship.

In practice, holistic approaches often use flexible pacing, mixed-age classrooms, and learner-initiated projects. Teachers act as facilitators rather than authority figures, encouraging students to take responsibility for their learning and to relate their studies to personal and community life.

Examples of holistic curriculum practices include project-based learning, community service programmes, outdoor and environmental education, and contemplative practices such as mindfulness.

== Teacher's role ==
In holistic education, teachers are regarded less as authoritative figures and more as facilitators of learning. Their role is to create environments where students can explore knowledge, relationships, and personal meaning, rather than simply transmitting information.

Holistic educators are expected to:

- Foster cooperation and community in the classroom, emphasising relationships over competition.
- Encourage reflection, self-awareness, and responsibility in learners.
- Support the development of multiple intelligences, including emotional, social, creative, and spiritual dimensions, alongside academic skills.
- Act as guides or mentors who help students connect learning to personal and community life.

Practical applications of this role vary across holistic education models. In Montessori education, teachers prepare a structured environment where children choose activities and work independently. In Waldorf education, teachers integrate artistic, practical, and intellectual work while fostering imagination. In the Forest School model, practitioners facilitate outdoor, learner-led experiences, supporting risk-taking, resilience, and ecological awareness within a framework of safety and reflection.

== See also ==
- Deschooling
- Holism
- Homeschooling
- Unschooling

=== School movements that incorporate elements ===
- Camphill Movement
- Democratic school
- Forest School
- Friends schools
- Krishnamurti Schools
- Montessori education
- Reggio Emilia approach
- Waldorf education
