= Clemensia barbotini =

Scientific classification
- Kingdom: Animalia
- Phylum: Arthropoda
- Clade: Pancrustacea
- Class: Insecta
- Order: Lepidoptera
- Superfamily: Noctuoidea
- Family: Erebidae
- Subfamily: Arctiinae
- Genus: Clemensia
- Species: C. barbotini

Binomial name
- Clemensia barbotini Gibeaux, 1983

Species of moth

Clemensia barbotini is a moth of the family Erebidae. It is found in French Guiana.
