= Chrysasura postvitreata =

Scientific classification
- Domain: Eukaryota
- Kingdom: Animalia
- Phylum: Arthropoda
- Class: Insecta
- Order: Lepidoptera
- Superfamily: Noctuoidea
- Family: Erebidae
- Subfamily: Arctiinae
- Genus: Chrysasura
- Species: C. postvitreata

Binomial name
- Chrysasura postvitreata (Rothschild, 1920)

Synonyms
- Asura postvitreata Rothschild, 1920

Species of moth

Chrysasura postvitreata is a moth of the family Erebidae. It is found on Sulawesi.
