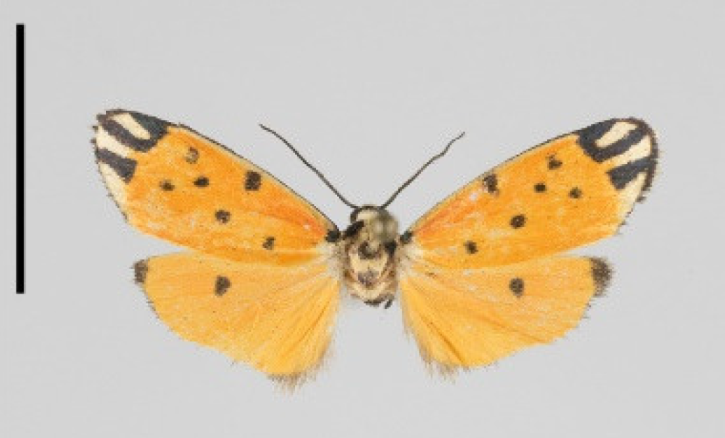

Scientific classification
- Domain: Eukaryota
- Kingdom: Animalia
- Phylum: Arthropoda
- Class: Insecta
- Order: Lepidoptera
- Superfamily: Noctuoidea
- Family: Erebidae
- Subfamily: Arctiinae
- Genus: Clemensia
- Species: C. domica

Binomial name
- Clemensia domica H. Druce

= Clemensia domica =

Species of moth

Clemensia domica is a moth of the family Erebidae first described by Herbert Druce. It is found in Ecuador.
