= Clemensia cernitis =

Scientific classification
- Domain: Eukaryota
- Kingdom: Animalia
- Phylum: Arthropoda
- Class: Insecta
- Order: Lepidoptera
- Superfamily: Noctuoidea
- Family: Erebidae
- Subfamily: Arctiinae
- Genus: Clemensia
- Species: C. cernitis

Binomial name
- Clemensia cernitis (H. Druce, 1897)

Synonyms
- Nola cernitis H. Druce, 1897

Species of moth

Clemensia cernitis is a moth of the family Erebidae first described by Herbert Druce in 1897. It is found in Mexico and Costa Rica.
