= Clemensia quinqueferana =

Scientific classification
- Kingdom: Animalia
- Phylum: Arthropoda
- Class: Insecta
- Order: Lepidoptera
- Superfamily: Noctuoidea
- Family: Erebidae
- Subfamily: Arctiinae
- Genus: Clemensia
- Species: C. quinqueferana

Binomial name
- Clemensia quinqueferana (Walker, 1863)

Synonyms
- Tospitis quinqueferana Walker, 1863; Clemensia quinquiferaria Dyar, 1914

Species of moth

Clemensia quinqueferana is a moth of the family Erebidae first described by Francis Walker in 1863. It is found in Mexico, Panama and Tefé, Brazil.
