= Clemensia parapatella =

Scientific classification
- Domain: Eukaryota
- Kingdom: Animalia
- Phylum: Arthropoda
- Class: Insecta
- Order: Lepidoptera
- Superfamily: Noctuoidea
- Family: Erebidae
- Subfamily: Arctiinae
- Genus: Clemensia
- Species: C. parapatella

Binomial name
- Clemensia parapatella (Dognin, 1899)

Synonyms
- Aemene parapatella Dognin, 1899; Clemensia parapahella

Species of moth

Clemensia parapatella is a moth of the family Erebidae first described by Paul Dognin in 1899. It is found in Ecuador.
