= Calyce fulva =

Scientific classification
- Domain: Eukaryota
- Kingdom: Animalia
- Phylum: Arthropoda
- Class: Insecta
- Order: Coleoptera
- Suborder: Polyphaga
- Infraorder: Cucujiformia
- Family: Mordellidae
- Genus: Calyce
- Species: C. fulva

Binomial name
- Calyce fulva Champion, 1891

Species of beetle

Calyce fulva is a species of beetle in the Calyce genus. It was discovered in 1891.
