= Clemensia plumbeifusca =

Scientific classification
- Kingdom: Animalia
- Phylum: Arthropoda
- Class: Insecta
- Order: Lepidoptera
- Superfamily: Noctuoidea
- Family: Erebidae
- Subfamily: Arctiinae
- Genus: Clemensia
- Species: C. plumbeifusca

Binomial name
- Clemensia plumbeifusca Hampson, 1918

Species of moth

Clemensia plumbeifusca is a moth of the family Erebidae. It is found in Peru.

The wingspan is about 18 mm. The forewings are dark brown, suffused with silvery blue-grey. There is an indistinctly double postmedial series of slight white points and a subterminal series of slight white points. The hindwings are dark brown suffused with silvery blue-grey.
