= Clemensia centralis =

Scientific classification
- Kingdom: Animalia
- Phylum: Arthropoda
- Class: Insecta
- Order: Lepidoptera
- Superfamily: Noctuoidea
- Family: Erebidae
- Subfamily: Arctiinae
- Genus: Clemensia
- Species: C. centralis

Binomial name
- Clemensia centralis Hampson, 1900

Species of moth

Clemensia centralis is a moth of the family Erebidae first described by George Hampson in 1900. It is found in Guatemala and Panama.
