= Clemensia russata =

Scientific classification
- Kingdom: Animalia
- Phylum: Arthropoda
- Class: Insecta
- Order: Lepidoptera
- Superfamily: Noctuoidea
- Family: Erebidae
- Subfamily: Arctiinae
- Genus: Clemensia
- Species: C. russata

Binomial name
- Clemensia russata Hampson, 1900

Synonyms
- Clemensia infuscata Draudt, 1919; Clemensia nigriplaga Draudt, 1919

Species of moth

Clemensia russata is a moth of the family Erebidae first described by George Hampson in 1900. It is found in Costa Rica.
