= Clemensia rosacea =

Scientific classification
- Domain: Eukaryota
- Kingdom: Animalia
- Phylum: Arthropoda
- Class: Insecta
- Order: Lepidoptera
- Superfamily: Noctuoidea
- Family: Erebidae
- Subfamily: Arctiinae
- Genus: Clemensia
- Species: C. rosacea

Binomial name
- Clemensia rosacea Reich, 1933

Species of moth

Clemensia rosacea is a moth of the family Erebidae. It is found in Brazil.
