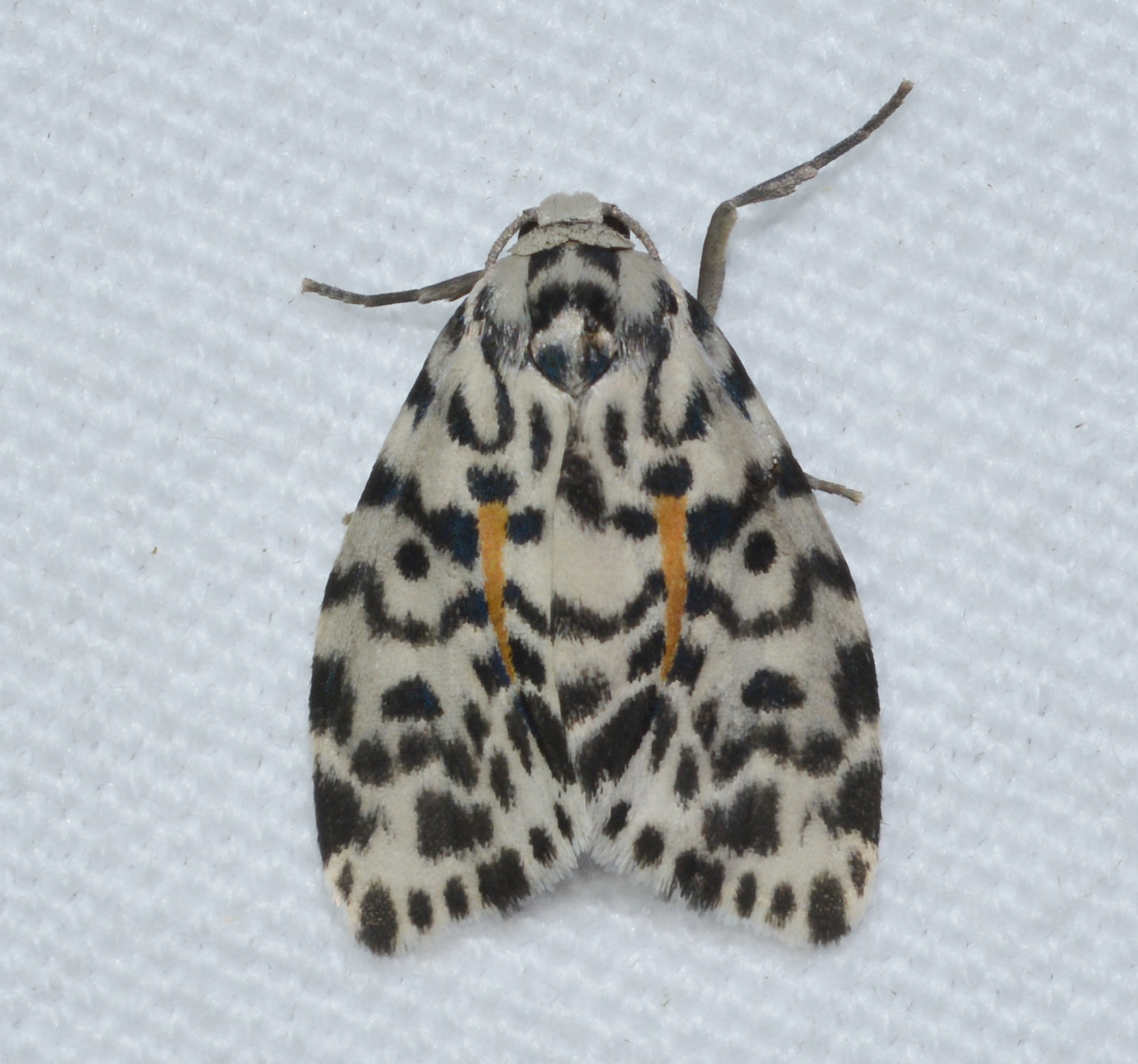
- Clemensia leopardina

Scientific classification
- Kingdom: Animalia
- Phylum: Arthropoda
- Clade: Pancrustacea
- Class: Insecta
- Order: Lepidoptera
- Superfamily: Noctuoidea
- Family: Erebidae
- Subfamily: Arctiinae
- Subtribe: Cisthenina
- Genus: Clemensia; Packard, 1864

Synonyms
- Uxia Walker, 1866; Repa Walker, 1866

= Clemensia =

Genus of moths

Clemensia is a genus of moths in the family Erebidae. The genus was described by Packard in 1864.

== Species ==
- Clemensia abnormis
- Clemensia acroperalis
- Clemensia albata
- Clemensia alembis
- Clemensia barbotini
- Clemensia brunneomedia
- Clemensia centralis
- Clemensia cernitis
- Clemensia chala
- Clemensia cincinnata
- Clemensia clathrata
- Clemensia distincta
- Clemensia domica
- Clemensia erminea
- Clemensia flava
- Clemensia holocerna
- Clemensia incerta
- Clemensia inleis
- Clemensia lacteata
- Clemensia leisova
- Clemensia leopardina
- Clemensia leucogramma
- Clemensia maculata
- Clemensia marmorata
- Clemensia mesomima
- Clemensia mucida
- Clemensia nigrolineata
- Clemensia nubila
- Clemensia ochracea
- Clemensia ophrydina
- Clemensia panthera
- Clemensia parapatella
- Clemensia philodena
- Clemensia plumbeifusca
- Clemensia pontenova
- Clemensia quinqueferana
- Clemensia remida
- Clemensia reticulata
- Clemensia rosacea
- Clemensia roseata
- Clemensia russata
- Clemensia subleis
- Clemensia toulgoeti
- Clemensia urucata
