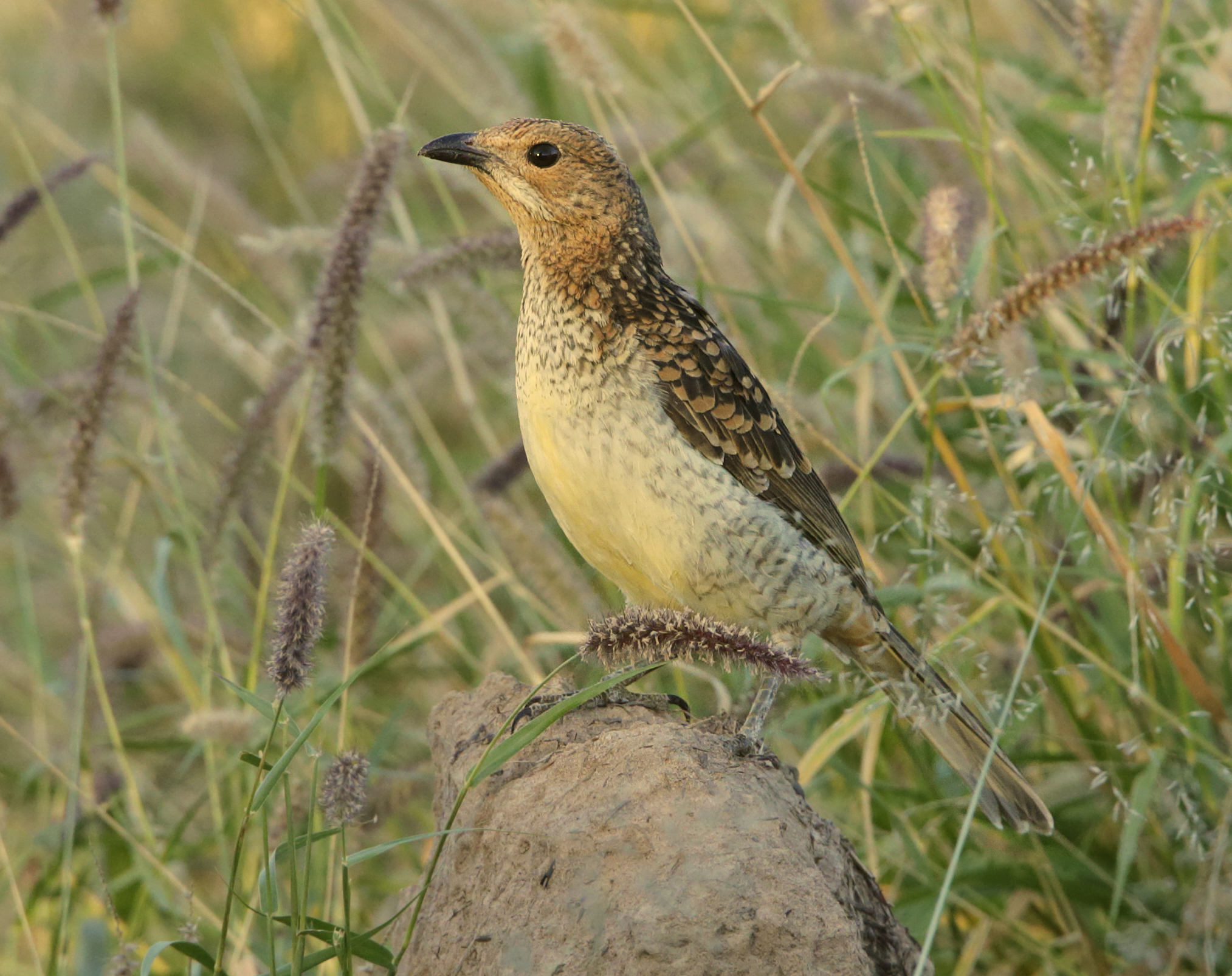

Conservation status
- Least Concern (IUCN 3.1)

Scientific classification
- Kingdom: Animalia
- Phylum: Chordata
- Class: Aves
- Order: Passeriformes
- Family: Ptilonorhynchidae
- Genus: Chlamydera
- Species: C. maculata

Binomial name
- Chlamydera maculata (Gould, 1837)
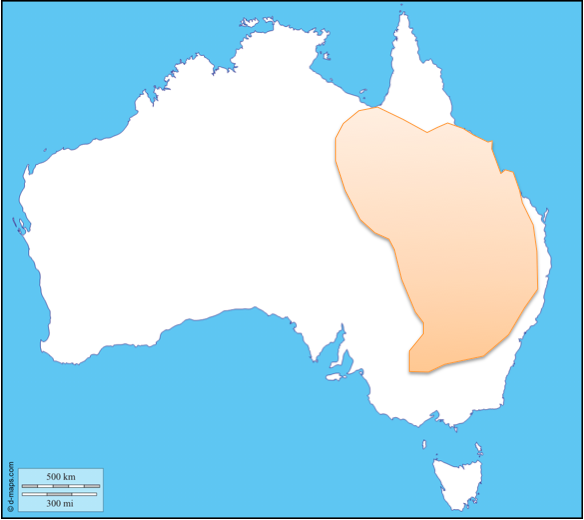
- Distribution of the spotted bowerbird

Synonyms
- large-frilled bowerbird, cabbage-bird or mimic-bird.

= Spotted bowerbird =

Species of bird

The spotted bowerbird (Chlamydera maculata) is a sedentary, mid-sized passerine found across broad parts of the drier habitats of eastern Australia. The species is known for its remarkable behaviours, like many other bowerbirds (Ptilonorynchidae), which include bower building and decorating, courtship displays and vocal mimicry. Spotted bowerbirds are locally common, however, overall the population is thought to be in decline.

== Description ==
At 29 cm in length, spotted bowerbirds are intermediate in size among the bowerbirds, but are rather slim and compact. Spotted bowerbirds are sexually monomorphic, with a pale rufous head that is streaked with grey-brown and a nape adorned with a lilac-pink crest. The upperparts are blackish-brown and marked extensively with amber spots, while the paler underparts are cream with greyish scalloping and barring and a slightly yellow shade to the lower belly and undertail. The bill is black, the eyes dark brown and the legs olive-brown.

Spotted bowerbirds have a diverse range of vocalisations. Typical calls include loud, harsh churrings and other notes, as well as the complex vocal mimicry characteristic of grey bowerbirds. Spotted bowerbirds are accomplished vocal mimics and have been known to simulate the calls of many birds as well as other sounds. When approached by humans or other potential threats, males at bowers and females at nests often mimic the calls of predatory birds such as the wedge-tailed eagle (Aquila audax), blue-winged kookaburra (Dacelo leachii), grey-crowned babbler (Pomatostomus temporalis), grey butcherbird (Cracticus torquatus), pied butcherbird (Cracticus nigrogularis), Australian magpie (Gymnorhina tibicen), Australian raven (Corvus coronoides), apostlebird (Struthidea cinerea) and honeyeaters (Meliphagidae spp.) among others. Other sounds mimicked include large herbivores moving through scrub or over fallen branches, the twang of fence wire, wood chopping, the crack of stock whip and the whistling flight of crested pigeons.

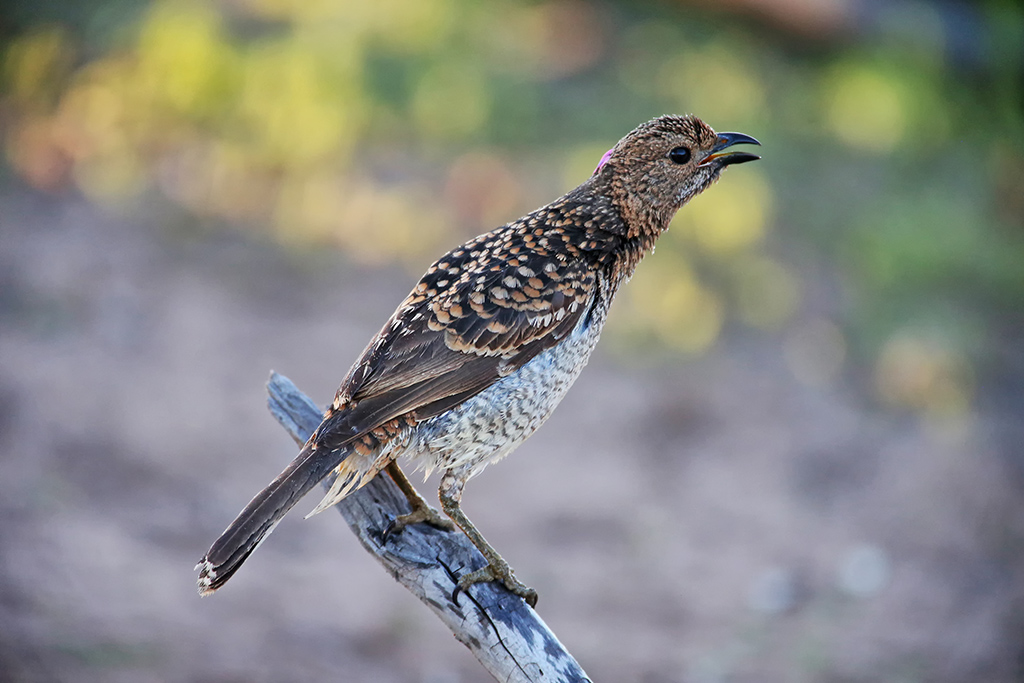
Spotted bowerbird

== Taxonomy and systematics ==
First described by John Gould as Ptilonorynchus maculata, then later changed to Chlamydodera occipitalis, it was again changed to Chlamydera maculata, which is the currently accepted name by most taxonomic authorities (e.g. the IOC World Bird List, Birdlife International, and the Clements list,). Molecular studies by Kusmierski et al. lead Christidis and Boles to merge the genus Chlamydera with Ptilonorynchus, leading to the current alternative name of Ptilonorynchus maculatus. See bowerbirds for higher systematics. Spotted bowerbird was formerly considered conspecific with the western bowerbird (Chlamydera guttata), until the latter was defined as a separate species by Gould in 1862. The spotted bowerbird is a monotypic species with no subspecies described.

== Habitat ==
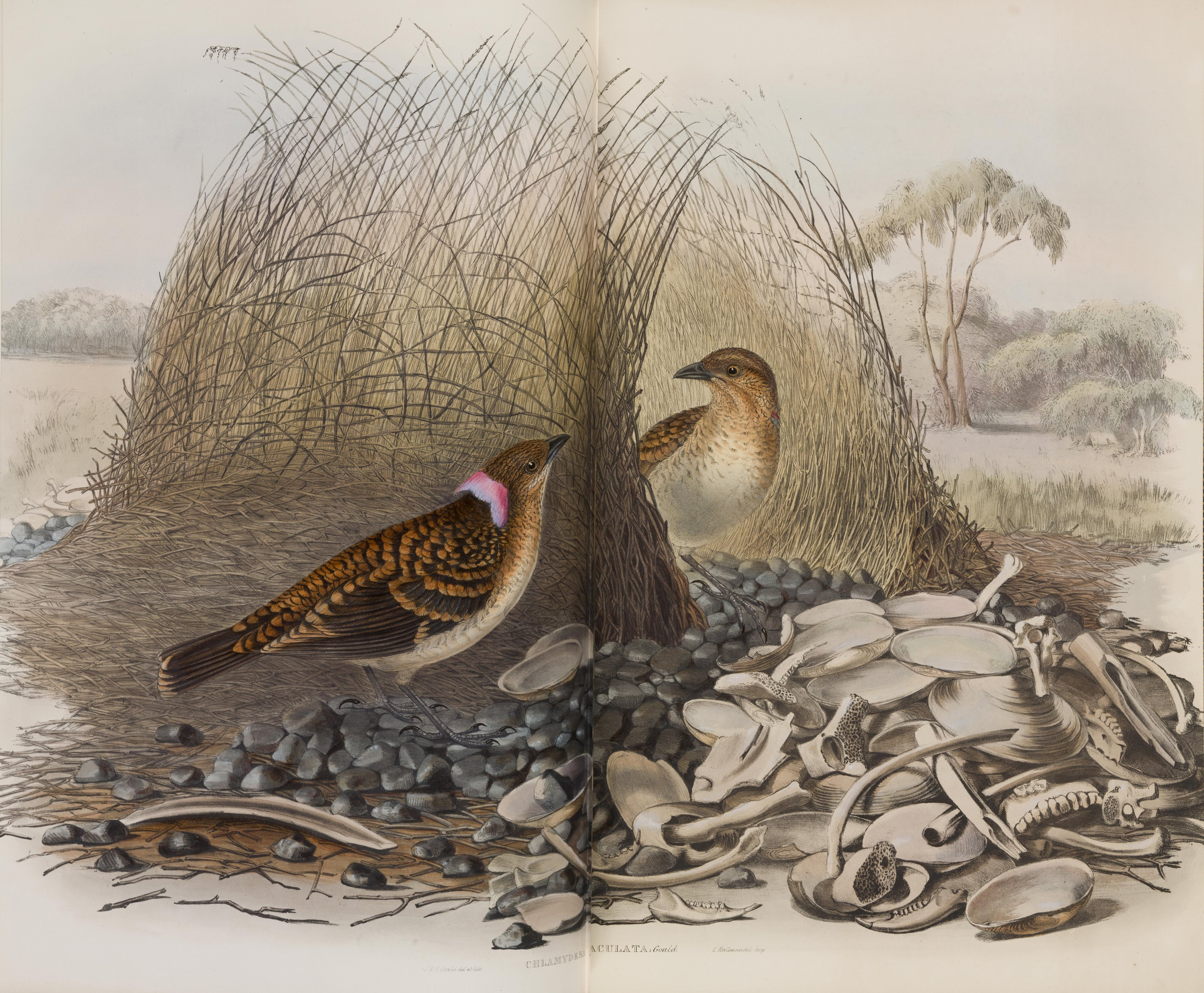
Male and female birds near a bower, picture from The Birds of Australia, 1848

Spotted bowerbirds occur most commonly in dry, open sclerophyll woodlands with dense understories of small trees and shrubs, where their plumage becomes cryptic. They show particular preference for habitats dominated by eucalypt spp. (Eucalyptus) and/or brigalow (Acacia harpophylla) and have strong associations with riverine woodlands. Spotted bowerbirds often inhabit orchards, parks and are known to frequent rural homesteads and gardens.

== Food ==
The diet of spotted bowerbirds consists mostly of fruit, flowers, and seeds, but arthropods are also consumed. They are also known to take food scraps from campsites and houses and raid orchards and gardens for fruit. Spotted bowerbirds usually forage alone or in small groups but are sometimes seen in flocks of 10-30 birds when not attending nests and bowers.

== Behaviour ==
=== Breeding ===
The extended breeding occurs between July and March, with most eggs laid between October and February.

==== Bowers ====
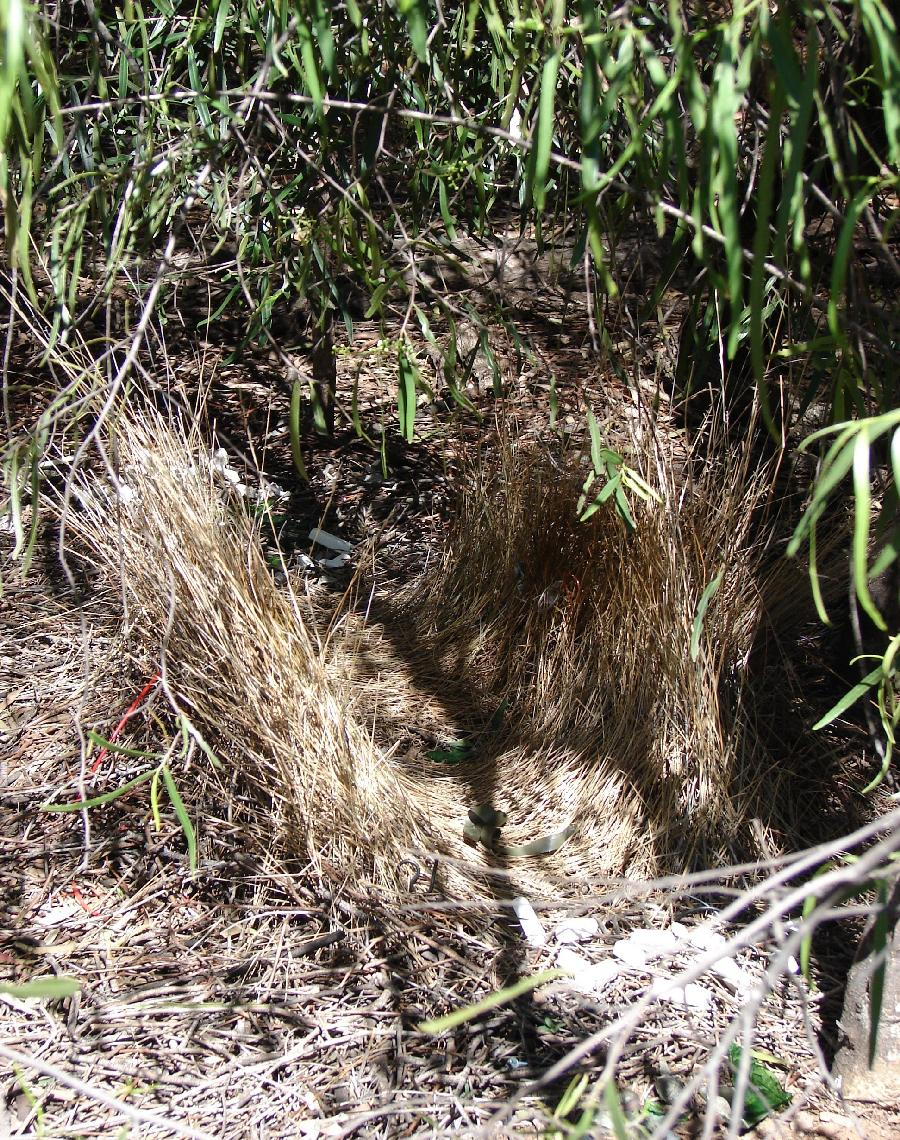
Bower of a spotted bowerbird

Like most bowerbirds, Spotted bowerbirds are polygynous and males build and maintain bowers and display courts. These serve as a focal point for many social activities and are thought to act as an indicator of male quality for potential mates. Spotted bowerbirds build avenue-bowers of grass and twigs, that are wider than many other avenue-building bowerbirds. Males may paint the walls of bowers using masticated grass and saliva. Bowers are generally built under large, thorny bushes that provide shelter and fruit. Some bower sites, known as traditional sites, may be retained for upwards of 20 years; and rebuilt each year by a number of males in successive years.

==== Display courts ====
Display courts are located immediately adjacent to bowers and are decorated with leaves, flowers, fruits, seed pods, insect frass and exuviae, shells, eggshells, bones, stones and charcoal. Man-made objects are also frequently used to decorate bower sites including glass, wire, foil and other metal objects. The number and types of decorations are linked to the mating success of males, suggesting that decorations also play a role in mate choice by females. The types of decorations preferred by spotted bowerbirds vary geographically, which may indicate that females prefer males that collect an assortment of items, depending on their location.

==== Courtship display ====
Once females have been attracted to bowers successfully, males perform elaborate courtship displays that consist of central and peripheral displays, with vocalisations being made throughout. Uniquely to spotted bowerbirds, the females watch the energetic display through the partially transparent northern wall of the bower.

- Central displays are performed in the immediate vicinity of the bower and involve upright posture, raised wings and presentation of the retractile lilac-pink nuchal crest, which is larger in bower-owning males. During this phase, movements are jerky, erratic and strained.

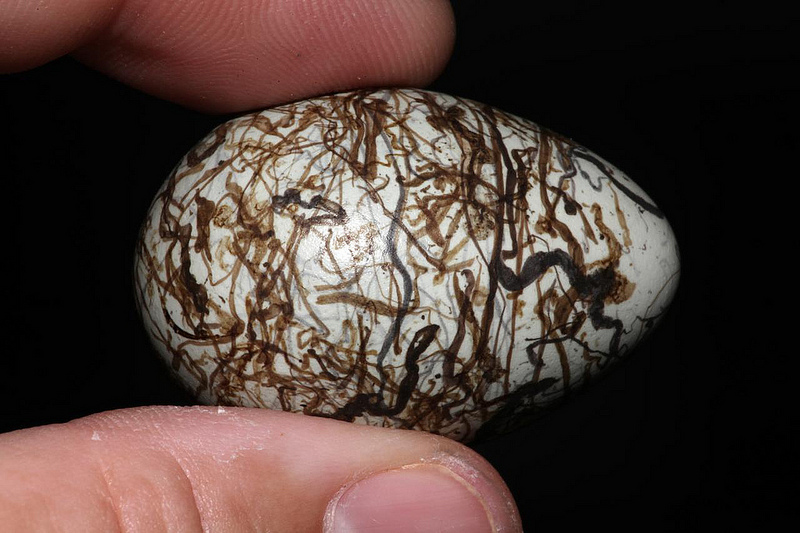
Spotted bowerbird egg

- Peripheral displays consist of males walking around their bower in wide circles with a raised head, open beak, cocked tail and drooped wings. Males often use decorations as props during display, either holding them in their bills or picking them up and aggressively throwing them down. Courtship displays can last minutes or sometimes more than an hour.

==== Nesting ====
Like most bowerbirds, males take no part in parental care. Females build nests in trees and bushes, but also occasionally in mistletoes (Loranthaceae) an average of 6m above the ground. Nests consist of an eggcup of fine twiglets built on a foundation of larger sticks and twigs. Clutches are usually a single egg that is oval shaped and pale greenish-grey with strong vermiculations of dark brown and black. Incubation and nestling periods remain unknown for this species.

== Conservation status ==
Spotted bowerbirds are listed as least concern by the IUCN Red List and are locally common, however, overall the species is thought to be in decline. Local extinctions are common across much of its range, particularly in the southwest. The species is now extinct in South Australia, where it formerly had a small range, and is listed under the Victorian Flora and Fauna Guarantee Act 1988. Drivers of this decline may be illegal shooting and poisoning by humans who consider them a pest, predation by introduced species such as feral cats (Felis catus) and red foxes (Vulpes vulpes) and habitat clearing and modification leading to fragmentation.
