= Chrysasura meeki =

Scientific classification
- Domain: Eukaryota
- Kingdom: Animalia
- Phylum: Arthropoda
- Class: Insecta
- Order: Lepidoptera
- Superfamily: Noctuoidea
- Family: Erebidae
- Subfamily: Arctiinae
- Genus: Chrysasura
- Species: C. meeki

Binomial name
- Chrysasura meeki Rothschild, 1916

Synonyms
- Chrysasura meeki ab. maculata Rothschild

Species of moth

Chrysasura meeki is a moth of the family Erebidae first described by Walter Rothschild in 1916. It is found in New Guinea.

== Subspecies ==
- Chrysasura meeki meeki
- Chrysasura meeki wollastoni Rothschild, 1915
