= Clonlara School =

Coordinates: 42°15′15.2″N 83°43′52.5″W

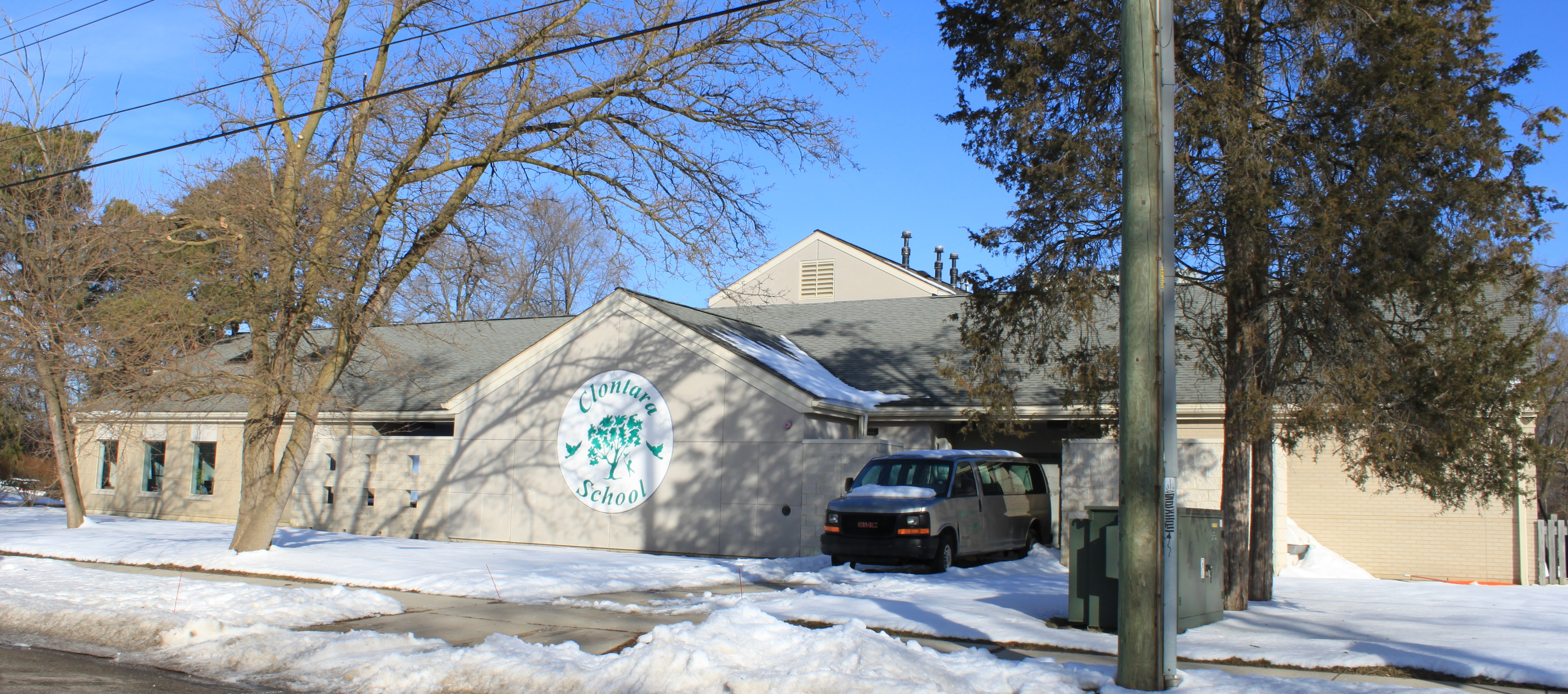

Location
- 1289 Jewett; Ann Arbor, Michigan 48104; United States

Information
- School type: Private School, Alternative School, Home Based Education Program (HBEP)
- Established: 1967
- Founder: Pat Montgomery
- CEEB code: 230-082
- Grades: K–12
- Website: www.clonlara.org

Clonlara School is private alternative school located in Ann Arbor, Michigan, United States.

== History ==
Clonlara was founded by Pat Montgomery in 1967 as a private day school. Pat was instrumental in fighting for homeschooling rights in Michigan.

== Home schooling program ==
The school offers an online program for home schooled students. As of 2023, about 2000 students are enrolled in Clonlara’s online program, with additional students attending the campus in Ann Arbor.

== See also ==
- Alternative school
