= Reggio Children Foundation =

Reggio Emilia approach foundation

Reggio Children Foundation – Loris Malaguzzi Centre
- Founded: 2011
- Type: Not-for-profit participatory foundation
- Purpose: research into education, especially preschool education and early childhood education
- Location: Reggio Emilia, Italy
- Coordinates: 44.70082°N 10.6445°E
- Region served: Global
- Key people: Francesco Profumo, President; Annamaria Contini, Director of the Education and Human Sciences Department of UNIMORE; Margie Keith Cooper, Co-President of NAREA (North America Reggio Emilia Alliance); Serena Foracchia, Responsible for Reggio Emilia, Parma and Piacenza - Demetra Srl; Harold Valdemar Gothson, Senior Consultant of REI (Reggio Emilia Institutet); Giuseppe Zizzo, Head of Medical Operations - Diaverum Italia
- Website: https://frchildren.org/en

The Reggio Children Foundation – Loris Malaguzzi Centre (Fondazione Reggio Children Centro Loris Malaguzzi) is an international nonprofit foundation for the promotion of the Reggio Emilia approach around the world. The foundation, which is based in Reggio Emilia, Emilia-Romagna, Italy, was launched in September 2011, and is dedicated to the memory of Loris Malaguzzi, who developed the Reggio Emilia approach.

NGOs and/or cooperatives constitute most of the founding partners of the foundation: North American Reggio Emilia Alliance (NAREA; North America), Reggio Emilia Institutet (Sweden), Red Solare Argentina, Cooperativa Italiana di Ristorazione (CIR; Italy), Cooperativa Sociale Coopselios (Italy), and Fondazione Manodori (Italy). Other partners are EFFE 2005 Gruppo Feltrinelli S.p.A., a private holding company for laeffe (an Italian television channel owned by the Feltrinelli media group), and the municipal/city council of Reggio Emilia (Comune di Reggio Emilia).

== History ==
Fondazione Reggio Children was established in 2011 in Reggio Emilia, the city that, immediately after the Second World War, has given birth to the Reggio Emilia Approach®, the educational approach based on the idea of children and human beings as holders of rights and potentials.

In 1963 the first municipal preschool, the Robinson Municipal Preschool, was founded in Reggio Emilia.
In 1971 the first municipal Infant-toddler centre, Centre Cervi, was founded in Reggio Emilia.
In 1991 Newsweek recognized Reggio Emilia's Municipality preschools as the “most beautiful in the world” for their pedagogy, amongst the most advanced at international level.
In 1994 Reggio Children Srl was established as an affiliate company of the Municipality with a large shareholder group, and the Friends of Reggio Children International Association was founded thanks to the participation of the volunteers supporting it.
In 1996 Remida, the Creative Recycling Centre, was founded in Reggio Emilia: over the years it has inspired a network of other Remida centres in Italy and around the world.
In 2003 Preschools and Infant-toddler Centres – Institution of the Municipality of Reggio Emilia was established as an instrumentality of the Municipality.
In 2011 Fondazione Reggio Children, which holds 46% of Reggio Children Srl, resulted from the transformation of the Friends of Reggio Children International Association.
In 2012 the Loris Malaguzzi International Centre was completed.
In 2017 Pause – Atelier dei sapori Srl became an affiliate company of Fondazione Reggio Children, which is its sole shareholder.
In 2020 the Bylaws were adapted so that Fondazione could be considered an E.T.S (Third Sectory Body); In this year Fondazione also renewed its visual identity.

== Research ==
The foundation states that its mission and aims include:

- Participation and common good: according to Fondazione Reggio Children, it is a right of human beings to be socially represented, to be recognised, at any age, as constructors of culture, active subjects in the dynamics of social construction of the community.
- Contexts and technologies in learning processes: in the educational experience of Reggio Emilia the encounter between pedagogy and architecture has supported the design and creation of environments and spaces conceived as educational interlocutors, offering children and adults experiences of play, discovery, and research.
- Education and politics: according to Fondazione Reggio Children, education is understood as a place of encounter, interaction and connections among the citizens of a community, and therefore a political place par excellence.
- Play and learning: in the research activities promoted by Fondazione, the importance of the playful dimension in learning processes is becoming increasingly evident. Various projects of Fondazione offer contexts in which the expressive potential of play relates to various aspects of everyday children's and adults’ life.
- Sustainability: according to Fondazione, sustainability takes into account not only the environmental but also the economic and social dimension in a systemic and synergistic relationship.
- Taste and wellbeing: to promote the right to wellbeing, Fondazione Reggio Children has set up a permanent research lab on topics such as food, food culture, and taste in children and adults.

There are three major projects/foci of the foundation.

- Remida: promoting both the collection, organisation and distribution of materials discarded by manufacturing businesses – and a culture of creative re-use of discarded materials; (The name is a play on words in Italian: "RE" is the initials of Reggio Emilia, mida means "gives me" and Re Mida is also Italian for "King Midas".)
- Educa: (Italian: "educates") a joint project with the European Union, promoting the role of the community in improving the quality of education for children aged from three to 14 years, and;
- The Loris Malaguzzi Award, which recognises contributions to the promotion of the Reggio Emilia approach, the thought of Loris Malaguzzi, and/or children's education in general.
