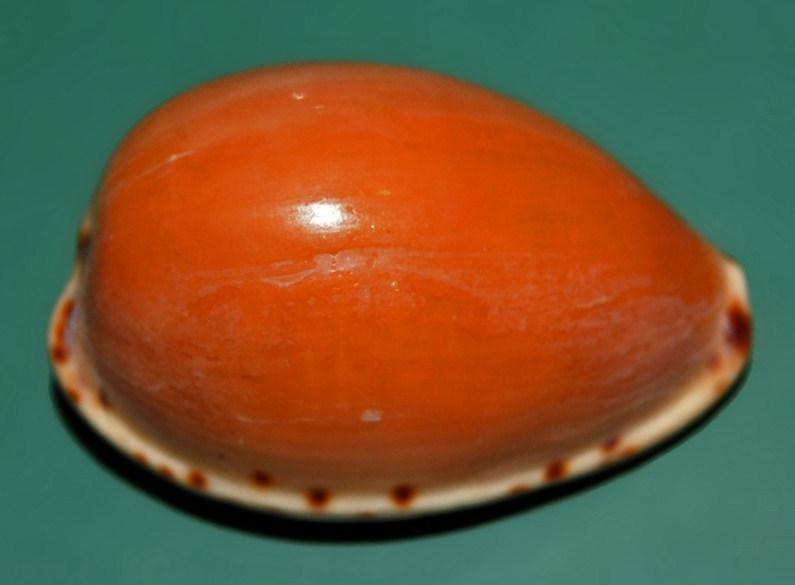
- A dorsal view of the shell of Notocypraea angustata

Scientific classification
- Kingdom: Animalia
- Phylum: Mollusca
- Class: Gastropoda
- Subclass: Caenogastropoda
- Order: Littorinimorpha
- Family: Cypraeidae
- Genus: Notocypraea
- Species: N. angustata

Binomial name
- Notocypraea angustata Gmelin, 1791

Synonyms
- Cypraea angustata Gmelin, 1791; Cypraea angustata globosa Vayssière, 1910; Cypraea angustata var. albata Beddome, 1898; Cypraea castanea Anderson, 1836; Cypraea maculata Perry, 1811; Erronea angustata (Gmelin, 1791); Notocypraea bicolor emblema Iredale, 1931; Notocypraea verconis Cotton & Godfrey, 1932; Thelxinovum molleri Iredale, 1931

= Notocypraea angustata =

Species of gastropod

Notocypraea angustata is a species of sea snail, a cowry, a marine gastropod mollusk in the family Cypraeidae, the cowries.

== Distribution ==
This species and its subspecies occur in the seas along southern Australia.
