= Vancouver Waldorf School =

School in British Columbia, Canada

Coordinates: 49.3339°N 123.0465°W

Information
- Established: 1971
- Grades: Daycare, Preschool, K-8

The Vancouver Waldorf School is an independent Waldorf school with preschool, kindergarten and grades 1 to 8. The administrative offices, early childhood centre, and grade school are located at 2725 St Christophers Road in North Vancouver, British Columbia. The Deer Fern Daycare is in Moodyville. The curriculum includes an emphasis on experiential learning and classrooms are screen-free.

The school is a member of the Association of Waldorf Schools of North America.

== See also ==
- Waldorf education
- Curriculum of the Waldorf schools
