= Lauremont School =

Location
- 8569 Bayview Avenue (Lower School) 500 Elgin Mills Road East (Upper School); Richmond Hill, Ontario; Canada; 43.841535°N 79.405725°W

Information
- School type: Private
- Founded: 1961
- Principal: Andrew Cross
- Schedule type: Block, 6-period
- Hours in school day: 7
- Programs: University Preparation, International Baccalaureate
- Website: Official website

Lauremont School, formerly Toronto Montessori Schools (TMS), is a Montessori and International Baccalaureate school in Ontario, Canada. It was founded by Helma Trass in 1961. The school moved to Richmond Hill from Toronto in 1964. It has two sites, Bayview Campus (18 months to Grade 6 students) and Elgin Mills Campus (Grades 7 to 12). The head of school is Andrew Cross. The school's first location was in Toronto, which is why, despite now being in Richmond Hill, it maintained its name 'Toronto Montessori Schools' until the rebranding in 2024.

The Toronto Montessori Institute (TMI) opened in 1971 at Victoria College, University of Toronto and moved to Richmond Hill in 1980. TMI has closed as of June 30, 2022.

The Lauremont Lower School is at 8569 Bayview Avenue and is for students aged 18 months to Grade 6. The Lauremont Upper School, which opened in September 2009, is an International Baccalaureate (IB) facility for students in TMS Upper School (Grades 7 to 12) – an IB World School with both the IB Middle Years Programme and the IB Diploma Programme. Also located at the Lower School address is the Toronto Montessori Institute (TMI), founded in 1971 and one of the oldest teacher-training Montessori schools in Canada.

TMS announced in May 2023 its intention to change its name to Lauremont School in September of the 2024-2025 school year. The "Laure" part of the new name stands for Baccalaureate, and "mont" for Montessori. The name change was completed in September 2024.
