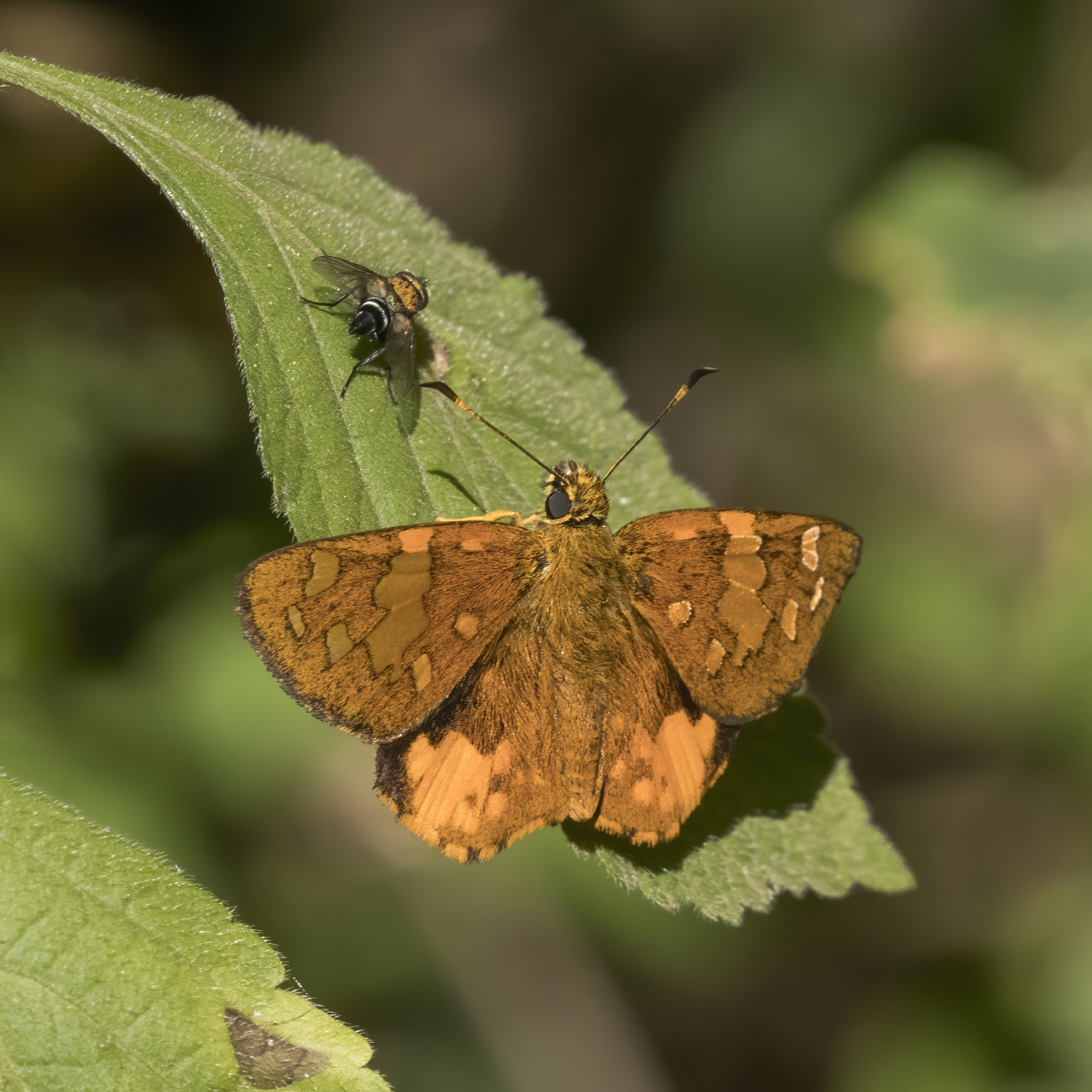
- Harenna Forest, Ethiopia

Scientific classification
- Kingdom: Animalia
- Phylum: Arthropoda
- Class: Insecta
- Order: Lepidoptera
- Family: Hesperiidae
- Genus: Celaenorrhinus
- Species: C. galenus

Binomial name
- Celaenorrhinus galenus (Fabricius, 1793)

Synonyms
- List: Hesperia galenus Fabricius, 1793; Pardaleodes fulgens Mabille, 1877; Coladenia maculata Hampson, 1891; Plesioneura hoehneli Rogenhofer, 1891; Celaenorrhinus opalinus Butler, 1901; Celaenorrhinus galenus var. alluaudi Mabille & Boullet, 1916; Celaenorrhinus opalinus var. jeanneli Mabille & Boullet, 1916; Celaenorrhinus bryki Aurivillius, 1925; Plesioneura biseriata Butler, 1888

= Celaenorrhinus galenus =

Species of butterfly

Celaenorrhinus galenus, also known as the common orange sprite, is a species of butterfly in the family Hesperiidae. It is found in Senegal, Guinea, Sierra Leone, Liberia, Ivory Coast, Ghana, Togo, Nigeria, from Cameroon to Ethiopia and to Tanzania, Malawi, Zambia, Angola, Mozambique and Zimbabwe. The habitat consists of forests.

Adults of both sexes feed from flowers growing low down along forest paths, including those of Ipomoea palmata. They are on wing from September onwards, becoming commoner in late autumn. There are two generations per year.

The larvae feed on Clerodendrum paniculatum, Hypoestes and Justicia species.

== Subspecies ==
- Celaenorrhinus galenus galenus - from Senegal, Guinea, Sierra Leone, Liberia, Ivory Coast, Ghana, Togo, Nigeria and Cameroon to the equatorial zone
- Celaenorrhinus galenus biseriata (Butler, 1888) - eastern Kenya, north-eastern Tanzania, Malawi, eastern Zimbabwe
