= Calyce maculata =

Scientific classification
- Kingdom: Animalia
- Phylum: Arthropoda
- Class: Insecta
- Order: Coleoptera
- Suborder: Polyphaga
- Infraorder: Cucujiformia
- Family: Mordellidae
- Genus: Calyce
- Species: C. maculata

Binomial name
- Calyce maculata Píc, 1911

Species of beetle

Calyce maculata is a species of beetle in the Calyce genus. It was discovered in 1911.
