= Clemensia maculata =

Scientific classification
- Domain: Eukaryota
- Kingdom: Animalia
- Phylum: Arthropoda
- Class: Insecta
- Order: Lepidoptera
- Superfamily: Noctuoidea
- Family: Erebidae
- Subfamily: Arctiinae
- Genus: Clemensia
- Species: C. maculata

Binomial name
- Clemensia maculata (Rothschild, 1912)

Synonyms
- Disoidemata maculata Rothschild, 1912

Species of moth

Clemensia maculata is a moth of the family Erebidae. It is found in Peru.
