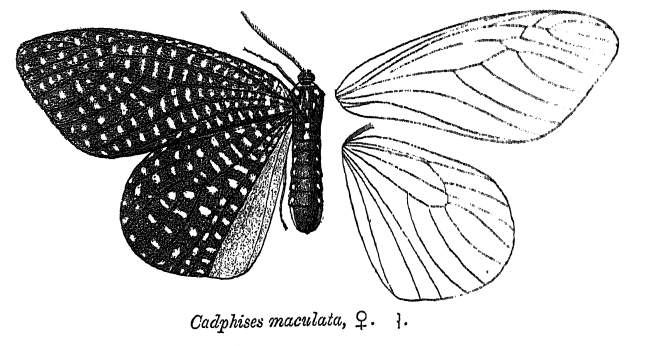

Scientific classification
- Domain: Eukaryota
- Kingdom: Animalia
- Phylum: Arthropoda
- Class: Insecta
- Order: Lepidoptera
- Family: Zygaenidae
- Genus: Cadphises
- Species: C. maculata

Binomial name
- Cadphises maculata Moore, 1865

= Cadphises maculata =

Species of moth

Cadphises maculata is a moth of the family Zygaenidae. It is known from Northeast India.

The wingspan for males is 62–64 mm (2.4–2.5 in) and for females 75 mm (3.0 in).
