= Loris Malaguzzi =

Italian educationist (1920–1994)

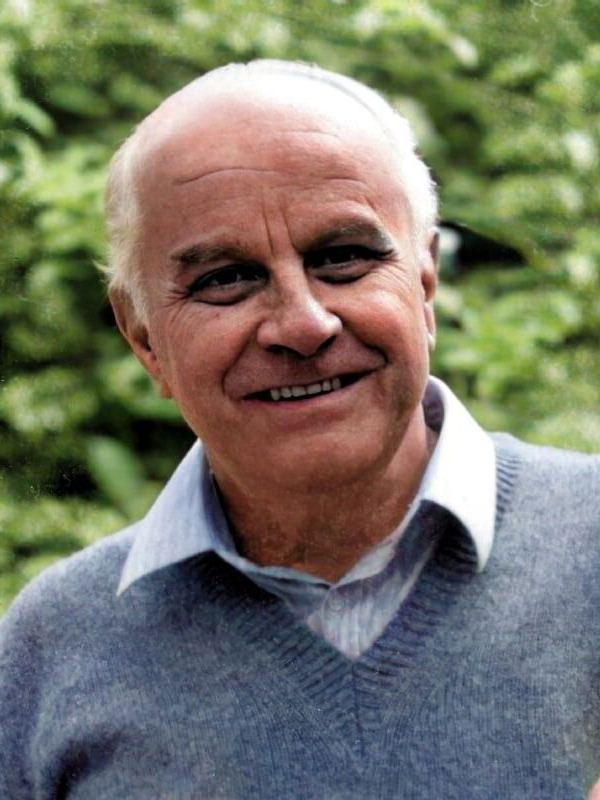
- Born: Loris Malaguzzi; February 23, 1920; Correggio, Italy
- Died: January 30, 1994 (aged 73); Reggio Emilia, Italy
- Education: University of Urbino
- Known for: Reggio Emilia Approach
- Scientific career
- Fields: Education, Psychology
- Workplaces: Municipality of Reggio Emilia, Reggio Emilia Psycho-Pedagogical Medical Centre

Loris Malaguzzi (February 23, 1920 – January 30, 1994) was an Italian educator and psychologist, best known as the founder of the Reggio Emilia approach to early childhood education. He advocated for recognizing children as individuals with rights and potential, emphasizing their active participation in learning processes and the development of creative expression.

== Early life and education ==
Malaguzzi was born in Correggio, Italy, on February 23, 1920, and spent his youth in Reggio Emilia. During World War II, he pursued his studies amidst the changing social structures influenced by the war. In 1946, he graduated with a degree in pedagogy from the University of Urbino.

In 1945, he witnessed a group of women initiating the construction of a school in a war-torn village. Moved by their determination, he joined their efforts. This initiative laid the foundation for what would later become the Reggio Emilia approach.

In the 1950s, Malaguzzi worked as a psychologist at the Psycho-Pedagogical Medical Centre affiliated with the Municipality of Reggio Emilia. There, he focused on children with learning difficulties, developing an educational philosophy that prioritized individual differences.

== Reggio Emilia approach ==
Malaguzzi's Reggio Emilia approach views children as curious, creative, and competent individuals. He believed that children should play an active role in their learning, expressing their ideas through multiple forms of communication. Education, in this context, is built upon trusting the child's potential and supporting it through various means.

Learning, according to this approach, is a dynamic process involving interaction among children, teachers, families, and the physical environment. It is not an isolated activity but a collaborative journey enriched by community engagement. The environment itself is considered the "third teacher" playing a crucial role in the educational experience.

Key principles of the Reggio Emilia approach include:

The Hundred Languages of Children: Emphasizing that children express themselves in myriad ways—through speech, art, movement, and more.

Environment as the Third Teacher: Designing spaces that encourage exploration and interaction.

Documentation: Recording children's thoughts and processes to make learning visible and to inform teaching strategies.

Atelier and Guidance: Integrating artistic exploration into learning, guided by specialized educators known as atelieristas.

== Death and legacy ==
Loris Malaguzzi died on January 30, 1994, in Reggio Emilia. In his honor, the Loris Malaguzzi International Centre was established to promote, research, and disseminate the principles of the Reggio Emilia approach.

== See also ==
- Reggio Emilia approach
- Early childhood education
- Constructivism (philosophy of education)
