= List of democratic schools =

This is a list of some of the current and former democratic schools around the world. This list also includes sub-branches of democratic schools such as Sudbury schools inspired by the Sudbury Valley School and certain anarchistic free schools that align with the broad principles of democratic education.

== Australia ==
New South Wales:

- Currambena School Lane Cove, Sydney NSW

Queensland:

- Brisbane Independent School Pullenvale, Brisbane QLD

Victoria:

- Alia College Hawthorn East, Melbourne VIC
- Preshil Kew, Melbourne VIC

== Canada ==
- ALPHA Alternative School (Toronto)
- Mont-Libre Agile Learning Centre (Montreal)
- Rochdale College (Toronto) (closed)
- SEED Alternative School (Toronto)

== Germany ==
- Neue Schule Hamburg
- Freie Schule Leipzig

== India ==
- Walden's Path (Hyderabad)

== Israel ==
- Democratic School of Hadera (Hadera)

== New Zealand ==
- Auckland Metropolitan College, Mount Eden, Auckland (closed December 2001)
- Ao Tawhiti Unlimited Discovery, Central Christchurch (It is not a democratic school but it is a special character school. Their educational principles are very democratic, but they still have grades, exams and a curriculum. The difference between a traditional and Ao Tawhiti school is that students at Ao Tawhiti school choose the classes they attend.)
- Tamariki School, Woolston, Christchurch

== Portugal ==
- Escola da Ponte (Vila Das AVES)

== United Kingdom ==
Currently open:

- Sands School (Ashburton, Devon)
- Summerhill School (Leiston, Suffolk)

Former democratic schools now closed:

- Dartington Hall School (Devon)
- The Family School (SW London)
- Kilquhanity School (Kirkcudbright)
- Kirkdale School (SE London)
- Malting House School (Cambridge)
- Rowen House School (Belper)
- Risinghill School (London)
- Scotland Road Free School (Liverpool)
- The Small School (Hartland, Devon)

== United States ==
California

- Deep Springs College (Deep Springs)

Illinois

- Shimer College (Chicago)

Indiana

- Harmony School (Indiana)

Maine

- Liberty School (Blue Hill, Maine)

Maryland

- Fairhaven School (Upper Marlboro)

Massachusetts

- The Group School, Cambridge, Massachusetts
- Mission Hill School (Closed)
- Sudbury Valley School (Framingham)
- Warehouse Cooperative School

New York

- Albany Free School (Albany)
- Brooklyn Free School, Brooklyn, f. 2004
- Lehman Alternative Community School (Ithaca)

North Carolina

- Arthur Morgan School (Burnsville)

Ohio

- Antioch College
- Antioch School

Oregon

- Adams High School (Portland) (closed)
- Metropolitan Learning Center (Portland) (formerly)
- Village Free School (Portland)

Pennsylvania

- The Circle School (Harrisburg)
- The Delta Program, a program within State College Area High School (State College)
- Philadelphia Free School
- Three Rivers Village School (Pittsburgh)
- Upattinas School and Resource Center (Glenmoore) (closed)

Vermont

- Goddard College (Plainfield)

Virginia

- The New School of Northern Virginia (Fairfax)

Washington

- The Clearwater School (Bothell)
- Goddard College (Port Washington and Seattle)

West Virginia

- The Highland School (Highland)

== See also ==
- Democratic education
- List of Sudbury schools
- Collaborative learning
- Constructionist learning
- Rouge Forum
- Lists of schools
- List of Montessori schools
