= Houston Sudbury School =

School in Houston, Texas, United States

Coordinates: 29.7621°N 95.6309°W

Houston Sudbury School (HSS) was a non-profit private Sudbury school in Spring Branch, Houston, Texas. The school served students of ages 6–18 and followed the Sudbury model of self-education.

The democracy was meted out in a weekly school meeting where staff and students discussed and voted on a variety of administrative aspects of the school, including rules. These rules were enforced through a peer justice system called the judicial committee.

== History ==
The school was founded in 2016 by Dominique Side and Cara DeBusk and opened in January of that year.

Its original campus was in Independence Heights. As of 2017 the school had 23 students; two of them identified as transgender, and the student body originated from various socioeconomic and racial groups. It was scheduled to move into another campus in May 2017, located in Acres Homes. The school shut down on December 16, 2022. It had six graduates.

== See also ==
- List of Sudbury schools
- Sudbury Valley School
- Brazos Valley Sudbury School - Formerly in operation in Waller County, near Houston
