= List of Sudbury schools =

Sudbury schools practice a form of schooling in which students individually decide what to do with their time, and learn as a by-product of ordinary experience rather than through classes or a standard curriculum. Students have complete responsibility for their own education and the school is run by a direct democracy in which students and staff have an equal vote.

The 'Sudbury' name refers to Sudbury Valley School, founded in 1968 in Framingham, Massachusetts, United States. The Sudbury Valley School has been the inspiration for numerous schools many of which refer to themselves as 'Sudbury schools.'

The Sudbury Valley School formally rejects the idea that there can be an official definition or official list of Sudbury schools and in 2016 ended its earlier practice of linking to other schools which claimed to operate in a manner similar to them. Daniel Greenberg, one of the founders of the Sudbury Valley School has written that there are two things that distinguish a Sudbury Model school: everyone is treated equally and there is no authority other than that granted by the consent of the school community.

== Current Sudbury schools ==
=== Germany ===
- Neue Schule Hamburg, Hamburg

=== United States ===
- The Circle School, Harrisburg, Pennsylvania
- The Clearwater School, Bothell, Washington
- Fairhaven School, Upper Marlboro, Maryland
- The Highland School, Ellenboro, West Virginia
- Philadelphia Free School, Philadelphia
- Sudbury Valley School, Framingham, Massachusetts
- Three Rivers Village School, Pittsburgh

== See also ==
- Sudbury Valley School
- Sudbury school
- List of democratic schools
- Lists of schools
