= Simon Greenberg =

Russian-born American rabbi and scholar (1901–1993)

- שמעון גרינברג
- Born: 1901; Horoshen, Russia
- Died: July 26, 1993 (aged 91–92); Jerusalem, Israel
- Occupations: Rabbi, Scholar
- Spouse: Betty Greenberg
- Children: Moshe Greenberg; Daniel Greenberg

Simon Greenberg (Hebrew: שמעון גרינברג; 1901 – July 26, 1993) was a Russian-born American Conservative rabbi and scholar. Greenberg was part of the senior management of many Jewish organizations in America. He helped to create several institutions, including the American Jewish University, of which he was the first President. He was vice chancellor emeritus of the Jewish Theological Seminary of America at his death. Greenberg has been called "one of the most important leaders of the Conservative movement".

== Life ==
Greenberg was born in Horoshen, Russia. At age 4, he moved to the United States with his family.

In 1922, Greenberg graduated from City College of New York, having previously attended the University of Minnesota. He then began studying at the Jewish Theological Seminary of America, where he was ordained a rabbi in 1925. Greenberg was committed to the academic and sacred spheres throughout his career, often undertaking overlapping tasks. Thus, 1925 marked Greenberg's ordination, his enrollment at the Hebrew University of Jerusalem as part of its first class of students, and his appointment as rabbi of the Har Zion Temple in Philadelphia, a position he would hold until 1946. His responsibilities in Philadelphia included advising Jewish students at the nearby University of Pennsylvania and Temple University. In his final year in Philadelphia, he helped to co-found the Akiba Hebrew Academy.

In 1932, Greenberg was awarded his PhD from Dropsie College. He went on to join the faculty of the Jewish Theological Seminary the same year. In 1950, he became executive director of the United Synagogue of America. The same year, at the organization's biennial conference, he was instrumental in persuading fellow attendees to call for the repeal of the McCarran Internal Security Act. Greenberg spoke against the Act, calling it a threat to civil liberties. Greenberg stepped down from his role as executive director in 1953.

In 1948, Greenberg was named acting president of the Jewish Theological Seminary. In 1957, Greenberg became vice chancellor of the Jewish Theological Seminary, a post he held until 1986. Thereafter, he was vice chancellor emeritus. In 1958, shortly after becoming vice chancellor, Greenberg co-founded the University of Judaism (now the American Jewish University) in Los Angeles. He was the institute's first president and stepped down from the role in 1963 to become chairman of the executive committee of the Jewish Agency and the World Zionist Organization of America. He stepped down from that role in 1968.

== Personal life ==
Greenberg and his wife, Betty, were married for 67 years. They had two sons, Moshe Greenberg, a biblical scholar, and Daniel Greenberg. The couple had moved to Jerusalem from Manhattan approximately a year before Simon's death. His wife predeceased him by 4 months.

== Legacy ==
Greenberg has been called "one of the most important leaders of the Conservative movement". Every year, the Jewish Theological Seminary presents the Rabbi Simon Greenberg Award "for outstanding devotion to klal Yisrael (the entire Jewish community) and to all humanity and for unswerving loyalty to JTS."

== Selected publications ==
- "Living as a Jew Today" (Behrman, 1940),
- "Foundations of a Faith" (Burning Bush Press, 1967),
- "The Ethical in the Jewish and American Heritage" (Jewish Theological Seminary, 1977)
- "A Jewish Philosophy and Pattern of Life" (Jewish Theological Seminary, 1981).

He edited "The Ordination of Women as Rabbis," a collection of articles, in 1988.
