= Brisbane Independent School =

Coordinates: 27.5237°S 152.9191°E

- Brisbane, Queensland; Australia

Information
- Type: Independent school
- Motto: Teaching Young Minds Since 1968
- Established: 1968
- Principal: Lachlyn Bowie
- Enrolment: 51 (2025)
- Campus: Pullenvale
- Website: http://www.bis.qld.edu.au/

Brisbane Independent School is an independent, co-educational, primary school, located in the Brisbane suburb of Pullenvale, in Queensland, Australia. It is administered by Independent Schools Queensland, with an enrolment of 63 students and a teaching staff of 7, as of 2023. The school serves students from Prep to Year 6, in five classrooms.

== History ==
The school opened on 19 August 1968, by October the very same year, the school had an enrolment of 23 students. The school had a singular rule in 1968, "Be Kind," where discipline in the school was minimal, to instill self-discipline within the students, which has been stated to be "ahead of their time." In 1972, the school moved from Moggill Road, Kenmore, to its present location in Pullenvale.

In 1978, Lady Anna Cowen, wife of Zelman Cowen, opened the schools fete.

During the Omicron wave of COVID-19 in 2022, the school managed to remain outbreak free, due to the research conducted by a group of individuals within the school community, and subsequently the implementation of air purifiers in the school's classrooms.

== See also ==
- Democratic school
- Alternative education
- List of schools in Queensland
- Summerhill School
- Sudbury model school
- List of Sudbury schools
- Non-profit organization
- Community organisation
