= The Highland School =

Location
- 98 Sycamore Springs Lane; Ellenboro, West Virginia 26346; United States; 39°18′18.7″N 81°3′9.3″W

Information
- Type: Private
- Established: 1981; 45 years ago
- Founders: Charlotte and Steve Landvoigt
- CEEB code: 490557
- NCES School ID: A0702439
- Faculty: 4
- Gender: Co-educational
- Enrollment: 11 (2015)
- Campus type: Rural
- Annual tuition: $2,475/day student
- Website: www.thehighlandschool.org

The Highland School is a democratic school for students in Ellenboro, West Virginia, United States. It was founded in 1981 by Charlotte and Steve Landvoigt. The school was inspired by the Summerhill School in Suffolk, England and is similar to the Sudbury model of democratic schooling. Its boarding program was a unique feature in the United States.

The Highland School historically hosted students from all over the world including Japan, France, Germany, Switzerland and the Philippines. International students interacted with day students from central West Virginia and boarding students from other regions of the United States. In the Spring of 2020 the school eliminated its boarding program due to the COVID-19 pandemic. The school continues to operate its day program.

== See also ==
- List of democratic schools
- List of Sudbury schools
