= Fairhaven School =

Fairhaven School may refer to:

- Fairhaven School (Upper Marlboro, Maryland)
- Fairhaven School Public Elementary School in Fairhaven, Saskatoon, Canada
- Fairhaven High School
- Fairhaven School, in Diamond Lake School District 76, Mundelein, Illinois
- Rumson-Fair Haven Regional High School
- Fairhaven School in the western Bay of Plenty Region, New Zealand
