= BVSS =

BVSS may refer to:

- Bedok View Secondary School, a secondary school in Bedok, Singapore
- Brazos Valley Sudbury School, a defunct Sudbury school in Waller County, Texas
