= Brazos Valley Sudbury School =

Coordinates: 29.767822°N 96.007532°W

Brazos Valley Sudbury School (BVSS) was a Sudbury school in unincorporated Waller County, Texas, near Brookshire. It was in proximity to Katy.

The school, located in the Brazos Valley region, served ages 4 through 19. Its campus had 4,000 square feet (370 m^{2}) of space.

== History ==
It was founded by Tomball resident Laura Gabelsberg, who previously taught at public schools in the Dallas-Fort Worth metroplex. In April 2001, Gabelsberg held a public meeting with 25 others, discussing different educational philosophies for a proposed school, and after the meeting, the group selected the Sudbury system. By September 2001, the group was holding meetings about the establishment of the school.

A woman named Chicha Glass, along with her husband, lent her house, which became a 4,000-square-foot (370 m^{2}) classroom building, for the school's operations and gave $25,000 in startup funds. Her husband and she moved into a garage apartment on the same property. In February 2002, the school began operations, and was scheduled to open in fall 2002.

From Brookshire, the Houston Subdbury Group, which operated the school, moved to the Houston Heights in Houston for the 2005–2006 school year; it aimed to move BVSS to Houston. The school assembly passed a motion to not reopen for the upcoming school year in spring 2006. A spring 2007 meeting was held in which the possibility of continuing operation of a Sudbury school was discussed.

== Curriculum ==
The school allowed students, who were required to attend five hours per day but did not have to conform to a timetable, to choose the direction of their learning in accordance with the Sudbury system. The school did not issue grades nor administer tests. Parents were not involved in the day-to-day administration and the faculty acted as guides instead of using direct control in the classroom.

== See also ==
- Houston Sudbury School - a Sudbury school in Houston
- List of Sudbury schools
