= Fairhaven School (Prince George's County, Maryland) =

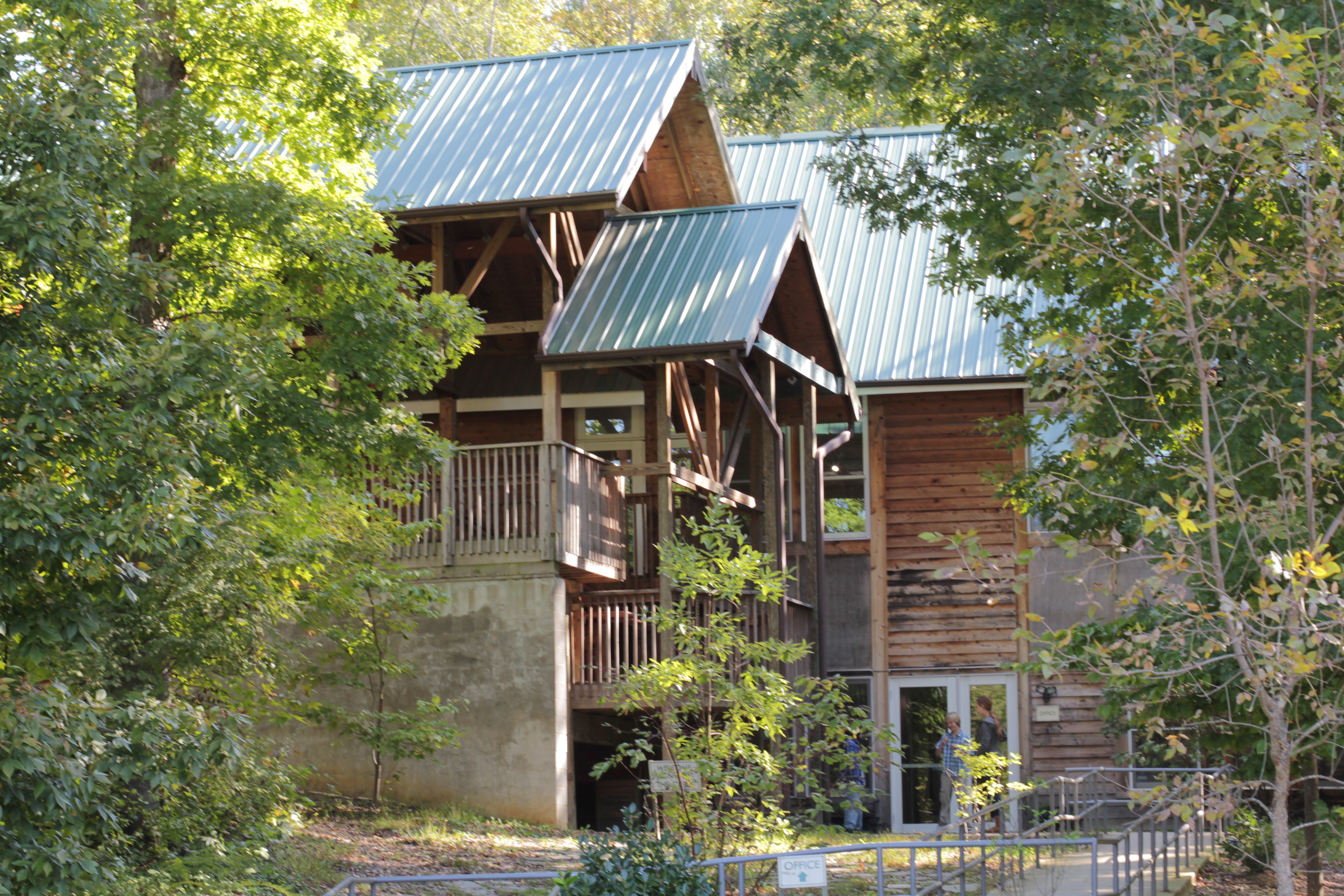
- Fairhaven in October 2011

Location
- 17900 Queen Anne Road; Upper Marlboro, Maryland; Prince George's, 20774; USA
- 38.8919°N 76.6930°W

Information
- Type: Democratic School (Sudbury Model)
- Motto: "Free minds in action"
- Established: 1998
- Staff: 5 full time teaching
- Gender: Coeducational
- Age: 5 to 19
- Philosophy: Sudbury
- Governance: School Meeting (democratic, vote by students and staff)
- Website: www.fairhavenschool.com

Fairhaven School is a private school in unincorporated Prince George's County, Maryland, with an Upper Marlboro post office address.

It was founded in 1998. It is one of over 30 schools based on the Sudbury Model. The model has two basic tenets: educational freedom and democratic governance. It is a private school, attended by children from the ages of 5 to 19. The school was founded by Mark and Kim McCaig after learning about Sudbury Valley School in Framingham, Massachusetts.

== Philosophy ==
As a practitioner of the Sudbury Model, the Fairhaven School uses a form of democratic education in which students individually decide what to do with their time and learn as a by-product of ordinary experience rather than through classes or a standard curriculum. Students are given complete responsibility for their own education, and the school is run in a direct democracy in which students and staff are equals.

Fairhaven School enforces a flexible attendance policy, in which students must attend for 5 hours per day but can intersperse the premises as long as they meet that minimum time requirement.

Because Fairhaven has no set curriculum or classes, students are allowed to request what classes they want to attend.

== School Meeting ==
Every Wednesday, the school holds a meeting in which major decisions, such as electing staff and approving the budget, are voted on. The School Meeting is run by a Chair and Secretary. This meeting serves as a place for students or staff to make announcements and approve motions. All students and staff have the right to vote during these meetings. The School Meeting also acts as a court for Referrals and Not Guilty Trials.

== Judicial Committee ==
There is a Daily Judicial Committee that meets to address grievances and give consequences to students who break rules. Two clerks are elected every six weeks, along with the two alternate clerks. One staff member sits in on the Judicial Committee. Every student in the school takes their turn on the Judicial Committee, and serves a two-week term. There is a yearly election for law clerks who act as overseers for the smooth functioning of the Judicial Committee and Not Guilty trials in School Meetings.

Students may write up fellow students or staff members for breaking the rules in the Law Book. A Judicial Committee meeting unfolds as the follows: First all available information about the case is gathered, and both the Defendant, and Plaintiff are given a chance to state their case. After a report has been approved, the Judicial Committee decides whether to charge any individuals with breaking school rules stated in the Law Book. If an individual is charged, they have the right to plead either Guilty or Not Guilty. If the individual is found Guilty they are given a punishment; if they plead Not Guilty their case is sent to School Meeting for a final verdict. If a crime is considered too extreme to be handled by Judicial Committee, it is referred to School Meeting for further sentencing.

== Committees and Corporations ==
Many aspects of the school are determined by groups of students who form various Committees and Corporations. Corporations such as Kitchen Corp., Computer Corp., and even Board Game Corp., meet regularly to decide how best to allocate their funds. Whereas Committees such as Judicial Committee, Aesthetics Committee, Public Relations Committee, work on governing different areas of the school and even maintaining it. A new corporation or committee may be chartered at any time, given enough student support and a favorable School Meeting vote.

== Graduation process ==
In order for a student to graduate from Fairhaven School, they must write a thesis on how they have used the school's philosophy to become effective adults. This thesis is presented to a tribunal of peers from other Sudbury schools and thoroughly evaluated. During the process known as "Thesis Defense", the student is interviewed by the tribunal to ensure he or she is ready to graduate. If the student passes both the "Thesis Defense" and the thesis review, they are allowed to graduate and provided with a high school diploma.

== See also ==
- List of Sudbury schools
- Education Otherwise British home schooling charity
- Dartington School British residential educational trust
- Summerhill School
- Democratic education
- List of democratic schools
- Unschooling

== Gallery ==
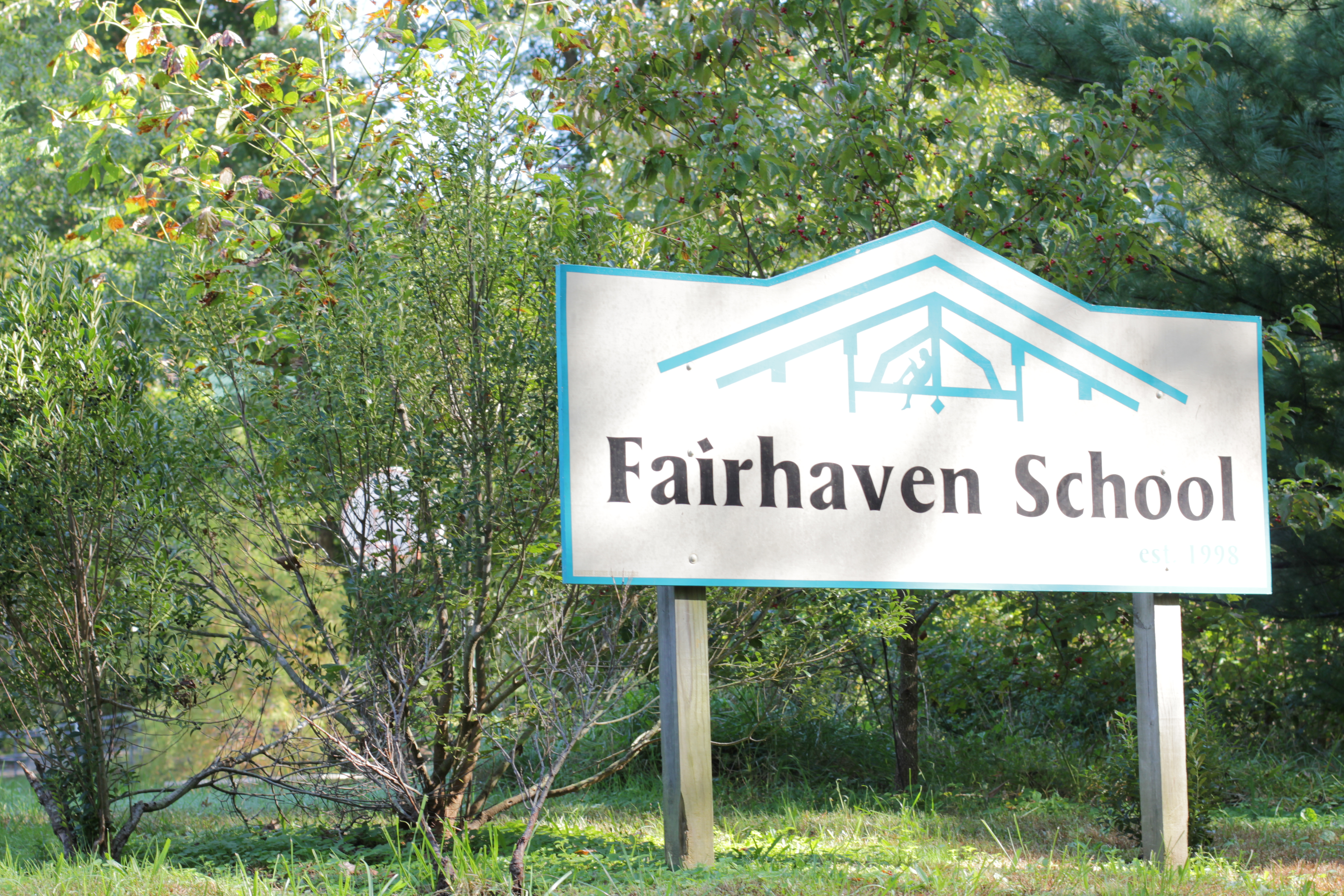
A picture of the Fairhaven Sign.

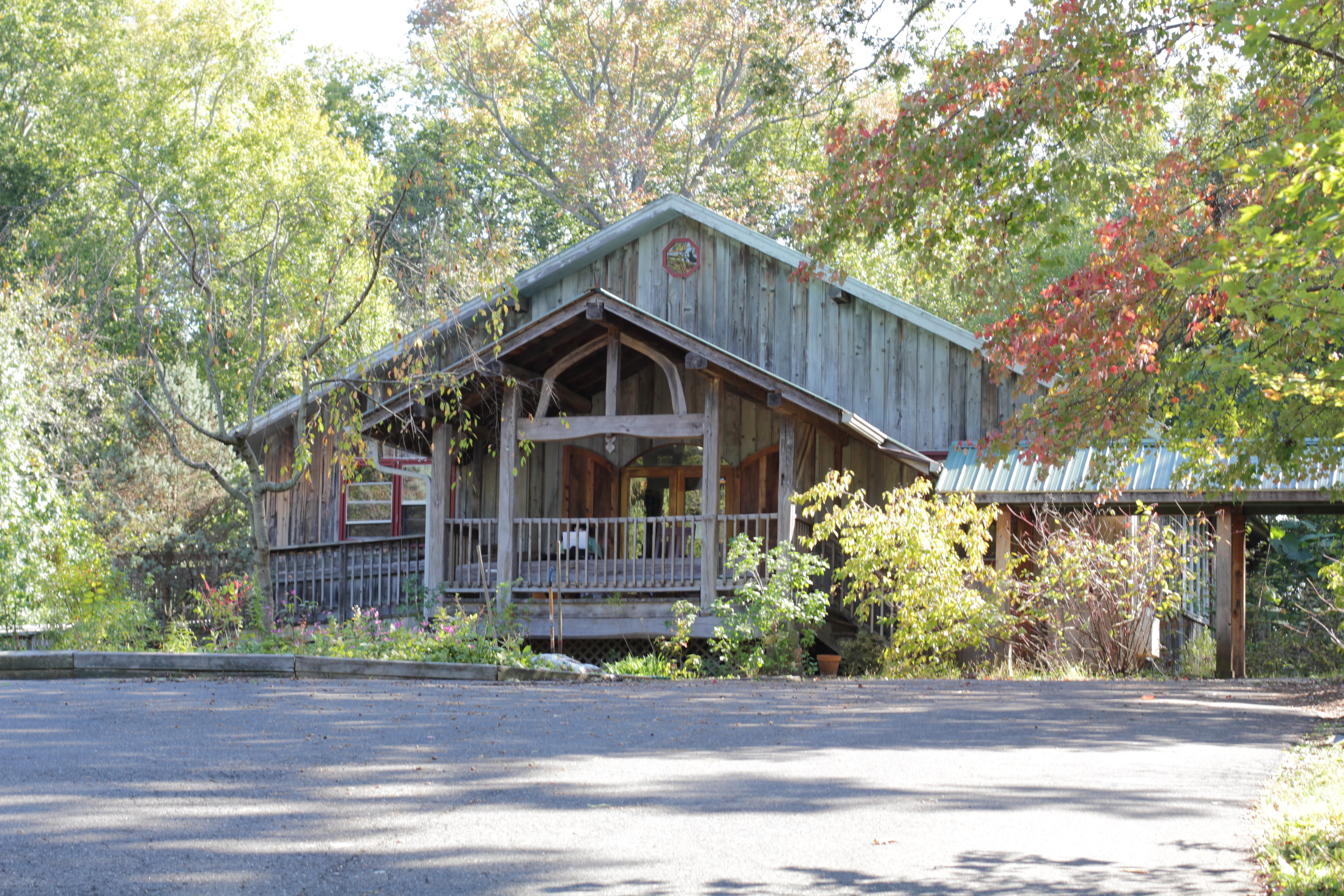
A picture of the Old Building in the Spring.

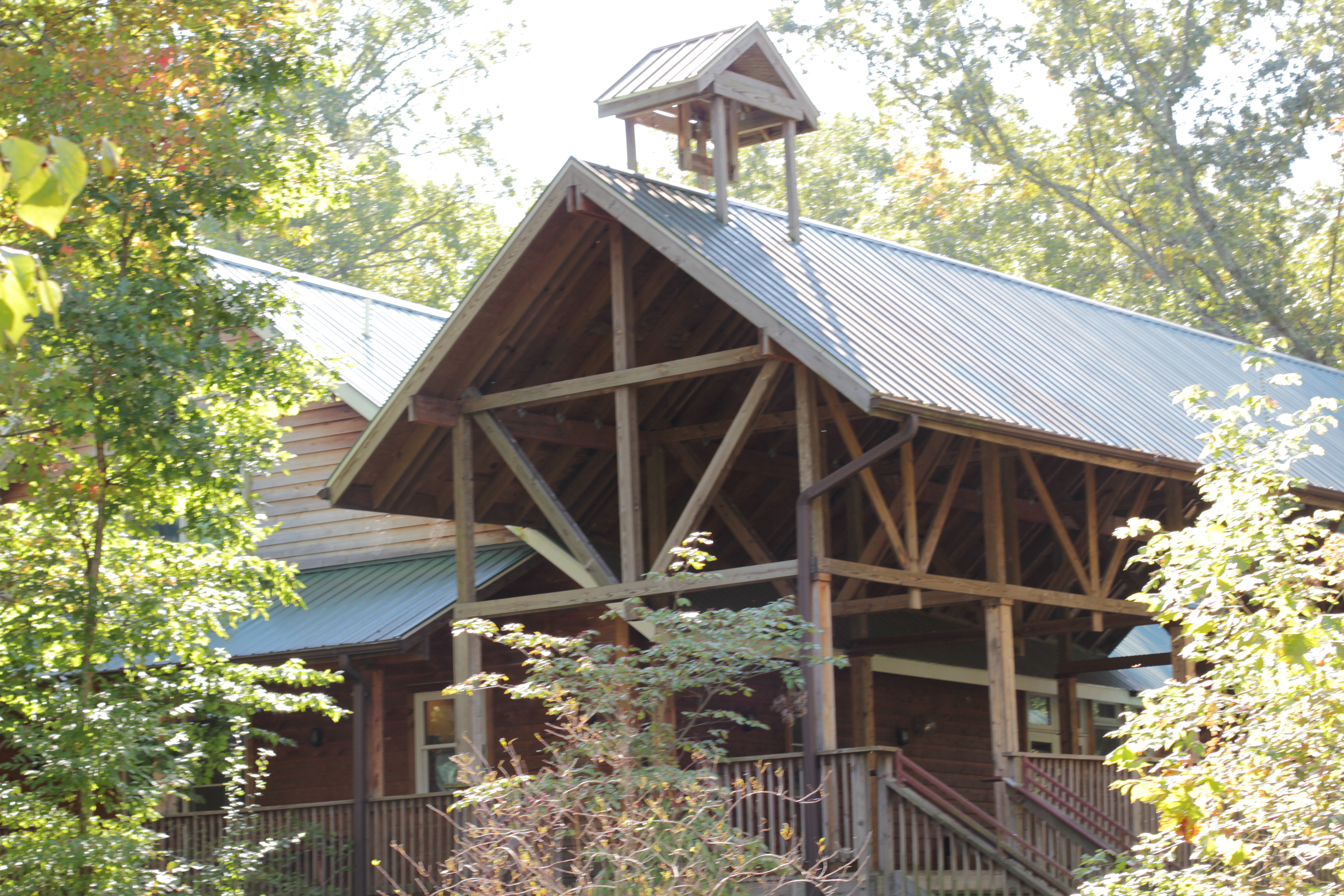
A picture of the side of the New Building.
