= Philadelphia Free School =

Coordinates: 39.941330°N 75.175924°W

The Philadelphia Free School

Location
- 4950 Springfield Ave, Philadelphia, PA 19143; Philadelphia, Pennsylvania; United States

Information
- Established: 2011
- Grades: Kindergarten through twelfth grade
- Campus type: Urban
- Tuition: Sliding scale
- Philosophy: Democratic education
- Website: http://www.phillyfreeschool.org

The Philadelphia Free School also known as Philly Free School or PFS, is a Democratic Free School in Philadelphia, Pennsylvania. Philly Free School operates on the democratic education or Sudbury school model. The school opened in the fall of 2011 and offers a sliding scale tuition to students ages 4 to 19.

Philadelphia Free School emphasizes critical thinking, personal responsibility, and democratic governance, rather than standardization and hierarchy.

== Structure ==
Unlike conventional schools, the Philadelphia Free School has no principal or hierarchy among its employees. Every member of the school, student and staff alike, possesses an equal vote on all matters of substance. The school is governed through the School Meeting, and all students and staff participate in the school's Judicial Committee. Students direct their own learning. There is no prescribed curriculum. Students learn from each other, the staff and from the learning materials available to them in the school, in the city, and beyond.

== History ==
Co-founders of the school include: Robert and Michelle Loucas, Mark Filippone, Eric Marr, Suzy Eachus, Nancy Golumbia, Karen Wolfe, Joel Price, Amanda Lanham, Smith Jean, Lani Bevacqua and Darian Shiranui, who had a goal of bringing to Philadelphia a school similar to The Circle School in Harrisburg, Pennsylvania. In July 2010, the Philadelphia Free School incorporated as a 501(c)(3) non-profit organization. In September 2020, the school moved location to 4950 Avenue, from 2001 Christian St.

== See also ==
- List of democratic schools
- Democratic education
- Education reform
