= Giulia della Rena =

Blessed Giulia della Rena
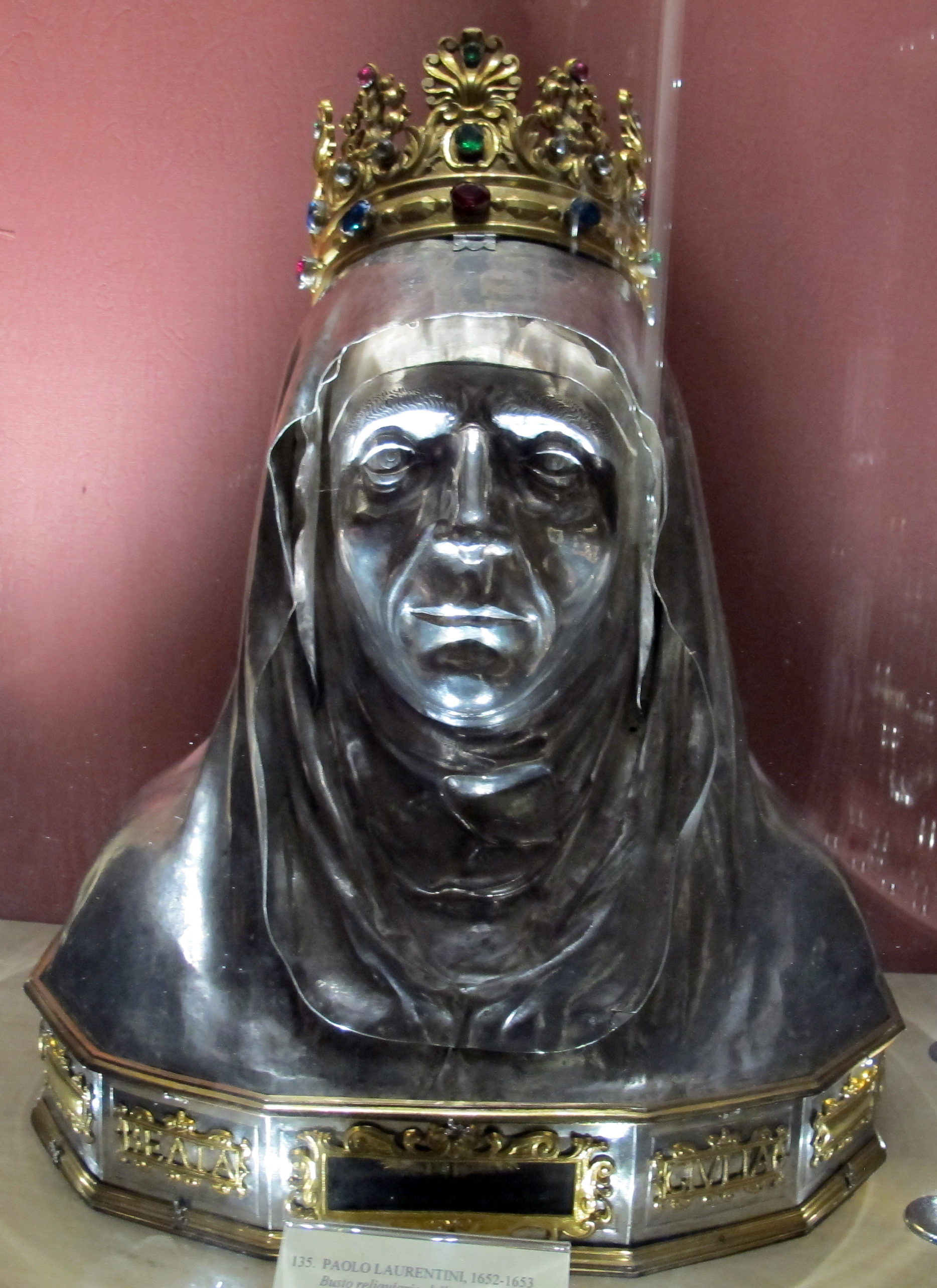
- Born: 1319; Certaldo, Republic of Florence
- Died: 9 January 1367; Certaldo, Republic of Florence
- Resting place: Santi Jacopo e Filippo, Certaldo
- Venerated in: Roman Catholic Church
- Beatified: 18 May 1819, Saint Peter's Basilica by Pope Pius VII
- Major shrine: Santi Jacopo e Filippo, Certaldo
- Feast: 9 January, 15 February (Augustinians)

Giulia della Rena (1319 – 9 January 1367) was an Italian Roman Catholic professed member of the Order of Saint Augustine in its third order branch. Della Rena was orphaned sometime in her late childhood and sought work as a maid in Florence where she soon became a member of the Augustinian tertiaries. The religious then returned to Certaldo due to the negative Florentine economic and political climate where she became best known for rescuing a child from a burning building.

== Life ==
Giulia della Rena was born to impoverished nobles (whose status began to wane) in Certaldo sometime in 1319. She was orphaned of both her parents sometime in her childhood.

Della Rena sought work outside of her hometown and became a maid to the Timolfi household in Florence. In 1337 at the Augustinian church of the Holy Spirit, she became an Augustinian Secular. But the tumult in Florence caused her to return home to Certaldo where she rescued a child from a burning building in a move that brought her unwanted fame and attention. She then retired to live the remainder of her life as an anchoress in a small cell that was built to the church of Santi Jacopo e Filippo. She had little in her small cell save for a little window and a Crucifix.

Della Rena died at the beginning of 1367. Her remains were interred in the church of Santi Jacopo e Filippo and were moved to its altar in 1372.

== Beatification ==
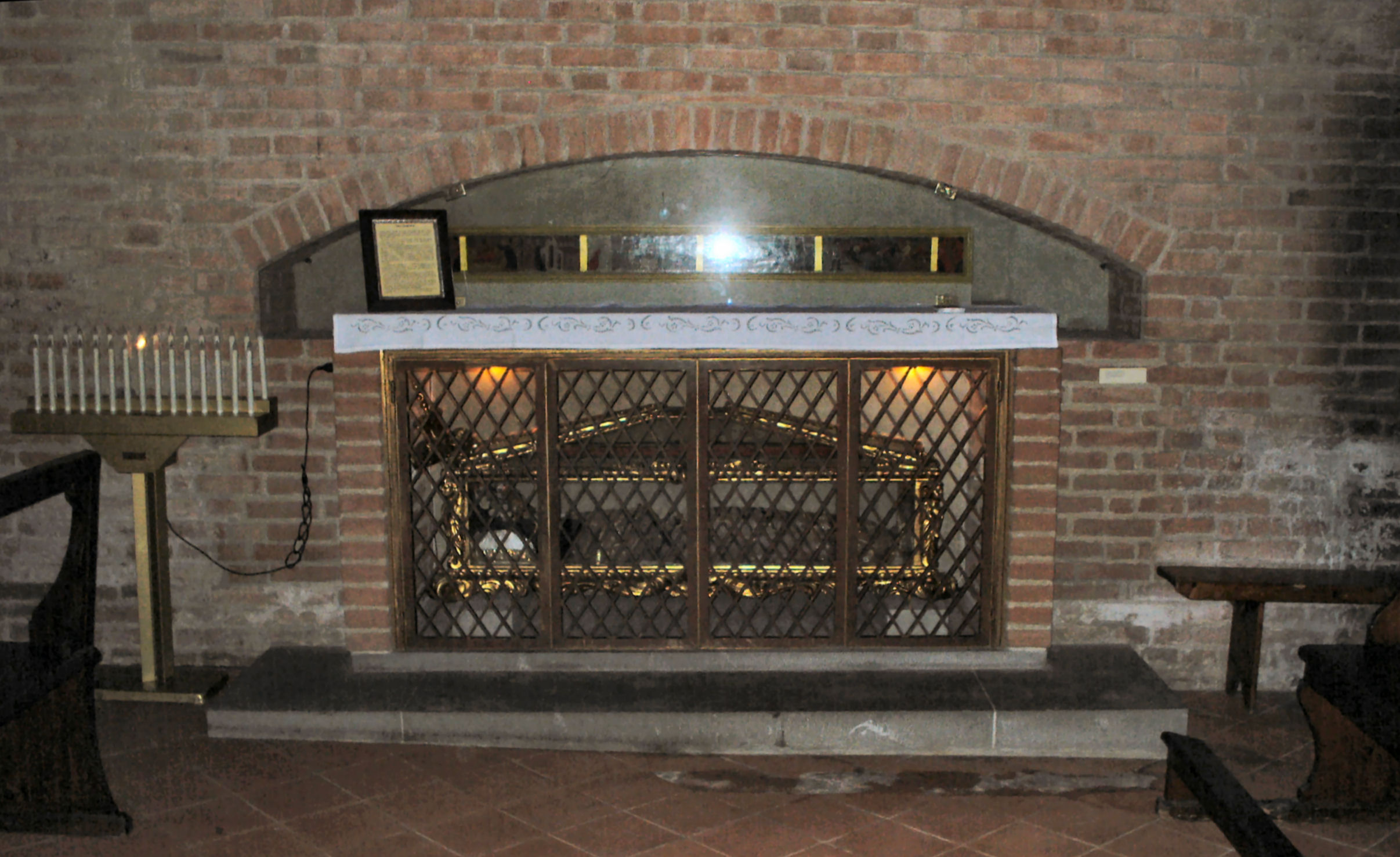
Tomb in Ss. Jacopo e Filippo in Certaldo.

In 1819 Pope Pius VII confirmed her blessed ab immemorabili.
