= Susan Butcher =

American dog musher (1954–2006)

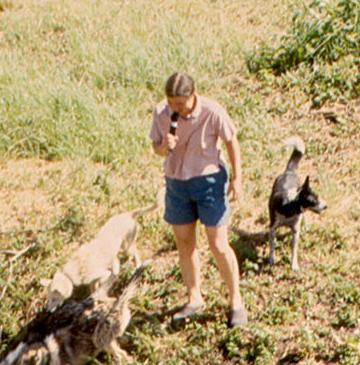
- Susan Butcher and dogs in 1997, speaking to tourists aboard a Riverboat Discovery cruise from her kennels near Fairbanks International Airport
- Born: December 26, 1954; Cambridge, Massachusetts, U.S.
- Died: August 5, 2006 (aged 51); Seattle, Washington, U.S.
- Education: Colorado State University
- Years active: 1978-1994
- Known for: Sled dog racing
- Spouse: David Monson
- Awards: Golden Plate Award; Female Athlete of the Year

Susan Howlet Butcher (December 26, 1954 – August 5, 2006) was an American dog musher, noteworthy as the second woman to win the Iditarod Trail Sled Dog Race in 1986, the second four-time winner in 1990, and the first to win four out of five sequential years. She is commemorated in Alaska by the Susan Butcher Day.

== Life and career ==
Iditarod Finishes
Year	Position	Time
1978	19th	16d 15h 40m 30s
1979	9th	16d 11h 15m 32s
1980	5th	15d 10h 17m 6s
1981	5th	12d 12h 45m 24s
1982	2nd	16d 4h 43m 53s
1983	9th	13d 10h 25m 32s
1984	2nd	12d 16h 41m 42s
1985	Scratched
1986	1st	11d 15h 6m 0s
1987	1st	11d 2h 5m 13s
1988	1st	11d 11h 41m 40s
1989	2nd	11d 6h 28m 50s
1990	1st	11d 1h 53m 23s
1991	3rd	12d 21h 59m 3s
1992	2nd	11d 5h 36m 3s
1993	4th	10d 22h 2m 40s
1994	10th	11d 6h 7m 20s

Susan Butcher was born in Cambridge, Massachusetts, a lover of dogs and the outdoors. She completed secondary school at the Warehouse Cooperative School, then studied at Colorado State University, and ultimately became a veterinary technician.

To pursue her love of dogsled racing and breeding huskies, she moved to the Wrangell Mountains area of Alaska. There Butcher began training to compete in the Iditarod Trail Sled Dog Race, a grueling 1,112 to 1,131-mile race through arctic blizzard conditions across the Alaska wilderness, which tests the endurance of both mushers and dogs over the course of one to two weeks. She spent two years working for Iditarod founder Joe Redington in exchange for dogs to build up her team. In 1979, she and Redington, along with Ray Genet and two others, made the first dog-sled ascent of Denali.

After placing in several Iditarods, Butcher was forced to withdraw early in the 1985 when two of her dogs were killed by a crazed moose, despite Butcher's attempts to ward the animal off, and thirteen others were injured. Libby Riddles, a relative newcomer, braved a blizzard and became the first woman to win the Iditarod that year.

The more experienced Butcher won the next race in 1986, and then proceeded to win again in 1987, 1988, and 1990. She joins fellow four-time winners Martin Buser, Jeff King, Lance Mackey, Doug Swingley, and Rick Swenson who won five, and Dallas Seavey who won six.

Butcher married fellow dog racer David Monson on September 2, 1985. They had two daughters, Tekla and Chisana.

She held the Iditarod speed record from 1986 until 1992, breaking her own records in 1987 and 1990. Her other speed records included the Norton Sound 250, Kobuk 220, Kuskokwim 300, and the John Beargrease Sled Dog Marathon. She retired from competition in 1995.

Her accomplishments gained her substantial media attention in the late 1980s and earned her many awards, including the National Women's Sports Foundation Amateur Athlete of The Year Award and the Tanqueray Athlete of the Year. She also won the U.S. Victor Award for Female Athlete of the Year two years in a row. In 1988, she received the Golden Plate Award of the American Academy of Achievement presented by Awards Council member Philip Anschutz. In 2007, Butcher was inducted into the Alaska Sports Hall of Fame as one of the five charter members in the inaugural class.

In episode 1 of season 28 of Antiques Roadshow, the 1990 trophy that Butcher won for her record breaking 4th Iditarod was valued at $50,000-100,000 dollars

== Illness and legacy ==
On December 2, 2005, Butcher was diagnosed with acute myelogenous leukemia, which had manifested as a blood disorder three years earlier. She underwent chemotherapy at the University of Washington and the Fred Hutchinson Cancer Research Center in Seattle, and received a bone marrow transplant on May 17, 2006, after the cancer went into remission. According to her husband David Monson, "someone said this might be a tough disease, but this leukemia hasn't met Susan Butcher yet."

Butcher died on August 5, 2006, after fighting graft-versus-host disease and learning that the cancer had returned.

On March 1, 2008, Susan Butcher was honored by the State of Alaska when, just prior to the start of the 2008 Iditarod, Gov. Sarah Palin signed a bill establishing the first Saturday of every March as Susan Butcher Day. The day coincides with the traditional start of the Iditarod each year. Observing the special day, the bill noted, provides opportunity for people to "remember the life of Susan Butcher, an inspiration to Alaskans and to millions around the world."

== See also ==
- List of female adventurers
