= Daniel Greenberg (educator) =

Co-founder of Sudbury Valley School (1934–2021)

Daniel Asher Greenberg (28 September 1934 – 2 December 2021), was one of the founders of the Sudbury Valley School, has published several books on the Sudbury model of school organization, and was described by Sudbury Valley School trustee Peter Gray as the "principal philosopher" among its founders. He was a physics professor at Columbia University, and was described by Lois Holzman as the school's "chief 'philosophical writer'".

== Publications ==
Books

- 1964, Anaxagoras and the Birth of Physics with Daniel E. Gershenson, OCLC 899834
- 1973, Announcing a New School: A Personal Account of the Beginnings of the Sudbury Valley School, ISBN 1-888947-11-X
- 1974, Outline of a New Philosophy, ISBN 1-888947-17-9
- 1985, The Sudbury Valley School Experience with Hanna Greenberg, Michael Greenberg, Laura Ransom, Mimsy Sadofsky and Alan White, ISBN 1-888947-01-2
- 1987, Child Rearing, ISBN 1-888947-06-3
- 1988, Early lessons : some recollections of my youth and what it taught me, ISBN 1-888947-09-8
- 1991, Free at Last: The Sudbury Valley School, ISBN 1-888947-00-4
- 1992, Legacy of Trust, Life After the Sudbury Valley School Experience with Mimsy Sadofsky, ISBN 1-888947-04-7
- 1992, A New Look at Schools, ISBN 1-888947-03-9
- 1992, Education in America: A View from Sudbury Valley, ISBN 1-888947-07-1
- 1994, Worlds in Creation, ISBN 1-888947-10-1
- 1994, Kingdom of Childhood: Growing Up At Sudbury Valley School with Mimsy Sadofsky and Hanna Greenberg, ISBN 1-888-94702-0
- 1998, Starting a Sudbury School: A Summary of the Experiences of Fifteen Start-Up Groups with Mimsy Sadofsky, ISBN 1-888947-19-5
- 1999, Reflections on the Sudbury School Concept with Mimsy Sadofsky, ISBN 1-888947-20-9
- 2000, A Clearer View: New Insights into the Sudbury School Model, ISBN 1-888947-22-5
- 2005, The Pursuit of Happiness: The Lives of Sudbury Valley Alumni with Mimsy Sadofsky and Jason Lempka, ISBN 1-888947-25-X
- 2008, Turning Learning Right Side Up: Putting Education Back on Track with Russell L. Ackoff, ISBN 0-13-234649-4
- 2016, A Place to Grow: The Culture of Sudbury Valley School, ISBN 1-888947-26-8
- 2018, America at Risk: How Schools Undermine Our Country's Core Values, ISBN 1-888947-32-2
- 2018, Constructing Reality: The Most Creative of All the Arts, ISBN 1-888947-28-4
- 2018, The Meaning of Education, ISBN 1-888947-29-2

Chapters

- 1994, "Democratic to the Core: Life in Sudbury Valley School", in The Handbook of Alternative Education.

Papers

- 1960, Theory of Allowed and Forbidden Transitions in Muon Capture Reactions. II, with Masato Morita, in Physical Review, 119, pp. 435–437.
- 1960, Theory of the Hyperfine Anomalies of Deuterium, Tritium, and Helium-3^{+}, with Henry M. Foley, in Physical Review, 120, pp. 1684–1697.
- 1987, Idea Notebook: Teaching Justice through Experience, in Journal of Experiential Education, 10(1), pp. 46–47.

Articles

- 1991, Learning without coercion: Sudbury Valley School in Mothering, 58, pp. 102–105.
- 1985–1992, regular column in the Middlesex News on education in America.
