= Moshe Greenberg =

American rabbi (1928–2010)

- משה גרינברג
- Born: 10 July 1928; Philadelphia, Pennsylvania, United States
- Died: 15 May 2010 (aged 81); Jerusalem, Israel
- Education: University of Pennsylvania
- Occupations: Rabbi, Bible scholar
- Spouse: Evelyn Gelber
- Children: 3 sons
- Awards: Guggenheim Fellowship (1961); Harrison Prize for Distinguished Teaching and Research; Israel Prize in Bible (1994)

Moshe Greenberg (Hebrew: משה גרינברג; July 10, 1928 – May 15, 2010) was an American rabbi, Bible scholar, and professor emeritus of the Hebrew University of Jerusalem.

== Biography ==
Moshe Greenberg was born in Philadelphia in 1928. Raised in a Hebrew-speaking Zionist home, he studied Bible and Hebrew literature from his youth. His father, Rabbi Simon Greenberg, was the rabbi of Har Zion Temple and one of the most important leaders of the Conservative movement. Moshe Greenberg received his doctorate from the University of Pennsylvania in 1954, studying Bible and Assyriology under E. A. Speiser; simultaneously, he studied post-Biblical Judaica at the Jewish Theological Seminary of America (JTSA), where he was ordained as a rabbi. Greenberg was married to Evelyn Gelber and had three sons. He died in Jerusalem after a long illness.

== Academic and literary career ==
Greenberg taught Bible and Judaica at the University of Pennsylvania from 1964-1970. He held a chair in Jewish studies at the Hebrew University of Jerusalem, an institution at which he had taught since 1970. He also taught at Swarthmore College, the JTSA, the University of California, Berkeley and the Schechter Institute of Jewish Studies. Greenberg was editor-in-chief of the Ketuvim section of the Jewish Publication Society of America's new English translation of the Bible. He was the author of ten books and numerous articles. From 1994-1995 he held a fellowship at the Katz Center for Advanced Judaic Studies, doing research in Historiography.

== Scholarship ==
Greenberg was the first Jewish Bible scholar appointed to a position in a secular university after World War II and had an important influence on the development of Biblical scholarship. He focused on the phenomenology of biblical religion and law, the theory and practice of interpreting biblical texts, and the role of the Bible in Jewish thought. In the area of prayer, Greenberg studied the development of biblical petition and praise, which he portrayed as "a vehicle of humility, an expression of un-selfsufficiency, which in biblical thought, is the proper stance of humans before God" (Studies, 75-108). He showed that the prose prayers embedded in biblical narratives reflect the piety of commoners, and reasoned that the frequency of spontaneous prayer strengthened the egalitarian tendency of Israelite religion which led to the establishment of the synagogue. In the area of biblical law, Greenberg argued that "the law [is] the expression of underlying postulates or values of culture" and that differences between biblical and ancient Near Eastern laws were not reflections of different stages of social development but of different underlying legal and religious principles (Studies, 25-41). Analyzing economic, social, political, and religious laws in the Torah, he showed that they dispersed authority throughout society and prevented the monopolization of prestige and power by narrow elite groups (Studies, 51-61). In his commentaries on Exodus (1969) and Ezekiel (1983, 1997), Greenberg developed a "holistic" method of exegesis, redirecting attention from the text's "hypothetically reconstructed elements" to the biblical books as integral wholes and products of thoughtful and artistic design. Greenberg's studies of Jewish thought include studies of the intellectual achievements of medieval Jewish exegesis, investigations of rabbinic reflections on defying illegal orders (Studies, 395-403), and attitudes toward members of other religions (Studies, 369-393; "A Problematic Heritage"). He argued that a Scripture-based religion must avoid fundamentalism through selectivity and re-prioritizing values.

== Awards ==
- In 1961, Greenberg was awarded a Guggenheim Fellowship.
- He was also awarded the Harrison Prize for Distinguished Teaching and Research.
- In 1994, he was awarded the Israel Prize in Bible. Greenberg also taught at Beyt Midrash leShalom, the Peace Study Center sponsored jointly by the Israeli Religious Peace Movement Netivot Shalom and by Tikkun Magazine.

== Published works ==
- Hab Piru, 1955
- Introduction to Hebrew, 1965
- Understanding Exodus, 1967
- Biblical Prose Prayer as a Window to the Popular Religion of Ancient Israel, 1983
- Ezekiel in the Anchor Bible Series 3 volumes, 1983, 1997 (third volume was to be completed by Jacob Milgrom, who died June 5, 2010)
- Torah: Five Books of Moses, 2000

== See also ==
- List of Israel Prize recipients

== Bibliography ==
- Moshe Greenberg: An Appreciation," and "Bibliography of the Writings of Moshe Greenberg," pp. ix-xxxviii in M. Cogan, B.L. Eichler, and J.H. Tigay, eds., Tehilla le-Moshe. Biblical and Judaic
- Studies in Honor of Moshe Greenberg. Winona Lake, Indiana: Eisenbrauns, 1997
- S.D. Sperling, ed., Students of the Covenant: A History of Jewish Biblical Scholarship in North America (Atlanta: Scholars Press, 1992), index s.v. "Greenberg, Moshe."
- Pras Yisra'el 5754 (Israel Prizes, 1994). Israel: Ministry of Science and Arts; Ministry of Education, Culture, and Sports, 1994), pp. 5–7 (in Hebrew)
