= Three Rivers Village School =

Location
- Pittsburgh, Pennsylvania; United States
- 40°24′26″N 79°56′31″W

Information
- Established: 2013
- Grades: K-12
- Enrollment: 35
- Campus type: Urban
- Tuition: $14,000 per year
- Philosophy: Democratic education
- Website: threeriversvillageschool.org

Three Rivers Village School is the first democratic school in Pittsburgh. It operates on the Sudbury school model of democratic education. Three Rivers Village School opened in the Fall of 2013 and accepts students from kindergarten through twelfth grade. It is a tuition-based private school that offers a sliding scale tuition rate. As of 2025, it has around 35 students.

Three Rivers Village School emphasizes personal responsibility, innate thoughtfulness, and trust in the judgment of its students and strives to foster a community of equals governed by democratic values, instead of the hierarchy, standardized testing, and rule-following enforced in the traditional schooling model.

== Curriculum ==
The students at Three Rivers Village School are free to use their time during each school day however they wish, as long as they adhere to the rules defined by the School Meeting. Resources available to the students include books, computers, musical instruments, a kitchen, art supplies, toys, outdoor space, and off-site field trips, as well as the knowledge and experience of staff and other students. Staff and students have an equal voice at the School Meeting, which occurs several times each week and determines the day-to-day operations of the school.

School rules are compiled into a rule book that is enforced by the Justice Committee. Every member of the school participates in Justice Committee, which is a daily meeting of students and staff. All decisions about rule making, discipline, suspensions, expulsions, etc. are made democratically, with each member of the school having an equal vote.

== History ==
Three Rivers Village School opened in fall of 2013 in the Stanton Heights neighborhood. The school was founded by a group of parents and teachers including Evan Mallory and Jean Marie Pearce. After two years of operation, the school moved in 2015 from its original Stanton Heights location to the former St. Stephen's School building in the Hazelwood section of the city.

== See also ==
- List of democratic schools
- Democratic education
- Education reform
