= Warehouse Cooperative School =

Defunct school in Massachusetts, United States

The Warehouse Cooperative School (1969-1975) was an American free school / alternative school which flourished in and near Boston in the late 1960s and early 1970s.

Founded by Knowles Dougherty and his wife, Darlene Dougherty, as a K-12 school, the Warehouse School was in the tradition of A.S. Neill's Summerhill School and other free schools in allowing an extreme amount of personal choice to students. Older students could choose which classes to attend or whether to attend classes at all. Within that context, the student was entirely responsible for whether they considered their learning satisfactory, as no grades were given. Nor were students segregated into grades; the only classifications were primary, intermediate, and secondary. Primary students had more guidance and restrictions than middle and secondary students.

Learning at the Warehouse School did not occur in classrooms but in assorted ad hoc groupings of students and faculty in various formal and informal short- or long-term settings.

Borrowing from Real Great Society (an outgrowth of a research project carried out in conjunction with Charles W. Slack's work toward his Ph.D. at Harvard), there was a big bulletin board where a schedule for all the classes/groups was posted. Classes ranged from French to Math to Woodworking.

The Warehouse School was named for its open-plan physical plant. After its early years, it moved into a former factory, which contained some classrooms but mainly was an ample hangar-like open space. This allowed students, faculty, and community members to construct or deconstruct spaces to serve current needs and desires.

As part of its cooperative model, parents or guardians of students were required to donate time to the school. This allowed the school to draw upon the skills of community members for teaching or other activities, involved parents closely in their child's education, and fostered group cohesion.

A general comparison may be made to the Sudbury Valley School, founded in the same area almost simultaneously. The two schools differed in many significant particulars, though.

Never financially secure, the Warehouse School folded in 1975.

Warehouse School graduates include Susan Butcher, noted as a female Iditarod Trail Sled Dog Race champion. Former faculty include naturalist and author Don Stokes and botanist Peter Del Tredici.

== Related publications ==
- Hurwitz, Al, editor. The Warehouse Cooperative School, Programs for Promise(Harcourt & Brace, 1972)
- Allen, Ed, editor. The Warehouse Cooperative School, The Responsive House, (Boston, MIT Press, 1974)
- Dougherty, Knowles, author. "An Analysis of the Effectiveness of an Alternative School in Meeting the Needs of Several Types of Students Whose Needs Were Not Met in Traditional Schools", (Ph.D. Dissertation, Harvard University, 1973)
