= José Francisco Pacheco =

Portuguese educator (born 1951)

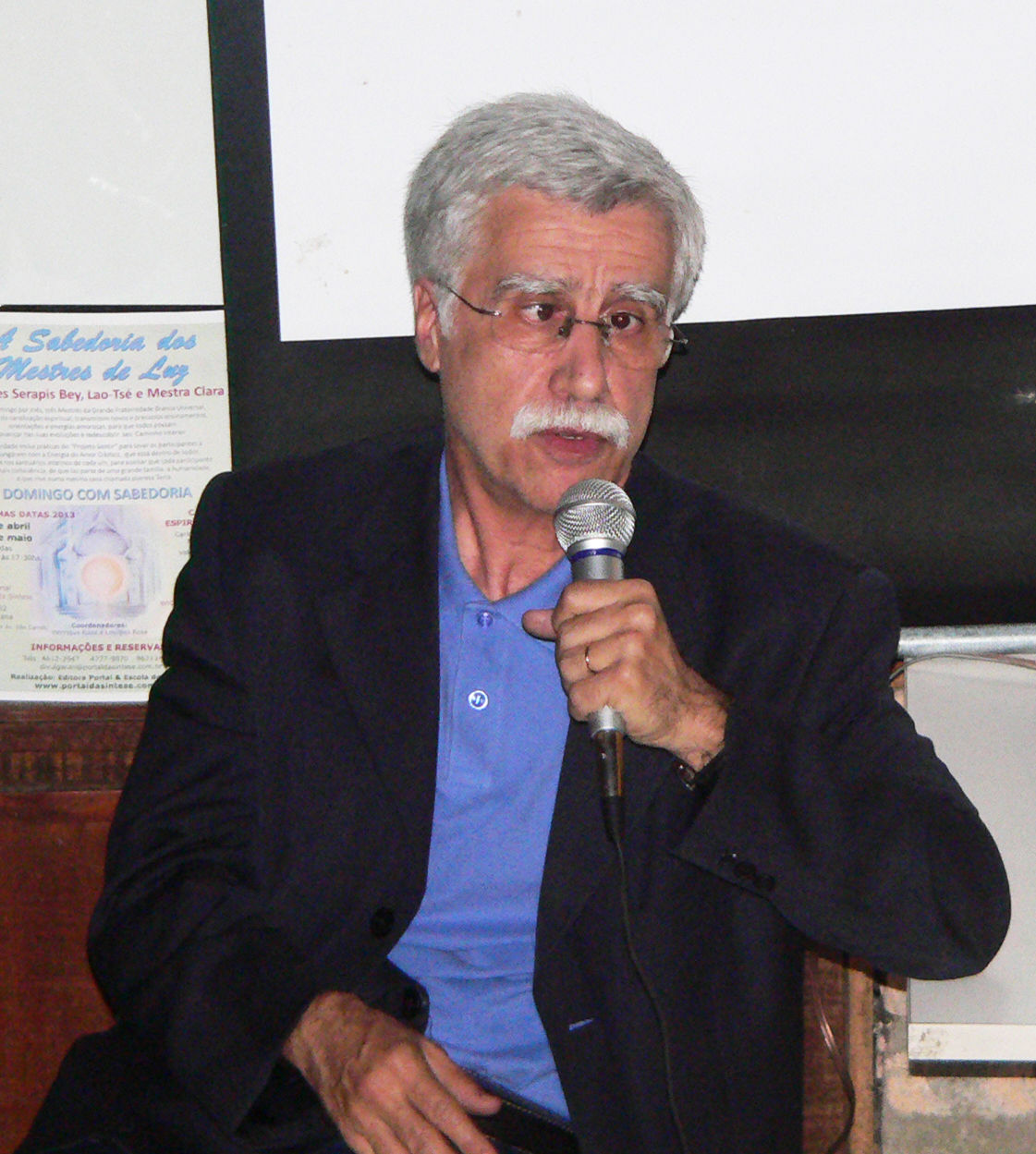
José Pacheco conducting a lecture in Cotia, Brazil (2012).

José Francisco de Almeida Pacheco (born 1951) is a Portuguese educator who pioneered a school called Escola da Ponte (Bridge School), in Vila das Aves, Portugal. He is also a published writer, with some books and a wide range of articles.

== Biography ==
Specialist in Music and Literacy, he holds a master's degree in Science of Education by the School of Psychology and Education of the University of Porto (Universidade do Porto).

Pacheco was the principal of Escola da Ponte since 1976, which was founded by him. The school has international prestige for its innovation and good inclusive practices. Pacheco is the author of several books and articles on Educational practice.

He has been living in Brazil for the last ten years, attracted by the bigger innovative movement in the area of education and schooling.

== Award ==
- 2004: In May was awarded by the President of Portugal Jorge Sampaio with the Ordem da Instrução Pública, which is one of the honorific orders of Portugal. This is the attribution of decoration to individuals personal bravery, achievement, or service to Portugal.

== Books ==
- PACHECO, José. (2000) Quando eu for grande, quero ir à Primavera. Ed. Didática Suplegraf.
- PACHECO, José. (2003) Sózinhos na Escola. Ed. Didática Suplegraf.
- PACHECO, José. (2006) Caminhos para a Inclusão, Artmed Editora.
