= The Clearwater School =

Coordinates: 47°49′12″N 122°12′42″W

- 1510 196th St SE, Bothell, Washington, United States

Information
- Type: Sudbury school
- Established: 1996
- Age range: 4 - 19
- Enrollment: 90
- Campus: Suburban
- Campus size: 3.4 acres (14,000 m^{2})
- Information: (425) 489-2050
- Philosophy: Sudbury
- Governance: School Meeting (democratic, vote by students and staff)
- Website: https://clearwaterschool.com/

The Clearwater School is an independent school in Bothell, Washington, a northern suburb of Seattle, Washington, United States. Clearwater is a Sudbury school that serves students from ages 4 to 19.

The school began in 1996 as a twice-weekly homeschool cooperative, and opened as a full-time school in 1999. In 2006 the school moved to its current campus in Bothell.

== Philosophy ==
Clearwater is a democratic school where students create the rules and policies that affect the entire school. The educational philosophy is similar to unschooling in that student-chosen activities are the primary means of learning.

== Curriculum ==
Clearwater students explore their own interests at their own pace. Students are not segregated by age and are free to determine how they spend their time. The school has no assignments, no grades, and no classes unless students organize them.

== Facilities ==
The school's campus consists of five buildings on 3.4 acres and includes a kitchen, an art room, a music room, a theater, a computer room, an office, a library, an active room, and quiet areas. The school also has a play yard, and North Creek flows through the campus.

The school has an ongoing partnership with Snohomish County for ecological restoration of North Creek for salmon and other wildlife.

The campus generates solar energy using a photovoltaic system as part of the school's commitment to sustainable practices.

== Government ==
The democratic structure of the school gives students a direct say in how the school is managed. Students and staff members each have a vote in School Meeting, where rules and policies are created, and in Judicial Committee, where rules are enforced.

== Staff ==
The adults at Clearwater are called staff, to distinguish their role from the role of traditional teachers. Staff members do not tell students how they should spend their time; instead they play, encourage, and learn alongside students.

== See also ==
- List of democratic schools
- Democratic education
- Education reform
