= Escola da Ponte =

Escola da Ponte (English: School of the Bridge) is an open plan school in an elementary school, located in São Tomé de Negrelos, Portugal, which was started by José Francisco Pacheco in 1976 and follows the principles of democratic education. The school is organized and totally run by students, mainly governed by a weekly deliberative assembly with them and the professors and the parents. Students also there are not divided in classes but in dynamic groups, and they choose what to study having as the main criteria, what they want to learn.

It has embodied Meaningful Student Involvement in classrooms successfully.
