= Neue Schule Hamburg =

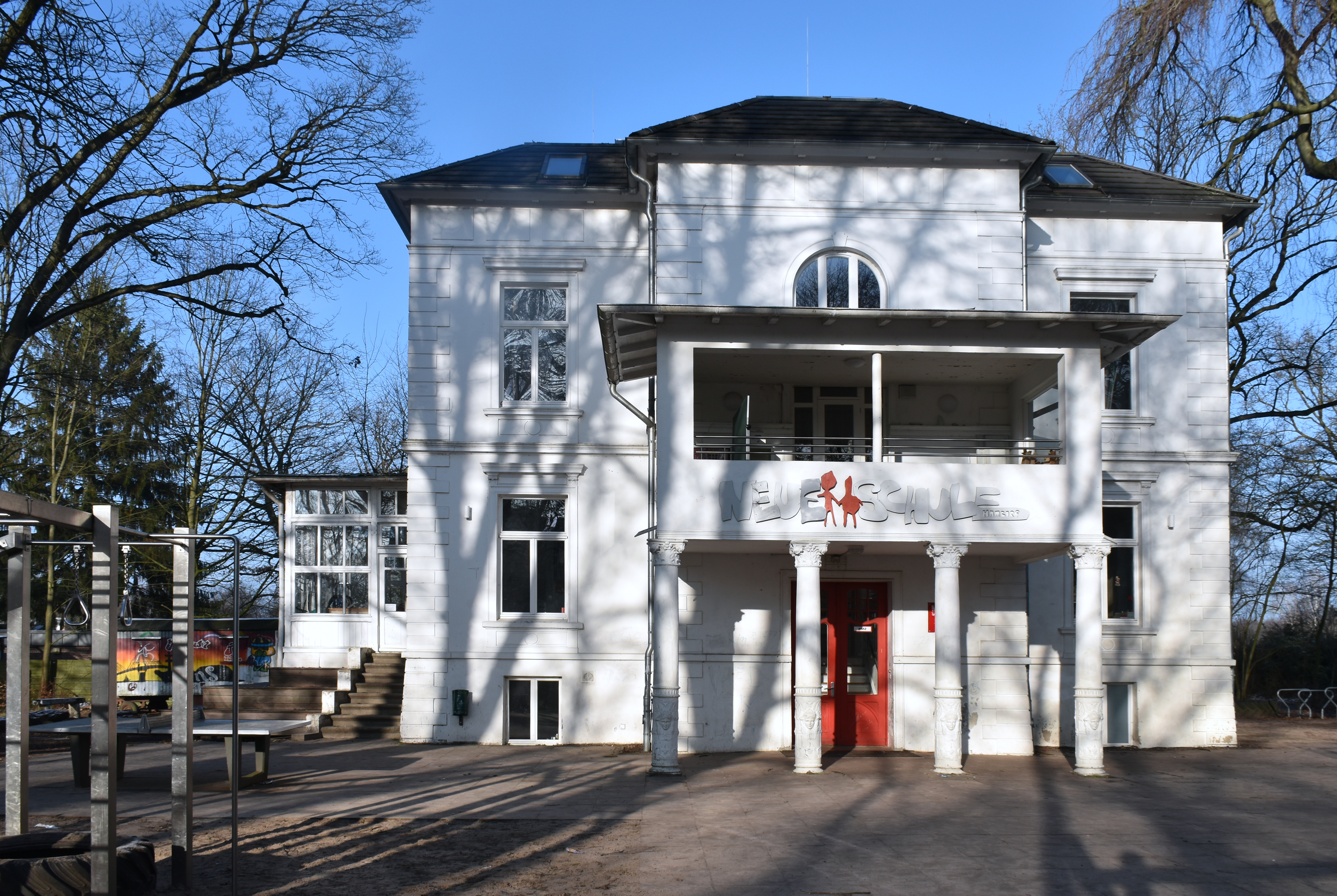

Location
- Schimmelreiterweg 11; Rahlstedt; Hamburg 22149; Germany; 53°35′30.9″N 10°10′51.7″E

Information
- School type: Private with state contribution, Sudbury school
- Established: 2007
- Founder: Philipp Palm; Nena; Silke Steinfadt; Thomas Simmerl
- Authority: Hamburg
- Director: Philipp Palm
- Pädagogischer Leiter: Björn Steffen
- Teaching staff: 10
- Gender: Coeducational
- Age: 6 to 18
- Enrollment: c. 80 (2010)
- Classes: None
- Website: www.neue-schule-hamburg.org

Neue Schule Hamburg (English: New School Hamburg) is a private Sudbury school in Rahlstedt, Hamburg, Germany, established in 2007.

== History ==
The school was founded by Philipp Palm, who was the school's principal, his partner the German popstar Nena Kerner, Silke Steinfadt and Thomas Simmerl in September 2007 in Rahlstedt with 85 pupils and six teachers. It was the first school in Germany to be organised on the Sudbury school concept. Setting out her rationale for helping establish the school, Nena referred to her own "uninspiring" education, explaining that, "When I was a child, like all children, I had so many ideas and so much curiosity. I wanted to take on the world but the teachers were the ruling force. That doesn't encourage children; it represses them."

During the first year, there were reports of theft and violence at the school. However, after three years, it was recognised by the Hamburg school authority as a state-approved substitute school (German: staatlich genehmigte Ersatzschule), and the Hamburg school authority agreed to contribute to the running costs from 2011. In 2010, the school had increased the number of teachers to ten.
