= The Group School =

The Group School was an alternative high school in Cambridge, Massachusetts, United States, in the 1970s. Operating under democratic-school principles, the Group School was established primarily to serve students from working-class and low-income backgrounds.

In 1977, the school described its educational themes as "internal democracy" and an "emphasis on helping youth develop a sense of working-class identity and pride." Founders believed that traditional educational approaches undermined working-class identity by forcing working-class students "to deny their neighborhood ties" and "to ignore or denigrate the knowledge they have picked up on the street." The school developed curricula aimed at reversing this process, in part through course units on family, immigration, and labor history and courses emphasized working-class youths' "ability to control their own lives and to change their communities." Radical teachers also developed feminist-oriented curricula in concert with female students, in an attempt, as Kathleen Weiler reports, to use "the life experiences of working-class girls to draw out themes of race, class, and gender for critical analysis."
