= The New School of Northern Virginia =

Coordinates: 38.°N 77.°W

Location
- 9431 Silver King Court; Fairfax, VA; USA; 38.°N 77.°W

Information
- Type: Private
- Established: 1988
- Founder: John Potter
- Faculty: 20
- Grades: 6 through 12
- Enrollment: 125
- Average class size: 12
- Student to teacher ratio: 5:1
- Campus: Suburban
- Colors: Orange & Blue
- Athletics: 4 interscholastic
- Accreditation: SACS/SAIS
- Website: The New School of Northern Virginia

The New School of Northern Virginia (also referred to simply as "The New School") is an independent, private school serving grades 6-12 located in Fairfax, Virginia. Their goal is for their students to independently own their education. The New School is small by design, with 120 students and 26 teachers and staff, all of whom are on a first-name basis.

== History ==
The New School of Northern Virginia was founded in 1989 by John Potter. The school opened in Vienna, Virginia with 14 students in kindergarten through ninth grade. As of 2020, the school comprises four buildings: the main office building featuring the gym, media center, black box theatre, and classrooms, two academic buildings, and a science center.

In 1993, the school moved to its current location in Fairfax, Virginia.

In 2007, the school added facilities including a gymnasium, black box theater, a library and art studio.

== Philosophy ==
The New School is known for a teaching style based around essential questions and critical thinking, with a focus on student-centered learning. Teachers use tools of authentic assessment (portfolios, exhibitions, performances, projects, presentations, essays, and more) to evaluate the academic growth and achievement of each student.

== Academics ==
The New School is a college-preparatory school that trains its students in the traditional academic disciplines (English, science, social studies, foreign language, and mathematics), and essential skill categories for success in college and the professional world. These essential skill categories are a fundamental component of the school's pedagogy and culture.

=== Portfolios ===
At The New School, students are required to complete a portfolio that demonstrates the student's understanding of the Essential Skills. The portfolio should contain some of the student's projects, papers, and other school related items. These items are used to prove the student's understanding of the six essential skills, as well as show what the student has learned over the year, and how they have grown as a person. Every year, the students of The New School will present their portfolios to a committee. This committee includes the student's advisor and parents or guardians, and at least one other faculty member. Importantly, students must pass the junior-year review to obtain senior status and begin working on their Senior Exhibition.

=== International Program ===
The New School offers an English for Speakers of Other Languages Program for international students who are at a low level of English and hold a F-1 student VISA. All first year international students must attend an orientation program for two weeks. Students may be exempted from the program if they pass the English language proficiency test administered during the orientation program.

The International Orientation Program is divided into two one-week sessions. During the first week, students are introduced to the layout of the school, the student handbook, and the daily schedule. In addition, all required office documentation will be completed. Introductions to the staff, teachers, and administration will also be done during this week. Students will take a math placement test, select classes for their school year, and have their photos taken for school ID cards.

During the second week of orientation, students will be instructed to practice English and be assessed after teaching with writing, reading, speaking, and listening methods, and each student’s performance on these, as well as their overall interaction and participation during the week, will be used to decide in which level of English the student will enroll. In addition to English instruction, students will continue to be introduced to the school and other students.

== Arts and Drama ==
Before the completion of the John Swayze black box theater in 2007, The New School's productions were very small and limited. The theater houses student and professional productions every year.

| Year | Name | Review |
|---|---|---|
| 2024 | Red Herring | |
| 2023 | The Glass Menagerie | |
| 2022 | The Alibis | |
| 2020 | 10 out of 12 | |
| 2019 | Almost Maine | |
| 2017 | The Outsiders | |
| 2015 | The Laramie Project | Review |
| 2014 | Neo Cabaret | |
| 2013 | The Killing Game | Review |
| 2012 | The Adding Machine | Review |
| 2011 | Wonderland | Review |
| 2010 | Commedia dell'Arte | Review |
| 2009 | The Bacchae | Review |
| 2008 | A History of American Film | Review |
| 2007 | Arabian Nights | |

== Student life ==
If a student is interested in a topic, one can easily form a club and set up a schedule for meetings.

The student-teacher dynamic is collegial at The New School. Students may refer to teachers by their first name: students and teachers are encouraged to interact as equals.

== Sports ==
The New School has four varsity sports teams: co-ed soccer, girls' volleyball, co-ed volleyball, co-ed basketball, and co-ed softball. These teams compete with other local private schools.

== Awards ==
The New School of Northern Virginia was named one of the Washington area's top 10 schools by The Washington Post in April 2005.
