= Mitsubishi Materials chemical plant explosion =

2014 industrial accident in Yokkaichi, Japan

- Date: 9 January 2014
- Location: Yokkaichi, Mie, Japan
- Deaths: 5
- Injuries: 17

On 9 January 2014, an explosion occurred at a Mitsubishi Materials chemical plant in Yokkaichi, Mie, Japan, killing at least five people and injuring 17 others.
