= Mont-Libre Agile Learning Centre =

Quebec's first independent democratic learning centre - located in Montreal, Canada

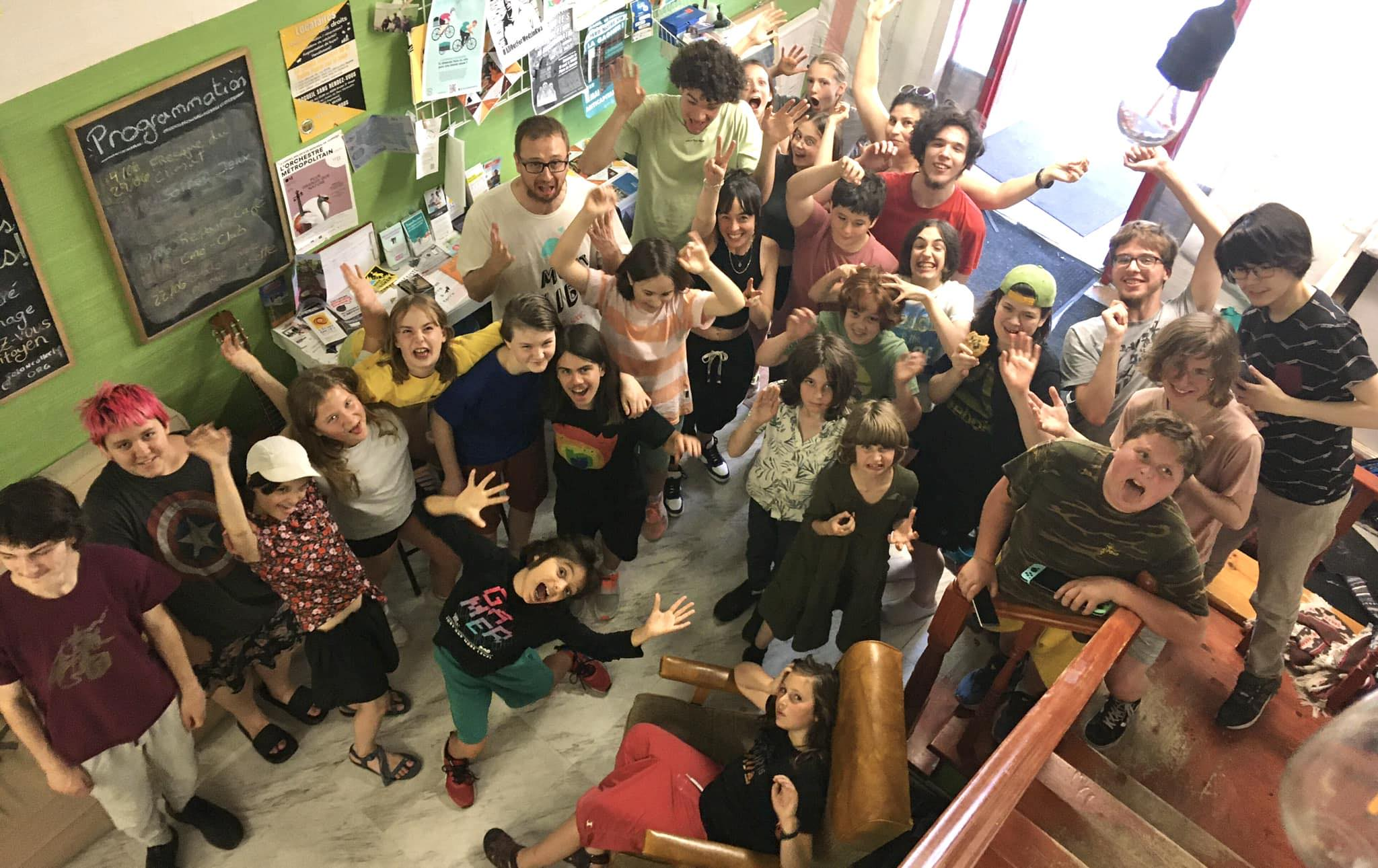
- Mont-Libre Agile Learning Centre on Plaza Saint-Hubert

Location
- 6790, Saint-Hubert; Montreal, Quebec; Canada

Information
- Other name: Mont-Libre
- School type: Independent Democratic
- Established: January 9, 2017
- Category: Democratic
- Director: Marc-Alexandre Prud'homme
- Gender: Coeducational
- Age range: 6 to 18 years

Mont-Libre Agile Learning Centre (Mont-Libre) is an independent (i.e. fee-charging) inclusive multi-age and bilingual democratic learning centre servicing children who are registered for homeschooling in Quebec, Canada.

Mont-Libre was founded on January 9th, 2017. It is the first democratic learning centre of its kind in Quebec. The centre is located in the urban borough of La Petite Patrie, Montreal.

== Philosophy and educational structure ==
Similar to the democratic free school, Summerhill, Mont-Libre is a part of the radical alternative education movement. Following the tenets of democratic learning centres, Mont-Libre features a child-centred and participatory approach to learning in the context of primary and secondary education.

Mont-Libre's community decision-making processes are organised via democratic assemblies. These assemblies are opportunities for equal opportunity decision-making by both the youth and the staff members. The assemblies direct the culture and educational climate of the centre. Mont-Libre follows the philosophical principles of unschooling with self-directed learning, non-violent communication, transformative justice, a love of learning and community involvement. Community members attending the centre are free to explore their own interests as long as they do not encroach negatively on others.

"By embracing the unschooling philosophy, you must have deep faith that a child placed in a healthy and enriching environment will develop to their full potential on their own. You, as an adult, can create all the circumstances that will help them."

— Christine Perry, former special education teacher, volunteer, and mother of two children enrolled at Mont-Libre,

In September 2025, Mont-Libre began to include younger children between the ages of six to nine for one day a week. The remaining four days of the week are reserved for youth bewtween the ages of nine to eighteen.

The educators at Mont-Libre include Christine Perry, Daniel Stee, Hyon Stee and Marc-Alexandre Prud'homme.
