= The Circle School =

School in Harrisburg, Pennsylvania, US

Coordinates: 40.273399°N 76.829887°W

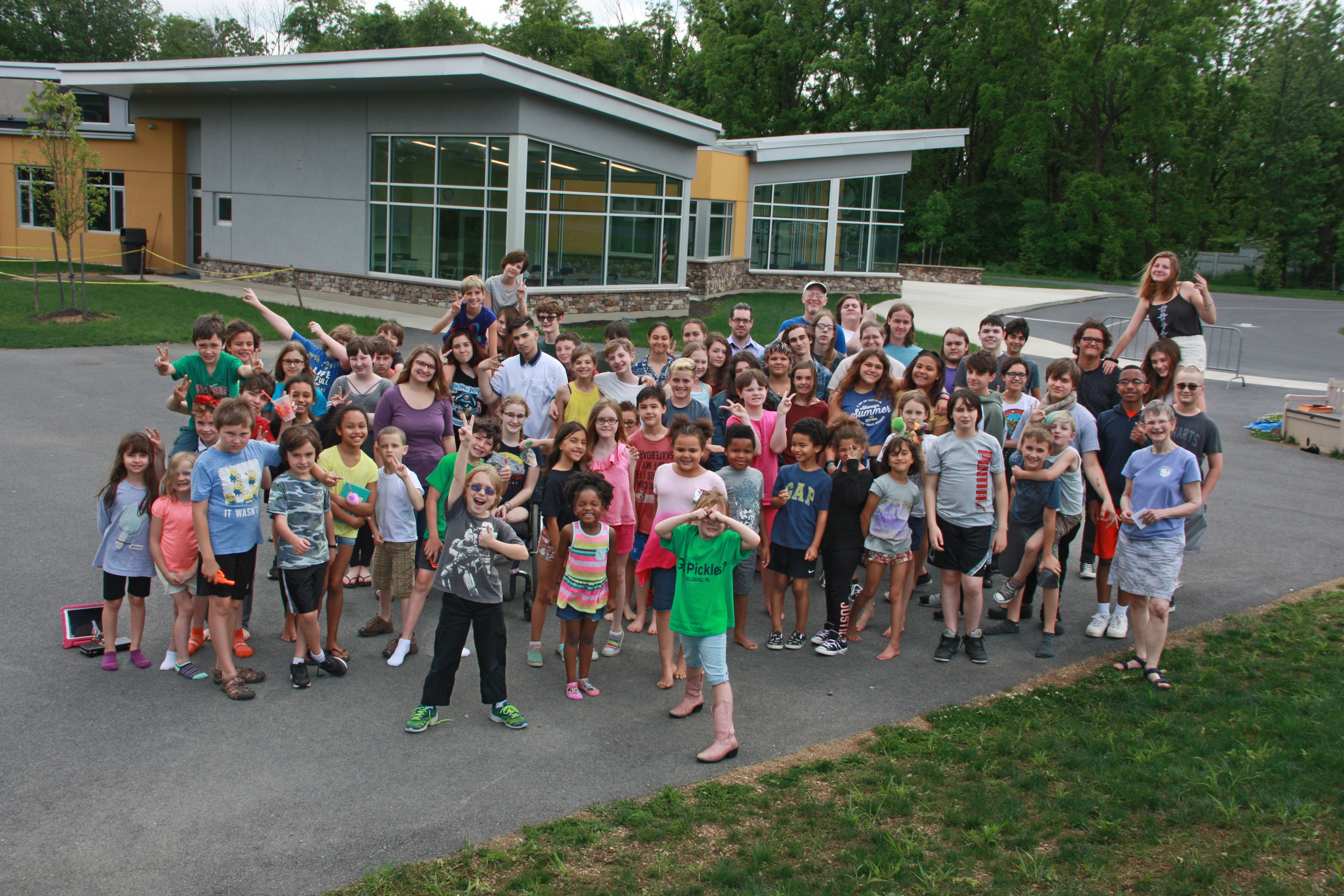
- The Circle School, Harrisburg Pennsylvania, US, 2019
- Harrisburg, PA

Information
- Founded: 1984
- Age range: 4-19
- Enrollment: 47
- Philosophy: Democratic education
- Website: https://www.circleschool.org

The Circle School is a self-directed democratic school in Harrisburg, Pennsylvania, founded in 1984. It enrolls pre-kindergarten through high school age children. The Circle School is one of three Sudbury-like schools in Pennsylvania, where students have complete responsibility for their own education, and the school is run by a direct democracy in which students and staff are equal citizens.

== History ==
Jim Rietmulder founded The Circle School in September 1984 with co-directors Beth Stone and Sue Harten-MacAdam, starting with three students. The school was founded as an innovative pre-school and elementary school, emphasizing children's social, emotional, spiritual and physical development as well as academics.

In 1997 The Circle School added high school grades and has ever since included all grades, pre-kindergarten through high school.

In 2003, The Circle School successfully challenged a Pennsylvania law requiring students to either recite the Pledge of Allegiance or sing the national anthem daily.

"The U.S. Court of Appeals for the Third Circuit struck down a Pennsylvania statute that required notification to a parent when any child refused to salute the flag or recite the Pledge. The statute at issue in Circle School stated:

Students may decline to recite the Pledge of Allegiance and may refrain from saluting the flag on the basis of religious conviction or personal belief. The supervising officer of a school subject to the requirements of this subsection shall provide written notification to the parents or guardian of any student who declines to recite the Pledge of Allegiance or who refrains from saluting the flag."

In 2017 the school officially moved to its current location, a new 9,000 square foot building on an 8-acre campus in Harrisburg, Pennsylvania. On about 8 acres of land donated by the George M. Leader Family Corp., the school has "an absence of classrooms". Instead, the school building has been planned to include a "courtroom" to accommodate "hearings within the school's judicial system", and a large "public commons" for the school's governing body.

== Educational method ==
The Circle School's model of schooling has two defining characteristics:

- First, the students are free to spend their time as they choose, engaging in any activity they wish (reading, playing video games, climbing trees, conversing, studying, playing harpsichord, etc.). They only must follow the rules and they must do a chore each day. Reitmulder has said, "One of the most commonly violated rules, maybe the most commonly violated, is a rule that says, 'Clean up your own messes.' If you make a mess... you've got to clean it up, you can't leave a mess... And we have a rule that requires everyone to do a daily housekeeping chore, a number of civic duties, and that would be one of them."
- Second, the school is run democratically on a one-person, one vote-model. All the "day-to-day" affairs of the school are governed by a democratic body called the School Meeting. There, decisions are made concerning such things as creating, repealing or amending rules, all aspects of managing the school, suspending and expelling students. Rietmulder has described the democratic process, "In self-directed democratic schools, kids practice life in a microcosm of society, empowered as voters, bound by laws, challenged by choice, supported by community, and driven by nature".

== Research ==
A 2015 study found that 2% of former students were unemployed and 13% were self-employed.
