= Peter Gray (psychologist) =

American researcher and scholar

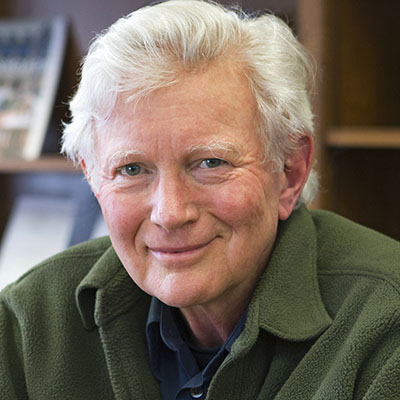
- Education: Columbia University (BA); Rockefeller University (PhD)
- Scientific career
- Fields: Psychology
- Workplaces: Boston College

Peter Otis Gray is an American psychology researcher and scholar. He is a research professor of psychology at Boston College, and the author of an introductory psychology textbook. Gray's research explores the relationship between neuroendocrinology, developmental psychology, anthropology and education. He is known for his work on the interaction between education and play, and for his evolutionary perspective on psychology theory.

== Education and career ==
Peter Gray grew up in the 1950s in a series of small towns in Minnesota and Wisconsin. He graduated in 1962 from Cabot School in Cabot, Vermont. He then majored in psychology at Columbia College in New York City and graduated magna cum laude. His experiences working at camps and recreation centers in high school and college helped to shape his future academic interests in play and child development. He received his PhD in biological sciences from Rockefeller University in 1972, and, in that same year, joined the Psychology Department at Boston College. There he moved up the ranks from Assistant to Associate to Full Professor, serving at various times as department chair, director of the undergraduate program, and director of the graduate program. In 2002 he retired from his teaching position and accepted the appointment he now holds, as research professor.

Gray is the author of a widely used introductory psychology textbook, now in its eighth edition (joined by coauthor David Bjorklund beginning with the 7th edition). The book broke new ground when the first edition was published (in 1991) as the first general introductory psychology textbook that brought a Darwinian perspective to the entire field. He is also author of Free to Learn: Why Unleashing the Instinct to Play Will Make Our Children Happier, More Self-Reliant, and Better Students for Life, and he writes a popular blog for Psychology Today magazine entitled "Freedom to Learn".

In 2016, Gray helped to found the Alliance for Self-Directed Education, an organization which promotes self-directed education for children and teenagers as replacement for traditional schooling. He served as president of the organization, stepping down in 2020. In 2017, Gray helped to found Let Grow, a non-profit organization which promotes childhood independence and pushes back against the model of helicopter parenting.

In a 2026 article in The Atlantic, Gray argued that mobile phones and social media are not the leading causes behind rising mental health issues among adolescents. He disagreed with Jonathan Haidt's book, The Anxious Generation, noting it "made him mad" and that the narrative that digital technology is to blame for a mental health epidemic among teens is "unethical". Instead, Gray argues that the over-organization of childhood by schools and families is putting too much stress on kids.

== Books ==
- Gray, Peter (March 5, 2013). Free to Learn: Why Unleashing the Instinct to Play Will Make Our Children Happier, More Self-Reliant, and Better Students for Life. Basic Books. ISBN 978-0-465-03791-9.
- Narváez, Darcia; Valentino, Kristin; Fuentes, Agustin; McKenna, James J.; Gray, Peter, eds. (2014). Ancestral Landscapes in Human Evolution: Culture, Childrearing and Social Wellbeing. Oxford University Press. ISBN 978-0-19-996425-3.
- Gray, Peter; Bjorklund, David (2018). Psychology: 8th Edition. Macmillan Learning. ISBN 978-1-319-15051-8.
- Gray, Peter (2020). Four books, all published by Tipping Points Press (publishing arm of the Alliance for Self-Directed Education), and adapted from blog posts in Gray's Freedom to Learn blog:
  - Mother Nature's Pedagogy: Biological Foundations for Children's Self-Directed Education, ISBN 978-1-952837-06-7
  - Evidence that Self-Directed Education Works, ISBN 9781952837029
  - The Harm of Coercive Schooling, ISBN 9781952837005
  - How Children Acquire "Academic" Skills Without Formal Instruction, ISBN 9781952837043
- Gray, Peter (2026). Restoring Childhood: How to Set Kids Free in the Age of Anxiety. ISBN 979-8-217-04643-0
