= Sudbury Valley School =

Private school in the United States

The Sudbury Valley School
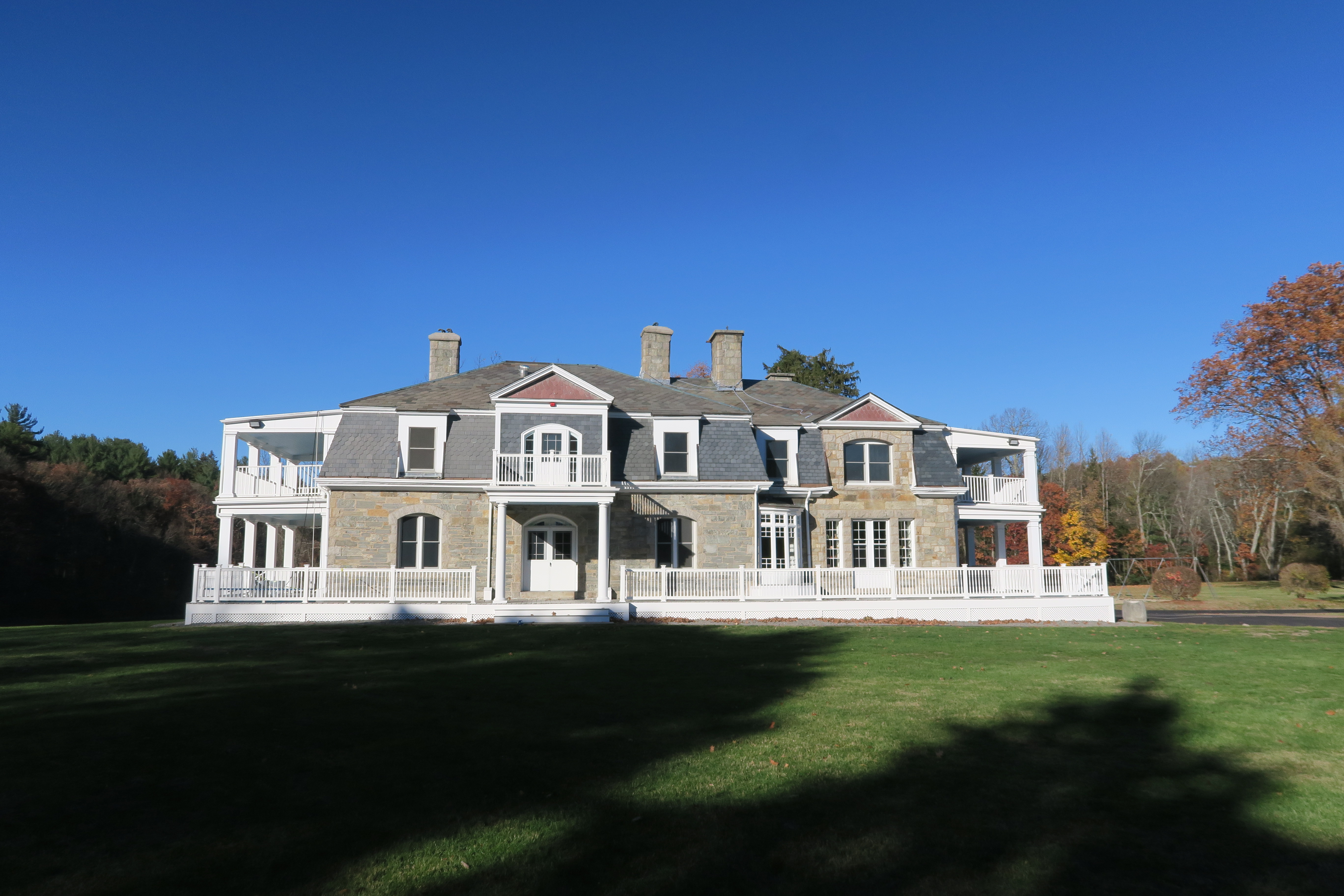
- 2 Winch Street, Framingham, Massachusetts; United States

Information
- Type: Private
- Established: 1968
- Chairperson: Madison Ranieri
- Secretary: Dacey Campbell
- Treasurer: Scott Gray
- Faculty: 8
- Age range: 4–19
- Enrollment: 70
- Campus size: 10 acres (40,000 m^{2})
- Campus type: Suburban
- Annual tuition: $9500–$12000
- Philosophy: Sudbury
- Governance: School Meeting (democratic, vote by students and staff)
- Website: http://www.sudburyvalley.org

The Sudbury Valley School is a private school founded in 1968 by a community of people in Framingham, Massachusetts, United States. As of 2019, several schools, located in the United States, Australia, Belgium, Canada, France and Germany were based on the Sudbury Model in the United States, Australia, Belgium, Canada, France, Germany, Israel, Japan and Switzerland.

The school is considered a Democratic School and has three basic tenets: educational freedom, democratic governance and personal responsibility. It is a private school, attended by children from the ages of 4 to 19.

== History ==
Sudbury Valley School was founded in 1968 by a community of people including Daniel Greenberg, Joan Rubin, Mimsy Sadofsky and Hanna Greenberg in Framingham. Greenberg aimed to create a school system that was just, psychologically comfortable, and self-governing with real-life being the primary source of learning. The school started in the summer of 1968 with 130 students enrolled in a trial summer session before the school year started in September. During the summer session, there were two notable flaws: the smorgasbord plan in offering a variety of ways of information that the students could access if they wished; and the staffing. Of the initial 130 students, about half enrolled in the school year, ages 4 to 17.

The 1990s saw an expansion of the Sudbury Model throughout the US and abroad.

== The school ==
=== Facilities ===
There are no traditional classrooms and no traditional classes; instead, children are free to do what they wish with their time. This may or may not include formally exploring academia or speaking with staff members or other students about academic interests, as part of educating themselves.

=== Curriculum ===
The school has no required academic activities and no academic expectations for completion of one's time at the school. Students are free to spend their time as they wish.

=== Government ===
Students are given responsibility for their own education. The school is a direct democracy in which students and staff are equals. The corporation is wholly owned and operated by the School Meeting, in which each student and each elected member of the staff has one vote.

=== Staff ===
There is no tenure at Sudbury Valley School. The School Meeting, with each participant receiving one vote, hires staff, as part of its duties in running the school. Every year, in the spring, elections are held for next year's staff. School Meeting members (staff and students) may nominate people to the role of staff. The School Meeting debates the school's staff needs, and discusses each candidate in turn. There is an election with secret paper ballots which is open to all students and staff. Staff who have received more yes votes than no votes in this election are eligible to receive contracts negotiated on the floor of the School Meeting.

== Alumni ==
After professor Peter Gray published the first study of Sudbury Valley School alumni in 1986, the school has published two studies of their alumni (in the years 1992 and 2005). There have, as yet, been no formal studies of graduates of other Sudbury schools, but, anecdotally, they seem to have similar results. Laura Poitras is an alumna.

== See also ==
- Sudbury school
- List of Sudbury schools
- Autodidacticism
- Alternative education
- Free school movement
- Democratic School
- Summerhill School
