= Sudbury school =

Type of democratic education

A Sudbury school is a type of school, usually for the K-12 age range, where students have complete responsibility for their own education, and the school is run by a direct democracy in which students and staff are equal citizens. Students use their time however they wish, and learn as a by-product of ordinary experience rather than through coursework. There is no predetermined educational syllabus, prescriptive curriculum or standardized instruction. The adults are referred to simply as staff rather than teachers.

This is a form of democratic education and fulfills the criteria of a democratic school.

== Definition ==
Daniel Greenberg, one of the founders of the original Sudbury Model school, writes that the two things that distinguish a Sudbury Model school are that everyone is treated equally (adults and children together) and that there is no authority other than that granted by the consent of the governed.

While each Sudbury Model school operates independently and determines their own policies and procedures, they share a common culture.

Sudbury Valley Schools give full responsibility for the learning process to the student. In addition, the school is a direct democracy in which students and teachers participate equally in the school.

== Etymology and spread ==
The name "Sudbury" originates from the Sudbury Valley School, founded in 1968 in Framingham, Massachusetts, near Sudbury, Massachusetts. Though there is no formal or regulated definition of a Sudbury Model school, there are now more than 60 schools that identify themselves with Sudbury around the world. Some, though not all, include "Sudbury" in their name. These schools operate as independent entities and are not formally associated in any way.

== Underlying beliefs ==
Sudbury schools are based on:

1. The educational belief that children are extremely good at (and therefore do not need to be taught) the main behaviors they will need as adults, such as creativity, imagination, alertness, curiosity, thoughtfulness, responsibility, and judgement. What children lack is experience, which can be gained if adults guide students in open ways.
2. The sociopolitical belief that having full democratic rights in childhood is the best way to become an adult who is comfortable functioning within a democracy.

"The fundamental premises of the school are simple: that all people are curious by nature; that the most efficient, long-lasting, and profound learning takes place when started and pursued by the learner; that all people are creative if they are allowed to develop their unique talents; that age-mixing among students promotes growth in all members of the group; and that freedom is essential to the development of personal responsibility."

== School democracy ==
All aspects of governing a Sudbury school are determined by the weekly school meeting, modeled after the traditional New England town meeting. School Meeting passes, amends and repeals school rules, manages the school's budget, and decides on hiring and firing of staff. Each individual present—including students and staff—has an equal vote, and most decisions are made by simple majority.

School rules are normally compiled in a law book, updated repeatedly over time, which forms the school's code of law. Usually, there is a set procedure to handle complaints, and most of the schools follow guidelines that respect the idea of due process of law. There are usually rules requiring an investigation, a hearing, a trial, a sentence, and allowing for an appeal, generally following the philosophy that students face the consequences of their own behavior.

== Learning ==
The Sudbury pedagogical philosophy may be summarized as the following: Learning is a natural by-product of all human activity. Learning is self-initiated and self-motivated.

The educational model states that there are many ways to learn and that learning is a process someone does, not a process that is done to him or her; According to the model the presence and guidance of a teacher is not necessary.

The free exchange of ideas and free conversation and interplay between people provides broad exposure to areas that may prove relevant and interesting to students. Students are of all mixed ages. The older students learn from younger students and vice versa. The presence of older students provides role models, both positive and negative, for younger students. The pervasiveness of play has led to a recurring observation by first-time visitors to a Sudbury school that the students appear to be in perpetual "recess".

Implicitly and explicitly, students are given responsibility for their own education: The only person designing what a student will learn is the student. Exceptions are when a student asks for a particular class or arranges an apprenticeship. Sudbury schools do not compare or rank students—the school requires no tests, evaluations, or transcripts.

Reading is treated the same as any other subject: Students learn to read when they choose, or simply by going about their lives.

"Only a few kids seek any help at all when they decide to learn. Each child seems to have their own method. Some learn from being read to, memorizing the stories and then ultimately reading them. Some learn from cereal boxes, others from game instructions, others from street signs. Some teach themselves letter sounds, others syllables, others whole words. To be honest, we rarely know how they do it, and they rarely tell us."

Sudbury Valley School claims that all of their students have learned to read. While students learn to read at a wide variety of ages, there appears to be no drawback to learning to read later: No one who meets their older students could guess the age at which they first learned to read.

== Comparison with related models ==
The model differs in some ways from other types of democratic schools and free schools, but there are many similarities:

- De-emphasis of classes: There is no curriculum or set of required courses. Instead learner interest guides things, with students studying what they want to study. There are generally no classrooms, just rooms where people choose to congregate.
- Age mixing: students are not separated into age-groups of any kind and are allowed to mix freely, interacting with those younger and older than themselves; free age-mixing is emphasized as a powerful tool for learning and development in all ages.
- Autonomous democracy: parents have limited involvement or no involvement in the school administration; Sudbury schools are run by a democratic school meeting where the students and staff participate exclusively and equally. Such meetings are also the sole authority on hiring and firing of staff, unlike most other schools.

== See also ==
- List of Sudbury schools
