= Children's rights education =

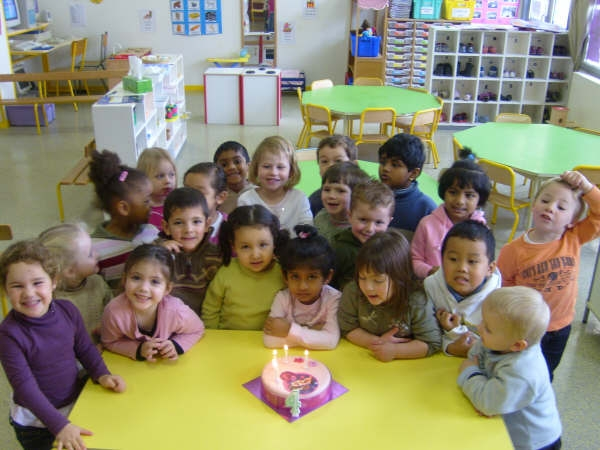
Group of children in an elementary school in Paris

Children's rights education is the teaching and practice of children's rights in schools, educational programs or institutions, as informed by and consistent with the United Nations Convention on the Rights of the Child. When fully implemented, a children's rights education program consists of both a curriculum to teach children their human rights, and framework to operate the school in a manner that respects children's rights. Articles 29 and 42 of the Convention on the Rights of the Child require children to be educated about their rights.

In addition to meeting legal obligations of the Convention to spread awareness of children’s rights to children and to adults, teaching children about their rights has the benefits of improving their awareness of rights in general, making them more respectful of other people's rights, and empowering them to take action in support of other people's rights. Early programs to teach children about their rights, in Belgium, Canada, England, and New Zealand have provided evidence of this. Children's rights were taught in schools and practiced as an ethos of "liberating the child" well before the UN Convention was written. This practice helped to inform the values and philosophy of the Convention, the IBE, and UNESCO, though the UN has not acknowledged this history or built upon its practices. This is one reasons that children's rights have not become a foundation of schools despite 100 years of struggle.

== Meaning of children’s human rights education ==
Children’s human rights education refers to education and educational practices in schools and educational institutions that are consistent with the United Nations Convention on the Rights of the Child. It is a form of education that centers on the view that children are bearers of human rights, that children are citizens in their own right, that schools and educational institutions are learning communities where children learn (or fail to learn) the values and practices of human rights and citizenship, and that educating children about their own basic human rights is a legal obligation of the United Nations Convention on the Rights of the Child.

Children's rights education is education where the rights of the child, as described in the Convention, is taught and practiced in individual classrooms. But in its most developed form, children’s rights are taught and practiced in a systematic and comprehensive way across grade levels, across the school, and across school districts. With fully implemented children’s rights education, children’s rights are not simply an addition to a particular subject or classroom. Rather, the rights of the child are incorporated into the school curricula, teaching practices, and teaching materials across subjects and grade levels, and they are the centerpiece of school mission statements, behavior codes, and school policies and practices.

Fully developed children’s rights education means that all members of the school community receive education on the rights of the child. The Convention serves as a values framework for the life and functioning of the school or educational institution and for efforts to promote a more positive school climate and school culture for learning.

A core belief in children’s rights education is that when children learn about their own basic human rights, this learning serves as an important foundation for their understanding and support of human rights more broadly.

== Education and the UN Convention on the Rights of the Child ==
The Convention on the Rights of the child has important implications for the education of children. Approved by the United Nations in 1989, the Convention is the most widely ratified and most quickly ratified country in world history. Only the United States and South Sudan have yet to ratify the treaty. By ratifying the Convention, countries commit themselves to the principle that children have fundamental rights as persons and that state authorities have obligations to provide for those rights. Under the terms of the Convention, a legally binding treaty, states parties have the obligation to make their laws, policies, and practices consistent with the provisions of the Convention, if not immediately, then over time.

Several articles in the Convention address education and children’s rights education. Eugeen Verhellen divided the Convention’s provisions on education along three tracks. First is the child’s right to education on the basis of equal opportunity (article 28). This includes the right to free primary education and to accessible secondary and higher education. Second are the child’s rights in education (articles 2, 12, 13, 14, 15, and 19). This includes the right to non-discrimination, participation, protection from abuse and violence, and freedom of thought, expression, and religion. Third are the child’s rights through education (article 29 and 42). This refers to education where children are able to know and understand their rights and to develop respect for human rights, including their own human rights.

The third track of education defines an obligation by countries and education authorities to provide for children’s human rights education. Article 29 of the Convention requires that "the education of the child shall be directed to the development of respect for human rights and fundamental freedoms." This presumes knowledge and understanding of rights. Article 42 requires that countries "undertake to make the principles of the Convention widely known, by appropriate and active means, to adults and children alike."

Mindful of this duty of disseminating knowledge and recognizing its importance, the UN Committee on the Rights of the Child, the UN body responsible for monitoring the implementation of the Convention, has repeatedly urged countries to incorporate children’s rights into the school curricula and ensure that children know and understand their rights on a systematic and comprehensive basis.

== Value of children’s human rights education ==
Children’s rights education in schools fulfills the obligations of countries to respect the rights of the child and implement the provisions of the Convention. Beyond the fulfillment of a legal obligation, children’s rights education has value for children. Felisa Tibbitts suggests that child rights education can be expected to affect learners in three ways. First is in the providing of basic information and knowledge on the nature of rights and the specific rights that children are to enjoy. Children can be expected to have a more accurate and deeper understanding of rights. Second is in attitudes, values, and behaviors consistent with the understanding of rights. Children can be expected to have greater respect for the rights of others as shown in their attitudes and behaviors. Third is in empowering children to take action in support of the rights of others. Tibbitts refers to this as the "transformational model" of rights education. Children here are more likely to take a stand in preventing or redressing human rights abuses by, for example, supporting a victim of bullying and confronting a bully in the school playground.

Research by Katherine Covell and R. Brian Howe provides evidence of the above effects. Compared to children who have not received children’s rights education, children who have received children's rights education are more likely to have an accurate and adult-like understanding of rights, to understand that rights and responsibilities are related, and to display socially responsible behaviors in support of the rights of others.

== Implementation of children’s human rights education ==
=== Early initiatives ===
Many schools and children's communities around the world have been founded on the rights of children, including Janusz Korczak's rights-based Warsaw orphanage, Homer Lane's Little Commonwealth (1913) of delinquent "prisoners", and A.S. Neill's Summerhill School (1921). Inspired by Montessori, Homer Lane, and Harriet Finley Johnson, a community of teachers, educationalists, suffragists, politicians, inspectors, and cultural contributors formed a community called the New Ideals in Education Conferences (1914–37). Their founding value was "the liberation of the child"; they sought shared and celebrated examples of practice in schools, prisons, and child communities. They contributed to the "child centred" primary school.

Since the approval by the United Nations of the Convention on the Rights of the Child in 1989, various efforts have been made to provide children's rights education in schools.

Initiatives have been undertaken mainly at the level of individual classrooms and schools. Among the earliest initiatives was one in a primary school in Bruges, Belgium. This was a comprehensive child rights education project that was introduced in the early 1990s at De Vrijdagmarkt Primary School. It involved children ages 3 to 12 with the objective of educating them about the contents of the Convention, using democratic pedagogy, and ensuring child participation in the learning process. Children were taught about their rights under the Convention through a variety of media including art and poetry. Art activities included newspaper collages representing examples of rights violations. Allowance was made for child-initiated and small group activities, role-play, and group discussion. Activities were selected based on their relevance and interest to the children. Younger children, for example, learned about the right to food by creating a very large doll with illustrations of food. Older children engaged in discussions and role-play regarding rights to adoption, education, and family.

Further examples of early initiatives were in classrooms in Cape Breton, Canada, in the late 1990s. Curriculum materials based on the Convention were developed in collaboration with children and their teachers for three grade levels. At the grade 6 level (children aged 11 to 13 years), education focused on introducing child rights in terms of their relevance to the individual child. Issues included healthy living, personal safety, families and family life, drug use, and decision-making. For example, to learn about their right to protection from narcotics, students role-played children and drug dealers and examined ways of dealing with pressure to try or sell drugs. At the grade 8 level (ages 13 to 15 years), the focus was on relationships of relevance to the child. The curriculum included units on sexuality, youth justice, child abuse, and exploitation. For example, students analyzed popular song lyrics to discuss how rights in sexuality are represented in music, and they completed cartoons that involved the competing considerations of freedom of speech and rights against discrimination. The grade 12 curriculum (for ages 17 to 19) expanded the sphere of children’s rights knowledge with application to global issues. These issues included war-affected children and child labour. At this level, activities included holding a mock UN Conference on war-affected children where small groups had responsibility for representing the players at the conference, a sweatshop talk show in which groups researched child labor, a talk show to discuss their findings.

=== Hampshire, England ===
Writings about the initiative in Cape Breton schools inspired a major initiative in Hampshire County, England, called Rights, Respect and Responsibility or the RRR initiative. It is among the best known and most promising models of children’s human rights education to date. It is an initiative that features not only individual classrooms and schools but a whole school district. The RRR initiative was impelled by the recognition among senior education administrators in Hampshire of the need for a shared values framework and positive school climate for improved learning and educational outcomes. They also were motivated by their reading of the success of the rights education project in Cape Breton.

After study leave in Cape Breton, a group of Hampshire administrators and teachers decided to pilot test and then launch their own version of child rights education in Hampshire. After successful pilot testing in 2002, they officially launched RRR in 2004. To put the objectives of RRR into effect, Hampshire authorities—with funding from the Ministry of Education—devised a three-year strategic plan of implementation. This included provisions for teacher training, development of resources, and monitoring of developments. The plan was that the initiative would first be introduced in infant, primary, and junior schools and then over time, as children went into higher grades, it would be introduced in secondary schools. By 2012, in varying degrees of implementation, the majority of Hampshire schools were participating in RRR.

The overall objective of RRR was to improve educational outcomes for children by transforming school cultures, building a shared values framework based on the Convention, and promoting educational practices consistent with the Convention. Knowledge and understanding of rights, respect, and social responsibility were to provide the values framework for all school policies, classroom practices, codes of conduct, mission statements, school regulations, and school curricula. The framework was to be put into effect across the whole school – across classrooms, across grade levels, across curricula, and across school practices. Of particular importance, consistent with children’s participation rights as described in article 12 of the Convention, behavior codes, rules, and regulations were to be developed in collaboration with the children, classroom teaching was to be democratic, and children were to be provided with numerous meaningful opportunities to participate in all aspects of school functioning.

=== New Zealand ===
Initiatives in Cape Breton and Hampshire have influenced developments in other schools, school districts, and even countries. Among the more ambitious developments have been seen in New Zealand where efforts are underway to make children’s human rights education a nationwide initiative. The context for the initiative is favorable. A strong human rights theme runs through New Zealand’s Education Act, national education goals, and national administrative guidelines. In the early 2000s, initial discussions about incorporating children’s rights education into the New Zealand curriculum were given momentum by the evidence provided from the Cape Breton and Hampshire County initiatives.

Like elsewhere, educators and human rights advocates in New Zealand had been concerned with poor achievement levels, bullying, and violent behaviors that are observed among a significant minority of children in schools. And also like elsewhere, teachers and administrators have been frustrated by the range of difficult demands in schools, the fragmentation of efforts to address common problems, and the disappointing results of those efforts. Learning about successes in the Cape Breton and Hampshire initiatives, the collaborative initiative Human Rights in Education/Mana Tika Tangata (HRiE) was formed. Its aim was to develop positive school cultures on the basis of the rights of the child and to improve achievement for all children through having schools and early childhood education centers become learning communities that know, promote, and live human rights and responsibilities.

To achieve this goal, HRiE has been following the Hampshire model in using children’s rights as an overarching and integrating values framework for teaching, learning, and school management and organization. All members of the school community – school leadership, teachers and other staff, students, boards of trustees, and parents – learn about children’s rights and the responsibilities that go with them. They recognize that every member of the school community has the right to be treated with dignity and to participate in effective education. Students are formally recognized as citizens of the school and country with explicit rights and responsibilities. They participate in decision-making across the school, and rights are embedded across the curriculum, school practices, and policies.

=== Initiatives with preschool ===
Children's rights education initiatives also have occurred at the preschool level. For example, Canadian educators Pamela Wallberg and Maria Kahn introduced rights education to an early childhood program group of 3 and 4 year-old children in British Columbia over a three-month period. The introduction of "The Rights Project" was motivated in large part by observations of the children’s self-focus and disregard for the feelings of their peers. Using a coloring book designed to teach very young children about their rights, the teachers hoped to shift the children’s focus from individual wants to community needs – to increase levels of cooperation, altruism, and empathy.

== Evaluations of children’s human rights education ==
The earliest reported evaluation of a child rights education project was that of the initiative in Bruges. Involving children ages 3 to 12, the primary focus of the evaluation was on the students’ social behavior. Gains in social understanding, respectful behaviors, concern for others, and pro-social action were the key observed changes. For example, the children became more interested in social justice and rights-related issues such as peace, war, injustice, and hunger. And they wanted to discuss the rights of marginalized children – those living with disabilities, in institutions, and of ethnic minority status.

Similar outcomes were found in evaluations of the effects of children’s rights education in Cape Breton schools. Evaluations conducted on students in grades 6 and 8 (ages 12 and 14 years) showed improved classroom climate, engagement, and behavior. At the grade 6 level differences were found in children’s understanding of rights, their acceptance of minority children, and their perceived levels of peer and teacher support. Teachers reported improved behavior and more positive classroom climate. In addition at the grade 8 level, children in rights-based classes showed increases in their self-esteem. Similar child-initiated projects to those reported from Bruges were seen also. For example, at one school upon realizing that not every child in the area was assured their right to nutritious food, the students initiated a breakfast program by obtaining cooperation and donations from the local community. In a different school, the class decided to work at a local food bank to help children whose families were unable to provide sufficient nutritious food.

Anecdotal data from the teachers who used the grade 12 curriculum described how engaged their students were in the activities, and noted improvements in their students’ appreciation of global problems, and of the complexity and importance of respecting human rights. Students who had participated in the project completed a survey. The results showed them to be three times more likely than their peers to understand humanitarian assistance for children in difficult circumstances as a fundamental human right.

The most comprehensive evaluation data are of the Hampshire RRR initiative. Annual assessments over six years were conducted to assess the effects of the RRR. Included were children ages 4 – 14. Children and teachers in schools where RRR had been fully implemented were compared with those in demographically equivalent schools without RRR. These comparisons showed the following effects of RRR. Across ages, children showed a greater understanding of rights and their relation to responsibilities, increased levels of self-regulation, confidence, effort and motivation, participation and engagement in school, and achievement. These cognitive and attitudinal changes were reflected in significant improvements in behaviors. Children were reported by both their classroom teachers and the school principal to be more respectful, cooperative, inclusive and sensitive to the needs of other children. Incidents of bullying were reduced dramatically with disagreements being resolved using the discourse of rights rather than through physical or verbal aggression.

Teaching in RRR schools also led to changes in the teachers. School administrators noted significant changes in teachers use of democratic teaching and positive classroom management, and in less confrontational dealings with their students. Teachers were listening to children and taking their views into account. And the greater the level of student engagement and participation, the more teachers showed gains in a sense of personal achievement and significant decreases in emotional exhaustion and depersonalization.

Among all the positive findings of the evaluation of the RRR, the most intriguing was that at each time of measure the most disadvantaged school showed the greatest positive changes. Improvements in engagement, behavior and academic achievement were remarkable, and have been attributed to how the RRR transformed the culture of the school. The evidence suggests that schools that are fully consistent with the provisions of the Convention on the Rights of the Child can mediate the effects of a challenging environment of rearing and help close the achievement gap between disadvantaged children and their more advantaged peers.

== Other evaluations ==
Although no formal evaluation has yet been published on the New Zealand initiative, anecdotal evidence suggests the outcomes are comparable to those reported from Hampshire. Teachers report improved learning environments and decreased stress. "Makes me think critically about some of the things I do in my classroom", a teacher reported, "especially some of the aspects of my behavior management." Another stressed that she has "had fabulous response from the children."

Evaluation data from Pamela Wallberg and Maria Kahn show that their preschool rights project was highly successful. They found that teaching young children about their Convention rights in an age-appropriate way transformed the learning environment. As classroom rules were replaced with rights, less adult control was needed and group conversations changed from chaotic chatter to the respectful exchange of ideas. The children’s behavior toward each other changed markedly. Their interactions reflected an understanding of the universality of rights and the importance of protecting the rights of others. And even at this very young age, rights discourse replaced arguing; for example, "you are hurting my right to play" became an effective problem solver that replaced tears and fighting. Wallberg and Kahn conclude that the children’s recognition of the relationship between rights and responsibilities shifted their focus "from 'me' to 'we'."

== See also ==
- Children's rights
- Children’s rights movement
- Convention on the Rights of the Child
- Human rights education
- Right to education
