= Rowen House School =

Location
- Formerly at 50 Holbrook Road; Belper, Derbyshire, DE56 1PB; England; 53.0154°N 1.4782°W

Information
- Type: Democratic education
- Established: 1979
- Founders: Bryn and Meg Purdy
- Closed: 4 February 1992
- Local authority: Derbyshire
- Gender: Girls

Rowen House was an independent British boarding school founded in 1979 in Belper, Derbyshire. The name was not a misspelling, but a reference to the Utopian thinker and eutopian practitioner, Robert Owen. This "educational experiment" used the power of the childhood group like Summerhill School.

== Principles ==
It was based on the principles developed by A. S. Neill at Summerhill School, in turn deriving from those pioneered by Homer Lane in his Little Commonwealth. The children which it served were however substantially different. Summerhill children were those of fee-paying parents, who patronised it for ideological reasons. Rowen House was funded by state education authorities looking for respite care for behaviourally disordered girls from usually socially deprived backgrounds. A particularly apt phrase has been coined for them – "school phobic". Moreover, they were largely entering their teenage years.

Nevertheless, the basic Summerhill principles applied. That even children who resist being taught have an appetite to learn. Moreover, will learn self-control in an environment free of imposed control, where it is negotiated within a mutually supportive social community. In other words, democracy instead of authoritarianism.

== Background ==
Its head, Bryn Purdy, had worked at Summerhill and had also been invited to join Wills in his Bromley project. After this, he applied its principles in an inner city "special" school set up by the Local Education Authority for day pupils.

As Shotton was later to write What unites the Little Commonwealth . . . and Rowen House . . . is the importance attached to personal autonomy, the aversion to systems of reward and punishment, hostility to coercive pedagogy and the fundamental and central belief in [shared responsibility].

However, in the 1970s, control of state education became more centralised, with more emphasis on what could be termed behaviourist principles. Accordingly, it became increasingly difficult to maintain the semi-formal approach to engaging the children in learning and self-discipline.

== The school ==
Accordingly, Bryn Purdy and his wife bought a former orphanage in Belper to develop as an independent school to which various local authorities might refer children, specifically adolescent girls, who were finding it impossible to progress in more conventional educational settings.

Such children may have been subjected to a family background of neglect or violence, and to sustained bullying at school, to which they have reacted in the only way they knew how. As Purdy puts it "a teacher, through his or her headteacher, will bring the child to the attention of an educational psychologist, who may engage the help of a social worker. Then, after five years or so, when the child is at the end – no, when the child has cut his tether – the psychiatrist will call a Case Conference… the odd headteacher or social worker, or educational psychologist, who cares for the individual child, will press for his or her welfare, and, eventually, the child will arrive at our school."

Purdy uses the term "unschool"... "When a child has suffered failure, for whatever reason, at school or at home, we feel that we must offer her something different, perhaps radically different, from the arena of failure in the past… We aim to enter into as egalitarian a relationship with her as possible. One of the means of achieving this is to hold an assembly each day which we call the 'Moot'."

The "Moot" was the morning meeting central to the school day, where each individual felt free to raise any issues that concerned it. Unlike other previous schools, such as the "Little Commonwealth", fining was not imposed for misdemeanours, since the children had virtually no money. Instead restitution was sought and agreed with the other children.

Initially characterised by outbursts of shouting and emotionality, frequently bordering on violence, as Purdy puts it Each day, week, month, brought less shouting, less wrangling; more rationality, more humour. The character of the Moot changed from a judicial 'court' to an exercise of conviviality, a daily conversation between friends.

Although classes were voluntary, most children attended at least some of them most of the time and since each child was there voluntarily the lessons tended to be productive. Among the many parents, teachers, educationalists was an MP who felt moved to express praise in Parliament.

A number went on to attend a local college part-time to progress to 'A' level and, after leaving, some have gained degrees at university. Children who would have been otherwise deserted by the educational system have gone on to successful lives.

With the Education Reform Act 1988 however, introduction of the National Curriculum became compulsory. The Inspectorate of Schools insisted that the Moot be removed from the timetable and that attendance at class be compulsory. This was exactly the environment that the children had come from, and with which they had been unable to cope. While schools like Summerhill were sufficiently well known and well connected to continue (and won a ground-breaking tribunal appeal) it became impossible for Rowen House to continue.
