= Penguin Education =

Book publisher imprint

Penguin Education was an imprint of the British publisher Penguin Books, running from 1965 to 1974.

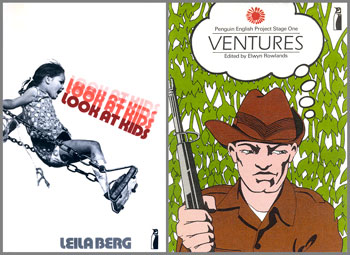
Covers of two Penguin Education titles

== Early days ==
Before the imprint formally came into being, Jill Norman had been hired to do research into higher education and determine trends, so that Allen Lane could decide if this was a market he wanted to get into. She worked at the National Book League, nominally for Allen Lane's friend Jack Morpurgo, the director. Allen Lane chose to keep her year's work on the project from the members of the board until she was able to present them with her report. Penguin Education emerged from this experiment in 1965 and was initially headed by Christopher Dolley as managing director. He was succeeded in 1966 by Charles Clark, who combined the role from 1967 with running Penguin Books' hardback imprint Allen Lane the Penguin Press. The new imprint began by publishing, with Longman, the revolutionary Nuffield Foundation Science Teaching Project, a driver of change in science teaching. Among the other initial projects were the five-volume series A History of Britain, the Learning Mathematics Project, and the Success with English course.

== Higher Education titles ==
The many series subsequently produced for students in higher education covered a wide range of subject areas, and included the history of science, law and society, the Library of Technology and the Science of Behaviour. Notable and influential best-sellers for this market were Peter Worsley's Introducing Sociology, which became an Open University set book, and James Britton's Language and Learning. For students of literature there were critical anthologies on the work of major writers such as Charles Dickens, Henry Fielding, Henrik Ibsen, Ben Jonson, DH Lawrence, Jonathan Swift and W. B. Yeats; and in the scholarly Penguin English Poets series volumes covering Sir Gawain and the Green Knight, William Wordsworth's The Prelude, Lord Byron's Don Juan, Robert Browning's The Ring and the Book, and the complete poems of John Donne, Samuel Johnson, Christopher Marlowe and Andrew Marvell. The books were marketed by a team based mainly in Harmondsworth, headed by John Hitchin, and given a stylish make-over by the eminent designer Derek Birdsall.

== Education specials ==
Meanwhile, the imprint's Penguin Education Specials were making a considerable stir. The Hornsey Affair, written by the staff and students of Hornsey College of Art, offered a radical critique of art education, the students’ protest and sit-in there having provoked similar action in other art schools. Warwick University Ltd centred on the student occupation within the university and their uncovering of secret surveillance of staff and students. Edited by E P Thompson and produced at speed in six weeks, the book highlighted issues such as the close links between industry and the universities, and academic and press freedom Other Education Specials focussed on radical ideas from abroad, with books on schooling by American writers and teachers such as John Holt, Paul Goodman, Hebert Kohl, George Dennison and Everett Reimer. Notably influential were the ideas of the Austrian philosopher Ivan Illich in Deschooling Society and the Brazilian Paulo Freire's Pedagogy of the Oppressed. The series also included titles about schooling in Britain, such as The Pre-School Years, Juniors, Education for a Change, Learner Teacher, Young Teachers and Reluctant Learners and The Multi-Racial School. There were books about radical experiments such as R.F. Mackenzie's State School, Leila Berg's Look at Kids, David Wills’ Spare the Child, David Head's Free Way to Learning and Neill and Summerhill: A Man and His Work: A Pictorial Study by John Walmsley; and others on controversial topics such as Peter Newell's A Last Resort? Corporal Punishment in Schools.

== The schoolbook list ==
In 1967 Martin Lightfoot had been appointed editor of the schoolbook list. The books he commissioned reflected the contemporary move away from didactic instruction towards a shared exploration of ideas between children and teachers. He published Geoffrey Summerfield's Voices and then Junior Voices, beautifully designed poetry anthologies which drew material from a rich and original variety of sources. Making use of the new and affordable integrated litho printing technique, they combined words and images in a visually arresting style. The books were child-centred, and aimed to speak directly to pupils, without any intrusive exercises or other teacher apparatus. Their success led the way for the cutting-edge Penguin English Project, a series of anthologies for the different stages of secondary schools. Its wide range of topics included Identity, Other Worlds, Alone, Cities, and Danger. Mixing high-quality photographs, short stories, poems, play extracts, pictures, drawings, science fiction and cartoons, they providing original material for student exploration and argument. Then came the anthology Story, three volumes of stories and pictures, and Worlds: Seven Modern Poets, comprising photographs of Charles Causley, Thom Gunn, Seamus Heaney, Ted Hughes, Norman MacCaig, Adrian Mitchell and Edwin Morgan, and their objects and environments. Another notable success was Connexions, a series of provocative magazine-style topic books aimed at non-academic teenagers in schools and colleges of further education. Covering topics such as drugs, popular culture, football, relationships, work, food, marriage, shelter, advertising, the law, prejudice, violence and much else, they aimed to stimulate discussion by presenting opposing arguments within these topics, and to connect school education with real life. They were launched by the former Conservative education minister Edward Boyle, a key advisor to Penguin Education. Other published series included Extensions, the Penguin Primary Project, Take Part Books, Listening and Reading, Topics in History, Human Space, and Biology Topic Books (Human Populations by David Hay in the latter series won the 1973 Times Educational Supplement Information Book Award). The production of these books involved an unusually extensive collaboration between writers, editors, designers, illustrators and picture researchers working as an integrated team, an arrangement then rare in schoolbook publishing.

== The division closes ==
In March 1974 Penguin's owners Pearson Longman decided to close the division, leaving 42 members of staff redundant Although the division had been making a profit since 1970, the school books were discontinued, and the higher education titles and Education Specials transferred to the general operation. The move came at a point of major retrenchment by the company, resulting in significant job cuts across the board, and stringent cutbacks in the number of new titles to be published. Within education there was widespread surprise and alarm at the decision to close down Penguin Education. More than 80 teachers, journalists and leading academics signed a letter to the Times Educational Supplement regretting the death of the imprint. A lead article in the TES on the same day noted: ‘Penguin Education made an impact because of a freshness of approach and design. They also gave intelligent expression to progressive ideas, and developed a personality for their imprint which contrasted usefully with those of their more staid seniors.’

== The aftermath ==
Although attempts to find a buyer for the imprint failed, two publishing cooperatives set up by a few of the redundant employees – Chameleon (editorial) and Ikon (design and picture research) – found homes for certain series. The Penguin English Project dropped the Penguin label and was completed by Ward Lock Educational; Connexions was renamed Standpoints and was continued by Oxford University Press; and further books on education were published by Writers and Readers Publishing Cooperative.
