= Herbert George Jenkins =

British writer (1876–1923)

Herbert George Jenkins (1876 – 8 June 1923) was a British writer and the owner of the publishing company Herbert Jenkins Ltd, which published many of P. G. Wodehouse's novels.

== Biography ==
Jenkins' parents came from Norfolk and, according to his obituary in The Times, he was educated at Greyfriars College. He began work as a journalist and then spent some 11 years at The Bodley Head before founding his own publishing house in 1912. He remained unmarried and died at the age of 47, on 8 June 1923 after a six-month-long illness, in Marylebone, London.

== As publisher ==
Dust jacket of Piccadilly Jim, Wodehouse's first novel to be published by Herbert Jenkins

In 1912 Jenkins founded his own publishing company: Herbert Jenkins Limited. Its offices were in a narrow, 19th-century building with five floors in Duke of York Street, just off Jermyn Street in London. It was a successful business from the start because of Jenkins' unique ability (at the time) to cater for the ever-changing public taste. He also had a good eye for new talent, not being discouraged if a manuscript had been rejected by other publishers. His publicity methods were innovative, too; with arresting advertisements and dust jackets, and a monthly publication called Wireless, which was widely circulated among his readers. Jenkins' first publication was Willie Riley's first novel Windyridge, and the firm went on to publish most of Riley's 39 books, ending with The Man and the Mountain in 1961, the year of Riley's death. In 1915 Jenkins published A. S. Neill's first book, A Dominie's Log, launching his career as a famous teacher and writer of books on education. Herbert Jenkins Ltd published many of P. G. Wodehouse's novels, starting with Piccadilly Jim in 1918.

By the 1950s – long after Jenkins' death – the company was still being run as a 1930s business might have been. In 1964 it merged with Barrie & Rockcliffe to form Barrie & Jenkins, which continued to publish Wodehouse's novels, but specialised in books about ceramics, pottery and antiques. In 1969 the company published the first of George MacDonald Fraser's popular The Flashman Papers novels after it had been rejected by many other publishers. Barrie & Jenkins had a short commercial history and was taken over by Hutchinson, who were themselves taken over by Century and then by Random House (now owned by Bertelsmann). It continues to exist as a specialist imprint mainly for hardback editions within the Random House stable.

=== Book series ===
The following series were published by Herbert Jenkins Ltd:

- Fireside Library
- Green Label Novels
- Herbert Jenkins' Colonial Library
- Herbert Jenkins SF (Science Fiction)
- How to Catch Them
- The Shilling Library
- "Reason Why" Series
- Splendid Library
- To-Day Library

== As a writer ==
Although Jenkins is best known for his light fiction, his first book was a biography of George Borrow. He was an admirer of the poet and visual artist William Blake and conducted research into his trial for high treason and the location of his lost grave, writing a book on him, posthumously published in 1925.

His most popular fictional creation was Mr. Joseph Bindle, who first appeared in a humorous novel in 1916 and in a number of sequels. In the preface to the books, T. P. O'Connor said that "Bindle is the greatest Cockney that has come into being through the medium of literature since Dickens wrote Pickwick Papers". The stories are based on the comedic drama of life at work, at home and all the adventures that take place along the way.

Jenkins also wrote a number of short stories about Detective Malcolm Sage, which were collected into one book in 1921. Sage has been compared to both Hercule Poirot and Sherlock Holmes in his style of detective work. Three of the Sage stories were included in Eugene Thwing's 10-volume collection of vintage detective stories, The World's Best 100 Detective Stories (1929).

As was the norm at the time, many of his fictional works appeared first in pulp magazines. Two of his novels and several of his short stories were made into short movies.

=== List of works ===
According to a bibliography compiled by the English Department at the Canadian Mount Royal College, Jenkins wrote the following works:

- 1912 The Life Of George Borrow
- 1916 Bindle: Some Chapters in the Life of Joseph Bindle
  a.k.a. Bindle: The Story Of A Cheerful Soul
- 1917 The Night Club
- 1918 Patricia Brent, Spinster
- 1919 The Adventures of Bindle
- 1919 The Rain-Girl: A Romance Of Today
- 1920 John Dene Of Toronto – A Comedy Of Whitehall
- 1921 Malcolm Sage, Detective.
- 1922 The Return of Alfred
- 1924 Mrs. Bindle: Some Incidents from the Domestic Life of the Bindles
- 1924 Bindles on the Rocks
- 1925 William Blake: Studies of his Life and Personality
- 1928 The Stiffsons and other Stories
- 1932 Bindles omnibus

== Film adaptations ==
Jenkins' Bindle books were the inspiration for the 1926 series of two-reeler shorts Bindle Introduced, Bindle at the Party, Bindle in Charge, Bindle's Cocktail, Bindle, Millionaire, and Bindle, Matchmaker; and later The Temperance Fête (1931) and Bindle (One of Them Days) (1966).
