= SEED Alternative School =

Coordinates: 43.66213°N 79.35032°W

- Toronto, Ontario, M4M 1R4; Canada

Information
- School type: High School
- Founded: 1968
- School board: Toronto District School Board
- Superintendent: Peter Chang
- Area trustee: Sara Ehrhardt
- Principal: Mohammed Askary
- Grades: 11 - 12
- Language: English

SEED Alternative School is an alternative high school, part of the Toronto District School Board. The name is an acronym of "Shared Experience Exploration Discovery"

== History ==
SEED was founded in 1968, making it the oldest public alternative secondary school in North America.

Science fiction author Judith Merril ran a weekly science fiction seminar at SEED from 1972–1973.

Students are called SEEDlings. Many are artists and activists like tech author and journalist Cory Doctorow who got his high school degree from SEED according to his Wikipedia page.

== Philosophy ==
The school was founded in accordance to the ideas of Jean Piaget and the book Summerhill by A.S. Neill. Focusing on democratic decision making, critical thinking and collective action. Instead of a top-down model of education, where teachers decide what the student has to learn, students would negotiate "Individual learning contracts".

== See also ==
- Education in Ontario
- List of secondary schools in Ontario
