= The Agitator =

1945 British film by John Harlow

- Directed by: John Harlow
- Written by: Edward Dryhurst
- Based on: Peter Pettinger by William Riley
- Produced by: Louis H. Jackson
- Starring: William Hartnell; Mary Morris; John Laurie
- Cinematography: James Wilson
- Edited by: Douglas Myers
- Music by: John Greenwood
- Production company: British National Films
- Distributed by: Anglo-American Film Corporation
- Release date: 3 September 1945
- Running time: 104 minutes
- Country: United Kingdom
- Language: English

The Agitator is a 1945 British drama film directed by John Harlow and starring William Hartnell, Mary Morris and John Laurie. It was written by Edward Dryhurst and based on the 1925 novel Peter Pettinger by William Riley.

== Plot ==
A young mechanic unexpectedly inherits the large firm where he works and tries to run it according to his socialist political beliefs.

== Cast ==
- William Hartnell (credited as Billy Hartnell) as Peter Pettinger
- Mary Morris as Lettie Shackleton
- John Laurie as Tom Tetley
- Moore Marriott as Ben Duckett
- J.H. Roberts as Mr. Ambler
- George Carney as Bill Shackleton
- Frederick Leister as Mark Overend
- Joss Ambler as Charles Sheridan
- Elliott Mason as Mrs. Pettinger
- Cathleen Nesbitt as Mrs. Montrose
- Joyce Heron as Helen Montrose
- Edward Rigby as Charlie Branfield
- Philip Godfrey as Bert Roberts
- Moira Lister as Joan Shackleton
- Beatrice Varley as Mrs. Shackleton
- Cyril Smith as Dunham
- Howard Douglas as Taylor
- Lloyd Pearson as Derek Cunlyffe
- Edgar Driver as Smith
- Bransby Williams as Salvation Army leader

== Critical reception ==
The Monthly Film Bulletin wrote: "Here is a strong story which grips its audience up to the moment when it starts to make rather obvious fun of Pettinger in his exalted position – and sometimes even after that. Billy Hartnell makes the most of the character of Peter Pettinger, and on the whole he is well supported by the rest of the cast, which includes such well-known names as John Laurie, Moore Marriott, Joss Ambler, Cathleen Nesbitt and Bransby Williams. Wilfred Arnolds' art direction is good, and John Harlow has kept his direction in key. The film is certainly thought-provoking and a good example of the less lavish type of British production."

Kine Weekly wrote: "Types are extremely well drawn – Billy Hartnell reveals unsuspected talent and range in tihe lead – and the detail is neat, but much character and colour are lost by its refusal to take sides. Nevertheless, it has its moments and obvious mass appeal. ... Mary Morris is adequate in the only worthwhile feminine role, and John Laurie, Moore Marriott, Frederick Leister and J. H. Roberts are the best of the shrewdly chosen rest. The story, clearly showing how power and riches embarrass the gas-bag, opens well, but subsequently both script writer and director are over-cautious and their restraint, born apparently of a conscientious desire to be fair to both sides, finally results in a somewhat protracted and bloodless contest, seldom provocative or controversial. Most of us prefer our entertainment and propaganda to have more punch. But to be fair, it is no waste of time witnessing Billy Hartnell's accurate and sustained portrayal."

Variety wrote: "Major weakress is its failure to stick to one basic problem. Capital and labor are equally defended during the early stages of the film. ... Film fails to take advantage of the habits and customs of the small village. Entire play is put in the hands of the leading character, Peter Pettinger, whose brashness is properly portrayed by William Hartnell. Mary Morris shows intelligence and understanding as Hartnell's girl friend, while Elliot Mason adds a realistic touch as his mother. John Laurie turns in a good job as a shop foreman. John Harlow's direction does nothing to alleviate the film's excessive length of 95 minutes."

Leslie Halliwell said: "Fairly absorbing, modest narrative of the flaws of socialism."

In British Sound Films: The Studio Years 1928–1959 David Quinlan rated the film as "average", writing: "Thought-provoking drama becomes too light in later stages."

== Production ==
It was made by British National Films at the company's Elstree Studios, with sets designed by the art director Wilfred Arnold.
