= Bindle (One of Them Days) =

1966 British film by Peter Saunders

- Opening titles
- Directed by: Peter Saunders
- Screenplay by: Glyn Jones
- Produced by: Arthur S. Ferriman
- Starring: Alfie Bass
- Cinematography: Gerald Gibbs
- Edited by: Peter Weatherley
- Production company: Tannsfeld Productions
- Release date: 1966
- Running time: 60 minutes
- Country: United Kingdom
- Language: English

Bindle (One of Them Days), also known as Bindle and One of Them Days, is a 1966 British comedy film directed by Peter Saunders and starring Alfie Bass. It was written by Glyn Jones based on the Bindle books by Herbert Jenkins. The film concerns the adventures of an accident-prone furniture remover and his mate.

The Bindle books had been previously brought to the screen in the 1926 series of two-reeler shorts Bindle Introduced, Bindle at the Party, Bindle in Charge, Bindle's Cocktail, Bindle, Millionaire, and Bindle, Matchmaker; and later in The Temperance Fête (1931).

== Plot ==
Joseph Bindle is an ageing furniture remover and antique seller. In a dream he relives a day in the 1920s when he and his workmate Ginger are hired to move the furniture of Mr. Fawcett. One thing after another goes wrong.

== Cast ==
- Alfie Bass as Joseph Bindle
- Johnny Wade as Ginger
- Carmel McSharry as Mrs. Bindle
- Janina Faye as Millie
- Patrick Newell as Mr. Hearty
- Brenda Cowling as Martha Hearty
- John Tate as Mr. Stokes
- Ivor Dean as Mr. Fawcett
- Kenneth Benda as Rev. Sopley
- Hugh Janes as William
- Hugh McDermott as American tourist
- Doris Nolan as American tourist
- George Tovey as stallholder
- Pat Gilbert as barmaid
- Bill Shine as man in country pub
- Jeffrey Chandler as little boy

== Production ==
The film was to have been the first of a series of films for TV, but there were no further films; in February 1966 Kine Weekly reported: "Arthur Ferriman, head of Tannsfield Films Ltd., and Tom Donald, joint managing director of Global Television, announce that it has been mutually agreed that the Bindle series of hour-long films will not be handled by Global Television as previously announced."

== Critical reception ==
In a contemporary review John Gillett wrote in Monthly Film Bulletin: "Apparently the first film in a projected series based on the popular characters created in the Twenties by Herbert Jenkins, Bindle (One of Them Days) has a surprising amount of charm (albeit of a slightly old-fashioned kind), deriving mainly from the lively, stylised dialogue-presumably taken from Jenkins' original and from the sharply observed playing of Alfie Bass as the much put-upon but resilient hero. Although allowing a few of the minor characters some excessive, TV-style mugging, Peter Saunders generally maintains a quietly humorous tone and a gently relaxed pace, and makes no attempt at any spurious set-pieces. The period decoration is unusually apt ... and there is a rich, though never overdrawn portrait of Mrs. Bindle, sharp-tongued and perpetually wailing, by Carmel McSharry. ... Certainly more varied and believable than Steptoe and Son (to which they are distantly related), the Bindle stories might still make a popular, if modest, series."
