= Ena May Neill =

British head teacher

- Born: Ena May Wooff; 29 May 1910; West Malling
- Died: 26 October 1997 (aged 87); Aldeburgh
- Occupations: Educationist, headteacher
- Employer: Summerhill School
- Predecessor: A. S. Neill
- Successor: Zoe Readhead
- Spouses: Bill Wood; A S Neill
- Children: Peter Wood; Zoe Readhead

Ena May Neill (née Ena May Wooff, formerly Ena May Wood; 29 May 1910 – 26 October 1997) was a British head teacher at Summerhill School. She managed the school for years on behalf of the founder, A. S. Neill, before she became the head officially in 1973.

== Background ==
Neill was born in 1910 in West Malling. Her parents were Ethel Sophie May and Ernest George Wooff. Her father worked for a grocer. She began training as a nurse but abandoned that career to marry a commercial artist, Bill (William Albert) Wood. The marriage did not last and their son, Peter, was sent to board at Summerhill School.

This allowed Ena May Wooff to work and she was employed at a photographic studio. When the studio was destroyed by a Second World War bombing raid, she decided to emigrate. After telling the head of her son's school, A. S. Neill, of her plan to move to America with Peter, he offered Wooff a position as school cook, which she accepted; over time that role greatly expanded into other areas of the school's running.

== Summerhill ==
Summerhill School, a progressive school founded in 1921, was evacuated to Ffestiniog in Wales during the war. At this time, the head's first wife, "Mrs Lin", became seriously ill and required nursing care, which Wooff provided until Mrs Lin died in 1944. She also became a housemother during the school's time in Wales. Wooff became increasingly involved in the running of the school, just as Mrs Lin had been before her illness.

After his first wife's death, Wooff married the school's founder, A. S. Neill on 14 April 1945. He was synonymous with Summerhill, the school famous since the 1920s for its unconventional approach, as being, for example, a "free" school where pupils could optionally attend classes. The philosophy and practices of the school were controversial and it relied on the support of leading intellectuals including the philosopher Bertrand Russell.

One of the Neills' first tasks after their marriage in 1945, since the war had ended, was to move the school back from Wales to its former site in Leiston, where it had been since 1927. The school had been used as an army training camp, and its buildings were not left in a fit state to function as a school. They needed extensive restoration and refurbishment. Student enrolments at the school fluctuated over the decades and were in steep decline in the 1950s. By 1960 there were just 25 pupils at the school. At this point, Ena May Neill's husband had his book on the ethos and practices of the school, Summerhill, published; it was highly successful, selling two million copies, re-popularising his approach and raising the school's profile.

Ena Neill had overseen many aspects of running the school, gathering the necessary managerial skills as she went; in 1970, her husband handed over to her its full administration. When her husband died in 1973 she became the head of the school officially and ran it until 1985. She was succeeded by her daughter Zoe Readhead, her and A. S. Neill's only child together. She had been born to the couple in 1946 and had attended the school as a student. Readhead explained that although her father had the reputation of being a benign leader, it was her mother who established a level of order in the school.

Neill died in Aldeburgh in 1997.
