= Hawksworth, Guiseley =

Coordinates: 53.873°N 1.751°W

Hawksworth
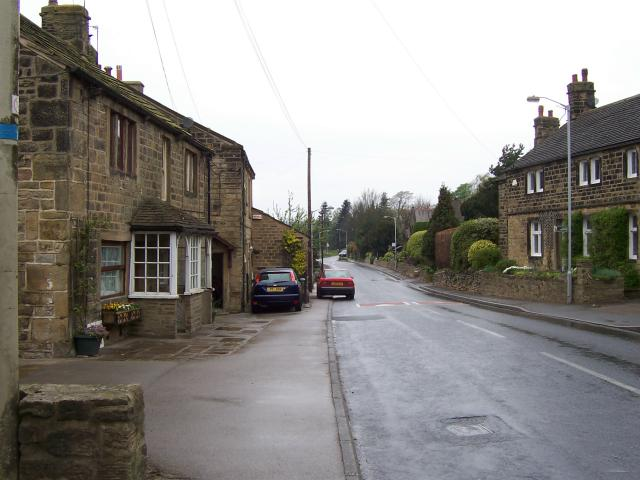
- Old Lane, Hawksworth

- Location within West Yorkshire
- OS grid reference: SE163418
- Metropolitan borough: City of Leeds
- Metropolitan county: West Yorkshire
- Region: Yorkshire and the Humber
- Country: England
- Sovereign state: United Kingdom
- Post town: LEEDS
- Postcode district: LS20
- Dialling code: 01943
- Police: West Yorkshire
- Fire: West Yorkshire
- Ambulance: Yorkshire
- UK Parliament: Leeds North West

Hawksworth is a village 1 mile (1.6 km) west of the town of Guiseley, in the Leeds district, in West Yorkshire, England. It is located to the south of Menston and north of Baildon.

== Etymology ==
The name of Hawksworth is first attested in a charter of 1030 in the phrase on Hafeces-weorðe, and then in the Domesday Book of 1086 in the form Hauochesuurde and variants thereof. The Old English word hafoces meant 'hawk's', but the word is thought in this place-name to have been a personal name; worð, meanwhile, means 'enclosure'. Thus the name once meant 'enclosure belonging to Hafoc'.

== History ==
Hawksworth Hall, a Grade II* listed building, is a large house, probably built in the 16th century. Hawksworth Church of England Primary School has around 100 pupils.

Hawksworth is the model for the fictional village of "Windyridge" in the 1912 novel of that name by Willie Riley. The central character, London artist and photographer Grace Holden, finds the village by chance and decides to rent a cottage there for a year. Until the 1940s the village was often visited by readers looking for "Windyridge".

== Governance ==
Hawksworth was historically a township in the ancient parish of Otley in the West Riding of Yorkshire. It became a separate civil parish in 1866. In 1937 the civil parish was abolished and merged into the Aireborough Urban District. In 1974 Aireborough was abolished and absorbed into Leeds metropolitan district in West Yorkshire. It is in the Guiseley and Rawdon Ward of Leeds City Council. In 1931 the parish had a population of 769.

== See also ==
- Listed buildings in Guiseley and Rawdon
