= Windyridge =

1912 novel by Willie Riley

- Cover of the 2010 re-issue
- Author: Willie Riley
- Genre: Novel
- Set in: West Riding of Yorkshire
- Published: London
- Publisher: Herbert Jenkins
- Publication date: 1912
- ISBN: 978-1906600181 (2010 re-issue)
- Text: Windyridge at Project Gutenberg

Windyridge is a 1912 novel by English writer Willie Riley, the first of his 39 published books. It sold half a million copies, stayed in print until 1961, and was republished in 2010 with an extended introduction by David Copeland (ISBN 978-1-906600-18-1).

The book was originally written as an entertainment for Riley's wife and two recently bereaved friends, the Bolton sisters, to be read to them in weekly episodes during 1911 and 1912.

The story concerns young artist and photographer, Grace Holden, who moves from London to spend a year in the small Yorkshire village of Windyridge.

In 1928 Riley wrote a sequel, Windyridge Revisited, which remained in print until 1949.

Riley's obituaries on his death in 1961 described him as "the famous Bradford-born author of Windyridge and 34 other novels" and "the author who established himself with his first novel, Windyridge".

After moving to Silverdale in 1919, Riley renamed his house there "Windyridge", a name it retained until sold in 2015 (now known as 8 Wallings Lane). The name became fashionable as a house name and was widely used.

Shortly before his death Riley donated his manuscript of Windyridge to Leeds Central Library.

== Locations ==
The locations in the novel can all be identified with real places in Yorkshire, near Riley's home town of Bradford. The village of "Windyridge" is based on Hawksworth near Baildon ("Marsland"), and the nearest town, "Fawkshill", where Grace attends church, is Guiseley. Grace and her neighbour make an expedition over the moor from "Uncle Ned's" pub (now Dick Hudson's at Eldwick) to "Romanton" (Ilkley). The cities of Leeds and Bradford appear as "Airlee" and "Broadbeck" respectively.
