= Connie Ediss =

English actress and singer (1870–1934)

Ediss as Mrs Girdle in The Spring Chicken, 1905

Connie Ediss (born Ada Harriet Whitley; 11 August 1870 – 18 April 1934) was an English actress and singer best known as a buxom, good-humoured comedian in many of the popular Edwardian musical comedies around the turn of the 20th century.

After beginning her career in provincial theatres in Britain in music hall and pantomime in the 1880s, Ediss was engaged to play in a series of extraordinarily successful musical comedies at the Gaiety Theatre, London, beginning in 1896, and also played in several musicals on Broadway. During World War I, she began a long tour in Australia, returning to London in 1919 to play in farces and comedies. She made a few films in the 1930s.

== Early life and career ==
Born in Brighton in 1870 as Ada Harriet Whitley, Ediss was the youngest of four daughters of milliner Jane Whitley née McClean (born 1844) and John Whitley (1837–1909), a Brighton tailor. Shortly after Ediss's birth Jane Whitley left her husband to live with Charles Coates (1850–1910), a house painter, and took her youngest daughter with her. Ediss then assumed the name Ada Harriet Coates; her parents never divorced, and so her mother never married Coates. It is possible that Charles Coates was her biological father; in the 1881 Census she is listed as the daughter of Coates, but in that for 1891 she is shown as his stepdaughter. She was later to claim that her mother and her aunt had both been members of the D'Oyly Carte Opera Company, but as Richard D'Oyly Carte did not produce opera until well after Ediss and her sisters were born, that claim is doubtful. She began her career in provincial theatres at the age of 12, originally using the stage name "Connie Coutts". She made her first appearance on a London stage in 1893 singing and dancing in variety shows at Albert Chevalier's Trocadero music hall. She also played in pantomime as a principal boy.

Ediss (left) with Edmund Payne, George Grossmith, Jr. and Gertie Millar in The Orchid, 1903

In 1895 she married Asher Marks (1867–1936). She received a lucky break in 1895 when she was asked to fill in for an ailing Nellie Farren at the Gaiety Theatre, London. George Edwardes signed Ediss to a three-year contract. The Times later commented, "Edwardes had an uncanny flair for personalities, and in his new recruit he found a personality indeed, an actress with a 'Gaiety sense', a comedian of a rare type, and a wholesome 'comfortable-looking' – his own words – foil to the orchidaceous showgirls of the Gaiety." Edwardes sent her to New York, where she appeared in the Broadway production of The Shop Girl as Ada Smith. The next year, she returned to England to appear in Edwardian musical comedies at the Gaiety Theatre, beginning with My Girl and The Circus Girl, as Mme. Drivelli.

In her roles at the Gaiety, she won critical praise for her "brightness, vivacity, and humour". She became known as for her comic "buxom bourgeoise" characters. These roles were "invariably the same, whatever the play ... the plump, attractive little lady with the infectious chuckle and the keen Cockney sanity". She next appeared in A Runaway Girl (1898) as Carmenita, The Messenger Boy (1900) as Mrs. Bang, The Silver Slipper, The Toreador (1901) as Amelia, The Orchid (1903) as Caroline Twining, The Spring Chicken (1905) as Mrs. Girdle and The New Aladdin (1906) as Spirit of the Ring. In these shows, she popularised such songs as "Rosie", "I Ride to Win" and "What Could a Poor Girl Do?" In between two of these engagements, she performed comic sketches in a very successful music hall act with Henry Lytton.

Ediss then was sent to America to appear as Mrs. Henry Schniff in the 1907 Broadway production The Girl Behind the Counter. The New York Times commented on her "use of a grotesque costume, a good Cockney accent, and a prodigious sense of humor". Later in 1907, she travelled to South Africa for a long music hall tour. She was back on Broadway for the American production of The Arcadians (1910) as Mrs. Smith. She then returned to England to play a role that was added for her to The Girl in the Train (1910), in which she sang "When I was in the Chorus at the Gaiety". Similarly, for Peggy (1911), when the popularity of the show began to wane, Edwardes had a new role written for Ediss. In The Sunshine Girl (1912), as Brenda Blacker, the Daily Mail said that Ediss "revels in the reckless drollery of" the role. Ediss next played in The Girl on the Film (1913) in the London production, and then in the Broadway production, as Euphemia Knox.

== Later years ==
In 1914, Ediss starred in the London revue Not Likely. Her next role was on Broadway in the musical Suzi (1914) as Lina Balzer. She was then in a Broadway play, Stolen Orders (1915). She travelled to Australia and New Zealand in 1916 for another tour lasting more than two years, playing in musicals and other comedies.

Ediss finally returned to England in 1919 and made no further overseas tours. She continued her career in West End theatre, playing in a long-running farce, Lord Richard in the Pantry, with Cyril Maude and Lydia Bilbrook (1919), and then the comedy-thriller The Ghost Train (1923). In 1926 she appeared alongside George Barrett in a production of the farcical comedy Bringing Up Father. She toured the northern provinces in 1928 in the Walter Hackett farce Other Men's Wives. She followed this with a touring revival of Lord Richard in the Pantry. By the 1930s, she acted in a few films: A Warm Corner (1930) as Mrs. Corner, The Temperance Fete (1932) as Mrs. Hearty and Night of the Garter (1933) as Fish.

Ediss was admitted to hospital in November 1933 and was noted as being "seriously ill with heart trouble". She died of heart disease in Brighton in April 1934 at the age of 63. Ediss, who was known as being charitable and gave away thousands of pounds, died a "poor woman" with an estate of £300, which she left to her sister. Her funeral took place at St Anne's Church in Brighton.
