= A Primer of Libertarian Education =

1975 book by Joel Spring

- Author: Joel Spring
- Subject: Education
- Publisher: Black Rose Books
- Publication date: 1975
- Pages: 154

A Primer of Libertarian Education is a 1975 book by Joel Spring on the tradition of libertarian (anarchist) education.

== Bibliography ==
- Nelson, John (December 1976). "A Primer of Libertarian Education". Reason.com.
- Ravitch, Diane (February 1977). "A Primer of Libertarian Education (Book)". Teachers College Record. 78 (3): 391–396. ISSN 0161-4681.
- "Rev. of A Primer of Libertarian Education by Joel Spring". Choice. 12: 1612. 1975. ISSN 0009-4978.
- Sola, Peter A. (1976). "A Primer of Libertarian Education (Book)". Educational Studies. 7 (3): 303. ISSN 0013-1946. EBSCOhost 7580257.
- Welton, Michael R. (1976). "Review of A Primer of Libertarian Education". The Journal of Educational Thought. 10 (2): 154–157. ISSN 0022-0701. JSTOR 23769260.
- Woodcock, George (November 29, 1975). "Anarchist Classics and Collectives". Nation. 221 (18): 565–566. ISSN 0027-8378. EBSCOhost 11300809.
- Yerburgh, Mark R. (November 15, 1975). "A Primer of Libertarian Education (Book Review)". Library Journal. 100 (20): 2142. ISSN 0360-3113. EBSCOhost 5677002.
