= Peter Pettinger =

1925 novel

- 1930 3rd edition
- Author: William Riley
- Language: English
- Genre: Drama
- Publisher: Herbert Jenkins Ltd
- Publication date: 1925
- Publication place: United Kingdom
- Media type: Print

Peter Pettinger is a 1925 novel by the British writer William Riley. In Yorkshire, a mechanic named Peter Pettinger, who has strongly anti-capitalist views, unexpectedly inherits a company and tries to run it on socialist lines.

== Adaptation ==
In 1945 it was adapted into the film The Agitator produced by British National Films, directed by John Harlow and starring William Hartnell.

== Bibliography ==
- Goble, Alan. The Complete Index to Literary Sources in Film. Walter de Gruyter, 199
