= Joel Spring =

American academic

Joel H. Spring (born September 24, 1940) is an American academic at the City University of New York who specializes in American and global educational policy. His major research interests are history of education, globalization and education, multicultural education, Native American culture, the politics of education, and human rights education. He received his Doctor of Philosophy degree in educational policy studies from the University of Wisconsin–Madison.

== Selected works ==
- Pedagogies of Globalization: The Rise of the Educational Security State, (2006) ISBN 978-0-8058-5557-9
- How Educational Ideologies Are Shaping Global Society (2004) ISBN 978-0-8058-4915-8
- Education and the Rise of the Global Economy (1998) ISBN 978-0-8058-3013-2
- A Primer of Libertarian Education (1975)

Textbooks

- American Education (now in its 19th edition, 2020) ISBN 978-1-138-08725-5
- The American School: From the Puritans to the Trump Era (now in its 10th edition, 2018) ISBN 978-0-07-352589-1
- Conflict of Interests: The Politics of American Education (now in its 5th edition)
