= The Temperance Fête =

1932 film directed by Graham Cutts

- Feature on the film from The Sketch ((16 Sept, 1931))
- Directed by: Graham Cutts
- Written by: Reginald Fogwell; Herbert Jenkins
- Produced by: Reginald Fogwell
- Cinematography: William Shenton
- Edited by: Edward Richards
- Production company: Reginald Fogwell Productions
- Release date: 1932
- Running time: 45 minutes
- Country: United Kingdom
- Language: English

The Temperance Fête is a 1932 British comedy film directed by Graham Cutts and starring George Robey, Sydney Fairbrother, and Connie Ediss. It was written by Reginald Fogwell and Herbert Jenkins. The screenplay concerns a waiter at a temperance meeting who spikes the lemonade with alcohol.

== Preservation status ==
The British Film Institute National Archive holds a collection of stills but no film or video materials.

== Premise ==
Bindle's wife has arranged for him to run the lemonade stall at the local temperance meeting. His friend Ginger goes along to assist, and thinking of the money to be made if the "lemonade" sells well, Ginger adds some alcohol.

== Cast ==
- George Robey as Bindle
- Sydney Fairbrother as Mrs. Bindle
- Connie Ediss as Mrs. Hearty
- Gibb McLaughlin as Mr. Hearty
- Seth Egbert as Ginger
- Anita Sharp-Bolster as teacher

== Reception ==
Kine Weekly wrote: "Old fashioned low-comedy sketch, the story of which is taken, and very much mutilated in the process, from The Adventures of Bindle, by Herbert Jenkins. George Robey is not only miscast, but out of his element, and the direction is amateurish. This type of comedy fare is completely outmoded, and its market is strictly limited to the small industrial hall."

The Daily Film Renter wrote: "Broadly farcical treatment, crude in parts, of temperance meeting which becomes inebriated. Robey in a succession of incidents of typical style. Patrons who enjoy his impersonations of drunkenness can indulge their taste here to the limit. Not everyone raves over George Robey's music hall performances, but his fans may enjoy this film."
