= A. S. Neill =

Scottish progressive school founder (1883–1973)

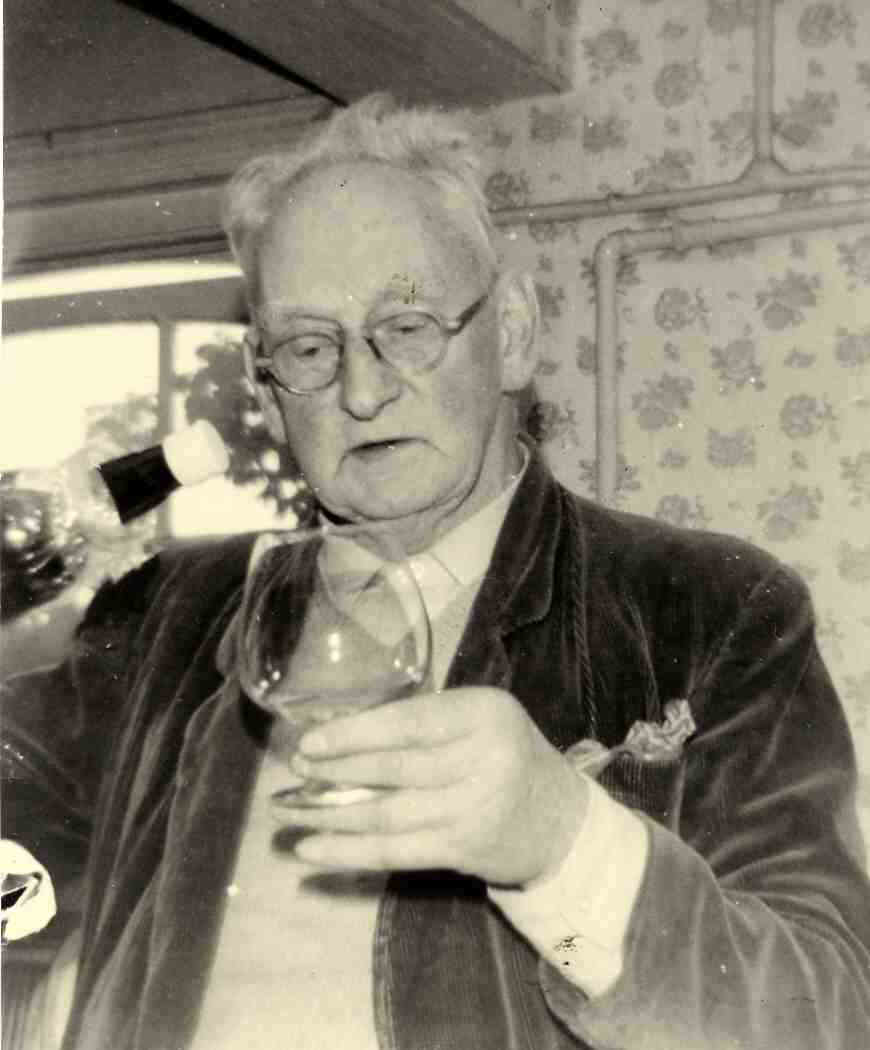
- Born: Alexander Sutherland Neill; 17 October 1883; Forfar, Angus, Scotland
- Died: 23 September 1973 (aged 89); Aldeburgh, Suffolk, England
- Education: University of Edinburgh
- Occupations: Educator, author
- Known for: Founding Summerhill School, advocacy of personal freedom for children, progressive education
- Spouses: Ada Lillian Lindesay Neustätter; Ena May Neill

Alexander Sutherland Neill (17 October 1883 – 23 September 1973) was a Scottish educator and author known for his school, Summerhill, and its philosophy of freedom from adult coercion and community self-governance. Raised in Scotland, Neill taught at several schools before attending the University of Edinburgh in 1908–1912. He took two jobs in journalism before World War I, and taught at Gretna Green Village School in the second year of the war, writing his first book, A Dominie's Log (1915), as a diary of his life there as head teacher. He joined a Dresden school in 1921 and founded Summerhill on returning to England in 1924. Summerhill gained renown in the 1930s and then in the 1960s–1970s, due to progressive and counter-culture interest. Neill wrote 20 books. His top seller was the 1960 Summerhill, read widely in the free school movement from the 1960s.

== Early life and career ==
Alexander Sutherland Neill was born in Forfar, Angus, Scotland, on 17 October 1883 to George Neill and Mary (née Sutherland Sinclair). He was their fourth son; one of the eight surviving children out of 13. He was raised in an austere, Calvinist house with values of fear, guilt, and adult and divine authority, which he later repudiated. As a child, he was obedient, quiet, and uninterested in school. His father was the village dominie (Scottish schoolmaster) of Kingsmuir, near Forfar in eastern Scotland, and his mother had been a teacher before her marriage. The village dominie held a position of prestige, hierarchically beneath that of upper classes, doctors, and clergymen. As was typical of Scottish methods at the time, the dominie controlled overcrowded classrooms with his tawse, as corporal punishment. Neill feared his father, though he later claimed his father's imagination as a role model for good teaching. Scholars have interpreted Neill's harsh childhood as the impetus for his later philosophy, though his father was not shown to be harsher to Allie (as Neill was known) than to anyone else. Neill's mother insisted on high standards for her family, and demanded comportment to set the family apart from the townspeople.

Children usually left the local school for Forfar Academy at the age of 14, and with his father a teacher, Neill was especially expected to do so. Instead of wasting time and money, Neill went to work as a junior clerk in an Edinburgh gas meter factory. His parents took pity on his hatred of the job, homesickness, and its low pay, and so Neill became an apprentice draper in Forfar. He found the work stultifying and came home after a foot inflammation. Neill tried to take an examination that would raise his pay grade, but could not bring himself to study. Now 15, his parents decided to make him his father's assistant "pupil teacher". The children liked Neill, though he received poor marks from a school inspector. He taught a wider range of topics as his self-confidence grew, and he developed an interest in mathematics from the Forfar Academy maths master. After four years, he tried for teacher training college, but came nearly last in his class. He continued as a pupil teacher in Bonnyrigg and Kingskettle, where he found the teachers' instruction militant and loathsome. He stayed in Kingskettle for three years, during which he learned Greek from a local priest, an experience that increased his interest in academicism and sublimated his interest in priesthood into a desire to attend university. After studying with the priest and the Forfar math master, Neill passed his university entrance exam and preliminary teacher's certification.

Neill became an assistant teacher at the Newport Public School in the wealthy Newport-on-Tay, where he learned to dance and appreciate music and theatre. He also fell in love, and Margaret became an obsession of his. He adopted progressive techniques at this school, and abandoned the tawse for other forms of establishing discipline. Neill was friendly and relaxed with his pupils, and described his two years there as "the happiest of [his] life thus far". He finished his university entrance exams and received his full teaching certification.

In 1908, at the age of 25, Neill enrolled in the University of Edinburgh. He began as an agriculture student, at his father's behest for a well-salaried career, but switched to English literature by the end of his first year. Neill was excluded from cultural events due to his lack of funds, but participated in sports, showed interest in the military, and wrote for The Student (the university magazine) and the Glasgow Herald. He became the student paper's editor during his last year, which opened Neill to a world of culture. He also felt more confident to pursue women. In his editorials, Neill criticized the tedium of lectures and the emphasis on tests instead of critical thinking. He began to develop his thoughts about the futility of forced education, and the axiom that all learning came from intrinsic interest. Neill graduated in 1912 and began to edit encyclopedias and similar reference books. He took a new job as art editor of the Piccadilly Magazine, but its operations were halted by the 1914 onset of World War I, in which he served as an officer in the army. He returned to Scotland, working as a head teacher at Gretna Green School during the first year of the war. The diary he wrote for this year was published as a book, A Dominie's Log, in November 1915 by Herbert Jenkins, and received good reviews for its humour and narrative style.

Neill was invited to join a progressive school in Dresden in 1921. The school moved to a monastery near Vienna in 1923, where the townspeople did not receive it well. He moved to England in 1924 and started Summerhill in Lyme Regis, where the name came from the estate.

== Summerhill School ==
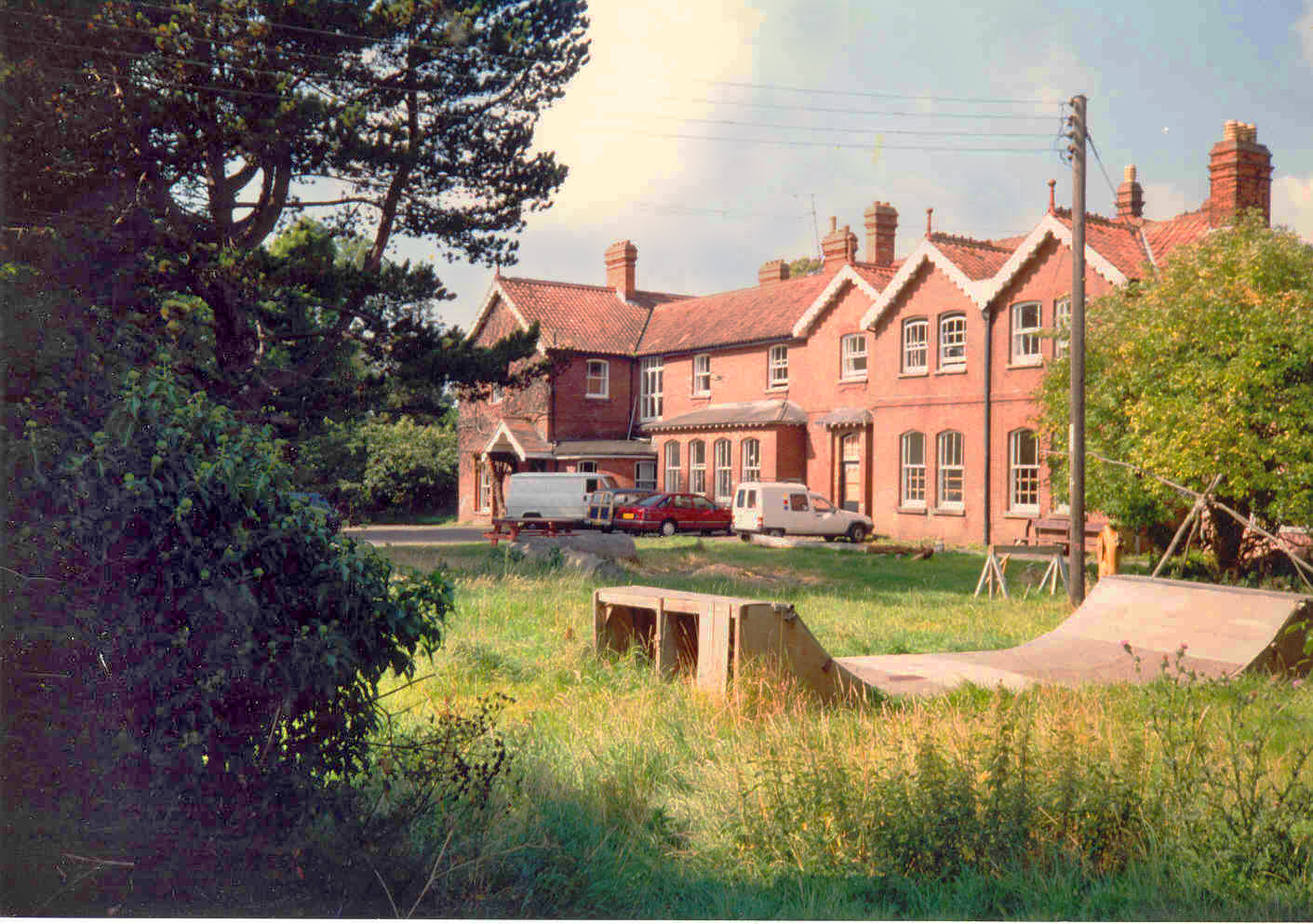
Summerhill, 1993

The school picked up some notoriety and the average enrolment was 40 pupils. In 1927, it moved to Leiston, where it remained.

Neill credited Summerhill's environment instead of himself for the school's reformatory successes. Neill used to offer psychoanalytic therapy ("private lessons", since he was not a licensed therapist) for children who arrived as delinquents from other institutions, but later found love, affirmation and freedom to be better cures.

The Summerhill classroom was popularly assumed to reflect Neill's anti-authoritarian beliefs, though their classes were traditional in practice. Neill did not show outward interest in classroom pedagogy, and was mainly interested in student happiness. He did not consider lesson quality important, and thus there were no distinctive Summerhillian classroom methods. Leonard Waks wrote that, like Homer Lane, Neill thought all teaching should follow student interest, and that teaching method did not matter much once student interest was apparent. In a review of an algebra lesson taught by Neill as recounted through Herb Snitzer's Living at Summerhill, Richard Bailey described Neill's teaching technique as "simply awful" for his lack of student engagement, inarticulate explanations, and insults directed at students. Bailey criticized Neill's absolution of responsibility for his pupils' academic performance, and his view that charismatic instruction was a form of persuasion that weakened child autonomy. Ronald Swartz referred to Neill's method as Socratic, about which Bailey disagreed.

Neill was not religious. Despite this, he would flippantly remark that Summerhill was the only Christian school in England when its philosophy was compared with that of Christ. Neill saw the doctrine of "original sin" as a means of control and sought a world ruled by love and self-examination. Like Freud, he felt that children who were denied understanding of their sexuality in their youth became adults who were similarly fearful of their own sexuality.

== Ideology ==
Neill was sympathetic towards the goal of communism, however he became increasingly critical of Stalinism and the contemporary Communist Party. He wrote to David Barton, a former pupil at the time in the communist party, saying:

You must know that Summerhill couldn't possibly exist under communism as it shapes today ... see our kids salute any flag or portrait? ... I want communism, i.e. a non-profit society, PLUS what Summerhill stands for ... independence of the individual.

== Philosophy ==
Neill felt that children (and human nature) were innately good, and that children naturally became just and virtuous when allowed to grow without adult imposition of morality. Children did not need to be coaxed or goaded into desirable behaviour, as their natural state was satisfactory and their natural inclinations "in no way immoral". If left alone, children would become self-regulating, reasonable and ethical adults. Together with Homer Lane, Neill supported personal freedoms for children to live as they please without adult interference, and called this position "on the side of the child". Neill's practice can be summarised as providing children with space, time, and empowerment for personal exploration and with freedom from adult fear and coercion.

The aim of life, to Neill, was "to find happiness, which means to find interest." Likewise, the purpose of Neill's education was to be happy and interested in life, and children needed complete freedom to find their interests. Neill considered happiness an innate characteristic that deteriorated if children were denied personal freedom. Such unhappiness led to repressed and psychologically disordered adults. He blamed a "sick and unhappy" society for widespread unhappiness. Neill claimed that society harboured fears of life, children and emotions that were continually bequeathed to the next generation. He felt that children turned to self-hate and internal hostility when denied an outlet for expression in adult systems of emotional regulation and manipulation. Likewise, children taught to withhold their sexuality would see such feelings negatively, which would fuel disdain for self. Neill thought that calls for obedience quenched the natural needs of children. Moreover, their needs could not be fulfilled by adults or a society that simultaneously prolonged their unhappiness, although perhaps a school like Summerhill could help.

Neill... believed that the best thing teachers could do was to leave children alone to develop naturally.

— Denis Lawton, Education and Social Justice, p. 78

As for "interest", Neill felt it came organically and spontaneously as a prerequisite for learning. Neill considered forced instruction (without pupil interest) a destructive waste of time. Earlier in his career, he wrote that human interest releases emotions that otherwise congests a person. He added that education's role is to facilitate that release, with Summerhill actualizing this concept. Neill never defines "true interest" and does not account for the social influences on child interest. Bailey felt that this omission discredits Neill's position against external influence. Bailey also cited "adaptive preferences" literature, where human interests change based on their surroundings and circumstances, as evidence of how intrinsic interest can be externally influenced. Bailey also called Neill's views on intelligence as "innatist" and fatalist – that children had naturally set capabilities and limitations. Neill saw contemporary interventionist practice as doing harm by emphasising conformity and stifling children's natural drive to do as they please.

Neill did not identify with the progressive educators of his time. They advocated far gentler authority in child-rearing, which Neill considered more insidious than overt authority and altogether unnecessary. All imposed authority, even if meant well, was unjustified. He felt that adults asserted authority for its feelings of power, and that this motive was a type of repression. In Neill's philosophy, the goal was maintenance of happiness through avoidance of repressive habits from society. Despite Neill's common citation as a leader within progressive education, his ideas were considerably more radical, and he was called an extremist by other radicals. Unlike Friedrich Fröbel, Neill did not view children with romantic innocence. He saw their animalistic traits as qualities to be "outgrown with time and freedom". Neill also considered his role in providing emotional support.

Emotional education trumped intellectual needs, in Neill's eyes, and he was associated with anti-intellectualism. In actuality, he had a personal interest in scholarship and used his autobiography near the end of his life to profess the necessity of both emotion and intellect in education, though he often took jabs at what he saw to be education's overemphasis on book-learning. Neill felt that an emotional education freed the intellect to follow what it pleased, and that children required an emotional education to keep up with their own gradual developmental needs. This education usually entailed copious amounts of play and distance from the adult anxieties of work and ambition. Neill was influenced by Sigmund Freud's theories of psychoanalysis, Homer Lane's interpretation of Freud, and later, by the unorthodox sexual theories of Wilhelm Reich. The reverence for Reich appears in the abundant correspondence between them. Neill accepted Reich's claims about cosmic energy and his utopian ideas on human sexuality. In Reich's view, "discharge" of sexual energy leads to happiness, whereas lack of such discharge leads to unhappiness and "rigidity". Although not a trained therapist, Neill gave psychoanalytic private lessons to individual children, designed to unblock impasses in their inner energies. Neill also offered body massage, as suggested by Reich. Neill later found that freedom cured better than this therapy.

Richard Bailey placed Neill alongside William Godwin, Jean-Jacques Rousseau, Voltaire, and Robert Owen in Thomas Sowell's "unconstrained vision" tradition, where human potential is naturally unlimited and human development is dependent on environment and not incentives. Bailey also compared Neill's thoughts on coercion to those of Godwin, who felt that regulation through reward and punishment stunted growth. Neill saw moral instruction as a wedge between natural instinct and conformity and thought children were best off without it. Neill trusted the natural inclinations of children and saw no need to externally and purposefully influence their behaviour. Denis Lawton likened Neill's ideas to Rousseauan "negative education", where children discover for themselves instead of receiving instruction. Neill is commonly associated with Rousseau for their similar thoughts on human nature, although Neill claimed to not have read Rousseau's Emile, or On Education until near the end of his life. John Cleverley and D. C. Phillips declared Neill "the most notable figure in the Rousseauean tradition", and Frank Flanagan credited Neill with actualising what Rousseau envisaged. Marc-Alexandre Prud-homme and Giuliano Reis found the comparison "inappropriate" on the basis of Rousseau's views on gender.

Peter Hobson found Neill's philosophy of education incomplete, oversimplified, without a "coherent theory of knowledge", and too dependent on his experience instead of philosophical position. When presented with Hobson's position, four experts on Neill and Summerhill considered his assertions "irrelevant". Joel Spring likened Neill's views on the family to that of Mary Wollstonecraft, in that the parents would share power equally.

=== Freedom, not licence ===
When Neill said children should be free, he did not mean complete freedom, but freedom without licence—that everyone can do as they like unless such action encroaches upon another's freedom. As such, adults could and should protect children from danger, but not trample their self-regulation. Neill emphasised that adult removal from child affairs was distinct from disregard for their security. He felt that children met their own limits naturally. Neill believed in equal rights between parents and children, and that undesirable "disciplined" or "spoiled" homes were created when those rights were imbalanced. He felt it unnecessary to fulfil all of childhood's requests and had great disdain for spoiled children. Summerhill children were naturally restricted by the school's limited teaching expertise and low funds.

Bailey wrote that Neill did not have full faith in self-regulation due to his emphasis on the necessity of making specific environments for children. Robin Barrow argued that Neill's idea of self-regulation was contradictory, when its intent was, more simply, the extent to which children need to abide by external restraints. Bailey added that children cannot know the extent to which dull and unknown subjects can be exciting without guidance. He felt that Neill's belief in children's innate and realistic wisdom did not accommodate human characteristics "such as error, prejudice, and ignorance", ascribed genius-level intelligence to children, and did not consider social aspects in child decision-making.

=== Self-governance ===
Self-governance was a central idea to Summerhill, and is perhaps its "most fundamental feature". Summerhill held a weekly general meeting that decided the school's rules and settled school disputes, where every member of the community—staff and student alike—had a single vote. Almost everyone in the school attended the meeting, and children always held the majority. Meetings were managed by an elected chairperson. At times, the school had over 200 rules. His daughter says that although he was seen as benign he allowed Ena May Neill to berate the weekly meetings and she increasingly ran the school becoming the head, officially, when he died.

Summerhill sought to produce individualists conscious of their surrounding social order, and Neill chose the self-governance of Homer Lane's Little Commonwealth for the basis of that lesson. The general meeting replaced teacher authority with communal control, which freed teachers from their roles as disciplinarians and instructed children in the role of democratic participation and the role of rules. Additionally, reports of teacher–student disputes were rare. Neill felt that the community's authority never created resentment in those subject to sanctions. Sven Muller contended that the meeting was more useful than discipline for creating civic-minded citizens. An ex-pupil recalled some of the wild ideas Neill would propose at the meeting, and while the students would vote him down, she later recounted how the exercise was also intended as a lesson for the staff on the power of the meeting and communal authority. Neill considered self-governance "the most valuable asset in education and life" and the general meeting "more important than all the textbooks in the world".

On occasion, Neill exercised unilateral decision-making as the owner of the school, despite his emphasis on the authority figure-less nature of the school. Instances include when he once made a decision after the group's discussion protracted, and when he once asserted himself dictator. Ultimately, the school's freedom was Neill's to structure.

== Writings ==
Neill wrote 20 books in his lifetime. His style was simple and friendly, unlike didactic literature from the era. His topics included the balance of authority and the thoughts–feelings relationship.

- 1917: A Dominie Abroad.
- 1917: A Dominie Dismissed. New York: R. McBride & Co.
- 1918: A Dominie’s Log. London: Herbert Jenkins Ltd.
- 1922: A Dominie in Doubt. New York: Robert M. McBride & Co.
- 1921: Carroty Broon. London: Herbert Jenkins.
- 1924: A Dominie’s Five. London: Herbert Jenkins.
- 1925: The Booming of Bunkie. London: Herbert Jenkins.
- 1927: The Problem Child. New York: Robert M. McBride & Co.
- 1932: The Problem Parent. London: Herbert Jenkins.
- 1936: Is Scotland educated? London: G. Routledge and Sons.
- 1938: The Last Man Alive. A Story for Children From The Age of Seven to Seventy, Herbert Jenkins, London 1938.
- 1939: The Problem Teacher. London: Herbert Jenkins.
- 1944: The Problem Teacher. New York: International University Press.
- 1948: That Dreadful School. London: Herbert Jenkins, Ltd.
- 1949: The problem family; an investigation of human relations.
- 1953: The Free Child. London: Herbert Jenkins.
- 1960: Summerhill: a radical approach to child rearing (Foreword by Erich Fromm). (Also published, 1962, London: Victor Gollancz.)
- 1968: Summerhill. Pelican Books.
- 1966: Freedom--not license! New York: Hart Publishing Co.
- 1967: Talking of Summerhill. London: Victor Gollancz.
- 1970: Summerhill. For & Against. New York: Hart Publishing Co.
- 1972: Neill! Neill! Orange Peel! A Personal View of Ninety Years. New York: Hart Publishing Co. (Also published in Great Britain, in a revised edition, 1973, London: Weidenfeld and Nicolson.)

=== Summerhill ===
The 1960 release of Summerhill catapulted Neill into the public view. Richard Bailey described its result as "an American cult" of Summerhillian schools and their support organizations. The book sold well and made Neill into a figurehead of new interest in education. Bailey added that the unpretentious book's message was easier to impart than Deweyan thought, and that its release inspired Neill's education critic contemporaries as to the viability of their ideas.

== Reception and legacy ==
Critics regard Neill's influence and importance with mixed opinion. Supporters counted Neill amongst the world's most influential educationists. UNESCO listed Neill within its 100 most important educationists worldwide. The Times Educational Supplement listed him in its 12 most important British educationists of the millennium. Herb Kohl declared Neill "one of the greatest democratic educators of the last century" in 2005. Academics and teachers cited Summerhill as the common ancestor for free schools, and Neill was poised to become a public figure during Summerhill's heyday in the 1970s. Its detractors do not classify Summerhill as a school. Writer and Republican politician Max Rafferty called Summerhill "a caricature of education" and felt threatened by the implications of "the spread of Neill's hedonism to the majority of the next generation". Others criticized Neill for his progressive ideals despite agreement on his critique of traditional schools, and bemoaned his "outdated radicalism" and "dangerously enthusiastic following in teaching training institutions".

Richard Bailey wrote that Summerhill received most of its public attention in the 1920s to 1930s and in the 1960s to 1970s, which were eras of social change (progressivism and the counterculture, respectively). Neill was known in British education circles by the 1920s and was "probably Britain's first educational celebrity" in the 1930s, though he was not driven by his reception. Journal reviews called Neill "the most popular writer on education today" and said of his works: "Nearly all the more alive and up-to-date teachers in Britain have read and argued about his notions." He was known via his books as a figure in the new psychoanalysis. The accessible 1960 Summerhill crowned Neill the leader of a new avant-garde education and he became symbolic of the rebel decade.

Neill is generally associated with democratic schools as a leader in its tradition. H. A. T. Child associated Summerhill with the Bedales School, Alfred the Great, and Child's Dartington Hall School, and David Gribble wrote in 1998 about schools around the world that followed Neill's teachings. Timothy Gray linked the release of Summerhill with the rise of writers Herb Kohl, Jonathan Kozol, Neil Postman, and Ivan Illich. Scholars debate whether Neill fits best in a progressive or more radical tradition. Other schools inspired by Neill's philosophy in the UK include Sands School in Devon, Sherwood School in Epsom and Kirkdale School in London.

Few of Neill's acolytes continued his work after his death. His family maintained Summerhill, with Neill's daughter as its headmaster as of 2026. Others influenced by Neill included John Aitkenhead, Michael Duane, and R. F. Mackenzie. Richard Bailey wrote that Maria Montessori and Rudolf Steiner's followers were more evangelical in character, and that Neill deterred would-be devotees. He specifically discouraged American association with his school in both name and likeness. By 1972, Ray Hemmings wrote that Neill's ideas were misinterpreted in the hands of other schools. Hemmings found Neill to have moderate influence on state schools in areas such as teacher–student interactions. Neill's views on sexuality and non-compulsory lessons did not have widespread acceptance. Herb Snitzer said that Neill "influenced thousand of teachers". Both George Dennison and Bailey felt Neill's influence to not be easily measurable, with Dennison adding that non-Summerhill schools continue to adopt Neillian thought.

Neill was awarded three honorary degrees: a master's and two honorary doctorates. One doctorate was from Newcastle University in 1966. He was reportedly very proud of the awards.
