= Homer Lane =

American-English educator (1875–1925)

Homer Lane (1875–1925) was an American-born educator who believed that the behavior and character of children improved when they were given more control over their lives. Bertrand Russell called him "one of the best men of his generation".

== Background ==
Lane was born in Connecticut. He left school early and took a job delivering groceries, where he met a doctor who helped him take a course at Boston's Sloyd Training College. He began to teach in a high school that his sponsor later opened.

Lane had two children by his first wife, Cora Barney, and three by his second wife. They also adopted a daughter. He died from typhus in Paris after having been deported from England for failing to maintain his alien registration. His family remained in England.

== Career ==
Lane started his teaching career at Peters High School in Southborough, Massachusetts. In the spring of 1907 he settled in the Detroit area. He held several teaching positions in the city and became the director of the Solvay Guild. He first introduced his notion of self-government at the Jewish settlement house called Hannah Schloss Memorial Building. Lane was appointed superintendent of the Boys Home and d'Arcambal Association in Farmington Hills, where he worked with youths who had run afoul of the law. The program that Lane developed at the school was geared toward building the boys' self-respect and self-reliance and toward giving them an opportunity to practice self-government.

In 1912 he was invited to go to England where he founded the Little Commonwealth school in Dorset and greatly influenced A. S. Neill, the founder of Summerhill School. In December 1917, two sixteen-year-old girls under Lane's care accused him of sexually assaulting them, one of whom reported her allegations to the police. The subsequent Home Office inquiry, which demanded Lane's removal as superintendent, led to the closure of the school in the summer of 1918, though Lane was never subject to criminal investigation. Historian Lucy Delap identifies the allegations made against Homer Lane as the 'first well-documented case of alleged institutional child sexual abuse in Britain.'

== Influence ==
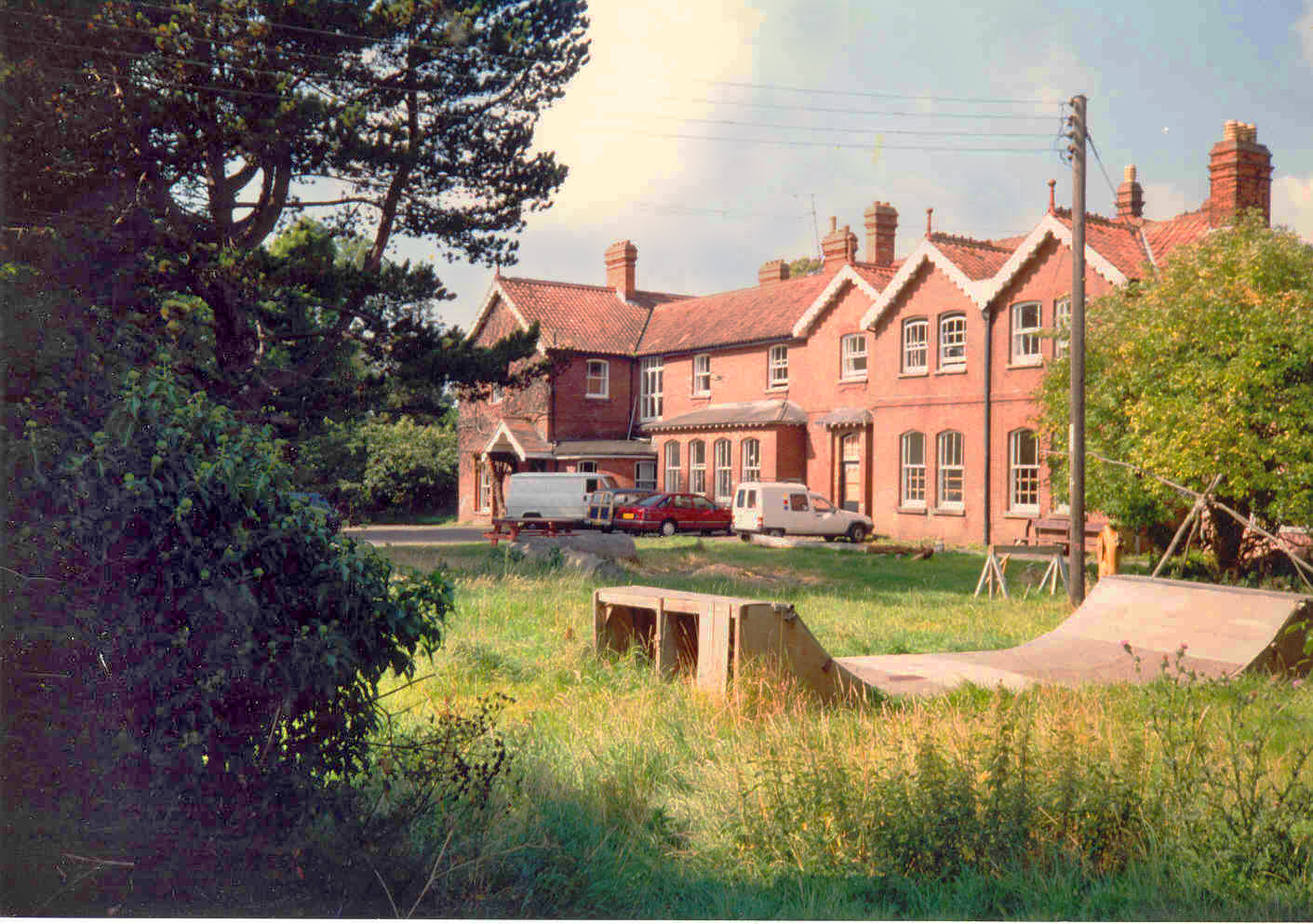
Homer Lane's Little Commonwealth influenced the foundation of Alexander S. Neill's Summerhill School.

Lane's foremost disciple was his patient, Alexander S. Neill. Neill claimed that he was particularly impressed by Lane's ideas about an experimental self-governing community for young delinquents since it eliminates the negative effects of authority and breeds altruism among those who participate. Neill began Summerhill, a school that offered a unique approach to education based on the idea that children are good and - if left alone - are capable of self-governing, motivating, and directing their lives and learning. which became exceptionally well known after American publisher Harold Hart published Summerhill: A Radical Approach to Child Rearing in 1960. The book sold 200,000 copies. Hart had never before published a trade book, being a publisher of children's books and having been advised strongly against publishing Neill's. He was given moral support by a number of alternative educators in the United States, but took on the project on his own.

The American school, Summerlane, in North Branch, New York, was explicitly named for Summerhill and Homer Lane. It began in 1963 in North Carolina but was burned by racists and moved to Mileses, New York, then settled near North Branch, in farmland near the hamlet of Roscoe, New York, off Highway 17.

== Bibliography ==
More information can be found from the following sources:

- Homer Lane Talks to Parents and Teachers, Allen & Unwin, London, 1928
- http://www.infed.org/thinkers/homerlane.htm, Homer Lane and The Little Commonwealth (an excerpt from Homer Lane's "Talks")
- von Hilsheimer, G. Is There A Science of Behavior, Humanitas, Maitland, Fl 1967; How To Live With Your Special Child, Acropolis Books, 1970 (also published as Understanding Young People in Trouble, Acropolis Books, 1970, soft cover); Summerhill: A radical approach to education, IN Values for a changing America, Hellen Huus, ed., University of Pennsylvania Press, 1975 pp 59–75; Children, Schools and Utopias. This Magazine is about Schools, 1966, 23-37
- W.David Wills, Homer Lane: A biography, Allen & Unwin, 1964
- Aichorn, August, Wayward Youth, New York, Viking Press, 1935
- Aiken, W.M. Adventure in American education, 5 vol., New York, Harper & Brothers, 1942
- Allen, Lady of Hurtwood; Hurd H. et al. Adventure playgrounds, National Playing Fields Association, London, 1960
- Binns, H.B., A Century of Education: 1808–1908, London, J.M. Dent & Co., 1908
- Brehony, K. J. The genesis and disappearance of Homer Lane's Little Commonwealth: A Weberian analysis. Persistenz und Verschwinden. / Persistence and Disappearance: Pädagogische Organisationen im historischen Kontext. / Educational Organizations in their historical Contexts in M. Göhlich, C. Hopf and D. Tröhler (Eds.). Wiesbaden, VS Verlag für Sozialwissenschaften: 237–53, 2008.
- Burns, M., Mr. Lyward's Answer, London, Hamish Hamilton, 1956
- Holms, G., The Idiot Teacher, Longon, Faber & Faber, 1952
- Holt, John, How Children Fail, New York, Pittman, 1964
- Holt, John, How Children Learn, New York, Pittman, 1966
- Makarenko, A.S., A Book for Parents, Moscow, Foreign Languages Publishing House, 1954; Learning to Live, Moscow, Foreign Languages Publishing House, 1953; The Road to Life, 3 vol., Moscow, Foreign Languages Publishing House, 1951
- National Playing Fields Association, Adventure Playgrounds, 71 Escleston Square, London SW1, 1960, pamphlets; Planning an imaginative children's playground without leadership, mimeograph, 1964
- Neill, A. S., Summerhill: A radical approach to child rearing. New York, Harold Hart, 1960
- Pearse, J.H. & Crocker, L.H., The Peckham Experiment: a study in the living structure of society. London, Allen & Unwin for the Sir Halley Steart Trust, 1943
- Powers, E. & Witmer, H., An experiment in the prevention of delinquency: The Cambridge-Somerville Youth Study, New York: Columbia U. Press, 1951
- Spiel, Oskar., Discipline Without Punishment. London, Faber & Faber, 1962
- Wills, W. David. Homer Lane: A Biography, London, Allen & Unwin, 1964; The Hawkspur Experiment, London, Allen & Unwin, date unknown
