= A Dominie's Log =

Book by A. S. Neill

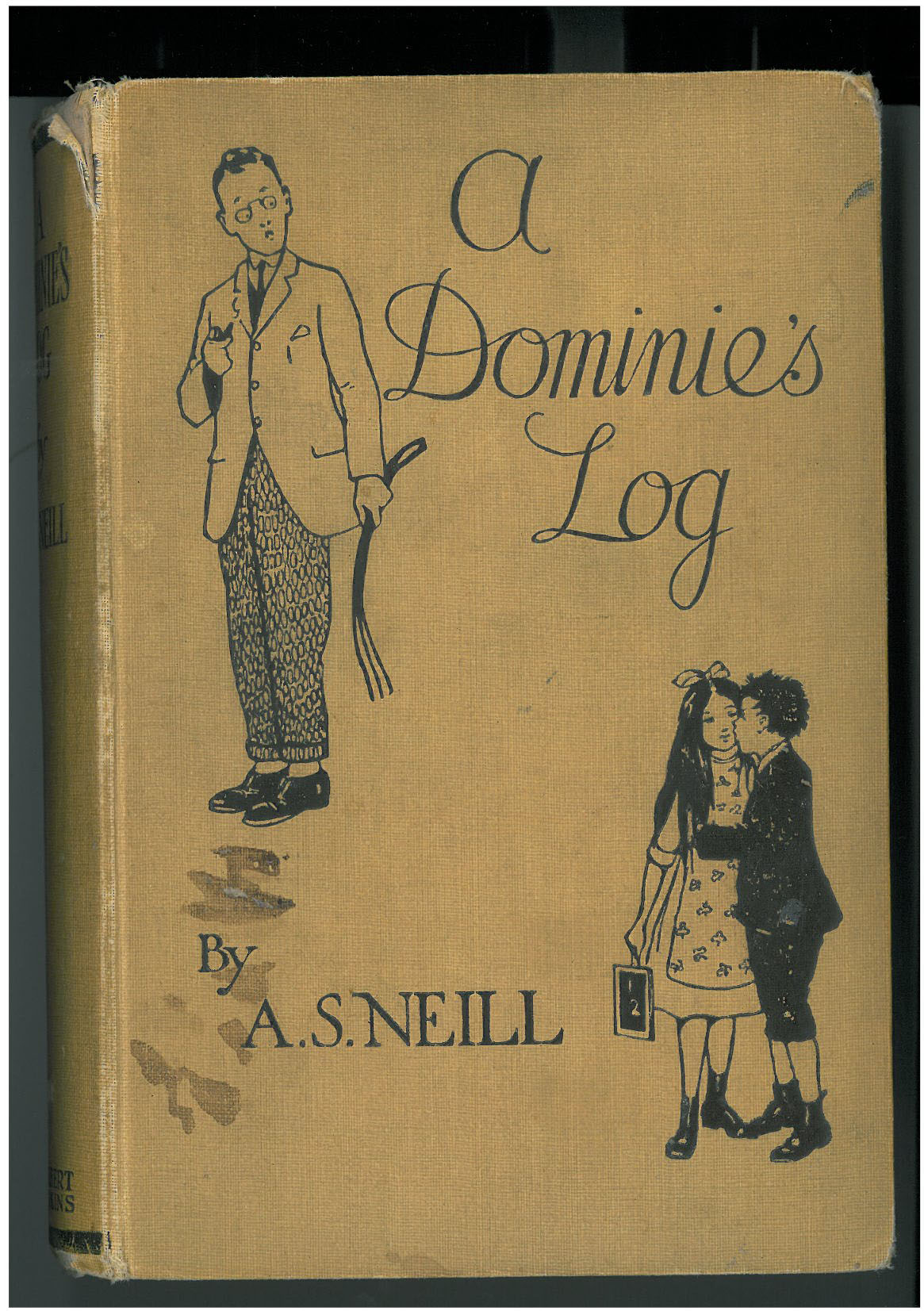
Original cover, 1915

A.S. Neill's A Dominie's Log is a diary of his first year as headteacher at Gretna Green Village School, during 1914–15. It is an autobiographical novel. He changed a hard working, academic school controlled by corporal punishment and the fear of the authority of the teacher into one of happiness, play and children controlling their learning. He was a reflective teacher, sitting on his desk thinking out why he and the children were at the school. He also, most importantly, thought the children were human beings, and engaged with them as such, joining in their games, sliding with them on an ice slide in the street, sharing their sweets, laughing with them, and appreciating and respecting their individuality, and creativity.

== Celebrating the practising teacher ==
Most images of teachers are about the individual as hero overcoming the problems of school and parents and leading the children to enlightenment. Like the heroes of fairy tales they do not challenge or change the system, they are simply heroes of the system, if only all teachers were like them. To Neill the children, and their school and local community, are the heroes, they are the ones that he sees as helping the child to be happy, healthy and free. In the first review it states that he has opinions on everything, but that was to miss the point, that the issues of the school and its children impinge on political and cultural life, they are not separate. Neill is thinking of the culture of childhood and schooling, not of the school as a place for effective, efficient methods and positive measurable outcomes. The story is about him trying to 'create an attitude'. Indeed, after ten years of teaching, in 1921 he creates a school, a community, that is the hero, Summerhill School. Its formation is portrayed in A Dominie Abroad, and the Children's BBC producer, Jon East, uses it to get audiences to question what a school is in his drama about the school and its fight with Ofsted inspectors, Summerhill.

"An awful lot of drama is set in schools - and yet each series only reinforces the dominant paradigm," Jon East says. "What we're trying to say in this drama is that there could just be another way of doing things."

Neill reads the war news everyday to discuss with the children. He uses Ibsen's play An Enemy of the People, replacing that day's bible lesson, to question the justice of democracy when the mob rules. This book, the way it is written, the way he thinks through issues, the way it ends, can be seen as representing all those teachers who at that time helped create the community known as New Ideals in Education Conferences. They believed in the foundation value for all schools and children's communities, of 'liberating the child from the authority of the teacher'.

== Basing schools on children's rights ==
It was recognised by the New Ideal's teachers, professors, soldiers, politicians, headteachers, artists, musicians, actors... that the liberty of the child, the autonomy of the learner, their creativity, self-expression, their search for knowledge and learning was the hope for a world of justice and peace.

"In the first place, this amazing Conference at which we have seen sitting side by side Government Officials, advanced Montessorians, antediluvian Teachers like myself, University Professors, Soldiers in khaki, Musicians, Artists, Headmasters of Public Schools, the superintendent of the Little Commonwealth, Primary Schoolteachers, and the American Ambassador himself stands, first and foremost, for Freedom, - I do not like "emancipation", for the word suggests slavery, and the use of it probably promotes it. We have all agreed that the child is to be free: yes, but the teacher must be free as well as the child..."—Mr Lionel Helbert, Headmaster of West Downs, Winchester, 1915.

Neill in A Dominie's Log writes about the children's ice slide being salted by the policeman to protect the property of the farmers, their horses. He reflects with the children that they have no voice because they have no vote, he compares them to women, and women's low pay and menial jobs. He suggests they write a charter of children's rights. As through the whole book he does not do what teachers so often do now, turn things into projects, getting the kids to role play a campaign or draw cartoons of their plans for play in the town and its streets, but to look at the issue in terms of power, and how to get equality!

== Need for a culture and shared history of children's rights ==
For all rights movements to succeed they build on their history, on changes their struggles have caused, and just as importantly on the culture of struggle they have created. This empowers them to feel a part of a movement, a successful, heroic struggle, with numerous examples of small successes that help to build the momentum for sustained change in laws and attitudes. Children and teachers need to feel they are a part of an historical struggle for the rights of the child. A Dominie's Log is one personal story of a headteacher, it is representative of a whole movement, New Ideals, and it is vital that we celebrate and share this history, so that it effects the present.

Evidence has been submitted to the Select Committee on Education for their meeting with the Children's Commissioner, Anne Longfield OBE, to discuss her new report 'Ambitious for Children' (August 2015). It is trying to input into the discussion of the voice of the child, and their future society and culture, the importance of this history.

== Reviewed in November 1915 ==
On Friday 5 November 1915 The Yorkshire Post in its far right column on page 3, under the title "New Books Received Yesterday" lists 14 books ranging from Nurse Cavell, the Story of her Life and Martyrdom to Toy Making at Home and Morals for the Young. The fourth book on the list, after Furniture Collector, is A Dominie’s Log by A.S.Neill, MA.

One of the earliest reviews is in the Edinburgh Evening News, Monday 15 November 1915:

A Dominie's Log, by Mr A. S. Neill, MA, introduces a new Scottish humorist of a very entertaining type. It is not the anecdotage of a superannuated wielder of the tawse, but the diary of an up-to-date young man of moods and ideas, with the gift of giving these pointed expression. Mr Neill is not enamoured of the present educational system, and in its short-comings he finds ample scope for the exercise of trenchant criticism and pungent wit. He has "a great work" with his bairns, who under his regime have a joyous time, for their teacher is "much more interested in humanity than materials." His go-as-you-please scheme would hardly lend itself to general application, but having surveyed the happy picture Mr Neill sketches, "More’s the pity." The author however, does not confine his random reflections to matters educational. He has views on most things under the sun, and these are well worth adding to the general stock of wisdom and humour. If, as in his blue moods he seems tempted to do, Mr Neill forsakes the scholastic profession, one may hope that he will give us more of these diverting chronicles. The book is published by Messrs Herbert Jenkins, Ltd., London, at 2s 6d.

== Centenary ==
To celebrate the centenary of A.S. Neill's first book one hundred copies of a special edition are being sent to key cultural, creative, educational and political figures during November (the month of its publication). They are all being invited to take part in the centenary celebrations of the book, by contributing to a final centenary edition, and by responding to the book through their creativity or public appearances. A series of events will be held during the year.

“In this centenary of industrial warfare we need to remind people, especially our children, of the culture of success and happiness that this book is a part of, and that we still have a long way to go to have happy schools based on the dignity of our children.”

Challenging the current failure to learn from history and examples of good practice in our schools, and the obsession of focusing on innovation, measurement and outcomes, the book reminds us that schools at the beginning of World War One were better than schools now. It reminds us of the concept of the good primary school being child-centred, based on creative learning, play, learning by doing, group work, learning from the natural world, making decisions and taking responsibility for their learning and their community. We must claim these back as the foundations of our schools.
