= Willie Riley =

English novelist (1866–1961)

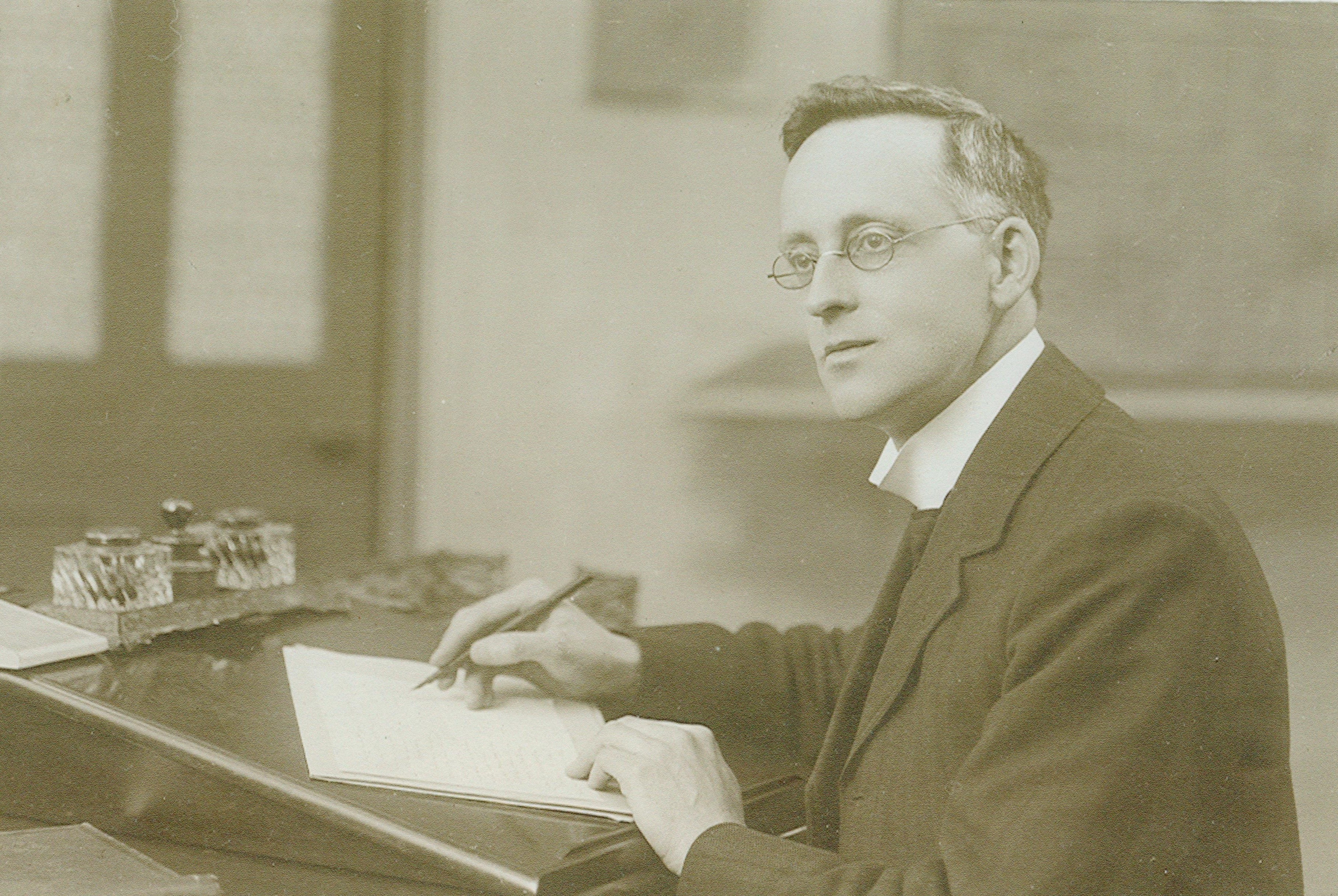
- Riley in 1912
- Born: 23 April 1866; Laisterdyke, Bradford
- Died: 4 June 1961 (aged 95)
- Occupation: Novelist

William Riley (23 April 1866 – 4 June 1961) was an English novelist. He was born in Laisterdyke, Bradford. He wrote 39 books using the name W. Riley, mostly fiction and mostly published by Herbert Jenkins Ltd.

== Education ==
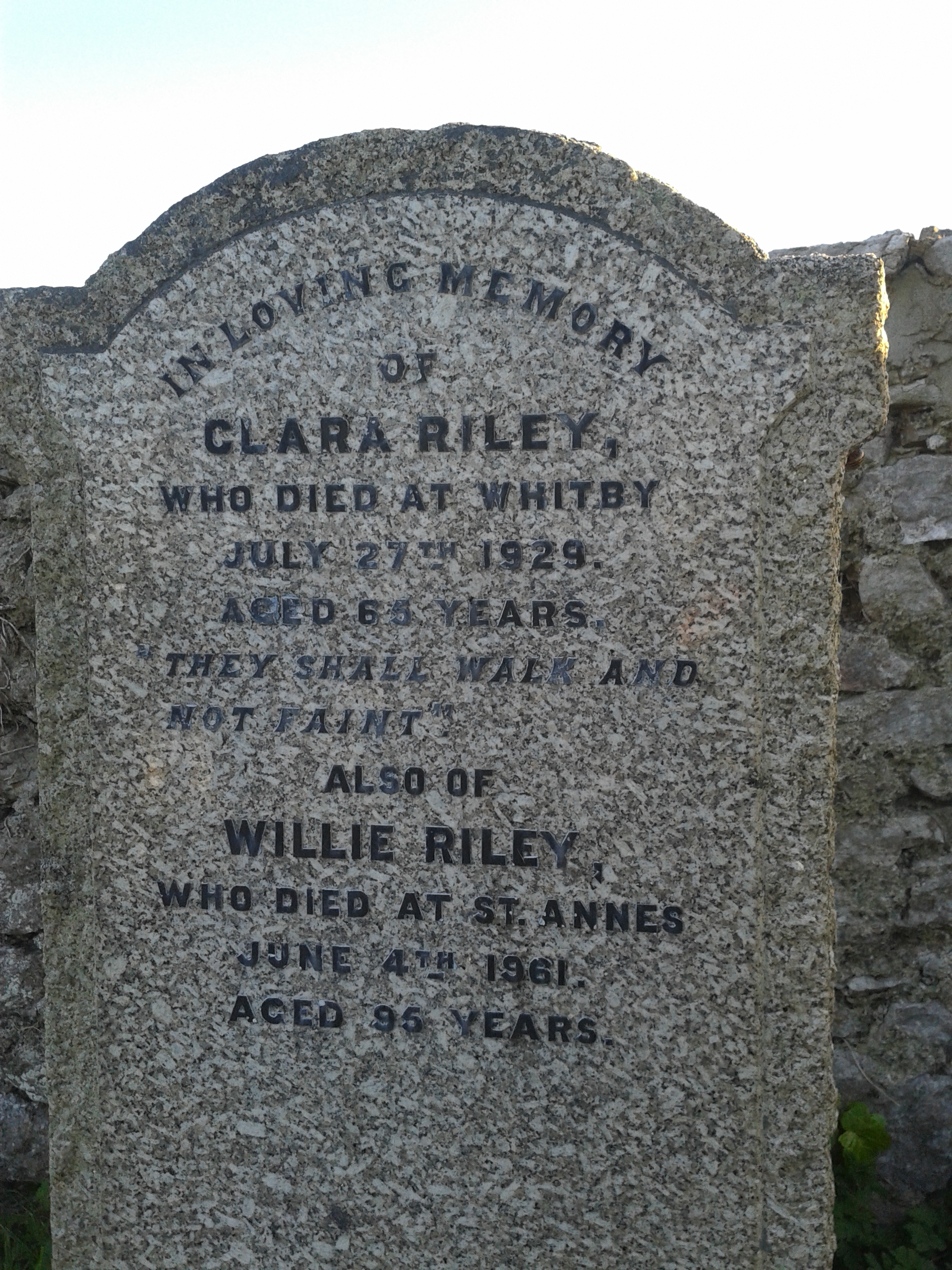
Gravestone of Willie Riley and his first wife Clara at Silverdale

After an education at Bradford Grammar School he entered his father's business in textiles, but two years later the firm diversified and William led the innovative new business in the sale of magic lantern slides and equipment. The business was successful until 1914, when, with the onset of World War I, it failed: Riley then developed a second career as a writer, having already published Windyridge.

== Literary career ==
His first novel Windyridge was written as a series of weekly chapters, in the winter of early 1911, to entertain his wife and two friends, the Bolton sisters, whose parents and third sister had all recently died. He quotes himself as saying "I tell you what I'll do, I'll write a story and read each chapter to you as I go along, week by week. It may help to keep us from brooding". The story is set in the village of Hawksworth near Baildon. He completed the tale in early 1912, having paused in his writing over the summer, and was persuaded to submit it for publication. He agreed to send it to just one publishing house, and chose this by writing on slips of paper the names of three established houses and the novice publisher Herbert Jenkins. It was this last slip which he selected, and Jenkins agreed to publish the book, as his firm's first publication.

In 1919 he moved to Silverdale, Lancashire for the sake of his wife's health, and named his house, 8 Wallings Lane, Windyridge after his novel. The name was removed by subsequent occupiers, but as of 2026 the house still stands. In his autobiography, Sunset Reflections (1957), he recalls tales of life in Silverdale, where amongst other activities he was chair of the Building Committee for the Gaskell Memorial Hall. The clock on the exterior of Silverdale Methodist Church was presented to the church in 1938 "to the glory of God and to mark [the donor's] appreciation of the wholesome contributions to literature of Mr. W. Riley, a member of this church".

== Legacy ==
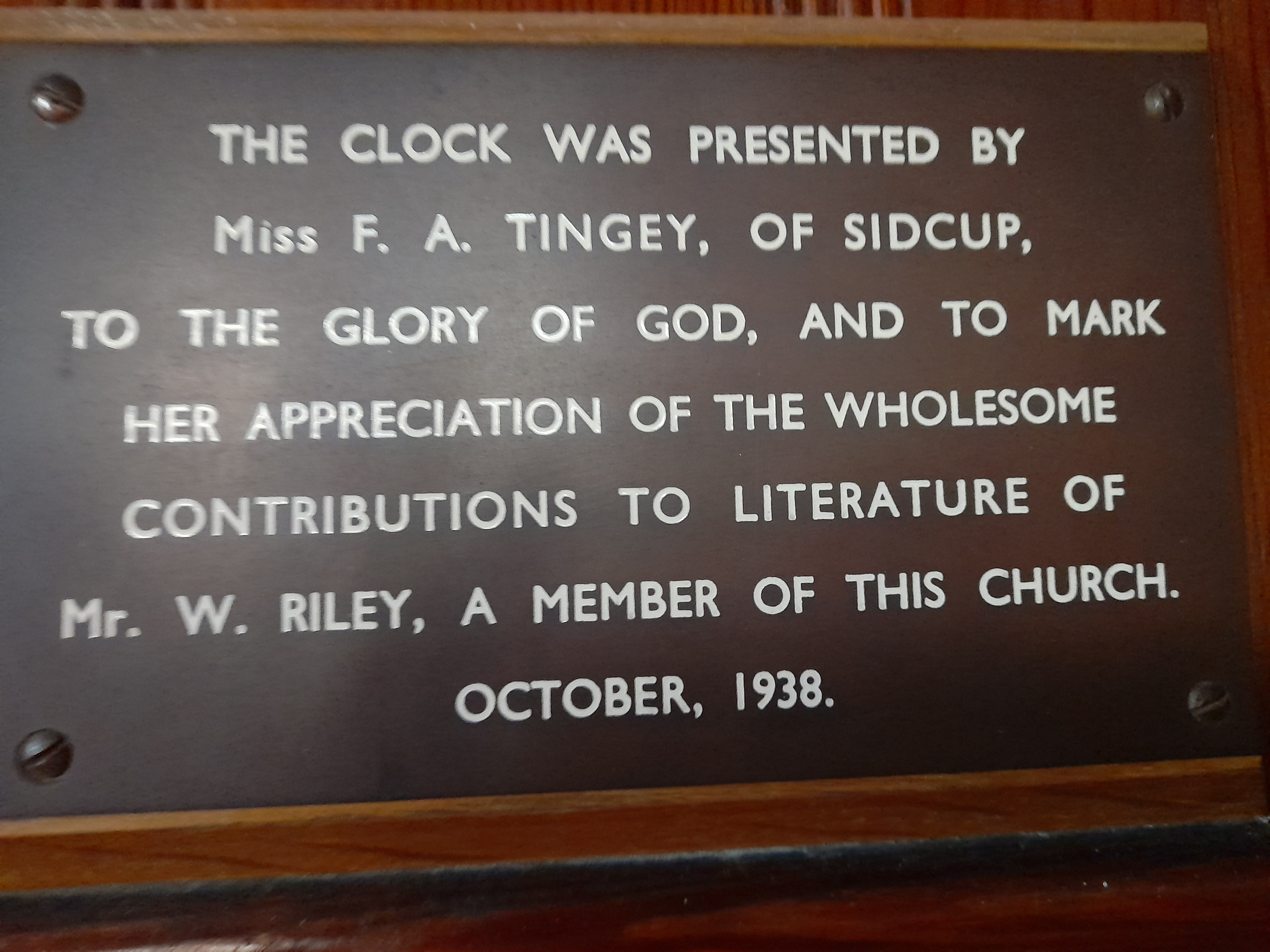
Plaque in the rear porch of Silverdale Methodist Church

The University of Bradford Library's Special Collections department holds an archive of Willie Riley's manuscripts and other papers and a collection of his books. Shortly before his death Riley donated his manuscript of Windyridge to Leeds Central Library. In 2017, a relative of Riley's donated to the Leeds Central Library a complete set of his books. Many of these have personal dedications by the author written inside to members of his family, mainly his first wife, Clara, and second wife, Edith. Riley pasted newspaper reviews inside the books and the collection also contains a number of his unpublished short novels, sermons and book reviews.

His death was recorded in obituaries in The Times and other local and national newspapers. He was buried in the village graveyard at Silverdale, along with his first wife Clara.

== Bibliography ==
All fiction and published by Herbert Jenkins Ltd. except where otherwise stated.

- Windyridge 1912
- Netherleigh 1915
- Way of the Winepress 1916
- Number Seven Brick Row 1918
- Olive of Sylcote 1918
- Through a Yorkshire Window 1919
- Jerry and Ben 1919
- A Yorkshire Suburb 1920
- The Lady of the Lawn 1920
- Men of Mawm 1921
- Rachael Bland's Inheritance 1922
- The Garden of Delight 1923
- Laycock of Lonedale 1924
- Peter Pettinger 1925
- A Village in Craven 1925
- Children of the Outcast 1926
- Late Harvest/Lord's Poor Brother 1927 [Plays]
- Windyridge Revisited 1928
- Witch Hazel 1928
- Doctor Dick 1929
- Squire Goodall 1930
- Kit of Kit's Folly 1931
- The Silver Dale 1932 [Topography]
- Old Obbutt 1933
- Yorkshire Pennines 1934 [Topography]
- Jack and John 1935
- The Man of Anathoth 1936
- Old Asa and other Stories 1936 (Epworth Press)
- The Sixpenny Man 1937
- Gold Chains 1938
- The Valley of Baca 1939
- The Voice in the Garden 1940
- Common Clay 1941
- Grapes from Thorns 1943
- A Stick for God 1946
- Services of Song 1954 [Religion] (Epworth Press)
- Sunset Reflections 1957 [Autobiography]
- In the Silver Dale 1958 [Topography] (Dalesman)
- The Man and the Mountain 1961
