= R. F. Mackenzie =

Scottish educator (1910–1987)

R F Mackenzie (1910–1987), a Scottish educationalist and headteacher, was one of the most original and controversial thinkers in 20th century Scotland.

He was born in Garioch in Aberdeenshire and attended Robert Gordon's College and the University of Aberdeen. Following active service in the RAF during the Second World War, he qualified as a teacher.

He was an advocate of the abolition of corporal punishment and he endeavoured to promote a progressive curriculum in secondary schools. Mackenzie published his opinions in a series of books in which he challenged the dominance of exams and a utilitarian educational ethos.

RF Mackenzie wrote and published three books, often referred to as 'the trilogy', while he was headteacher at Braehead Junior Secondary School in Buckhaven.

- A Question of Living, published in 1963
- Escape from the Classroom, published in 1965 - Introduction by Gavin Maxwell
- The Sins of the Children, published in 1967

In April 1974 he was dismissed from his headteacher post in Summerhill Academy in Aberdeen following public criticism of his liberal approach to school discipline, particularly his ban on corporal punishment of girls in the school. RF Mackenzie wrote his own story of the events at Summerhill Academy, which led to his dismissal as headteacher. The 'Unbowed Head', gives a remarkable insight into staff, pupils, administrators and politicians at that time.

- The Unbowed Head, published in 1976 - foreword by Harry Reid
