= Summerhill (book) =

Book by A. S. Neill

Summerhill: A Radical Approach to Child Rearing
- Original cover
- Author: A. S. Neill
- Published: 1960 (Hart Publishing Company)
- Media type: Print
- Pages: 392
- Dewey Decimal: 372.94264
- LC Class: LF795.L692953 N4

Summerhill: A Radical Approach to Child Rearing is a book about the English boarding school Summerhill School by its headmaster A. S. Neill. It is known for introducing his ideas to the American public. It was published in America on November 7, 1960, by the Hart Publishing Company and later revised as Summerhill School: A New View of Childhood in 1993. Its contents are a repackaged collection from four of Neill's previous works. The foreword was written by psychoanalyst Erich Fromm, who distinguished between authoritarian coercion and Summerhill.

The seven chapters of the book cover the origins and implementation of the school, and other topics in childrearing. Summerhill, founded in the 1920s, is run as a children's democracy under Neill's educational philosophy of self-regulation, where kids choose whether to go to lessons and how they want to live freely without imposing on others. The school makes its rules at a weekly schoolwide meeting where students and teachers each have one vote alike. Neill discarded other pedagogies for one based on the innate goodness of the child.

Despite selling no advance copies in America, Summerhill brought Neill significant renown in the next decade, wherein he sold three million copies. The book was used in hundreds of college courses and translated into languages such as German. Reviewers noted Neill's charismatic personality, but doubted the project's general replicability elsewhere and its overstated generalizations. They put Neill in a lineage of experimental thought, but questioned his lasting contribution to psychology. The book begat an American Summerhillian following, cornered an education criticism market, and made Neill into a folk leader.

== Background ==
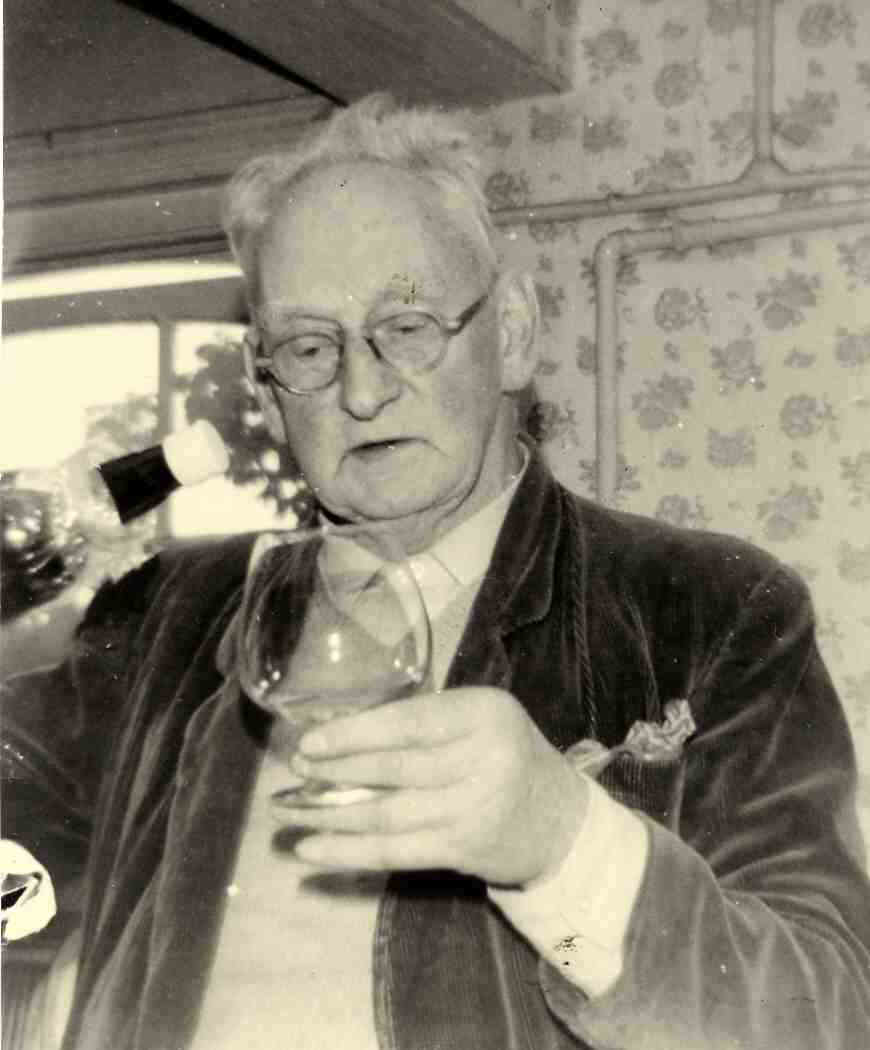
A. S. Neill

Summerhill: A Radical Approach to Child Rearing was written by A. S. Neill and published by Hart Publishing Company in 1960. In a letter to Neill, New York publisher Harold Hart suggested a book specific for America devised of parts from four of Neill's previous works: The Problem Child, The Problem Parent, The Free Child, and That Dreadful School. Neill liked his idea and gave the publisher wide liberties in the manuscript's preparation, preferring to write a preface or appendix in reflection on the writings. In re-reading his work, he realized he disagreed with his earlier statements on Freudian child analysis. Neill later regretted the liberties he had afforded the publisher, particularly the removal of Wilheim Reich's name from the book and index, since Neill saw Reich as an influential figure. They also struggled over copyright issues. Neill did not contest his disagreements, as he was eager to see the book published.

The publisher and Neill disagreed over the choice of writer for the book's foreword. Seeing forewords as more of an American tradition, Neill preferred not to have one, but suggested Henry Miller, an American author who had recently written Neill a fan letter and whose Tropic series was banned in the United States. Hart didn't think Miller's introduction would help the book and approached Margaret Mead, who refused on the grounds of Neill's connection with Reich. Several months later, psychoanalyst and sociologist Erich Fromm agreed to the project, and found consensus with Neill and the publisher. Fromm's introduction placed Summerhill in a history of backlash against progressive education and claimed that the "perverted" implementation of child freedom was more at fault than the idea of child freedom itself. He wrote that Summerhill was one of few schools that provided education without fear or hidden coercion, and that it carried the goals of "the Western humanistic tradition": "reason, love, integrity, and courage". Fromm also highlighted adult confusion about non-authoritarianism and how parents and teachers mistook coercion for genuine freedom.

In 1993 St. Martin's Press released a revised edition (edited by Albert Lamb) as Summerhill School: A New View of Childhood

== Summary ==
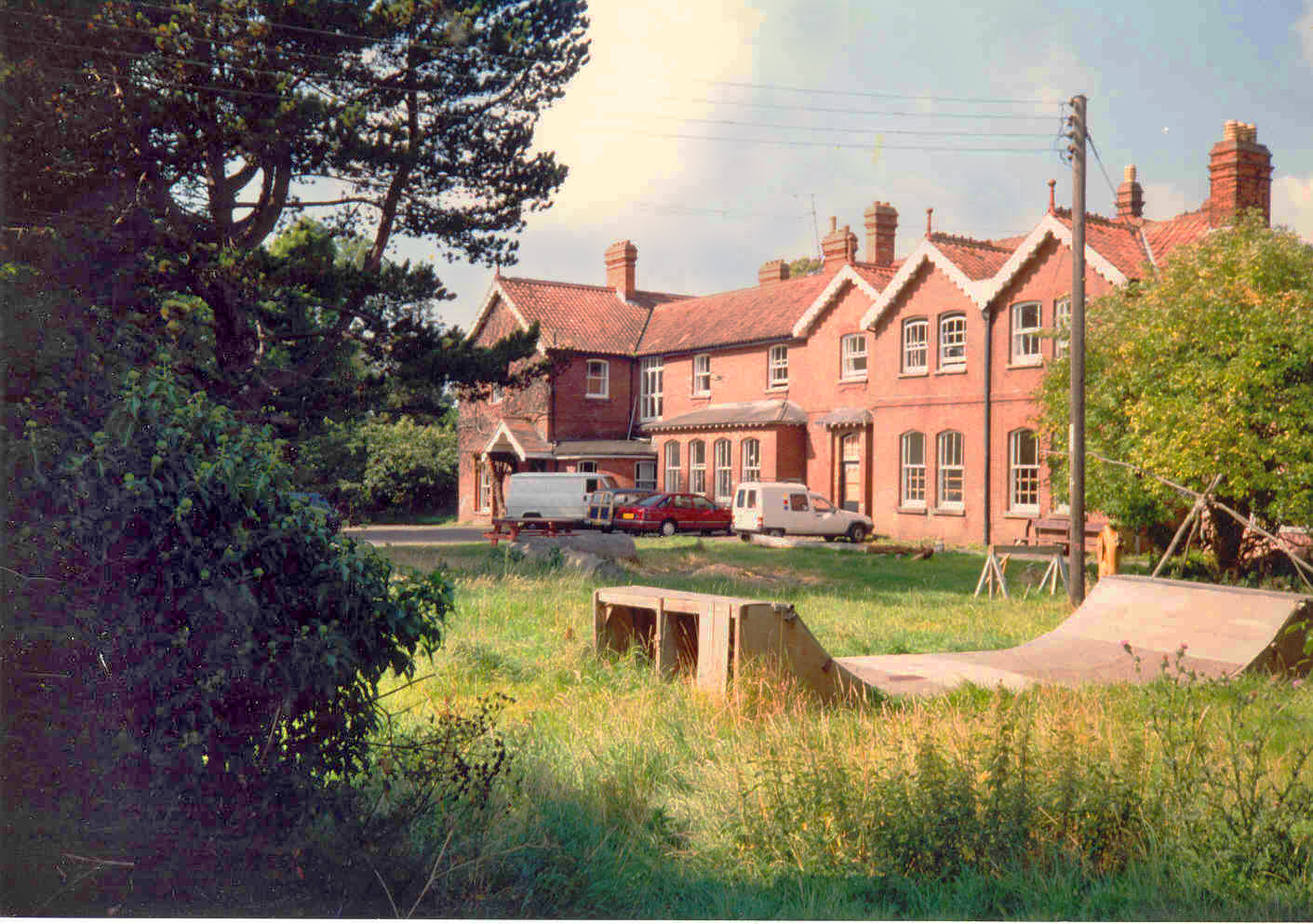
Summerhill School, 1993

Summerhill is A. S. Neill's "aphoristic and anecdotal" account of his "famous" "early progressive school experiment in England" founded in the 1920s, Summerhill School. The book's intent is to demonstrate the origins and effects of unhappiness, and then show how to raise children to avoid this unhappiness. It is an "affirmation of the goodness of the child". Summerhill is the story of Summerhill School's origins, its programs and pupils, how they live and are affected by the program, and Neill's own educational philosophy. It is split into seven chapters that introduce the school and discuss parenting, sex, morality and religion, "children's problems", "parents' problems", and "questions and answers".

The school is run as a democracy, with students deciding affairs that range from the curriculum to the behavior code. Lessons are non-compulsory. Neill emphasizes "self-regulation", personal responsibility, freedom from fear, "freedom in sex play", and loving understanding over moral instruction or force. In his philosophy, all attempts to mold children are coercive in nature and therefore harmful. Caretakers are advised to "trust" in the natural process and let children self-regulate such that they live by their own rules and consequently treat with the highest respect the rights of others to live by their own rules. Neill's "self-regulation" constitutes a child's right to "live freely, without outside authority in things psychic and somatic"—that children eat and come of age when they want, are never hit, and are "always loved and protected". Children can do as they please until their actions affect others. In an example, a student can skip French class to play music, but cannot disruptively play music during the French class. Against the popular image of "go as you please schools", Summerhill has many rules. However, they are decided at a schoolwide meeting where students and teachers each have one vote apiece. This does not necessarily mean total cessation to the children, as Neill thought adults were right to bemoan child destruction of property. He considered this tension between adult and child living styles to be natural. Neill felt that most schoolwork and books kept children from their right to play, and that learning should only follow play and not be mixed "to make [work] palatable". Neill found that those students interested in college would complete the prerequisites in two years and of their own volition.

The 45-person coeducational school with pupils aged five to fifteen is presented as successful and having reformed "problem children" into "successful human beings". Some became professionals and academics. In Summerhill, Neill blames many of society's problems on the "miseducation in conventional schools". He felt that society's institutions prevented "real freedom in individuals". Thus, Summerhill was created as a place for children to be free to be themselves. Neill discarded many kinds of dogma ("discipline, ... direction, ... suggestion, ... moral training, .. religious instruction") and put sole faith in the belief of the innate goodness of children.

== Reception ==
In 25 years of reading and reviewing books on education, I have yet to find one as stimulating, exciting, and challenging as the story of Summerhill. I commend this book to all educators who are interested in children.

— New York Times education journalist Benjamin Fine

The book debuted in America on November 7, 1960 during the week of John F. Kennedy's election. At the time of the book's release, Neill was unknown in the United States, and not a single bookseller purchased an advance copy. Summerhill brought him international renown over the next decade. The book sold 24,000 copies in its first year, 100 thousand in 1968, 200 thousand in 1969, two million total by 1970, and three million by 1973. Summerhill was included in over 600 American university courses, and a 1969 translation for West Germany (The Theory and Practice of Anti-Authoritarian Education) sold over a million copies in three years. In the wake of the book's success, publisher Harold Hart started the American Summerhill Society in New York City, of which Paul Goodman was a founding member.

Multiple reviewers stressed the school's reliance on Neill as a charismatic figure, which begat doubts of the institution's general replicability. Sarah Crutis (The Times Literary Supplement) asked whether teachers would have the "time, patience, and personality" to use Neill's methods. "Their extremes of endurance may sometimes sound masochistic", wrote D. W. Harding (New Statesman), and Richard E. Gross (The Social Studies) added that Neill's "extremes ... go far beyond good sense". Danica Deutsch (Journal of Individual Psychology) concluded that the school's lessons curbed the child's sense of social responsibility and other society-preserving functions. Jacob Hechler (Child Welfare) said that what Neill described as love—a combination of "caring and noninterference"—was very hard to bring to bear. The New Yorker called Neill "a fiery crusader" with "deep understanding of children", and Morris Fritz Mayer (Social Service Review) read Neill as having the "wrath and eloquence of a biblical prophet" with a belief in children and "unyielding attack against pathological and phony values in education" that "one cannot help admiring". Willard W. Hartup (Contemporary Psychology) positioned Neill as closer to a psychotherapist than a teacher, especially as the philosophy undergirding Summerhill "derives from Freud". Gene Phillips (The Annals of the American Academy) described Neill as the "essential ingredient of the democratic ethic that ... America needs".

Margaret Mead (American Sociological Review) considered the book more of a historical document for later generations to analyze "than anything that can be taken at its face value". She wrote the school to be "unique" and "counter-pointed to the emphases and excesses" of its era, which she credited to Neill's "rare charismatic personality". To Mead, Summerhill's moral battles had passed since the 1920s, as Neill's audience already agreed with his views on frank discussions about sex and the primacy of student interest. She added that his contemporaries had moved on to "rebelling against a contentless freedom" that prioritized emotional education over intellectual lessons. Similarly, Crutis (The Times Literary Supplement) noted Neill's approach as less "sensational" in its method than expected, and asserted that 1960s psychologists would agree with the stance to not guilt children for masturbating and to tell the truth about the origin of babies. Morton Reisman (The Phi Delta Kappan) upheld the book's subtitle and agreed that the book was "radical" in comparison to conventional American morality and education.

Multiple reviewers noted points of overgeneralization in the book. Crutis continued that criticism of individual aspects of the school, such as its stance against uniform curriculum, was justified. R. G. G. Price (Punch) remarked that the school was presented as having little intellectual or aesthetic zeal, and that Neill's statement against teaching algebra to eventual repairmen was "the most shameful sentence ever written by an educational pioneer". Hartup (Contemporary Psychology) and Harding (New Statesman) saw no evidence towards whether Summerhill students were successful by standards other than Neill's, particularly in academic distinction. The Saturday Review quoted from the British Inspectors report that the school was "unimpressive"—despite laudatory student "will and ... interest, ... their achievements are rather meager." Mead presaged that Summerhill could create "uncritical behavior" among parents unfamiliar with the pedagogical field, and that the book's "essential positive contribution", belief in child self-regulation, could be forgotten within the book's radicalism.

John Vaizey (The Spectator) spotlighted the book's emphasis on "the innate goodness of children" and how the progressive school movement's emphasis on freedom had spread into the public schools. Vaizey put Neill's Summerhill in a disappearing lineage of post-World War I experimental schools that focused on freedom from directed games, classics curriculum, and prudery. He wrote in 1962 that "Summerhill is clearly one of England's greatest schools" and that the decline of this experimental school tradition was a tragedy. Still, Deutsch (Journal of Individual Psychology) wrote that Summerhill had not been "duplicated" in the four decades since its creation. The Booklist noted Neill's "scant credit" awarded to prior progressive and experimental schools, and added that the addition of a British inspection report added objective credibility to the book. Hartup (Contemporary Psychology) described Neill's style as "bewitchingly direct, even epigrammatic" though also "patchy", leaving many discussions incomplete.

Each reader must decide for himself just how much of this is profound truth and how much is sentimental nonsense—philosophers, psychologists, and psychiatrists have long disagreed among themselves and there are no "authoritative" answers.

— Saturday Review book review, 1961

Reviewers described the book as both convincing and not. The New Yorker wrote that skeptical readers would find the book convincing. Crutis (The Times Literary Supplement) thought the book would lead readers to ask why "the principles of progressive education" were not more accepted in England. Reisman (The Phi Delta Kappan) wrote that even the sections dedicated to the origins of neuroses were "still noteworthy, challenging, and provocative". He wrote that the book's impact is in its "realistic demonstration of how children can be helped to become happy people" without guilt, hate, and fear. On the other hand, the Saturday Review doubted children wanted or benefitted from lack of adult authority. Hartup (Contemporary Psychology) thought that the book, while stimulating, left questions as to its actual contribution past an "experiment in applied psychoanalysis", with "clinical procedure ... alternatively inspired, naive, and hair-raising". He called Neill "an excellent devil's advocate for educators" but unhelpful in resolving the ailments of mass education.

Harry Elmer Barnes called the book one of the most exciting and challenging in the field of education since Émile. (This said, Hartup of Contemporary Psychology said Summerhill was closer to Freud's Three Essays on the Theory of Sexuality than to Émile and criticized Neill's psychoanalytic overemphases.) The psychoanalyst Benjamin Wolstein put Neill's work alongside that of John Dewey, and Sir Herbert Read likened Neill to Johann Heinrich Pestalozzi and Henry Caldwell Cook. David Carr characterized the book as centered on moral education, despite Neill's recurrent insistence on the danger of moral teachings. Scholar Richard Bailey agreed with Carr's characterization.

== Legacy ==
Richard Bailey wrote that the book "marked the birth of an American cult" with Neill and Summerhill at its center as Americans began to emulate the school and form support institutions. Bailey added that Summerhill's style was accessible and humorous compared to the era's moralizing literature, and unpretentious and simple compared to Deweyan thought. The book cornered an education criticism market, and made Neill into a "reluctant" folk leader. Timothy Gray wrote that the book aroused an education reform movement with directives advocated by Herb Kohl, Jonathan Kozol, Neil Postman, and Ivan Illich. Fifty years after the book was first released, Astra Taylor wrote that the idea of Summerhill selling millions of copies in the 2012 American education climate "seems absurd".
