= Little Commonwealth =

School in Dorset, 1910s

The Little Commonwealth was a school run by Homer Lane in Dorset during the 1910s known for its permissive libertarian approach to education.

== Bibliography ==
- Bazeley, Elsie Theodora (1948). Homer Lane and the Little Commonwealth (2nd ed.). London: George Allen & Unwin. OCLC 6361.
  - Kleinbard, Peter; Manley, John L. (April 1970). "Rev. of Talks to Parents and Teachers by Homer Lane; Homer Lane and the Little Commonwealth by E. T. Bazeley". Harvard Educational Review. 40 (1): 153–158. doi:10.17763/haer.40.1.w605r70340107502. ISSN 0017-8055.
  - Nichol, Lois (November 1970). "Reviewed Works: Talks to Parents and Teachers by Homer Lane; Homer Lane and the Little Commonwealth by E. T. Bazeley". Elementary English. 47 (7): 1010–1011. ISSN 0013-5968. JSTOR 41387736.
  - Shaw, Robert. "'Homer Lane and the Little Commonwealth' by Elsie Bazeley - The therapeutic care journal published by The National Centre for Therapeutic Residential and Foster Care". The Therapeutic Care Journal.
- Brehony, Kevin J. (2008). "The genesis and disappearance of Homer Lane's Little Commonwealth: A Weberian analysis". In Göhlich, Michael; Hopf, Caroline; Tröhler, Daniel (eds.). Persistenz und Verschwinden. Persistence and Disappearance. VS Verlag für Sozialwissenschaften. pp. 237–253. doi:10.1007/978-3-531-91125-0_18. ISBN 978-3-531-15977-5.
- Shotton, John (1993). "Free to Work or Loaf: The Little Commonwealth (Flowers Farm, Evershot, Dorset, 1913–1918)". No Master High or Low: Libertarian Education and Schooling in Britain 1890-1990. Bristol: Libertarian Education. pp. 135–137. ISBN 978-0-9513997-3-6.
