= Passive learning =

Learning method

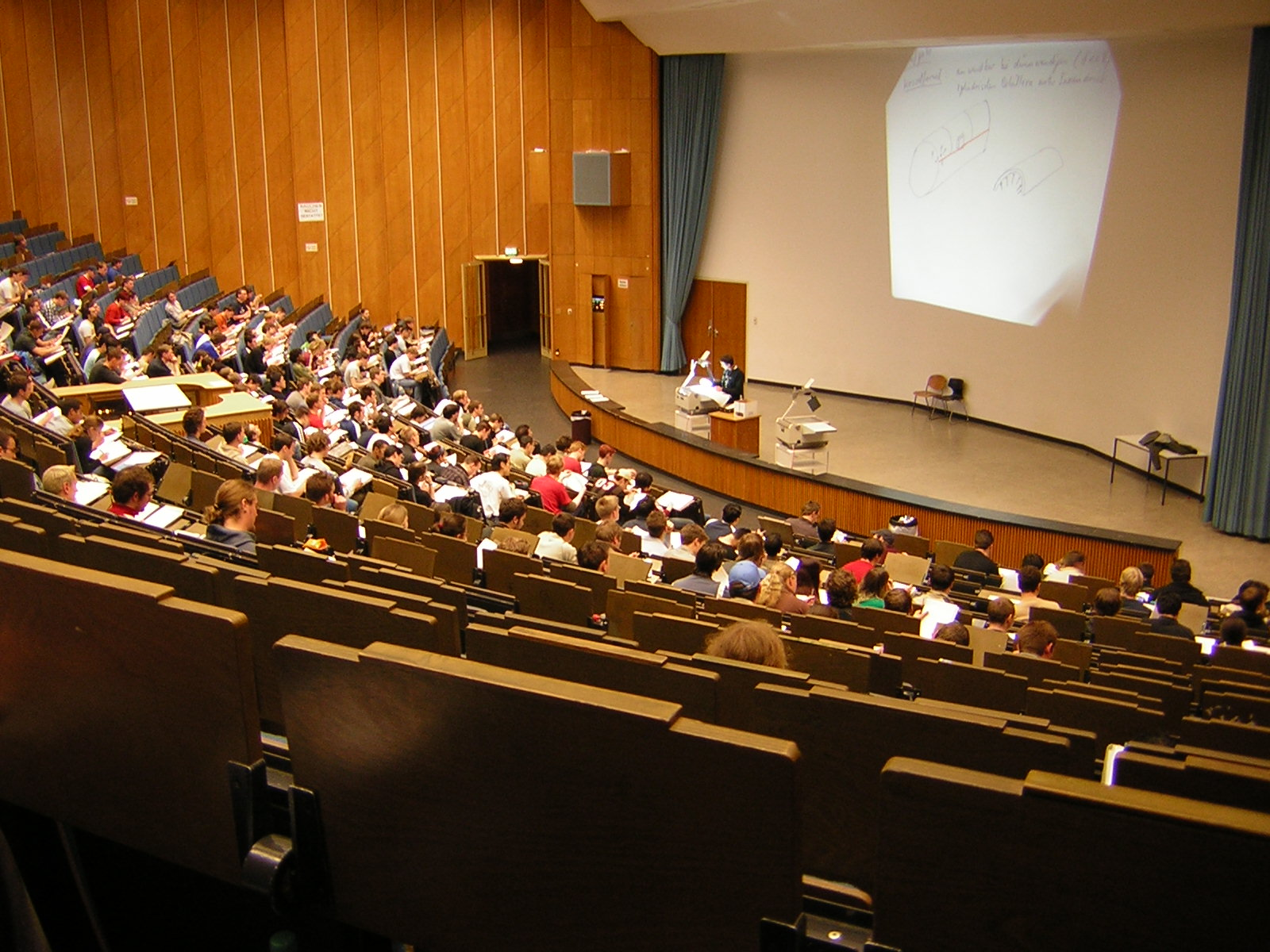
University lecture hall in Aachen

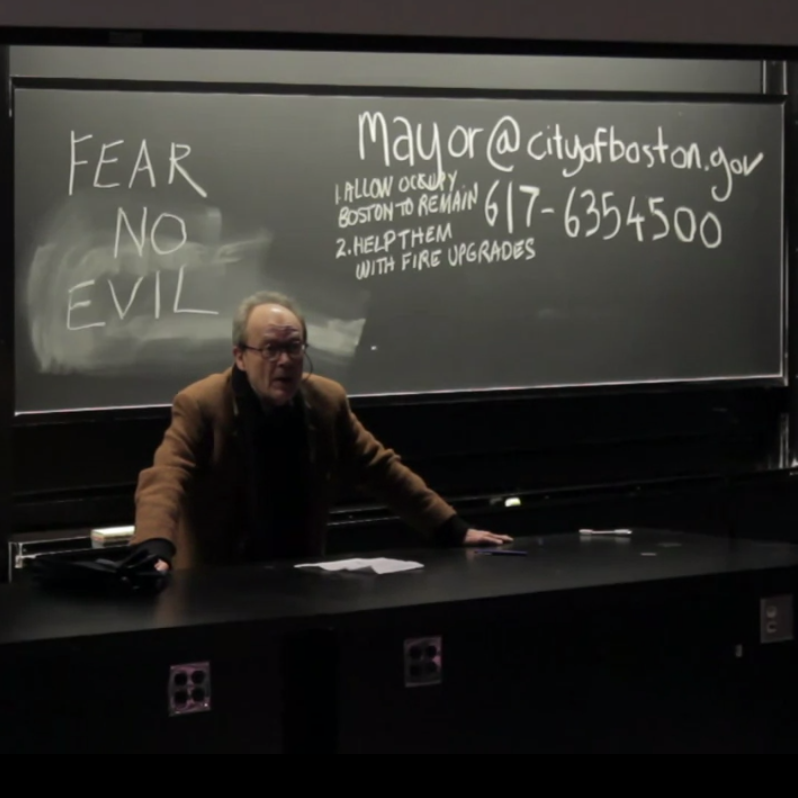
Lecture at Harvard University

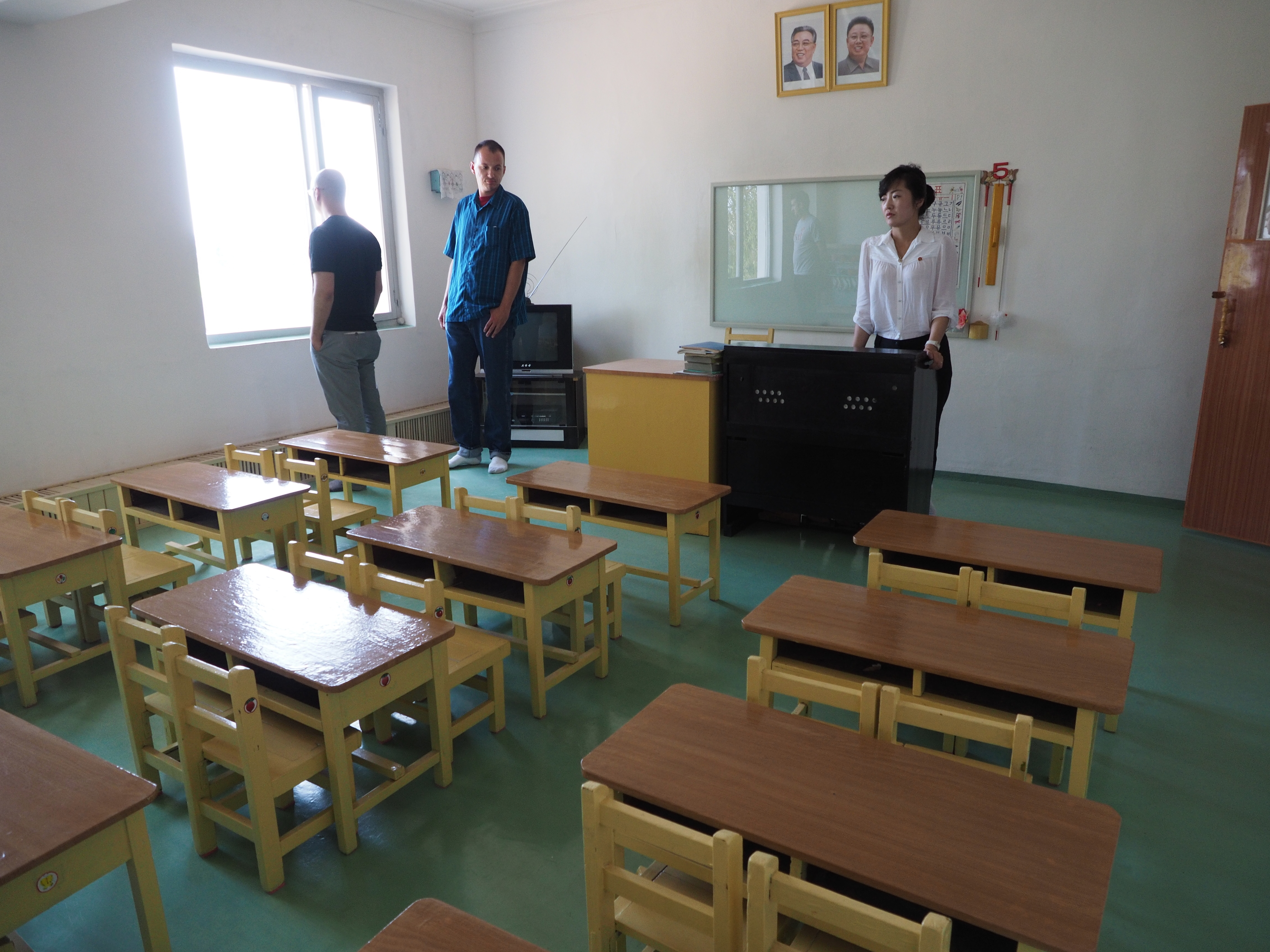
Classroom on a cooperative farm in North Korea configured for passive learning

Passive learning is a teaching method where students receive information from the instructor and internalize it. It is a method "where the learner receives no feedback from the instructor". The term is often used together with direct instruction and lecturing, with passive learning being the result or intended outcome of the instruction. This style of learning is teacher-centered and contrasts to active learning, which is student-centered, whereby students take an active or participatory role in the learning process, and to the Socratic method where students and instructors engage in cooperative argumentative dialogue. Passive learning is a traditional method utilized in factory model schools and modern schools, as well as historic and contemporary religious services in churches (sermons), mosques, and synagogues.

Passive learning is not simply the outcome of an educational model. Passive learners may quietly absorb information and knowledge without typically engaging with the information received or the learning experience. They may not interact with others, share insights, or contribute to a dialogue. An estimated 60 percent of people are passive learners.

== Passive vs. active learning ==
The effectiveness of traditional instruction and passive learning methods have been under debate for some time. The modern origins of progressive education, with active learning as a component, can be traced back to the 18th-century works of John Locke and Jean-Jacques Rousseau, both of whom are known as forerunners of ideas that would be developed by 20th-century theorists such as John Dewey. Locke wrote that "truth and knowledge… arise out of observation and experience rather than manipulation of accepted or given ideas".

=== Advantages ===
Advantages of passive learning include:

- Exposure to new material.
- Greater control by the instructor over the classroom, audience, or students.
- Opportunity for a structured and engaging format.
- Ensuring a complement to the subject matter outside of the learning environment and learning space.
- The ability to clarify course material.
- Presentation of a large amount of information in a short time.
- Instructional materials (lecture notes, handouts, audiovisual media, etc.) can be prepared in advance.
- Important concepts and content can be identified and presented in an organized, structured, and meaningful manner.
- The potential to facilitate large-class communication. This format can also permit dissemination of materials not yet published or readily available.

A randomized, controlled trial comparing passive (60-minute lecture) and active (30-minute lecture along with interactions between student pairs) showed no differences between the two methods in students' knowledge or attitudes. However, the perception of engagement with the delivered content was lower for the passive learning group.

=== Disadvantages ===
Disadvantages of passive learning include:

- The required assumption that for learning to be successful, the students will receive the subject matter with "open minds, like empty vessels or sponges".
- The instructor will fill the minds of the students with knowledge in order to obtain better examination results.
- Allows limited opportunities to assess how well students are learning content, ask questions, seek clarification, or participate in discussions.
- Students may be reticent about letting instructors know they do not understand key information and they may be reluctant to ask questions in class.
- With no opportunity for application, it does not consistently engage students' use of higher-level cognitive skills.
- A standard model is lecture-format with one-way communication which does not engage the listener.
- It requires the instructor to have effective speaking and presentation skills.
- It fails to support neuroinclusion – i.e., it accommodates some learning styles more than others.
- Students are expected to wait for information to be provided and then to follow directions on what to do with that information.
- Emphasis is placed on repeating information without reflecting or demonstrating an understanding. This can result in surface processing instead of deeper learning, less ability to use what is learned, and the study being deemed irrelevant by the students.

The disadvantages of passive learning can be compared to the advantages of active learning. It has been suggested that while active engagement with material, students, instructors, etc. might be critical to learning, active participation may not be.
