= Interdisciplinary teaching =

Methods used to teach across curricular disciplines

Interdisciplinary teaching is a method, or set of methods, used to teach across curricular disciplines or "the bringing together of separate disciplines around common themes, issues, or problems.” Often interdisciplinary instruction is associated with or a component of several other instructional approaches. For example, in a review of literature on the subject published in 1994, Kathy Lake identified seven elements common to integrated curriculum models: a combination of subjects; an emphasis on projects; the use of a wide variety of source material, not just textbooks; highlighting relationships among concepts; thematic units; flexible schedules; and flexible student grouping.

== Types ==
There are many different types, or levels, of interdisciplinary teaching. On one end, schools might employ an interdisciplinary team approach, in which teachers of different content areas assigned to one group of students who are encouraged to correlate some of their teaching. The most common method of implementing integrated, interdisciplinary instruction is the thematic unit, in which a common theme is studied in more than one content area.

The example given above about rivers would be considered multidisciplinary or parallel design, which is defined as lessons or units developed across many disciplines with a common organizing topic.

One of the foremost scholars of interdisciplinary teaching techniques is James Beane, who advocates for curriculum integration, which is curriculum that is collaboratively designed around important issues. It has four major components: the integration of experiences, social integration, the integration of knowledge, and integration as a curriculum design. It differs from other types of interdisciplinary teaching in that it begins with a central theme that emerges from questions or social concerns students have, without regard to subject delineations.

In 1989, the seminal work, Interdisciplinary Curriculum: Design and Implementation, edited by Heidi Hayes Jacobs was published by ASCD (Alexandria, Va). In this work, she presented a continuum of options for design spanning focused disciplined work to parallel to multidisciplinary to full integration.

=== Examples ===
- Travel and vacation can serve as a theme for cross-curricular interdisciplinary instruction. In social studies, student might study the geography of popular travel destinations, the history of tourist sites in the local community, and how travel changed dramatically during the 19th century Industrial Revolution. Analysis of travel promotion and advertising are relevant to media literacy education. Thousands of travel accounts have been published over the centuries that could be read and discussed in English classes. The impact of tourism on the environment relevant to science curriculum. In business education, students might examine the impact of tourism on the local, regional, or world economy.
- An interdisciplinary unit on rivers is appropriate for elementary or middle school Language Arts, Science and Social Studies. The local river system would be the unifying idea, but the English teacher would link it to Language Arts by studying river vocabulary and teaching students how to do a research report. The science teacher might teach children about the life systems that exist in the river, while the Social Studies teacher might help students research the local history and peoples who used the river for food and transport.
- Food is studied in every discipline and can serve as a theme for interdisciplinary instruction. Psychologists and sociologists explore how individuals and cultures decide what to eat, how to prepare it, and how to consume it. Anthropologists explore the meaning and symbolism of food in a culture or how food relates to social class, sex, gender, or ethnicity. Economists study the production, distribution, marketing, sales, trade, and prices of food. Political scientists examine the government food policies such as taxation, regulation and debate the government’s role in feeding its citizens. Scientists from the fields of nutrition, medicine, chemistry, biology, and agriculture study every aspect of food, from diet, health, and nutrition to chemical composition, production, and preservation. Food historians use interdisciplinary approaches to study food and its place in social class, religious practice, immigration, urbanization, technological change, the growth of the food industry, counterculture movements, and government policy.

== Implementation ==
Heidi Hayes Jacobs presents a four-phase approach to curriculum integration planning. First, she suggests that a school conduct action research to learn more about how to implement curriculum integration. This should be done six months to a year ahead of when the school is going to attempt curriculum integration. Next, phase two calls for the development of a proposal. Phase three consists of implementing and monitoring the pilot unit; this should take place in the second year of the curriculum integration plan. Phase four takes place in the third year of the plan, and calls for staff adoption of the program based on the findings from phase three.

Choosing a theme to focus interdisciplinary instruction is a key step in implementing this approach. Themes should be of interest to students and relevant to the required curriculum. In some situations, students might choose the thematic topic. Themes should also be topics of interest to the teacher(s) because successful thematic instructions often requires additional research and preparation. Interdisciplinary themes related to multiple academic disciplines can be reinforced in lessons throughout the school day.

Essential questions are helpful in focusing the theme of interdisciplinary curriculum units. Essential questions are open-ended, intellectually engaging questions that demand higher-order thinking. Essential questions help teachers chose the most important facts and concepts relative to the theme and serve to focus planning efforts. For students, essential questions highlight key facts and concepts related to the interdisciplinary theme. They also serve as a focus for analysis and evaluation. Good essential questions can not be answered with a simple yes/no or true/false; students must discuss, defend, and debate issues related to the theme. Designing interdisciplinary instruction around essential questions require students to learn both content and develop critical analysis skills.

== Benefits ==
A school district in Michigan created integration plans for thematic units, based on the ideas of Howard Gardner about multiple intelligences, in a yearlong pilot program. The results of the program included “sustained enthusiasm” from the staff, parents, and students, increased attendance rates, and improvement in standardized test scores, “especially from students with the poorest test results”.

Flowers, Mertens, & Mulhall identify five important outcomes and findings of their experiences with interdisciplinary teaching and planning: common planning time is vital, schools that team have a more positive work climate, parental contact is more frequent, teachers report a higher job satisfaction, and student achievement scores in schools that team are higher than those that do not team.

Additionally, Pumerantz & Galanto find that interdisciplinary teaching allows for students to, “Proceed at a pace commensurate with their interests, skills, and experiences”.

Integrated instruction helps teachers better utilize instructional time and look deeper into subjects through a variety of content-specific lens. Another benefit of integrated instruction is that teachers can better differentiate instruction to individual student needs. Integrated instruction also allows for authentic assessment. A final benefit of interdisciplinary teaching is that students have a chance to work with multiple sources of information, thus ensuring they are receiving a more inclusive perspective than they would from consulting one textbook.

== Criticism ==
Scholars that advocate for curriculum integration argue that the topics studied should originate with students and their teachers, and not from district-imposed curriculum packages. This raises the important issue of accountability. As school districts often have decision-making panels that consist of stakeholders such as teachers, parents, and students, curriculum integration may take away their agency to make curricular choices. In addition to issues of local control, truly integrated curricula may or may not prepare students for the high-stakes tests that have become a reality for most high schools around the world, depending on whether they cover the same material. Finally, there is also concern that integrated teaching discounts the value of deep subject-specific knowledge, which is essential for specialization in areas such as medicine, law, and engineering.

Thematic units can also fall short of teaching in-depth content to students. Often a theme, such as apples, is used to link unrelated subjects, with little deference to students’ prior knowledge or interests. This superficial coverage of a topic can give students the wrong idea about school, perhaps missing the idea of curriculum integration in the first place. Thematic units can contain pointless busywork and activities created solely to create a link to a theme; for example, the alphabetizing of state capitals in a social studies unit, attempting to integrate it with language arts.

Research has also suggested that some students may have less capacity to cope with broad interdicisplinary curricula that spans diverse combination of subjects from different fields.

== See also ==
- Interdisciplinarity
- Phenomenon-based learning
- Thematic learning
