= Phenomenon-based learning =

Learner centric pedagogy

Phenomenon-based learning is a constructivist form of learning or pedagogy, where students study a topic or concept in a holistic approach instead of in a subject-based approach. Phenomenon-based learning includes both topical learning (also known as topic-based learning or instruction), where the phenomenon studied is a specific topic, event, or fact, and thematic learning (also known as theme-based learning or instruction), where the phenomenon studied is a concept or idea. Phenomenon-based learning emerged as a response to the idea that traditional, subject-based learning is outdated and removed from the real-world and does not offer the optimum approach to development of 21st century skills. It has been used in a wide variety of higher educational institutions and more recently in grade schools.

== Features ==
PhBL forges connections across content and subject areas within the limits of the particular focus. It can be a used as part of teacher-centered passive learning although in practice it is used more in student-centered active learning environments, including inquiry-based learning, problem-based learning, or project-based learning. An example of topical learning might be studying a phenomenon or topic (such as a geographical feature, historical event, or notable person) instead of isolated subjects (such as geography, history, or literature). In the traditional subject-based approach of most Western learning environments, the learner would spend a set amount of time studying each subject; with topical learning, the trend is to spend a greater amount of time focused on the broader topic. During this topical study, specific knowledge or information from the individual subjects would normally be introduced in a relevant context instead of in isolation or the abstract.

Topical learning is most frequently applied as a learner-centered approach, where the student, not the teacher, selects the topic or phenomenon to be studied. This is thought to be more successful at engaging students and providing deeper learning as it will be more likely to align with their own interests and goals. This aspect has also been recognized as facilitating the integration of education as well as a method to enable students to obtain core knowledge and skills across a range of subjects, it has been considered effective in promoting enthusiasm and greater organization, communication, and evaluation.

Similar to project-based learning, it also provides opportunities to explore a topic or concept in detail. With deeper knowledge students develop their own ideas, awareness, and emotions about the topic.

While not absolute, PhBL has several main features:

=== Inquiry-based ===
The PhBL approach supports learning in accordance with inquiry learning, problem-based learning, and project and portfolio learning in formal educational as well as in the workplace. It begins with studying and developing an understanding of the phenomenon through inquiry. A problem-based learning approach can then be used to discover answers and develop conclusions about the topic.

=== Anchored in the real world ===
The phenomenon-based approach is a form of anchored learning, although it is not necessarily linked to technology. The questions asked and items studied are anchored in real-world phenomena, and the skills that are developed and information learned can be applied across disciplines and beyond the learning environments in real-world situations. Real-world phenomena can also be based on fictional narratives, for example a story, book or fictional character, but these are elements drawn from the real world.

=== Contextual ===
PhBL provides a process where new information is applied to the phenomenon or problem. This context demonstrates to the learner immediate utility value of the concepts and information being studied. Application and use of this information during the learning situation is very important for retention. Information that is absorbed only through listening or reading, or in the abstract (such as formulas and theories) without clear and obvious application to the learning at hand, or to real-world application, often remain in short-term memory and are not internalized.

=== Authenticity ===
PhBL can demonstrate the authenticity of learning, a key requirement for deeper learning. In a PhBL environment, cognitive processes correspond to those in the actual/real-world situations where the learned subject matter or skills are used. Manowaluilou et al. (2022) found that Project-Based Learning (PBL) can improve children's learning outcomes when authentic, real-world case-based phenomena are employed. This method promotes greater engagement and a deeper understanding of concepts among students. The intent is to bring genuine practices and processes into learning situations to allow participation in the "expert culture" of the area and practices being studied.

=== Constructivism ===
PhBL is a constructivist form of learning, in which learners are seen as active knowledge builders and information is seen as being constructed as a result of problem-solving. Information and skills are constructed out of ‘little pieces’ into a whole relevant to the situation at the time. When phenomenon based learning occurs in a collaborative setting (the learners work in teams, for example), it supports the socio-constructivist and sociocultural learning theories, in which information is not seen only as an internal element of an individual; instead, information is seen as being formed in a social context. Central issues in the sociocultural learning theories include cultural artifacts (e.g. systems of symbols such as language, mathematical calculation rules and different kinds of thinking tools) – not every learner needs to reinvent the wheel, they can use the information and tools transmitted by cultures.

== Topical learning ==
Topical learning (TL) has been used for decades to study a specific topic such as a geographical feature, historical event, legal case, medical condition, or notable person, each of which may cover more than one academic subject such as geography, history, law, or medicine. TL forges connections across content areas within the limits of the particular topic. As a cross-disciplinary application, it has been used as a means of assisting foreign language learners to use the topic as a means to learn the foreign language. There are several benefits of topic-based learning. When students focus on learning a topic, the specific subject, such as a foreign language, becomes an important tool or medium to understand the topic, thus providing a meaningful way for learners to use and learn the subject (or language).

== Thematic learning ==
Thematic learning is used to study a macro theme, such as a broad concept or large and integrated system (political system, ecosystem, growth, etc.). In the United States, it is used to study concepts identified in the Core Curriculum Content Standards. As with topical learning, it forges connections across content areas within the limits of the particular topic. Proponents state that by studying the broad concepts that connect what would otherwise be isolated subject areas, learners can develop skills and insights for future learning and the workplace.

== Finland ==
Commencing in the 2016–2017 academic year, Finland will begin implementing educational reform that will mandate that topical learning (phenomenon-based learning) be introduced alongside traditional subject-based instruction. As part of a new National Curriculum Framework, it will apply to all basic schools for students aged 7–16 years old. Finnish schools have used PhBL for several decades, but it was not previously mandatory. It is anticipated that educators around the world will be studying this development as Finland's educational system is considered to be a model of success by many. This shift coincides with other changes that are encouraging development of 21st century skills such as collaboration, communication, creativity, and critical thinking.
