= Learning environment =

Term in education

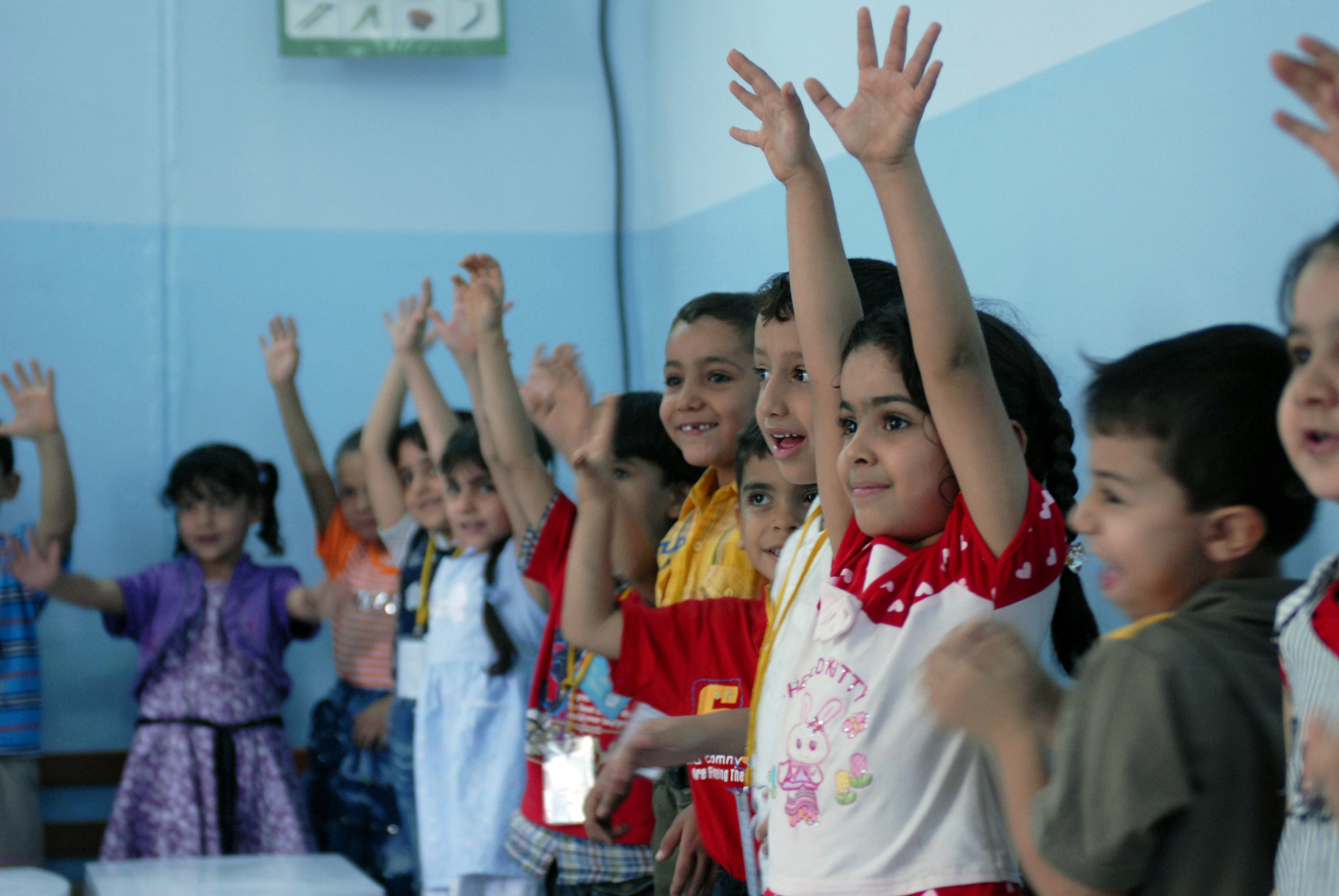
Learning environments are educational approaches, cultures, and physical settings for all types of learners and activities.

The term learning environment can refer to an educational approach, cultural context, or physical setting (the learning space) in which teaching and learning occur. The term is commonly used as a generalizing alternative to "classroom", but it typically refers to the context of educational philosophy or knowledge experienced by the student and may also encompass a variety of learning cultures—its presiding ethos and characteristics, how individuals interact, governing structures, and philosophy. In a societal sense, learning environment may refer to the culture of the population it serves and of their location.

Learning environments are highly diverse in use, learning styles, organization, and educational institution. The culture and context of a place or organization includes such factors as a way of thinking, behaving, or working, also known as organizational culture. For a learning environment such as an educational institution, it also includes such factors as operational characteristics of the instructors, instructional group, or institution; the philosophy or knowledge experienced by the student and may also encompass a variety of learning cultures—its presiding ethos and characteristics, how individuals interact, governing structures, and philosophy in learning styles and pedagogies used; and the societal culture of where the learning is occurring. Although physical environments do not determine educational activities, there is evidence of a relationship between school settings and the activities that take place there.

== History ==
The Japanese word for school, gakuen (がくえん、学園), means "learning garden" or "garden of learning". The word school derives from Greek σχολή (scholē), originally meaning "leisure" and also "that in which leisure is employed", but later "a group to whom lectures were given, school". Kindergarten is a German word whose literal meaning is "garden for the children", however, the term was coined in the metaphorical sense of "place where children can grow in a natural way".

Direct instruction is perhaps civilization's oldest method of formal, structured education and continues to be a dominant form throughout the world. In its essence, it involves the transfer of information from one who possesses more knowledge to one who has less knowledge, either in general or in relation to a particular subject or idea. The Socratic method was developed over two millennia ago in response to direct instruction in the scholae of Ancient Greece. Its dialectic, questioning form continues to be an important form of learning in western schools of law. Hands-on learning, a form of active and experiential learning, predates language and the ability to convey knowledge by means other than demonstration, has been shown to be one of the more effective means of learning and over the past two decades has been given an increasingly important role in education.

== Operational characteristics ==
The operation of the educational facility can have a determining role of the nature of the learning environment. Characteristics that can determine the nature of the learning environment include:

- Organization type: state or public school, independent school, parochial school;
- Structure: rigidly structured (military schools) to less structured (Sudbury school, Free school movement, Democratic education, Anarchistic free school, Modern Schools or Ferrer Schools;
- Non-institutional: homeschooling, unschooling;
- Schedule: the length and timing of the academic year (e.g. year-round schooling), class and activity schedules, length of the class period, block scheduling;
- Staffing: the number of teachers, student-teacher ratio, single-teacher per room or co-teaching;
- Attendance: compulsory student until a certain age or standard is achieved;
- Teacher certification: varying degrees of professional qualifications;
- Assessment: testing and standards provided by government directly or indirectly;
- Partnerships and mentoring: relationships between the learning environments and outside entities or individuals in general study or chosen fields;
- Organizational model: departmental, integrated, academy, small school.
- Curriculum: the subjects comprising a course of study.

== Societal culture ==
"Culture" is generally defined as the beliefs, customs, arts, traditions, and values of a society, group, place, or time. This may include a school, community, a nation, or a state. Culture affects the behavior of educators, students, staff, and community. It often determines curriculum content. A community's socioeconomic status directly influences its ability to support a learning institution; its ability to attract high caliber educators with appealing salaries; a safe, secure, and comfortable secure facility; and provide even basic needs for students, such as adequate nutrition, health care, adequate rest, and support at home for homework and obtaining adequate rest.

== Pedagogy and learning style ==
Several of the key trends in educational models throughout the 20th and early 21st century include progressive education, constructivist education, and 21st century skills-based education. These can be provided in comprehensive or specialized schools in a variety of organizational models, including departmental, integrative, project-based, academy, small learning communities, and school-within-a-school. Each of these can also be paired, at least in part, with design-based, virtual school, flipped classroom, and blended learning models.

=== Passive learning ===
Passive learning, a key feature of direct instruction, has at its core the dissemination of nearly all information and knowledge from a single source, the teacher with a textbook providing lessons in lecture-style format. This model has also become known as the "sage on the stage". A high degree of learning was by rote memorization. When public education began to proliferate in Europe and North America from the early 19th century, a direct-instruction model became the standard and has continued into the 21st century. Education at the time was designed to provide workers for the emerging factory-based, industrial societies, and this educational model and organization of schools became known as the "factory model school", with curriculum, teaching style, and assessment heavily standardized and centered around the needs and efficiencies of classroom and teacher management.

=== Active learning ===
Active learning is a model of instruction that focuses the responsibility of learning on learners, not on teacher-led instruction, a model also termed student-centered. It is based on the premise that in order to learn, students must do more than just listen: they must read, write, discuss, or be engaged in solving problems. It relates to three learning domains referred to as knowledge, skills and attitudes (KSA) (Bloom, 1956), whereby students must engage in such higher-order thinking tasks as analysis, synthesis, and evaluation. Active learning engages students in two aspects – doing things and thinking about the things they are doing (Bonwell and Eison, 1991). (See Bloom's taxonomy).

==== Differentiated learning ====
Differentiated learning has developed from an awareness of the effectiveness of different learning styles which have emerged from late 20th/early 21st century neurological research and studies of the different learning styles. As the impacts of the factory model school's design on learning became more apparent, together with the emerging need for different skills in the late 20th century, so too did the need for different educational styles and different configurations of the physical learning environments. Direct instruction is now expanding to include students conducting independent or guided research with multiple sources of information, greater in-class discussion, group collaboration, experiential (hands-on, project-based, etc.), and other forms of active learning. Direct instruction's "sage on the stage" role for teachers approach is being augmented or replaced by a "guide by the side" approach. In instruction based on differentiation, the classroom teacher alters the delivery and content of instruction for students based on each student's learning profile, readiness level, and interests

==== Progressive education ====
Progressive education is a pedagogical movement using many tenets of active learning that began in the late 19th century and has continued in various forms to the present. The term progressive was engaged to distinguish this education from the traditional Euro-American curricula of the 19th century, which was rooted in classical preparation for the university and strongly differentiated by social class. Progressive education is rooted in present experience. Many progressive education programs include qualities such as learning by doing (hands-on projects, experiential learning, integrated curriculum, integration of entrepreneurship, problem solving, critical thinking, group work, social skills development, goals of understanding and action instead of rote knowledge, collaborative and cooperative learning projects, education for social responsibility and democracy, personalized education, integration of community service, subject content selection based on what future skills will be needed, de-emphasis on textbooks, lifelong learning, and assessment by evaluation of students' projects and productions.

==== Constructivist education ====
Constructivist education is a movement includes active learning, discovery learning, and knowledge building, and all versions promote a student's free exploration within a given framework or structure. The teacher acts as a facilitator who encourages students to discover principles for themselves and to construct knowledge by working answering open-ended questions and solving real-world problems. Montessori education is an example of a constructivist learning approach.

=== 21st century learning ===
A 21st century learning environment is a learning program, strategy, and specific content. All are learner-centered and supported by or include the use of modern digital technologies. Many incorporate key components of active learning.

Blended learning is a learning program in which a student learns at least in part through delivery of content and instruction via digital and online media with greater student control over time, place, path, or pace than with traditional learning.

Personalized learning is an educational strategy that offers pedagogy, curriculum, and learning environments to meet the individual students' needs, learning preferences, and specific interests. It also encompasses differentiated instruction that supports student progress based on mastery of specific subjects or skills.

21st century skills are a series of higher-order skills, abilities, and learning dispositions that have been identified as being required content and outcomes for success in 21st century society and workplaces by educators, business leaders, academics, and governmental agencies. These skills include core subjects (The three Rs), 21st century content, collaboration, communication, creativity, critical thinking, information and communication technologies (ICT) literacy, life skills, and 21st century assessments.

Digital literacy is becoming critical to successful learning. Mobile and personal technology is transforming learning environments and workplaces. It allows learning - including research, collaboration, creating, writing, production, and presentation - to occur almost anywhere. Its tools support creativity of thought - through collaboration, generation, and production without requiring manual dexterity. It fosters personalization of learning spaces by teachers and students, which supports the learning activity directly and indirectly through providing a feeling of ownership and relevancy.

== Conducive classroom climates ==
A conducive classroom climate is one that is optimal for teaching and learning and where students feel safe and nurtured. Such classroom climate creations include:

- Modelling fairness and justice:

The tone set by the teacher plays an important role in establishing expectations about respectful behaviour in the classroom. A teacher who is calm, fair and transparent about expectations and conduct serves as a model for students. This includes establishing clear and appropriate consequences for breaking classroom and school rules, ensuring that they are just, proportional, and paired with positive reinforcement.

- Positive engagement opportunities for adolescents:

Adolescents bring creativity, enthusiasm and a strong sense of natural justice to their learning and play. Where learners are given meaningful opportunities to provide creative and constructive input into lesson planning and school governance processes, expected benefits include: increased engagement; the development of skills in planning, problem-solving, group work, and communication; and a sense of pride in school activities and their own learning experience. In addition, finding the right choice structure for student engagement ensures these benefits. Overly complex choices can result in negative or no outcome in learning.

- Thoughtful classroom set-up:

Physical classroom should be arranged so that students can work independently and easily arrange their desks for group work. For example, having an open space area conducive to teamwork. Teachers can also identify open areas outside of the classroom that could work for activities and group work (such as the schoolyard). In addition to open spaces, a quiet area where the teacher can speak directly to students one-to-one allows for debriefing of behavioural issues and for students to feel safe to discuss sensitive issues, away from the other students.

- Participatory teaching methods:

Teachers should adopt participatory teaching methods to allow students to benefit from active learning and practical activities. Using role-playing and the creative arts can assist students to understand and appreciate different experiences and points of view. These methods develop learning outcomes such as critical thinking and problem-solving skills.

== Organizational models ==
Learning environments are frequently organized into six pedagogical and physical models:

- Departmental model
- Integrative model
- Project based learning model
- Academy model
- School-within-a-school model
- Small learning communities model

== See also ==
- Cooperative education
- Cooperative learning
- Home schooling
- Learning space
- Phenomenon-based learning
- Practice-based professional learning
- Service-learning
- Thematic learning
- Work-based learning

== Sources ==
This article incorporates text from a free content work. Licensed under CC BY-SA 3.0 IGO. Text taken from Empowering students for just societies: a handbook for secondary school teachers, UNESCO, UNESCO. UNESCO.
