= Student-centered learning =

Methods of teaching

Student-centered learning, also known as learner-centered education, broadly encompasses methods of teaching that shift the focus of instruction from the teacher to the student. In original usage, student-centered learning aims to develop learner autonomy and independence by putting responsibility for the learning path in the hands of students by imparting to them skills, and the basis for how to learn a specific subject and schemata required to measure up to the specific performance requirement. Student-centered instruction focuses on skills and practices that enable lifelong learning and independent problem-solving. Student-centred learning theory and practice are based on the constructivist learning theory that emphasises the learner's critical role in constructing meaning from new information and prior experience.

Student-centered learning puts students' interests first, acknowledging student voice as central to the learning experience. In a student-centered learning space, students choose what they will learn, how they will pace their learning, and how they will assess their own learning by playing the role of the facilitator of the classroom. This is in contrast to traditional education, also dubbed "teacher-centered learning", which situates the teacher as the primarily "active" role while students take a more "passive", receptive role. In a teacher-centered classroom, teachers choose what the students will learn, how the students will learn, and how the students will be assessed on their learning. In contrast, student-centered learning requires students to be active, responsible participants in their own learning and at their own pace of learning.

Usage of the term "student-centered learning" may also simply refer to educational mindsets or instructional methods that recognize individual differences in learners. In this sense, student-centered learning emphasizes each student's interests, abilities, and learning styles, placing the teacher as a facilitator of learning for individuals rather than for the class as a whole.

== Background ==
Theorists like John Dewey, Jean Piaget and Lev Vygotsky, whose collective work focused on how students learn, have informed the move to student-centered learning. Dewey advocated progressive education and believed learning is a social, experiential process, making it an active process as children learn by doing. He believed that a classroom environment in which students could learn to think critically and solve real-world problems was the best way to prepare learners for the future.

Carl Rogers's ideas about the formation of the individual also contributed to student-centered learning. Rogers wrote that "the only learning which significantly influences behavior [and education] is self-discovered". Maria Montessori was also a forerunner of student-centred learning; in the early 20th century, she applied her child-centred methods, first developed through work with children with disabilities, in schools for young children.

Self-determination theory focuses on the degree to which an individual's behavior is self-motivated and 'self-determined'. When students can gauge their learning, learning becomes an incentive and therefore more meaningful. Placing students at the center of the classroom allows them to gauge their own self-worth, which creates a higher degree of intrinsic motivation.

Student-centered learning means inverting the traditional teacher-centered understanding of the learning process and putting students at the center of the learning process. In the teacher-centered classroom, teachers are the primary source of knowledge. On the other hand, in student-centered classrooms, active learning is strongly encouraged. Armstrong (2012) claimed that "traditional education ignores or suppresses learner responsibility".

A further distinction between a teacher-centered classroom and that of a student-centered classroom is when the teacher acts as a facilitator, as opposed to an instructor. In essence, the teacher's goal in the learning process is to guide students into making new interpretations of the learning material, thereby 'experiencing' content, reaffirming Rogers' notion that "significant learning is acquired through doing".

Through peer-to-peer interaction, collaborative thinking can lead to an abundance of knowledge. By placing a teacher closer to a peer level, knowledge and learning are enhanced, benefiting the student and classroom overall. According to Lev Vygotsky's theory of the zone of proximal development (ZPD), students typically learn vicariously through one another. Scaffolding is important when fostering independent thinking skills. Vygotsky proclaims, "Learning which is oriented toward developmental levels that have already been reached is ineffective from the viewpoint of the child's overall development. It does not aim for a new stage of the developmental process, but rather lags behind this process."

== Student-centered assessment ==
One of the most critical differences between student-centered learning and teacher-centered learning is in assessment. Student-centered learning typically involves more formative assessment and less summative assessment than teacher-centered learning. In student-centered learning, students participate in the evaluation of their learning. This means that students are involved in deciding how to demonstrate their learning. Developing assessment that supports learning and motivation is essential to the success of student-centered approaches.

== Application to elementary and secondary education ==
In the U.S., the principles of student-centered instruction have been promoted as a way to improve engagement and boost achievement through their inclusion in the Common Core. Student-centered instruction has been shown to be related to increased mathematics engagement. Additionally, there is evidence that using student-centered instruction raises mathematics achievement.

== Application to higher education ==
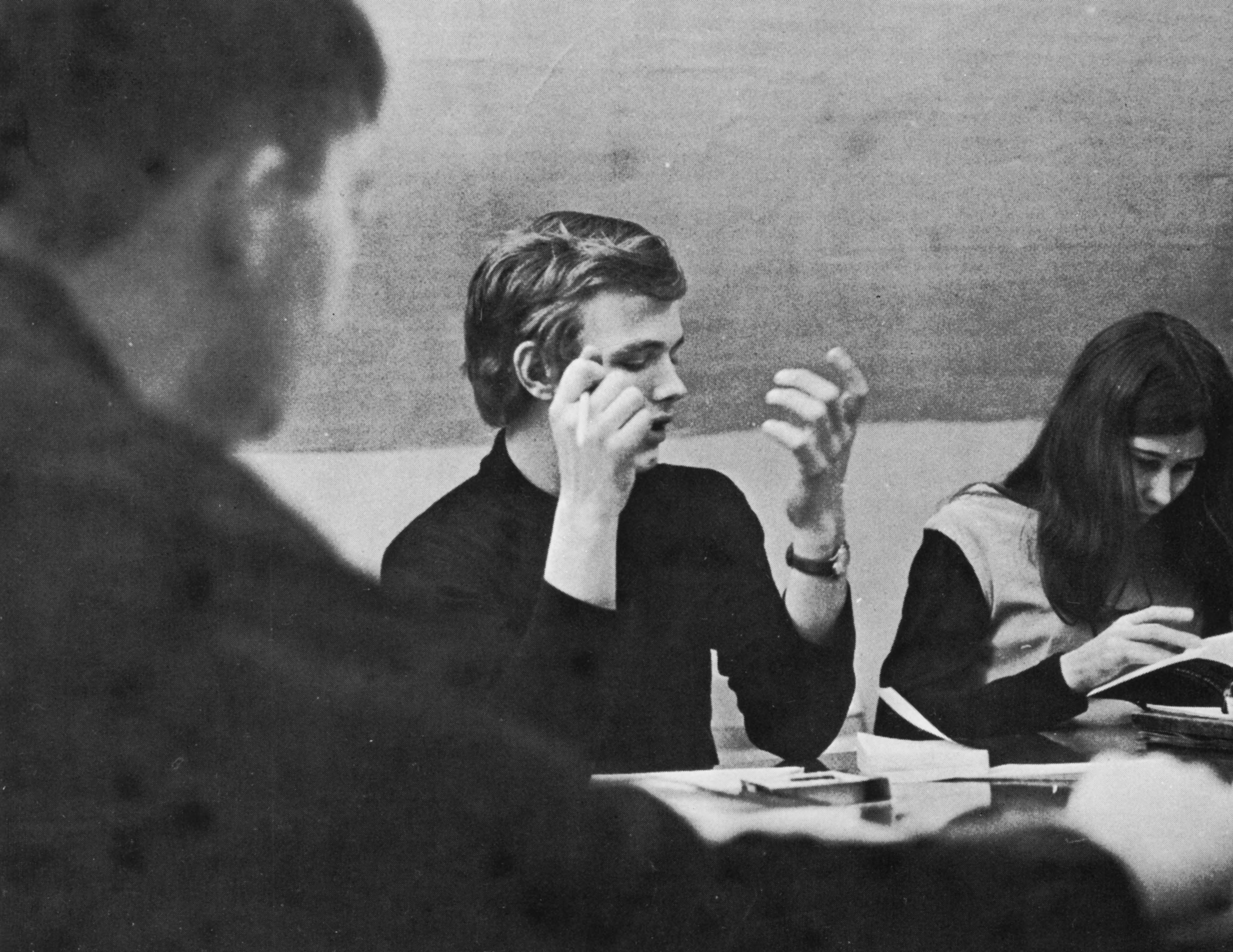
A student-centered class at Shimer College

Student-centered learning environments have been shown to be effective in higher education. They have been defined specifically within higher education as both a mindset and a culture within a given educational institution and as a learning approach broadly related to, and supported by, constructivist theories of learning. They are characterized by innovative methods of teaching which aim to promote learning in communication with teachers and other learners and which take students seriously as active participants in their own learning and foster transferable skills such as problem-solving, critical thinking, and reflective thinking. The revised European Standards and Guidelines for Quality Assurance (ESG) approved by the Ministerial Conference in Yerevan on 15 May 2015 include the following passage on student-centered learning: "Institutions should ensure that the programmes are delivered in a way that encourages students to take an active role in creating the learning process, and [should ensure] that the assessment of students reflects this approach."

A research university in Hong Kong sought to promote student-centered learning across the entire university by employing the following methods:

- Analysis of good practice by award-winning teachers, in all faculties, to show how they made use of active forms of student learning.
- Subsequent use of the analysis to promote wider use of good practice.
- A compulsory teacher training course for new junior teachers, which encouraged student-centered learning.
- Projects funded through teaching development grants, of which 16 were concerned with the introduction of active learning experiences.
- A program-level quality enhancement initiative that utilized a student survey to identify strengths and potential areas for improvement.
- Development of a model of a broadly based teaching and learning environment influencing the development of generic capabilities to provide evidence of the need for an interactive learning environment.
- The introduction of program reviews as a quality assurance measure.

The success of this initiative was evaluated by surveying the students. After two years, the mean ratings indicating the students' perception of the quality of the teaching and learning environment at the university all rose significantly. The study is one of many examining the process of implementing student-centered pedagogies in large institutions of higher education.

== See also ==
- Constructivism (learning theory)
- Educational progressivism
- Experiential education
- Inquiry-based learning
- Learning environment
- Personal learning environment
- Phenomenon-based learning
- Problem-based learning
- Project-based learning
- Public sphere pedagogy
- Purpose-centered education
- SCALE-UP
- Teaching method
