= Thematic learning =

Highlighting a theme for teaching purposes

Thinking of possible connections around a certain theme

Thematic teaching (also known as thematic instruction) is the selecting and highlighting of a theme through an instructional unit or module, course, or multiple courses. It is often interdisciplinary, highlighting the relationship of knowledge across academic disciplines and everyday life. Themes can be topics or take the form of overarching questions. Thematic learning is closely related to interdisciplinary or integrated instruction, topic-, project- or phenomenon-based learning. Thematic teaching is commonly associated with elementary classrooms and middle schools using a team-based approach, but this pedagogy is equally relevant in secondary schools and with adult learners. A common application is that of second or foreign language teaching, where the approach is more commonly known as theme-based instruction. Thematic instruction assumes students learn best when they can associate new information holistically with across the entire curriculum and with their own lives, experiences, and communities.

== Steps ==
Under the thematic learning instruction, organization of curriculum can be based on a macro or micro theme, depending upon the topic to be covered.

- Choosing a theme: Themes about the particular topic should be of interest to students and relevant to the curriculum. In some approaches, students choose the thematic topic. Themes should also be topics of interest to the teacher(s) because successful thematic instructions often requires additional research and preparation. Interdisciplinary themes related to multiple academic disciplines such as science, social studies, math, language/writing, and other courses or subjects can be reinforced in lessons throughout the school day.
  - Themes relevant to students' interests encourage active participation. For example, students may express interest in current popular music. This interest can be developed into thematic instructional units and lessons that span across time and cultures, how cultures interact and impact one another, music as a social or political commentary in social studies or history classes.
  - Themes allowing past to present connections and highlight persistent issued faced by society such as war, poverty, pollution, disease, or natural disasters are especially effective.
- Doing the research: Effective interdisciplinary thematic instruction requires extensive knowledge and research by the teacher. Without a broad knowledge base on which to design relevant activities and lessons, thematic lessons can become randomly selected activities loosely related to a topic that fail to demand higher level thinking from students.
- Design an essential question(s) relevant to the theme. Essential questions are open-ended, intellectually engaging questions that demand higher-order thinking. Essential questions focus a thematic inquiry, helping the teacher chose the most important facts and concepts relative to the theme and focus planning efforts. Essential questions require students to learn the key facts and concepts related to the theme as well as analyze and evaluate the importance and relevance of that information. Good essential questions cannot be answered with a simple yes/no or true/false; students must discuss, defend, and debate issues related to the theme. Designing thematic instruction around essential questions requires that students learn both content and develop critical analysis skills.
- Designing instructional units and activities that guide students in answering the essential question. Teachers must choose teaching and learning strategies, activities, classroom materials, and experiences related to the wider theme and guide students in answering the essential question. Strategies can be individual or cooperative; stress various skills such as reading, writing, or presenting.

== Curriculum ==
For thematic learning to be successful among learners, the following should be considered:

- Thematic learning consists of a curriculum that is unified and dwells on an identified theme or topic, ideally guided by essential questions.
- The sources are not limited to textbooks. For example, in the social studies or history classroom, primary source texts and images encourage the development of critical reading skills. For themes related to current events, analysis of modern media hones media literacy skills.
- Various teaching and learning methods can be used. Projects, cooperative learning, active participation, experiential learning are often highlighted.
- Thinking and problem solving skills, observation, critical reasoning, analysis and drawing conclusions are key skills in thematic learning.

== Advantages ==
- Students learn better when experiencing knowledge in a larger context. They begin to see relationships and connections across time, place, and disciplines.
- Learning about wider themes and related concepts and facts more closely resembles how life is experienced outside of school and the classroom.
- Themes can be chosen that are current and student-centered, incorporating the needs, interests and perspectives of the students.
- Carefully selecting topics and information related to a theme helps teachers narrow the overwhelming amount of information of any discipline.
- Thematic instructions aligns with current popular pedagogies and standards including place-based education, project-based education, and cooperative learning.
- When thematic instruction takes place along with cooperative learning, the advantages include the following:
  - Thematic cooperative learning activities encourage authentic communication.
  - The learner shares one's ideas with others in the group.
  - Interaction encourages the values of respect and cooperation, thus building effective peer learning groups.
  - The teacher becomes the facilitator, reduces the role of dispenser of learning.

== See also ==
- Interdisciplinary teaching
