= Learning space =

Physical setting for a learning environment

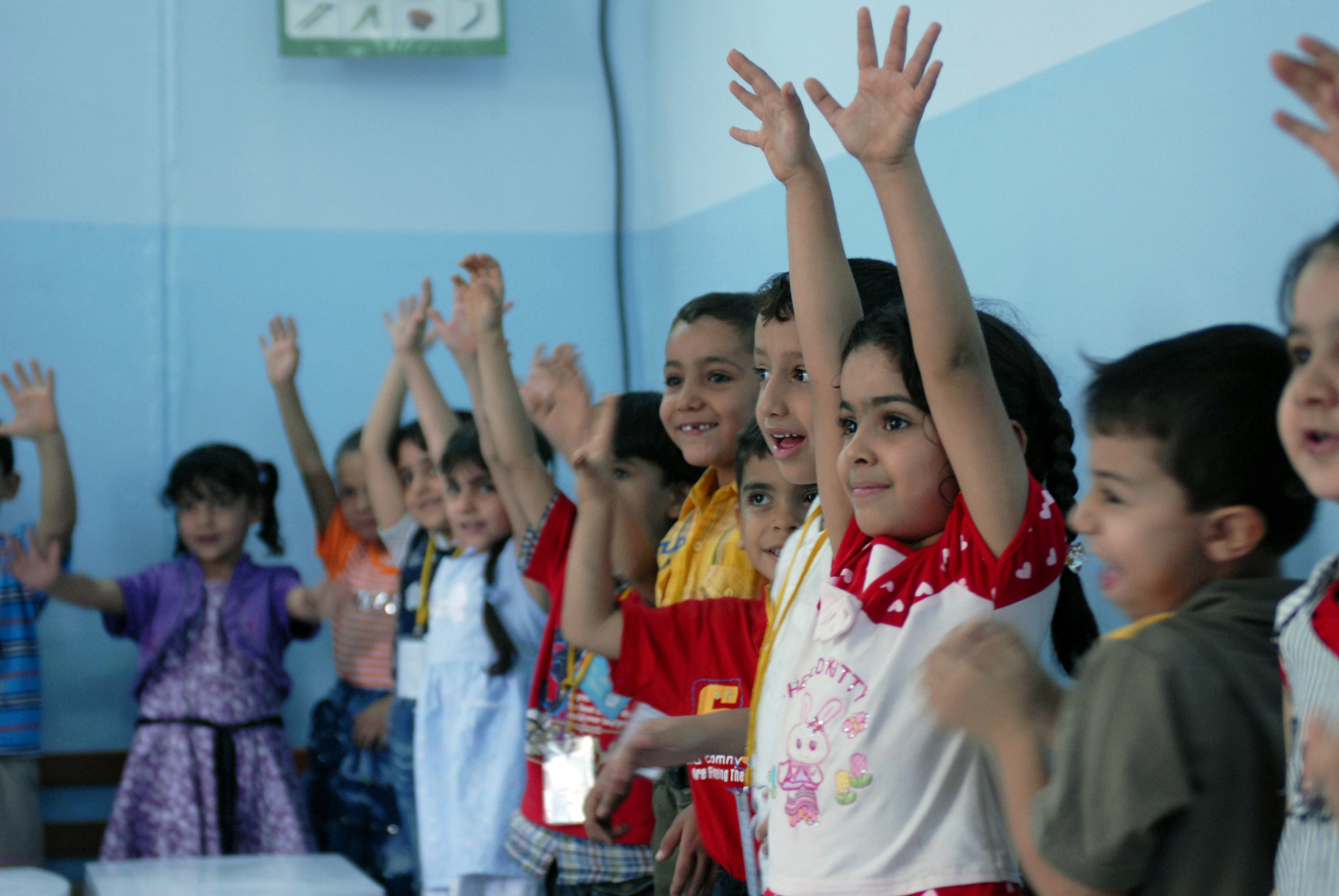
Learning spaces are the physical settings for learning environments of all kinds.

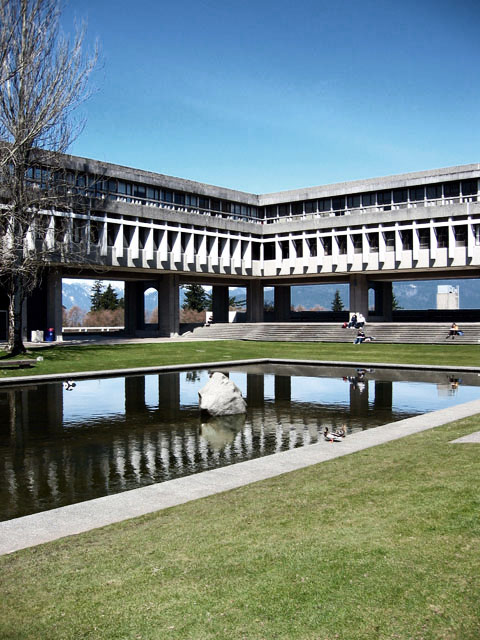
Simon Fraser University, academic quadrangle

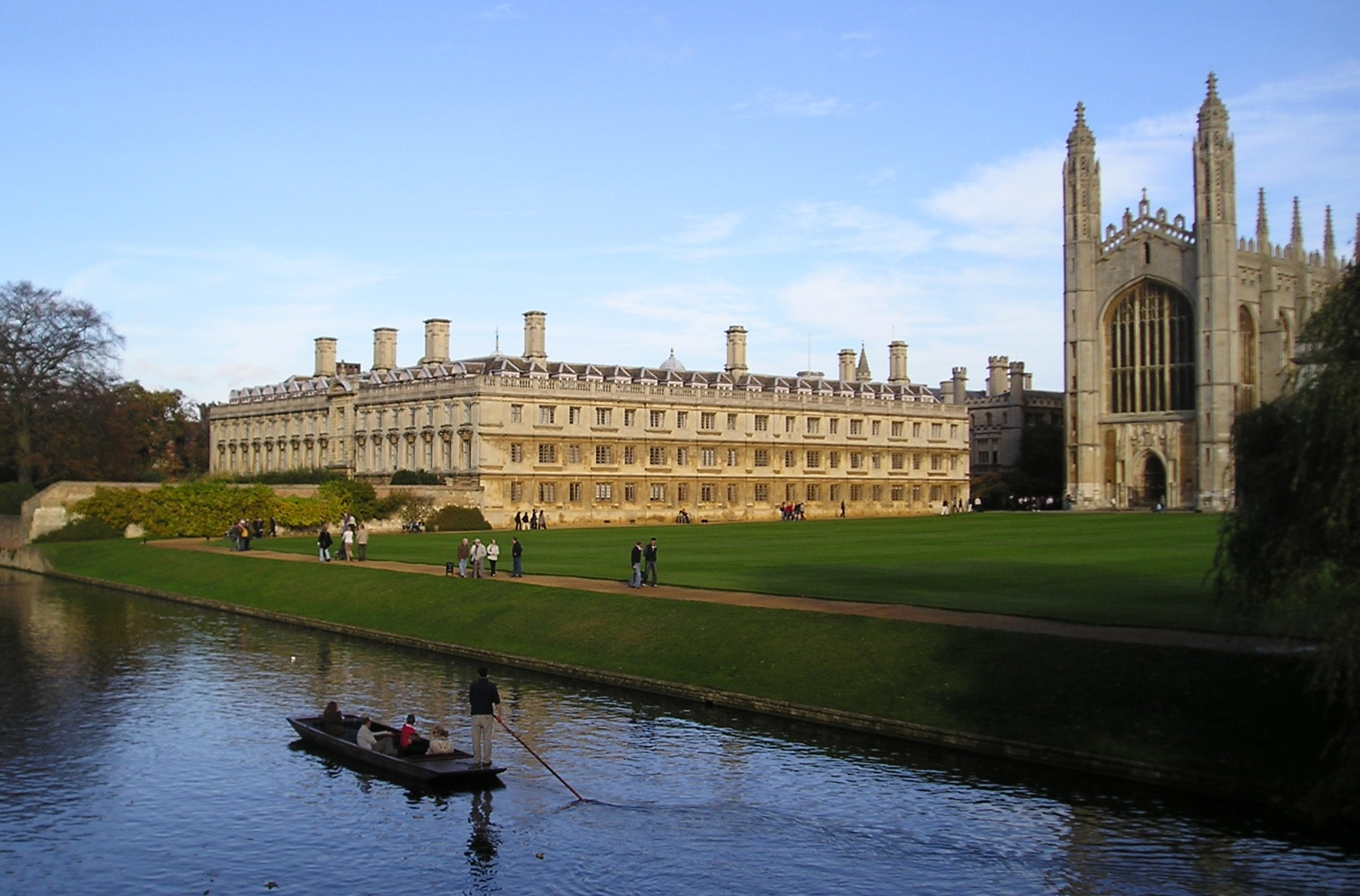
Kings College, Cambridge University

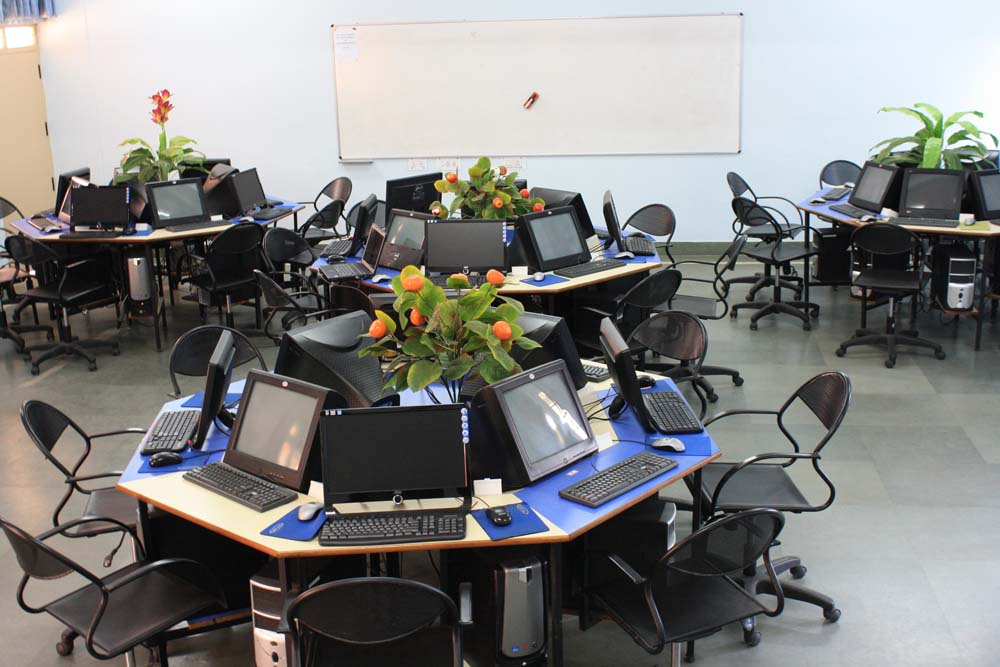
Computer lab in Bangalore

Learning space or learning setting is a physical setting for a learning environment, a place in which teaching and learning occur. It may be an indoor or outdoor location, either actual or virtual. Learning spaces are highly diverse in use, configuration, location, and educational institution. They support a variety of pedagogies, including quiet study, passive or active learning, kinesthetic or physical learning, vocational learning, experiential learning, and others. As the design of a learning space impacts the learning process, it is deemed important to design a learning space with the learning process in mind.

== History ==
The word school derives from Greek σχολή (scholē), originally meaning "leisure" and also "that in which leisure is employed", and later "a group to whom lectures were given, school". The Japanese word for school, gakuen, means "learning garden" or "garden of learning". Kindergarten is a German word whose literal meaning is "garden for the children", however the term was coined in the metaphorical sense of a "place where children can grow in a natural way".

Over time different methods of instruction have led to different types of learning spaces. Direct instruction is perhaps civilization's oldest method of formal, structured education and continues to be a dominant form throughout the world. In its essence it involves the transfer of information from one who possesses more knowledge to one who has less knowledge, either in general or in relation to a particular subject or idea. This method is commonly used in traditional classrooms. The Socratic method was developed over two millennia ago in response to direct instruction in the scholae of Ancient Greece. Its dialectic, questioning form continues to be an important form of learning in western schools of law. This method is commonly used in seminar rooms and smaller lecture halls. Hands-on learning, a form of active and experiential learning, predates language and the ability to convey knowledge by means other than demonstration, and has been shown to be one of the more effective means of learning and over the past two decades has been given an increasingly important role in education. This method is used in outdoor learning spaces, specialty labs, studios, vocational shops, maker spaces, and in physical education facilities.

== Institutions ==
Institutions that provide learning spaces can be categorized in several ways, including:

- Student age: kindergarten, elementary or primary school, middle school, secondary or high school
- Academic level: school, college, university, graduate school
- Physical, mental, or social development: special education, school for the deaf, school for the blind, etc.
- Pedagogy: traditional education, progressive education, Montessori, Reggio Emilia approach, Waldorf schools, etc.
- Subject or focus: STEM, magnet school, vocational or trades school, flight school, sailing school, dive shops, finishing school, etc.
- Organizational, institutional, or philosophical type: public or state school, private school, independent school, community school, military school, parochial school
- Location: neighborhood, distance learning, online or virtual school or classroom, outdoor school or classroom

== Organizational models ==
Learning environments are frequently organized into six pedagogical and physical models:

- Departmental model
- Integrative model
- Project-based learning model
- Academy model
- Small learning communities model
- School-within-a-school model

== Significance ==
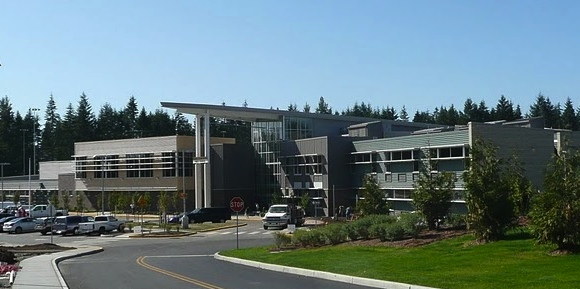
Lynnwood High School is a 2009 facility that incorporates many advanced design features of 21st century pedagogical and learning spaces.

The physical, and/or virtual, characteristics of learning spaces play a strong role in their effectiveness and, by impacting student learning, on society. As Winston Churchill stated: "we shape our buildings and afterwards our buildings shape us."

The importance of interactions between individuals and their environment have long been established by Kurt Lewin's field theory and life space, Urie Bronfenbrenner's concept of microsystem, Jean Lave and Etienne Wenger's situated learning theory, and others. Rearch continues to show us that active learning, and learning spaces configured to support active learning, contribute to more effective learning and encourage different methods of instruction.

== Spatial characteristics ==
Learning spaces extend well beyond real-world, "brick and mortar" educational institutions. They are increasingly varied in style, configuration, and location. Their physical characteristics include many variables, including size, form, and shape; environmental; technological; space type and appropriateness for its intended activity and users; location; and numerous others. A basic tenet of learning spaces housed in buildings is to provide shelter, although many facilities from campuses to portable classrooms, do not provide shelter between individual spaces. Outdoor learning spaces rely on clothing and personal items to maintain comfort. The location of the learning space affects both its functional and operational interrelationships with other spaces, student and instructor cohorts, learning programs, and support spaces. The proportion of a space's height-width-length can affect the ability of learners to see instructional or demonstration material or the presenter. The orientation of the space towards adjacent spaces or the outdoor environment can affect activities, thermal comfort, as well as daylight penetration (if any) at different times of the day. Increased demand for flexibility and adaptability have seen greater use of (operable partition walls) to combine and separate spaces. Safety and security in schools, including major incidents of violence, bullying, and vandalism have led to increased use of security monitoring systems, strategies such crime prevention through environmental design (CPTED), and sometimes competing discussions of transparency versus visible lockdown of learning spaces.

=== Temperature ===
Thermal comfort of a learning space is important for student comfort, and therefore learning. This is affected by several factors: ambient room temperature, air movement (via open windows, mechanical ventilation, drafts across cold surfaces, and room fans), and solar exposure. Insulating windows, shaded windows, and careful placement of ventilation ducts can all affect the comfort.

=== Ventilation ===
Appropriate levels of ventilation is critical to occupant health, comfort, and cognitive functions, all required for effective learning. Recent studies at Harvard University and Syracuse University reported significant cognitive impairment from impurities in the air. Significant cognitive deficits were observed in performance scores in environments with increasing concentrations of either volatile organic compounds (VOCs) or carbon dioxide. The highest impurity levels reached in the study are not uncommon in some classroom or office environments. Filtering the air to reduce dust and pollen can be important to help prevent allergic reactions in students.

=== Views ===
Theories that views out of windows cause distractions were one of the prime motivations for the windowless classroom of the 1960s and 70s. More recent studies have demonstrated that views of nature potentially improve health and well-being and that more stimulating environments foster improvements in learning and retention. Ophthalmologists have stressed the importance of distant views to help relax the eye engaged in close work, such as on a video or computer monitor. Attention Restoration Theory suggests that views of natural scenes have the potential to restore a person's ability to focus and concentrate after intense cognitive activity.

=== Natural light ===
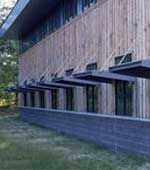
Exterior shades or light shelves provide shade to the room without interrupting views.

Natural light in any space can be provided through windows, doors, or skylights. Providing natural light has been shown to be highly impactful on a learning space. Properly controlled and located, it has been demonstrated to have measurably positive impacts on student academic performance and behavior. If not properly controlled and located, it can interfere with abilities to read, view demonstration materials, or cause physical discomfort. Control methods include fixed or adjustable window coverings, exterior sunshades, interior light shelves, or dimmable "Smart glass".

=== Light ===
For those learning spaces that don't have access to adequate natural light, artificial light is required to support effective learning. Lighting levels, type, color rendition, and fixture type are all important components for different learning styles and activities. Classrooms with direct instruction require different levels of illumination than those using computer or video monitors. Specific task lighting may be required to supplement general room lighting in science labs, vocational shops, or gymnasia. Color rendition and color temperature (the perceived color of light) can affect student moods and the educational content or project (e.g. art project). As with natural light, personalizing the lighting through manual occupant controls can provide the greatest flexibility and user satisfaction.

=== Acoustics ===
Research has shown that children require much quieter learning spaces with less reverberation to hear and understand spoken words than do adults. Even normal, healthy listeners younger than 13 have a much more difficult time distinguishing verbal signals from background noise. Students who have hearing loss (e.g. from ear infections), who are learning a new language, or have auditory or attention problems required even more favorable acoustics in order to understand speech. In response, acceptable limits of background noise in classrooms have been reduced to 35 dBA and 55 dBC by the American National Standards Institute (ANSI).

=== Finishes ===
The finishes of walls, floors, ceilings, and furniture can have significant effects on the functionality, durability, and effectiveness of the learning space. Light levels, glare, mood, and color rendition are affected by reflectance of surfaces. Acoustics are affected by the absorptive properties of ceilings, walls, and floors; carpet reduces footfall impact noise and reverberation; painted drywall or plaster ceilings increase reverberance and clarity of speech. Durability, which affects aesthetics over time, can determine the longer term usefulness and effectiveness of the space, including possible long-term health impacts on students. Cleanliness is also a factor in maintaining a healthy environment, in particular for young students who tend to be in greater physical contact with floor and wall surfaces than others.

== Furniture ==
In order for learning spaces to operate for more than a few minutes at a time, furniture for students and instructors is needed. Together with the air in the room, this is the most direct interaction occupants have with their space. Configuration and ergonomics need to be attuned to the activities in the learning space for learning to be most effective. Historically student desks and chairs (or benches) were aligned in rows facing the front of the classroom, often secured to the floor. This supported passive learning and methods of direct instruction but does not support active and student-centered learning. Active learning, including collaboration, group activity, and project-based learning, requires students to move between furniture and spaces and requires different configurations of furniture, often within the same instructional period. As instructors move away from the lecture podium to interact, consult, and guide the students, they too need to move. An awareness of the importance of personalization and differentiation in learning activities and environments. Studies indicate that people, and young students in particular, need to move about frequently. These indicate that a variety of furniture types, configurations, and flexibility can contribute to the effectiveness of learning spaces. Personal technology, often hand-held, also demands different postures and positions for people to sit, stand, or relax in. Chairs with tablet arms for taking notes are not useful to hold laptop computers, and hand-held devices are often supported on knees and thighs, not furniture.

== Technology ==
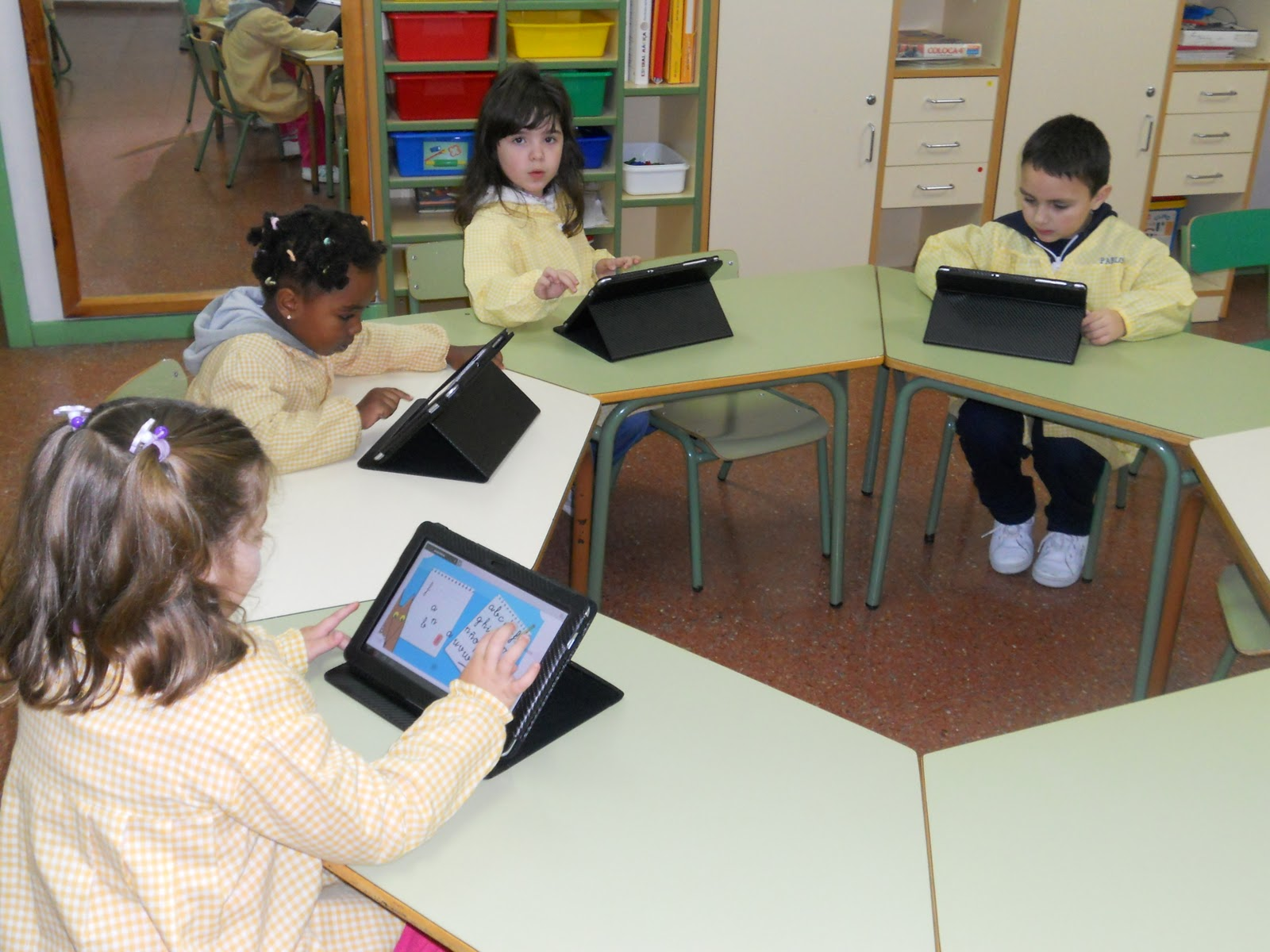
Young students with tablets

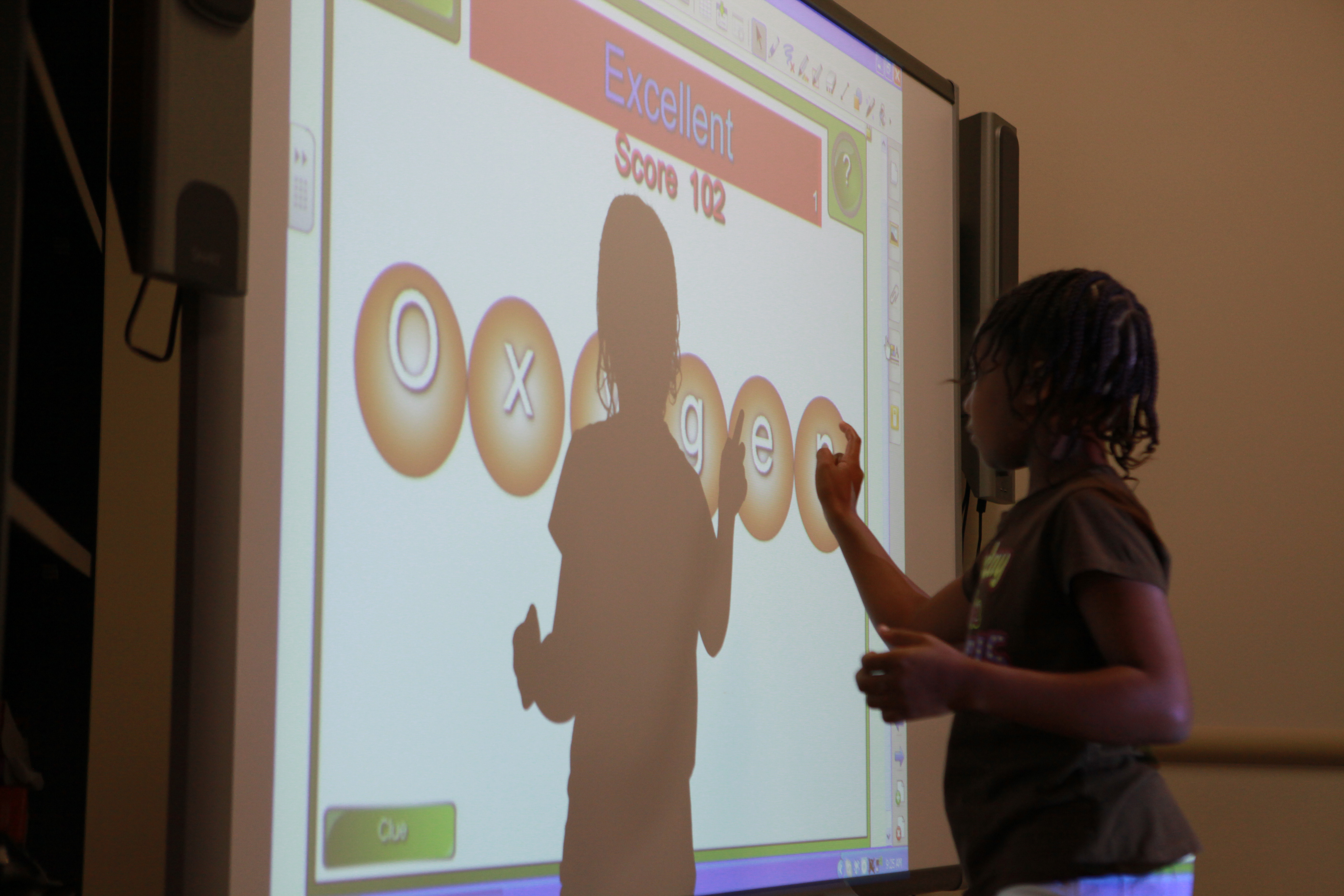
Student using an interactive whiteboard ("Smart Board")

Until recently, technology in the learning space was almost exclusively for the use of instructors. Students now have greater access to classroom technology and personal technology in the classroom. With Internet access, e-books, and other digital content, the technology has moved beyond simply presentation types to actual research, generation, collaboration, and presentation or publishing. Key technologies in modern learning spaces include: projectors, interactive whiteboards and projectors, computers (desktop, laptop, tablet, or mobile devices), document cameras, digital cameras, video conferencing, sound and video playback systems, voice enhancement, Wi-Fi, Internet access, and others.

Mobile and personal technology is transforming the way learning spaces are used and configured. It allows learning – including research, collaboration, creating, writing, production, and presentation – to occur almost anywhere. For example, mobile devices allow an easier communication to the students. Its robust tools support creativity of thought – through collaboration, generation, and production that does not require manual dexterity. It fosters personalization of learning spaces by teachers and students, which both supports the learning activity directly as well as indirectly through providing a greater feeling of ownership and relevancy.

== Sustainability ==
Sustainable (or 'green') architecture is design that seeks to minimize the negative environmental impact of buildings through efficient and moderate use of materials, energy, and development space. It uses a conscious approach to energy and ecological conservation in the design of the built environment. he intent of sustainability (or ecological design) is to ensure that current actions and decisions do not inhibit the opportunities of future generations. Sustainable attributes are recognized for their importance in the effectiveness of learning spaces, from perspectives of occupant comfort and health, stewardship of public funds, and as demonstration tools to support sustainable initiatives or become part of the school curriculum. There are various rating systems for the performance and incorporation of sustainable features in buildings in general and schools and other learning spaces. These include requirements and rating systems from (LEED, BREEAM, Energy Star, Collaborative for High Performance Schools, The 2030 °Challenge, Living Building Challenge, various state-level standards for schools (e.g. Washington Sustainable Schools Protocol), which may be mandated, encouraged, or voluntary, depending on the jurisdiction.

Learning spaces must be sustainable and ease education for Sustainable Development as smart classrooms do.

== Educational facilities types ==
Learning spaces are provided in a variety of institutions, buildings, environments, and organizational models.

=== One room schools ===
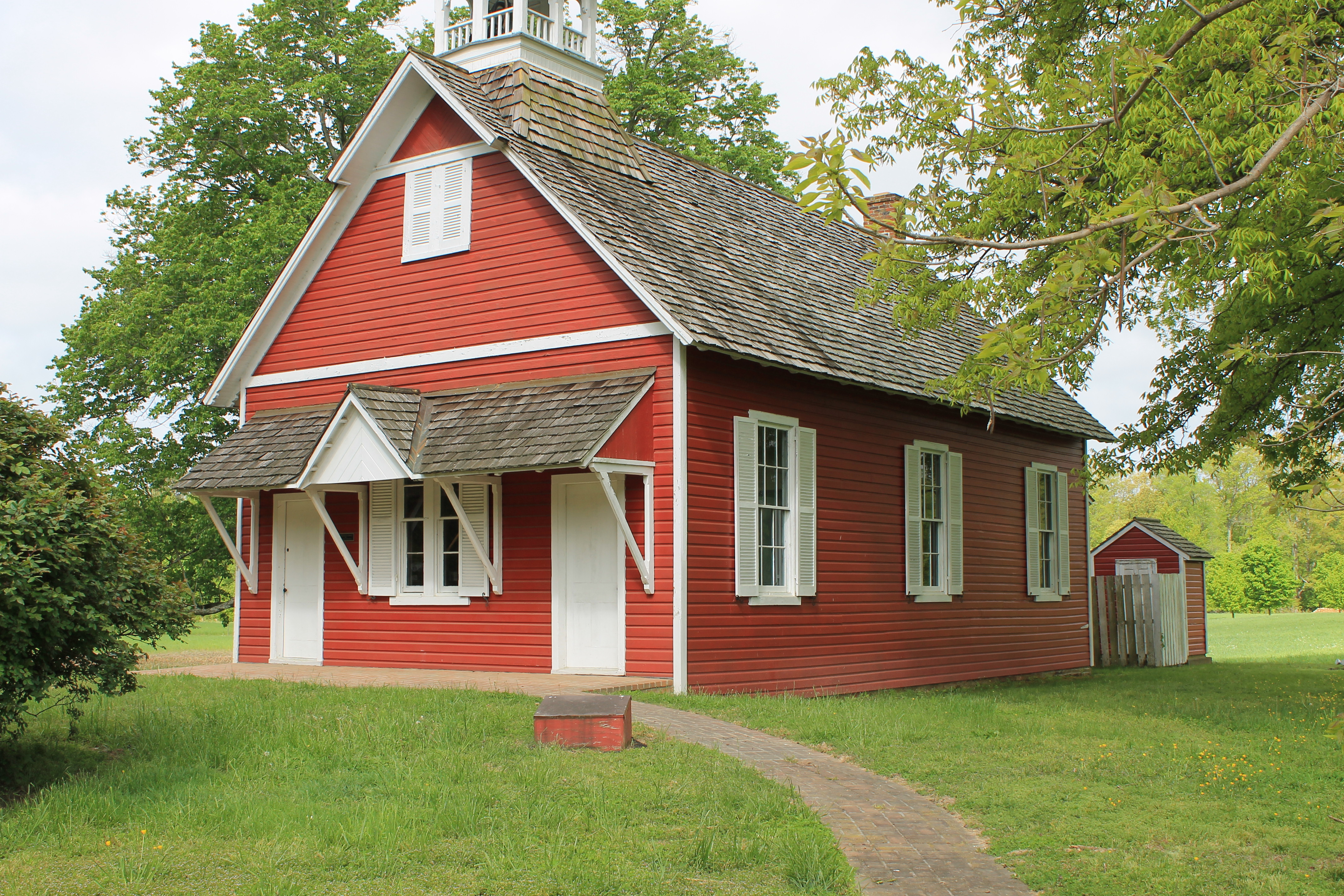
Traditional "little red schoolhouse", Maryland, USA

This model, also termed shrools, were commonplace throughout rural portions of various countries in Europe, North America, and the Commonwealth throughout the 19th and early 20th century, primarily in rural (country) and small towns. The design was very straightforward - all of the students met in a single room with a single teacher teaching academic basics to several grade levels of elementary-age students. While in many areas one-room schools are no longer used, it is not uncommon for them to remain in developing nations and rural or remote areas, including remote parts of the American West, the Falklands Islands, and the Shetland Islands. With modern digital technology providing connections to distant resources and communities, this model is being given renewed scrutiny as a viable form.

=== Traditional schools ===
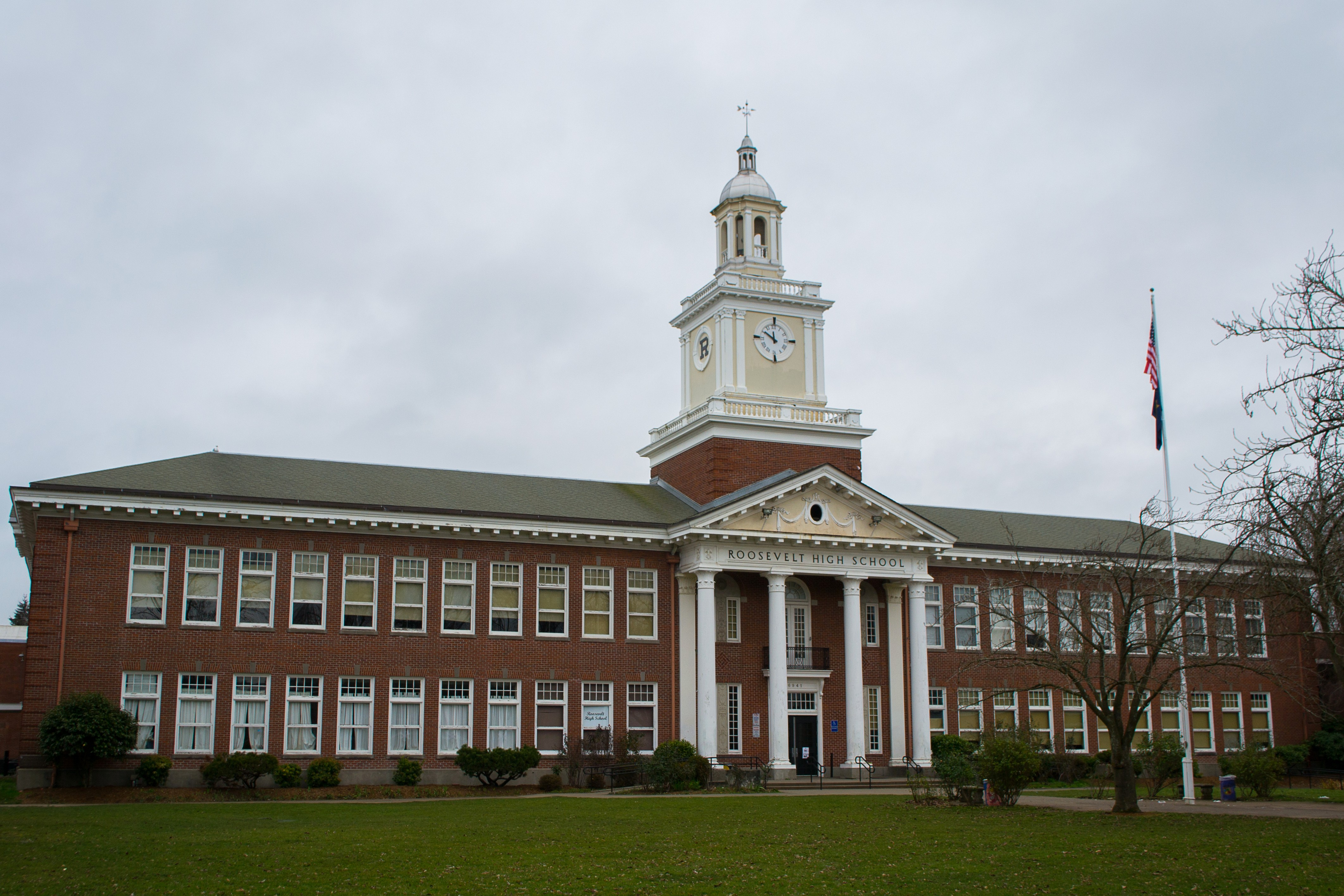
Traditional early 20th century "factory model" school, Roosevelt High School, Oregon, USA

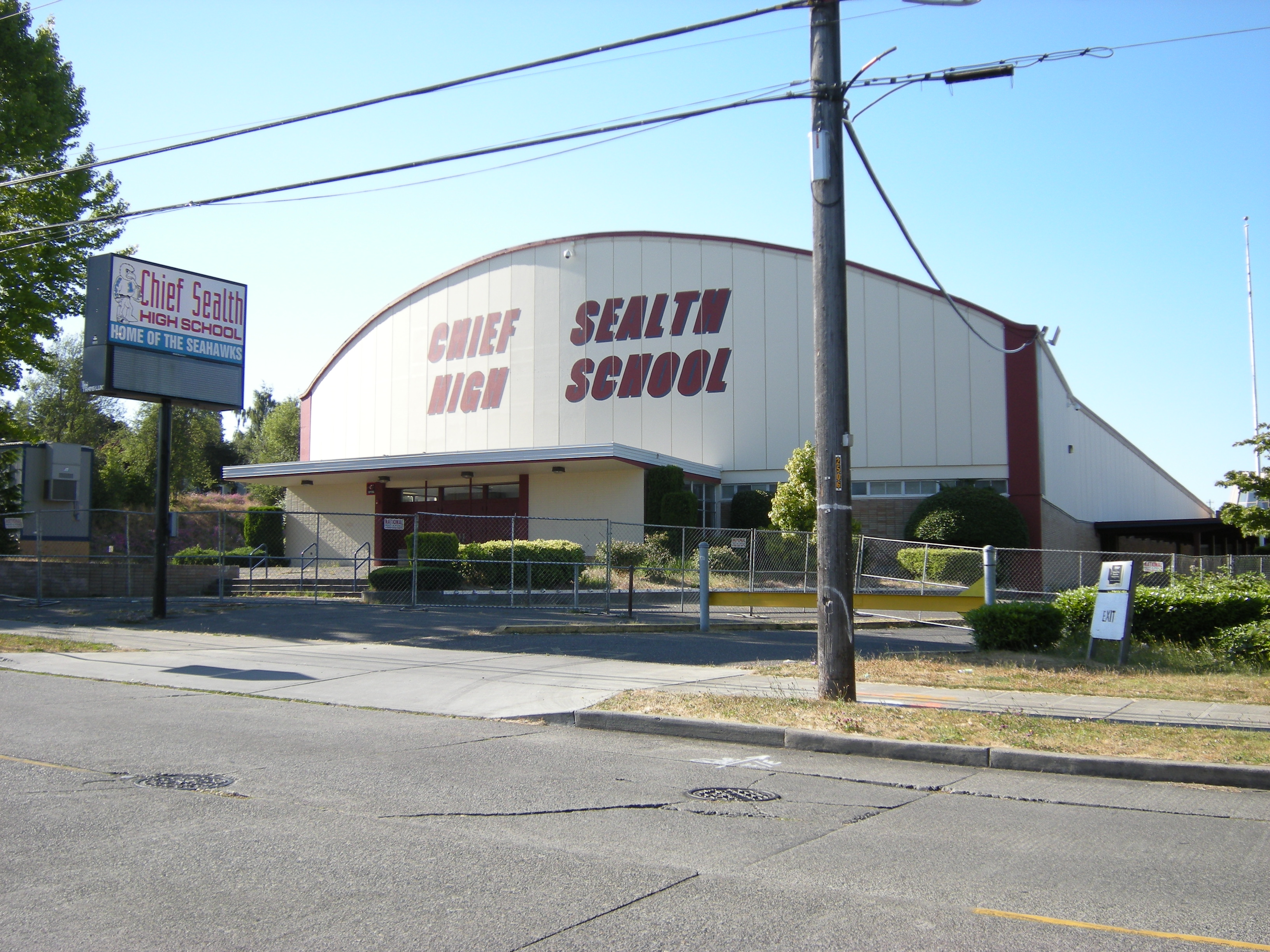
Mid-20th century "factory-model" Chief Sealth High School, prior to 2010 renovation

This model, also known as '"factory model schools'", which developed in the late 19th and early 20th centuries, are the most common form of school in many parts of the world. Classrooms and the facilities were configured into "assembly lines", similar to the pedagogy that shares its approach. Standardization and efficiencies of space, time, and materials are key components of this model. Student desks and chairs were arranged in rows, often secured in place, facing the teaching wall. Classrooms were also arranged in rows along double-loaded corridors. This model is also known as the "cells and bells" model. After World War II and the emergence of the International Style of architecture, mass production, maximization of efficiencies of space and volume, and cost-efficient materials replaced ornamentation and aesthetic considerations in design, so the schools began to look as factory-like as they were configured and operated.

=== Open plan schools ===
Open plan schools and open plan classrooms in Europe and North America developed in the 1960s from the progressive education movement. In parallel with a student-centered pedagogy, these facilities without interior walls were built to foster team teaching, student mobility between "learning areas", and to save costs in building and operating the facilities. Lack of acoustic separation and claims of visual distraction made many of these schools unpopular. Many were built during the energy crisis of the early 1970s and together with an inward focus, windows were reduced or eliminated from the learning areas. This design also resulted in poor indoor air quality and low levels natural light, which more recent studies have shown are critical to an effective learning space.

=== Advisory schools ===
In this model, core-subject teachers have dual roles as advisors and teachers in their area of expertise. Instead of general classrooms, schools are designed with advisory spaces, which are open areas containing flexible workstations, and conference and collaboration areas. There are also areas for subjects requiring special equipment, such as art and music. Students work on their own pace until they achieve mastery learning, eliminating school bells, semesters, and school years. The advisory model encourages building peer-to-peer relationships between students of varying ages and backgrounds, which lessens negative social behavior such as bullying and the development of cliques.

=== Small learning communities ===
The Small Learning Community (SLC) model is structured to provide a more personalized learning environment, including collaboration amongst teachers and between students, interdisciplinary studies, and project-based learning, although schools need not offer any or all of these aspects in their curriculum model. SLCs are essentially separate clusters or groupings of learning spaces, often with a central common or flexible learning area at their heart, with a variety of learning and group meeting rooms opening onto it, including several classrooms or learning studios, and a science lab. Theme-based or career-focused SLCs in particular may also incorporate special labs, makerspaces, or vocational shops. A school would have multiple SLCs, often with between 100 and 200 students, which can be operated on a departmental, academy, or small schools model.

=== Open air schools ===
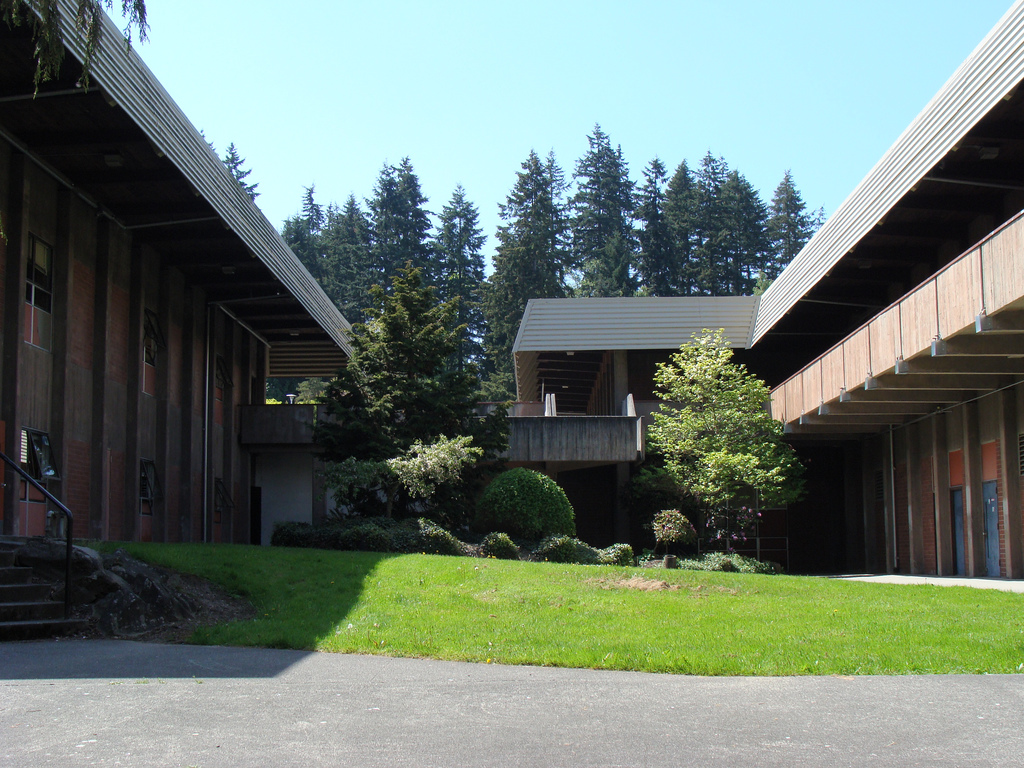
"California style", open air walkways at the original Lynnwood High School (now demolished)

This model, also known in some areas as California style schools, are collections of buildings that together form one school or learning institution but are not connected by indoor, enclosed corridors. All circulation between major spaces is out of doors. This is similar to a university or college campus, but with buildings not containing major indoor circulation routes as would be found in a faculty building. Some are provided with covered exterior walkways (or breezeways) between buildings or along the edges to provide shelter when moving between rooms. This design has been criticized due to its unsuitability in certain climates and concerns about safety and security with forcing students to go outside into unenclosed and unsecured areas.

=== Portable classrooms ===
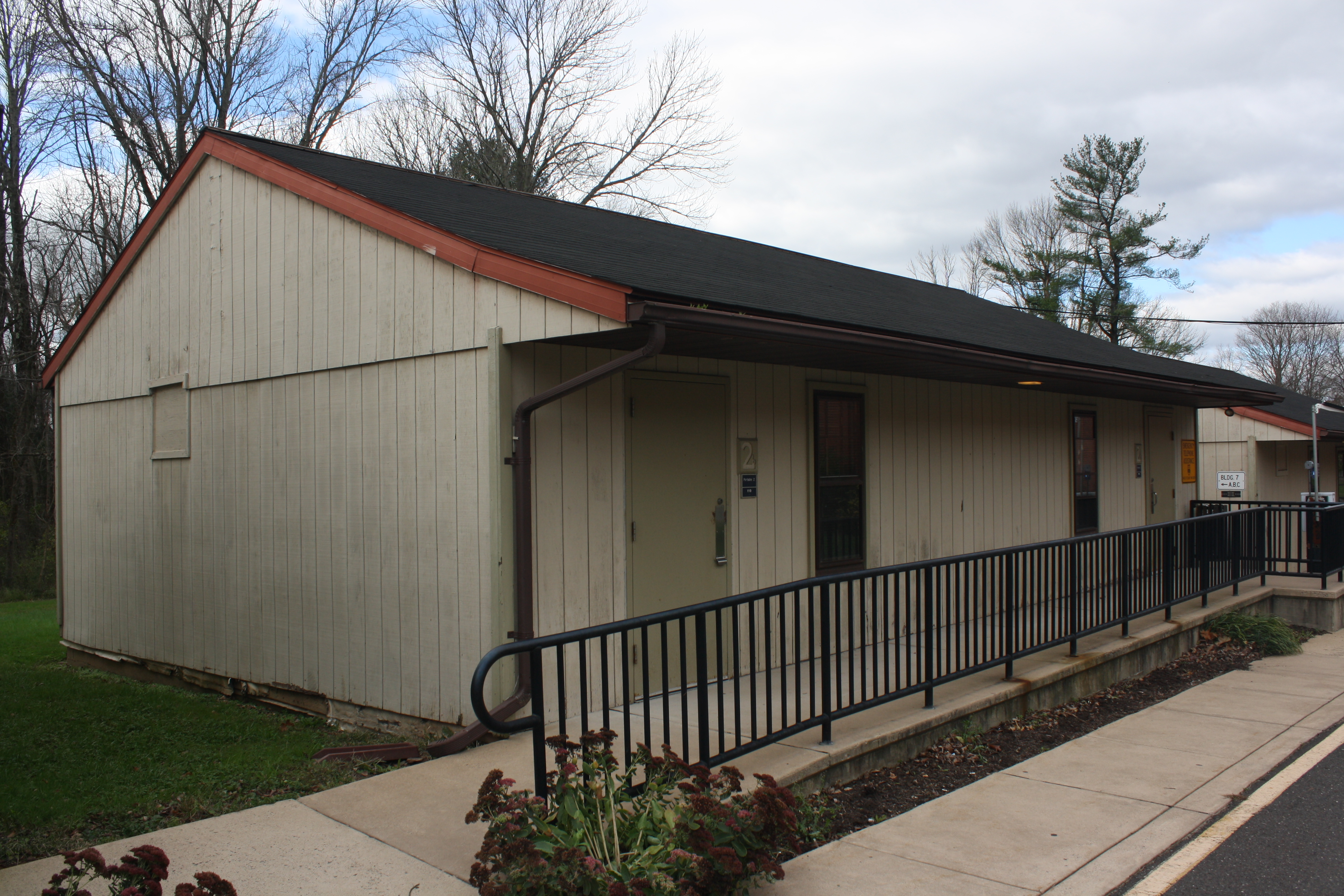
Portable classroom building

This model consists of modular buildings that are also colloquially known around the world as portables, bungalows, t-shacks, trailers, terrapins, huts, mobiles, t-buildings, or relocatables. They are pre-fabricated in a factory and delivered in two or more sections to an educational facility. There they are assembled into one or two classroom-sized buildings, normally without permanent foundations so they may be removed. Their normal purpose is to provide temporary classroom space for schools that require additional instructional space, either standard classrooms or for specialty art, science, or other programs. it is estimated that there are approximately 350,000 portable classrooms in use in the United States. They are seen as a cost-effective, quick, and temporary way to address school capacity issues. However, they often remain in use long after their useful lifespan, are not as energy efficient or durable as permanent buildings, and have been linked to health concerns in students from poor indoor environmental quality. Portable classrooms are normally installed as separate from permanent school buildings, either stand-alone, back-to-back in pairs (to share toilet facilities), or in clusters. As such they can form a distinct campus unto themselves or as they are often considered as temporary solutions to a problem, are not adequately planned for in terms of space, location, or services. They are also not designed to provide an optimal learning space tailored to the site, either with access, direction of natural light, or integration with other learning spaces in the school.

=== Outdoor classrooms ===
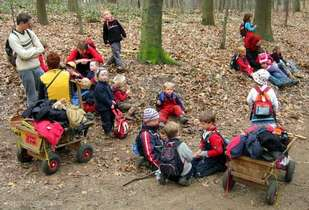
Forest kindergarten

This model describes the spaces in which outdoor education occurs. These spaces can be structured or fully natural and organic. The model can also involve any activities and spaces other than in an educational facility or classroom. It can encompass a wide variety of subjects, including biology field trips and searching for insects, as well as indoor activities like observing stock control in a local retail outlet, or visiting a museum. It typically supports active and inquiry-based learning and experiential learning, with a focus on students "doing." Examples of outdoor learning are Garden-based learning, Forest kindergarten, and Forest schools.

=== Virtual classrooms ===
This (VLE) model is a Web-based environment or platform for learning, usually within educational institutions. VLEs typically: allow participants to be organized into cohorts, groups and roles; present resources, activities and interactions within a course structure; provide for the different stages of assessment; report on participation; and have some level of integration with other institutional systems. VLEs have been adopted by most institutions of higher education in the English-speaking world. A virtual school is an online-based educational institution that may or may not have any "bricks and mortar" facilities open to students. The physical environment required to support this is essentially anything that which supports a person using the connecting devices – desktop, laptop, tablet, or hand-held devices. Key requirements include suitable ergonomic furniture or workstations, power, connectivity (Wi-Fi), lighting control, and acoustic isolation to minimize unwanted distraction. Increasingly this can be almost any environment with access to a wireless telephone, internet, or communications network.

=== Flipped classrooms ===
This model is a learning space that combines traditional "bricks and mortar" and virtual instructional spaces. This type of blended learning reverses the traditional educational arrangement by delivering instructional content, often online, outside of the classroom and traditional homework-style activities are moved into the classroom. This approach therefore relies on the transformation of students' after-hours locations (home or other) into learning spaces. This is similar to the educational approach used at higher grade levels and higher education institutions where more content is sourced outside the classroom and discussion, inquiry-based learning, and hands-on projects are undertaken at the educational facility. Outside of instructional hours, the digital environment becomes as integral as the physical environment, both of which are beyond the control of the instructor and increasingly so by the student.

== Types by activity ==
=== General education ===
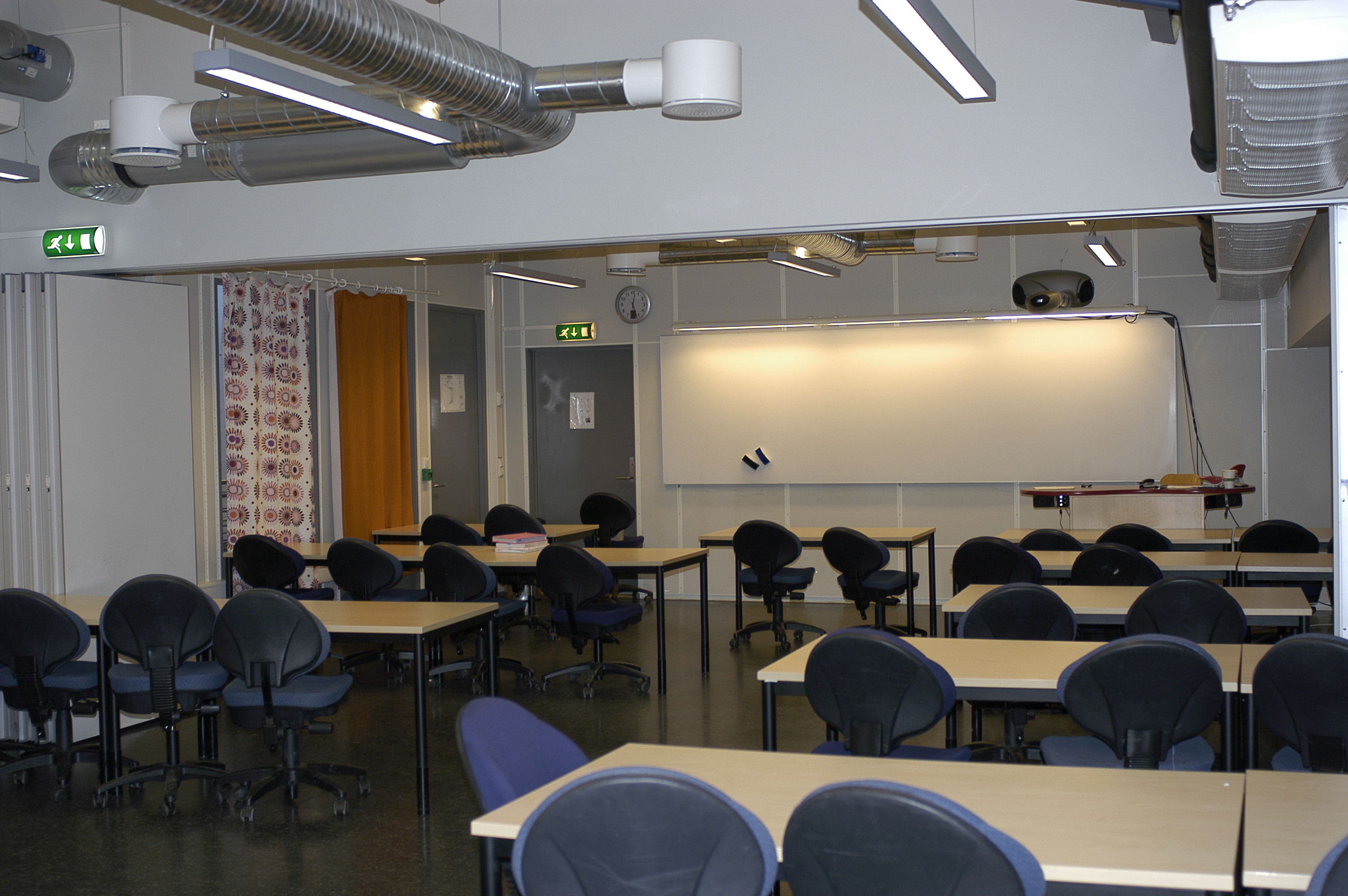
Modern direct instructional classroom

General education instruction is most commonly undertaken in classrooms. This involves the teaching and learning of a full range of subjects not requiring specialized spaces or equipment, including language arts, mathematics, and social sciences. It may also include art, science, and some physical activity, in particular for younger students where large spaces and special equipment and services are not required.

=== Specialized ===
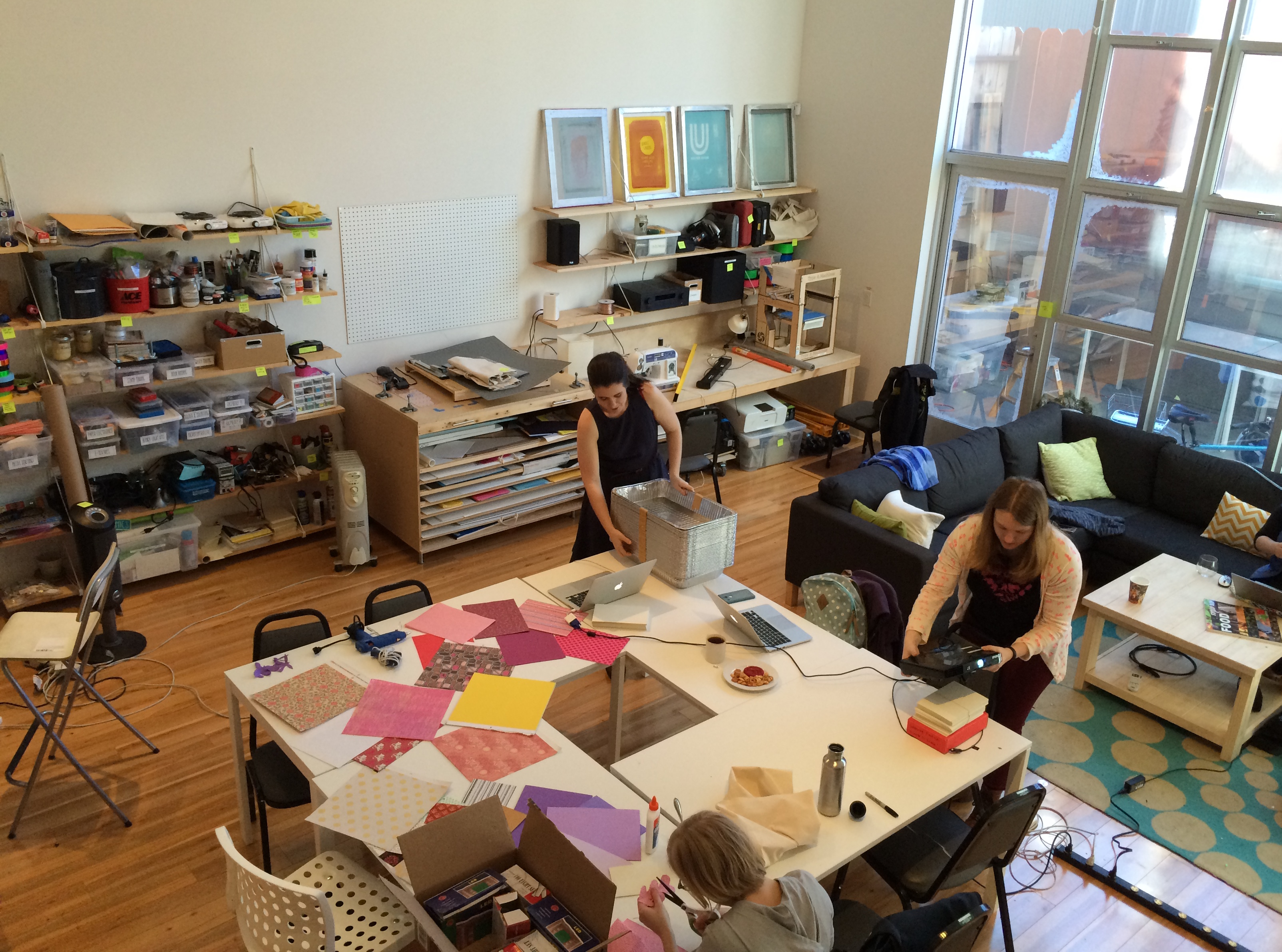
Makerspace with tools for crafts and technology projects

Laboratories, shops, studios, and similar rooms each have particular spatial, environmental, and equipment needs to support a specialized subject, including the following:

- Science lab:
- Computer lab:
- Vocational lab/shop:
- Makerspace, Hackerspace, or Library makerspace:
- Fine Arts studios:
- Music, band, choir practice, rehearsal, and performance, spaces.
- Special Education - resource or access room

=== Lecture ===
Lecture halls have been a primary learning space in colleges and universities for centuries. This spatial type supports passive learning and direct instruction, as well as the Socratic method, a form of cooperative argumentative dialogue between students and instructors. It is based on asking and answering questions to stimulate critical thinking, draw out ideas and underlying presumptions, and challenge positions.

=== Performance ===
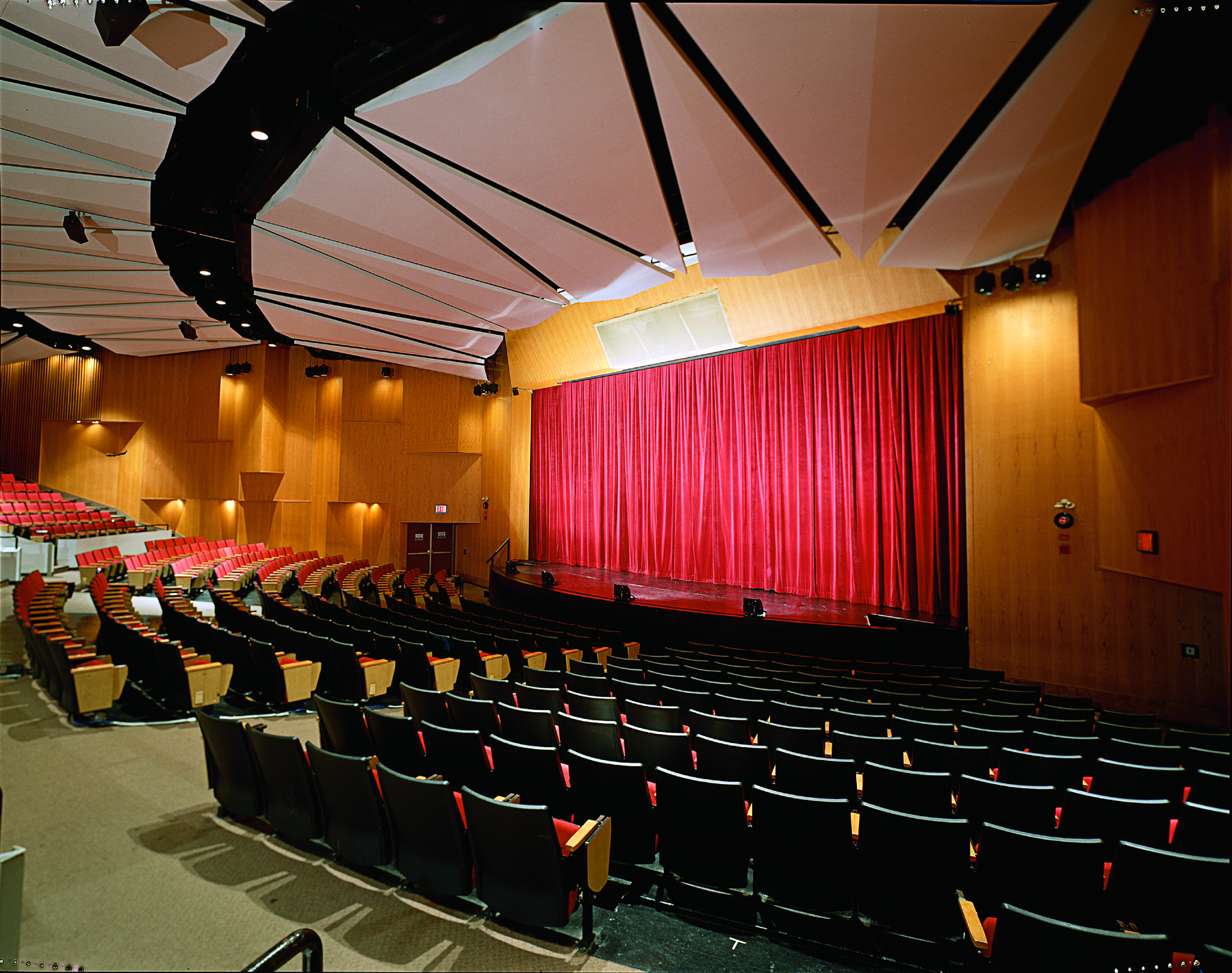
Theater One

Theaters and auditoria are normally found in larger and higher level learning institutions whose population base and curriculum support these spaces. Both are also frequently made available for use by outside community groups. An auditorium may serve as a performance space or a large instructional venue such as a lecture hall. It may or may not have a stage and its functions are sometimes combined with a cafeteria or lunch room, such as in a cafetorium. A theater may share similar functions but normally have a larger stage, partial or full height fly loft, an orchestra pit, and a higher level of theatre equipment and systems. A black box theater is also a space devoted to performances and rehearsals, although in a smaller setting and without a formal stage. A school theater also supports drama and other educational programs that involve producing a performance, including students learning to operate the theatre equipment, rigging, and sound and light systems. These differ from non school-based theaters as they may include additional safety features and space for instructors to demonstrate to students, as individuals or groups, in areas that normally might be sized or configured to have only one or a very few experienced operators.

=== Library and Learning Commons ===
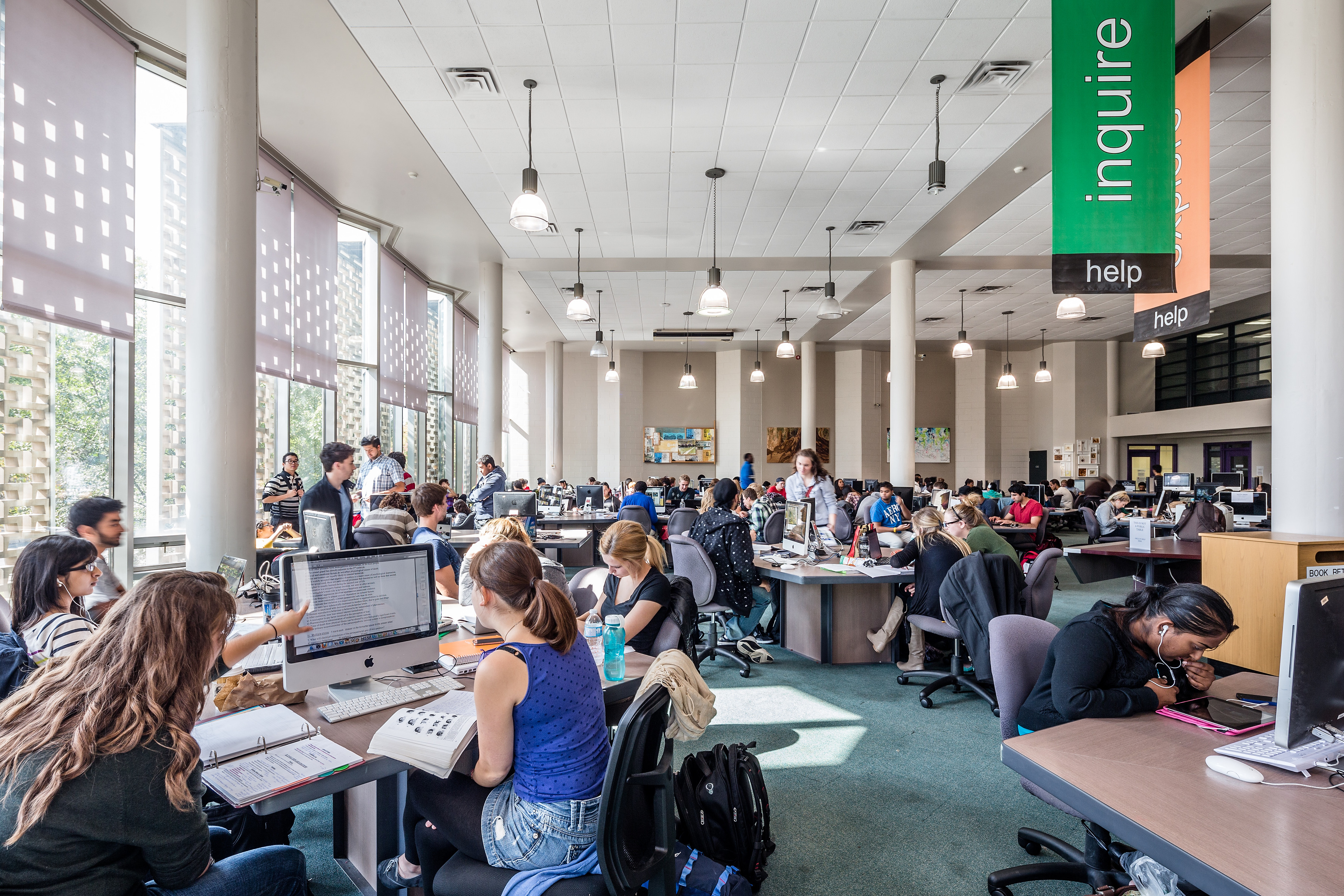
Learning Commons at McMaster University

A school library (or a school library media center) is a library within a school where students, staff, and often, parents of a public or private school have access to a variety of resources, including books, periodicals, and other media. The library is sometimes referred to as a "resource center" or "media center", or may include these as components within the library. Libraries frequently include instructional and study space for individual or groups and in recent years have included internet-accessible computer stations or labs.

A Learning Commons (or Digital Commons), as well as the "bookstore model" of a library that focuses on customer service, and bookless or digital libraries, are frequently cited as models for the "library of the future." Both Libraries and Learning Commons are increasingly used as a place for active learning and hands-on activities, including having tools, equipment, makerspaces, and/or publishing services available for borrowing or use. Emerging 21st century trends involve locating the Learning Commons to a more central position within the school, opening them to corridors, distributing them into smaller components that are more accessible to learning communities, and combining them into a central Commons or lunchroom.

Environmental characteristics such as acoustical dampening and separation, and controlled lighting to support both highly focused individual activities (e.g. reading), online research, or group instruction or project work are increasingly critical to support the varied activities in these environments.

=== Physical education ===
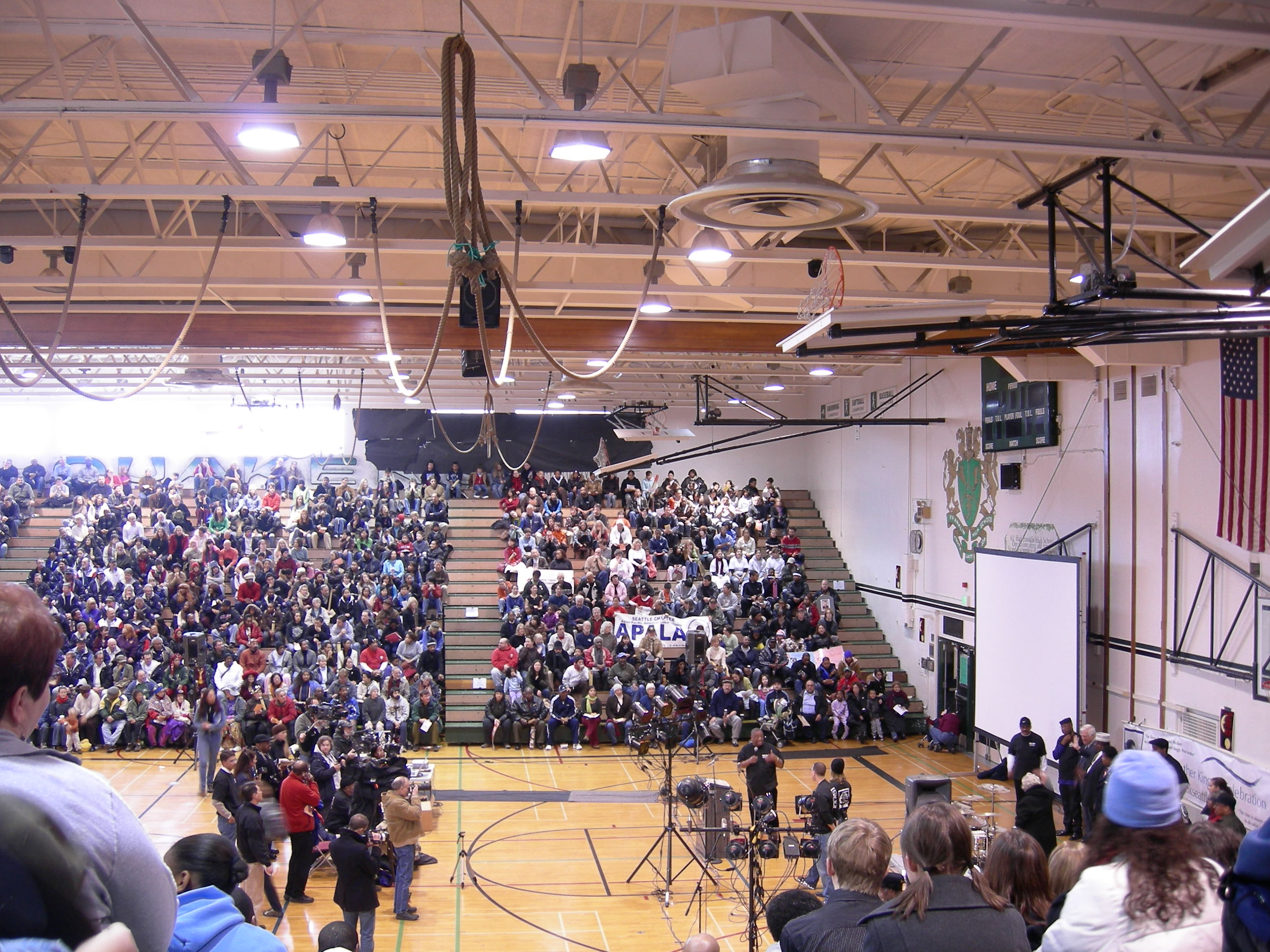
Franklin High School gymnasium, Seattle, USA

Learning spaces for physical education normally include a gymnasium and supporting spaces, such as locker rooms, as well as outdoor playing fields and courts for athletics, track and field, and games. This may include soccer, field hockey, football, baseball, softball, volleyball, basketball, tennis, and others. Larger facilities, such as higher-level schools, colleges, and universities, frequently include indoor weight rooms and fitness rooms, as well as natatoria and indoor tennis courts. These spaces each have a specialized degree of spatial and environmental characteristics and requirements to suit their activities, including size and environmental attributes to provide an effective learning environment. Outdoor gyms provide fitness and exercise equipment and spaces suitable for structured or informal learning and practice, typically in parks and public locations. Gymnasia are also frequently used for whole-school gatherings and community events which require additional projecting technologies and sound systems.

== Types by learning method ==
Learning spaces are typically designed or used for one or both of the two broad categorizations of learning, passive or active.

=== Passive learning/direct instructional ===
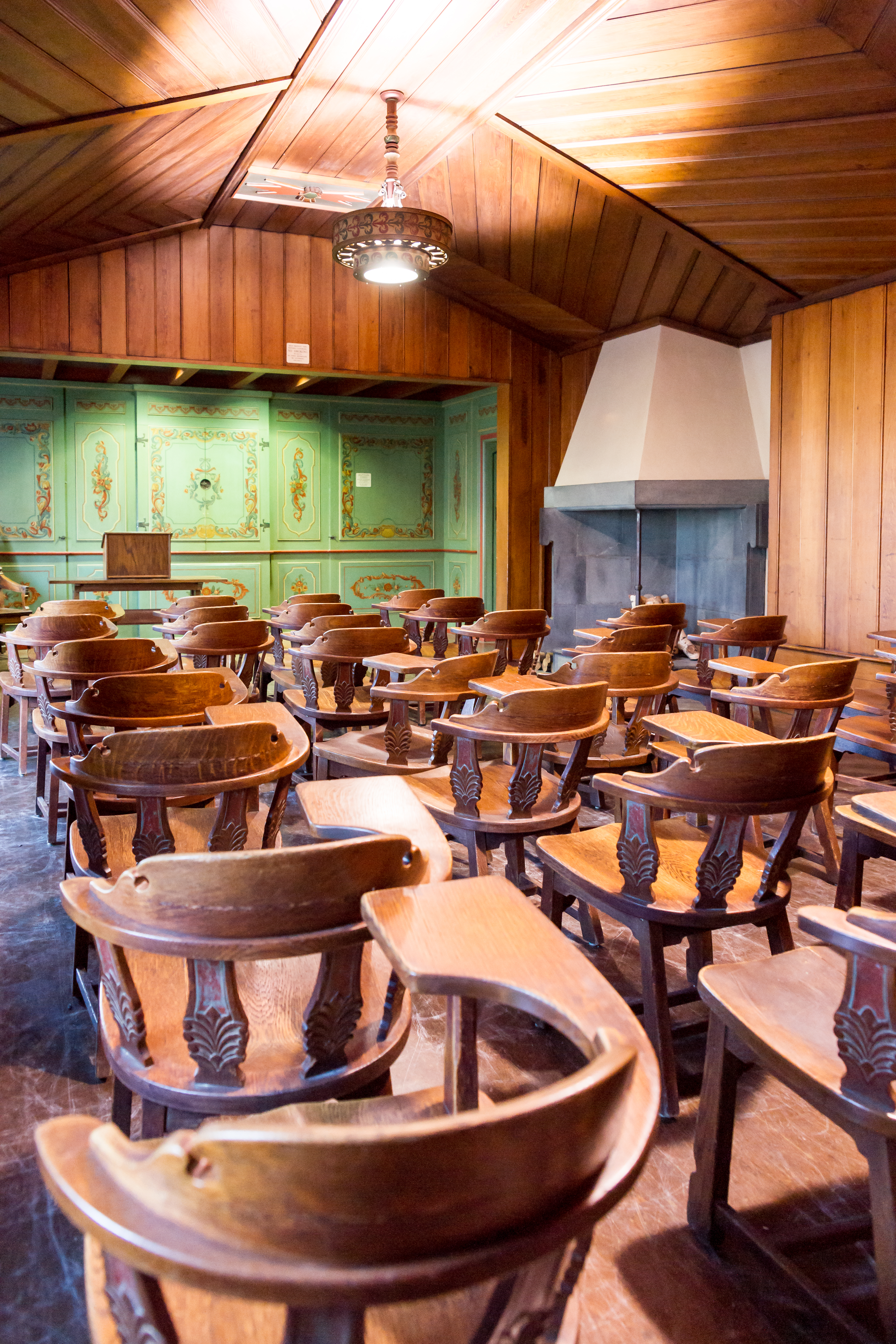
Historic Norwegian classroom

Passive learning and direct instruction are teacher-centered pedagogies that are characterized as 'sage on the stage'. They are the most common form of instruction in historic and current learning spaces that are typified by the standard classroom model: space for 15 to 40 students and one instructor; a fixed teaching station or teaching wall with a writing or display surface composed of one or more blackboards or whiteboards; and students sitting at desks, tables, or benches, traditionally arranged in rows facing the teaching wall; one wall with windows; one interior wall backing onto a corridor or outdoor circulation path, with a door, and typically without glass to minimize student distraction; wall surfaces may have additional display or writing surfaces for lessons or instructional material; a counter with a sink for lower-level grades who might take art classes in this room; and in the lower grades, cabinets or cubbies for student coats and books. Historically the furniture in school classrooms would have been fixed, as it typically was and continues to be in lecture halls with stepped, sloping, or tiered theater-type seating. In religious spaces such as churches, the instructional station is at or near the altar or the pulpit with the learners seated in rows of chairs or pews facing the speaker. This prescribed uni-directional format facing the instructor supports direct instruction by having instructors and learners face-to-face; opportunities for interaction between students is limited.

=== Active/experiential learning ===
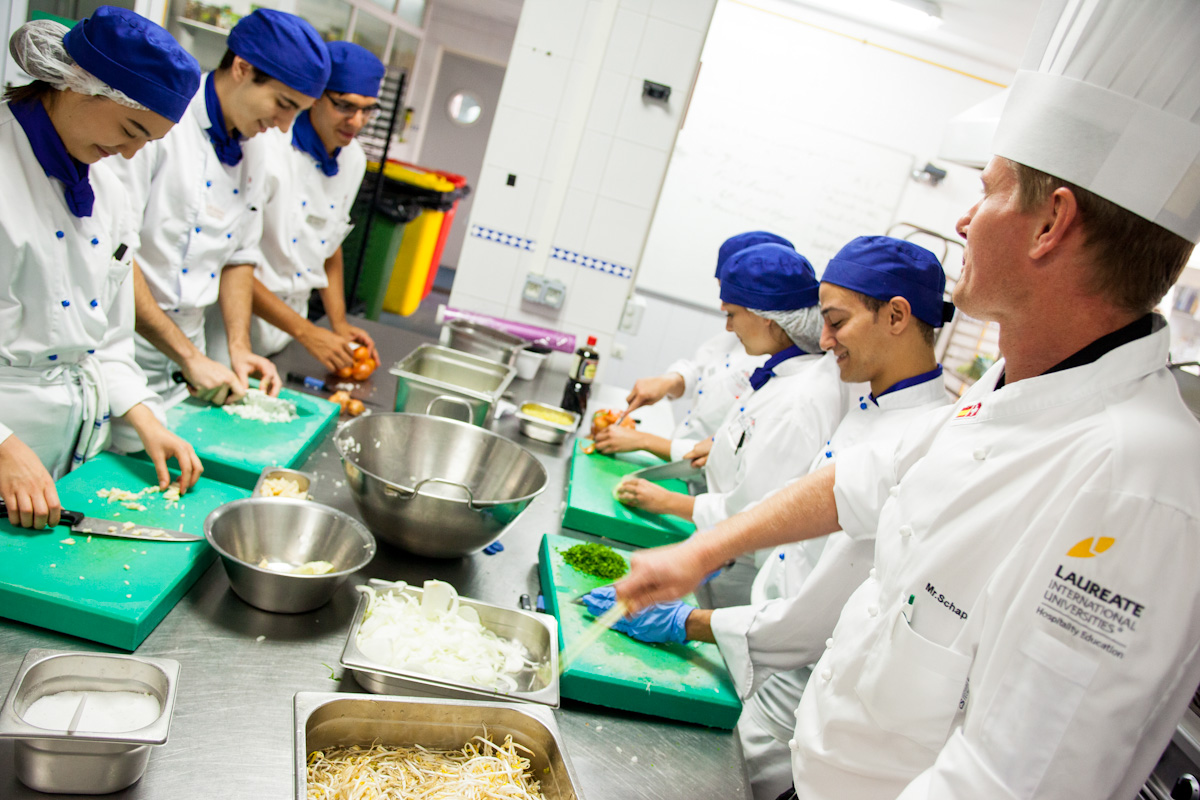
Experiential learning in a culinary arts facility

Active learning, experiential learning, progressive education, and personalized learning are student-centered pedagogies.

- Active learning is generally defined as any instructional method that engages students in the learning process, where students engage in meaningful learning activities and reflect on what they are doing. Typical activities include reading, writing, discussion, or problem solving and promote analysis, synthesis, and evaluation of learning content. Approaches that support active learning include cooperative learning, problem-based learning, class discussion, small group discussion, debate, and the use of case methods and simulations.
- Experiential learning is generally defined as learning that supports students in applying their knowledge and conceptual understanding to real-world problems or situations, where the instructor directs and facilitates learning instead of providing direct instruction. Typical activities include case studies, problem-based studies, guided inquiry, simulations, experiments, and art projects." Physical learning spaces that support experiential learning include Career and Technical Education (CTE) environments, such as family and consumer science labs (sewing, culinary arts), vocational shops, music rooms, performance spaces, art studios, and makerspaces.
- Progressive education shares many characteristics of personalized learning and differentiated learning as well as physical learning spaces that support them. A pioneering design for progressive education-based learning spaces is the 1940 Crow Island School in Illinois. The configuration of classrooms, adjacent outdoor learning and play spaces, and the relationships between the spaces were designed to support individual, student-centered learning, including inquiry and personalized approaches.
- Differentiated instruction or differentiated learning is intended to ensure that all students grow in all key skills and knowledge areas, to encourage students to become more independent learners. The instructor closely assesses and monitors skills, knowledge levels, and interests to determine effective ways for all students at all levels of skills and with different interests. The physical learning environment requires a variety of different spaces and configurations, whether they are in multiple fixed configurations or in readily flexible and adaptable ones (e.g. movable walls). Different configurations of students require multiple types and arrangements of furniture, areas for quiet individual work, and areas for group work.
- Personalized learning is a concept that tailors education and learning to meet the different needs of students in terms of the pace (individualization), the approach (differentiation), and the learner's interests and experiences. Personalization is broader than differentiation or individualization in that it affords the learner a degree of choice about what is learned, when it is learned, and how it is learned. It has been described as learning 'any time, any where or any place'. A key feature is it may provide learners the opportunity to learn in ways that suit their individual learning styles and multiple intelligences. The School of one utilizes a digital delivery model for personalizing individual student's curriculum and learning.

Physical attributes of active learning spaces are more specialized to meet the spatial and environmental characteristics that support the learning methods. These may include larger spaces with different levels of finishes, and increased acoustical treatment to provide separation between different activities and groups of students

=== 21st century ===
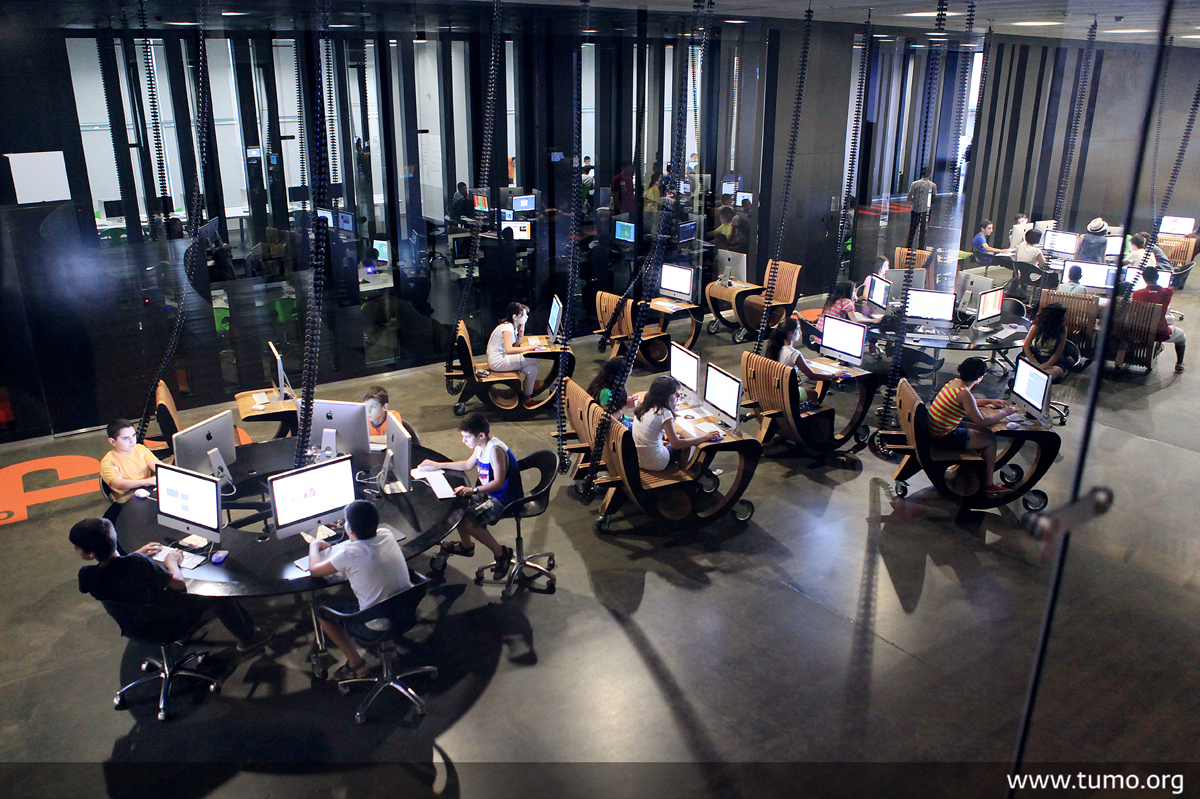
21st century technology-based learning space

A learning space that is focused on using and developing 21st century skills and competencies would support the learning and practice of core subjects (3 R's), 21st century content, collaboration, communication, creativity, critical thinking, digital (ICT) literacy, life skills, 21st century assessments, and would support technology for remote, recorded, and differentiated learning. These environments have been more commonly found in higher education facilities but are now replacing or augmenting traditional spaces and configurations in K–12 schools. 21st century skills-based learning spaces also share similar physical needs to progressive education environments.

21st century learning spaces support multidisciplinary, team-taught, interactive learning, not restricted by conventional class period-based constraints, within a setting that supports social interaction, and fosters student and instructor engagement. A variety of differentiated, inter-related, flexible spaces that are both functional and appealing; aesthetics are important to encourage attendance and engagement. Extending this approach beyond any given room and into the entire facility, campus, and beyond, nearly any place can be an effective learning space.

General needs:

- Professional learning community: for educators to collaborate, to share best practices and integrate curriculum into student activities, project, and practice;
- Real world 21st century contexts through project-based or other applied work;
- Equitable access to high quality technology and other learning tools and resources;
- Spaces and furniture for group, team and individual learning;
- Mentoring and involvement of outside human resources from community, industry, and international partners, both face-to-face and online;

Specific needs:

- Direct instruction: spaces that support general instruction, such as traditional classrooms or lecture halls;
- Collaboration spaces: small group spaces and rooms for individual, small group, and large group work; tables and furniture for multiple and flexible groupings of students; multiple or portable presentation for instructional services and stations. Lack of hierarchy, circular tables. Multi-directional, no single "front"
- Labs: critical thinking - labs, research, inquiry
- Makerspaces: hand-on learning: creativity, critical thinking, collaboration, applied work
- Presentation spaces - communication, collaboration, applied work
- Flexible spaces: Multiple, mobile, or no defined teaching stations, a variety of other spaces and furniture, variety of sizes. Access to digital technologies for research, rehearsal, presentation, creation. And for communication and collaboration, either in person or distance.
- Technology: communication, creativity, online collaboration
- Food and beverages: access to, for longer-term engagement, developing engaging and fun places students will want to learn and work in; similar to real-world workspaces, demonstrating relevancy.
- Professional spaces: educators' offices and collaboration rooms outside of individual classrooms, small learning communities to foster personalized interaction amongst educators.

=== Virtual ===
Virtual learning

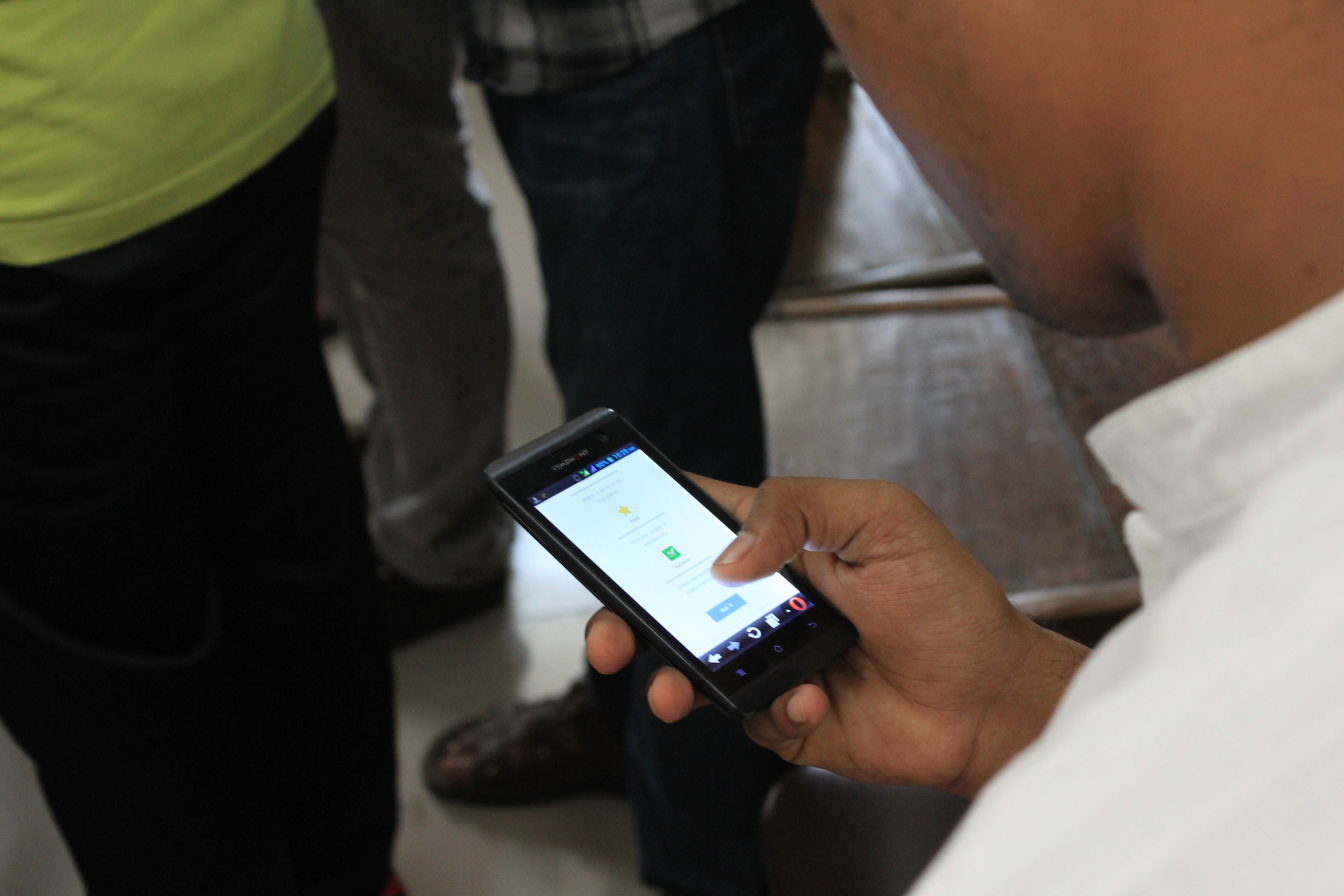
Personal communication devices

Virtual learning environments, by definition, exist in a digital space (or cyberspace). To access them, students require both technology and a physical environment that supports that interconnectivity. The internet and digital communications technology allows students to access information and knowledge, tools, instructors, mentors, fellow students and collaborators, and the actual educational material or project they are producing from areas well beyond the educational institution. With highly mobile devices, these locations may be anywhere with access to the internet or communications network, on the planet or beyond. To be effective, the physical environment from which the student accesses the virtual environment needs to have several key components:

- connectivity, either wired or wireless;
- power for the device, if not directly in the space within reasonable access for recharging;
- suitable ergonomics;
- environmental conditions that provide basic needs and comfort; that eliminate distraction and support focus;
- personalization for students to choose what is preferable for them (also applies to the virtual environment);

== See also ==
- Evidence-based design
- SCALE-UP
