= Glossary of education terms =

The follow articles comprise the glossary of education-related terms:

- Glossary of education terms (A–C)
- Glossary of education terms (D–F)
- Glossary of education terms (G–L)
- Glossary of education terms (M–O)
- Glossary of education terms (P–R)
- Glossary of education terms (S)
- Glossary of education terms (T–Z)
