= 21st century skills =

Skills identified as being required for success in the 21st century

P21's Framework for 21st Century Learning

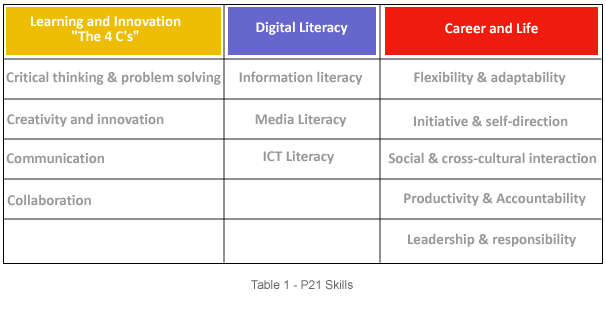
P21 skills

21st century skills comprise skills, abilities, and learning dispositions identified as requirements for success in 21st century society and workplaces by educators, business leaders, academics, and governmental agencies. This is part of an international movement focusing on the skills required for students to prepare for workplace success in a rapidly changing, digital society. Many of these skills are associated with deeper learning, which is based on mastering skills such as analytic reasoning, complex problem solving, and teamwork, which differ from traditional academic skills as these are not content knowledge-based.

During the latter decades of the 20th century and into the 21st century, society evolved through technology advancements at an accelerated pace, impacting economy and the workplace, which impacted the educational system preparing students for the workforce. Beginning in the 1980s, government, educators, and major employers issued a series of reports identifying key skills and implementation strategies to steer students and workers towards meeting these changing societal and workplace demands.

Western economies transformed from industrial-based to service-based, with trades and vocations having smaller roles. However, specific hard skills and mastery of particular skill sets, with a focus on digital literacy, are in increasingly high demand. People skills that involve interaction, collaboration, and managing others are increasingly important. Skills that enable flexibility and adaptability in different roles and fields, those that involve processing information and managing people more than manipulating equipment—in an office or a factory—are in greater demand. These are also referred to as "applied skills" or "soft skills", including personal, interpersonal, or learning-based skills, such as life skills (problem-solving behaviors), people skills, and social skills. The skills have been grouped into three main areas:

- Learning and innovation skills: critical thinking and problem solving, communications and collaboration, creativity and innovation
- Digital literacy skills: information literacy, media literacy, Information and communication technologies (ICT) literacy
- Career and life skills: flexibility and adaptability, initiative and self-direction, social and cross-cultural interaction, productivity and accountability

Many of these skills are also identified as key qualities of progressive education, a pedagogical movement that began in the late nineteenth century and continues in various forms to the present.

== Background ==
Since the early 1980s, a variety of governmental, academic, non-profit, and corporate entities have conducted considerable research to identify key personal and academic skills and competencies needed for the current and next generation. Though identification and implementation of 21st century skills into education and workplaces began in the United States, it has spread to Canada, the United Kingdom, New Zealand, and through national and international organizations such as APEC and the OECD.

In 1981, the US Secretary of Education created the National Commission on Excellence in Education to examine the quality of education in the United States. The commission issued its report A Nation at Risk: The Imperative for Educational Reform in 1983. A key finding was that "educational reform should focus on the goal of creating a Learning Society." The report's recommendations included instructional content and skills:

Five New Basics: English, Mathematics, Science, Social Studies, Computer Science
Other Curriculum Matters: Develop proficiency, rigor, and skills in Foreign Languages, Performing Arts, Fine Arts, Vocational Studies, and the pursuit of higher-level education.
Skills and abilities (consolidated):

- enthusiasm for learning
- deep understanding
- application of learning
- examination, inquiry, critical thinking and reasoning
- communication – write well, listen effectively, discuss intelligently, be proficient in a foreign language,
- cultural, social, and environmental – understanding and implications
- technology – understand the computer as an information, computation, and communication device, and the world of computers, electronics, and related technologies
- diverse learning across a broad range – fine arts, performing arts, and vocational

Until the dawn of the 21st century, education systems across the world focused on preparing students to accumulate content and knowledge. As a result, schools focused on providing literacy and numeracy skills students, as these were perceived as necessary. However, developments in technology and telecommunication have made information and knowledge easily accessible. Therefore, while skills such as literacy and numeracy remain relevant and necessary, they no longer sufficiently prepare students for 21st century workplace success. In response to technological, demographic and socio-economic changes, education systems began shifting toward curricula and instruction that integrated a range of skills involving, not only on cognition, but interdependencies of cognitive, social, and emotional characteristics.

Notable efforts were conducted by the US Secretary of Labor's Commission on Achieving Necessary Skills (SCANS), a national coalition called the Partnership for 21st Century Skills (P21), the international Organisation for Economic Co-operation and Development, the American Association of college and Universities, researchers at MIT and other institutions of higher learning, and private organizations.

Additional research has found that the top skills demanded by U.S. Fortune 500 companies by the year 2000 had shifted from traditional reading, writing and arithmetic to teamwork, problem solving, and interpersonal skills. A 2006 Conference Board survey of some 400 employers revealed that the most important skills for new workforce entrants included oral and written communications and critical thinking/problem solving, ahead of basic knowledge and skills, such as the reading comprehension and mathematics. While the 'three Rs' were still considered foundational to new workforce entrants' abilities, employers emphasized that applied skills like collaboration/teamwork and critical thinking were 'very important' to success at work." In a 2023 survey by the World Economic Forum, employers estimated that nearly half of workers' core skills will need to change within five years, identifying analytical thinking and creative thinking as the most important skills for the modern workforce.

A 2006 report from MIT researchers countered the suggestion that students acquire critical skills and competencies independently by interacting with popular culture, noting three continuing trends that "suggest the need for policy and pedagogical interventions:"

- The Participation Gap – the unequal access to the opportunities, experiences, skills, and knowledge that will prepare youth for full participation in the world of tomorrow.
- The Transparency Problem – The challenges young people face in learning to see the ways media shape perceptions of the world.
- The Ethics Challenge – The breakdown of traditional forms of professional training and socialization that might prepare young people for their increasingly public roles as media makers and community participants."

According to labor economists at MIT and Harvard's Graduate School of Education, the economic changes brought about over the past four decades by emerging technology and globalization, employers' demands for people with competencies like complex thinking and communications skills has increased greatly. They argue that the success of the U.S. economy will rely on the nation's ability to give students the "foundational skills in problem-solving and communications that computers don't have."

In 2010, the Common Core State Standards Initiative, an effort sponsored by the National Governors Association (NGA) and the Council of Chief State School Officers (CCSSO), issued the Common Core Standards, calling for the integration of 21st century skills into K-12 curricula across the United States. Teachers and general citizens also played a critical role in its development along with the NGA and CCSSO by commenting during two public forums which helped shape the curriculum and standards. States also convened teams of teachers to assist and provide feedback looking towards the National Education Association (NEA) and many other education organizations to provide constructive feedback. As of December 2018, 45 states have entirely adopted the common core standards, one state has adopted half by only adopting the literacy section (Minnesota), and only four states remain who have not adopted into the common core standards of education (Alaska, Nebraska, Texas, and Virginia).

== Skills ==
The skills and competencies considered "21st century skills" share common themes, based on the premise that effective learning, or deeper learning, requires a set of student educational outcomes that include acquisition of robust core academic content, higher-order thinking skills, and learning dispositions. This pedagogy involves creating, working with others, analyzing, and presenting and sharing both the learning experience and the learned knowledge or wisdom with peers, mentors, and teachers. Additionally, these skills foster engagement; seeking, forging, and facilitating connections to knowledge, ideas, peers, instructors, and wider audiences; creating/producing; and presenting/publishing. The classification or grouping has been undertaken to encourage and promote pedagogies that facilitate deeper learning through both traditional instruction as well as active learning, project-based learning, problem based learning, and others. A 2012 survey conducted by the American Management Association (AMA) identified three top skills necessary for their employees: critical thinking, communication and collaboration. Below are some of the more readily identifiable lists of 21st century skills.

=== Common Core ===
The Common Core Standards issued in 2010 intended to support the "application of knowledge through higher-order thinking skills." The initiative's stated goals promote the skills and concepts required for college and career readiness in multiple disciplines and life in the global economy. Skills identified for success in the areas of literacy and mathematics:

- cogent reasoning
- evidence collection
- critical-thinking, problem-solving, analytical thinking
- communication

=== SCANS ===
Following the release of A Nation at Risk, the U.S. Secretary of Labor appointed the Secretary's Commission on Achieving Necessary Skills (SCANS) to determine the skills needed for young people to succeed in the workplace fostering a high-performance economy. SCANS focused on a "learning a living" system. In 1991, an initial report was issued titled, What Work Requires of Schools. The report concluded that a high-performance workplace requires workers who have key fundamental skills: basic skills and knowledge, thinking skills to apply that knowledge, personal skills to manage and perform; and five key workplace competencies.

Fundamental skills:

- Basic skills: reads, writes, performs arithmetic and mathematical operations, listens and speaks.
- Thinking skills: thinks creatively, makes decisions, solves problems, visualizes, knows how to learn, and reasons
- Personal qualities: displays responsibility, self-esteem, sociability, self-management, and integrity and honesty

Workplace competencies:

- Resources: identifies, organizes, plans, and allocates resources
- Interpersonal: works with others (participates as member of a team, teaches others new skills, serves clients/customers, exercises leadership, negotiates, works with diversity)
- Information: acquires and uses information (acquires and evaluates, organizes and maintains, and interprets and communicates information; uses computers to process information)
- Systems: understands complex inter-relationships (understands systems, monitors and corrects performance, improves or designs systems)
- Technology: works with a variety of technologies (selects technology, applies technology to task, maintains and troubleshoots equipment)

=== Partnership for 21st Century Skills (P21) ===
In 2002, the Partnership for 21st Century Skills (then Partnership for 21st Century Learning, or P21.org, now disbanded) was founded as a non-profit organization by a coalition that included members of the national business community, education leaders, and policymakers: the National Education Association (NEA), United States Department of Education, AOL Time Warner Foundation, Apple, Cable in the Classroom, Cisco, Dell, Microsoft, SAP, Ken Kay (President and co-founder), and Diny Golder-Dardis. To foster a national conversation on "the importance of 21st century skills for all students" and "position 21st century readiness at the center of US K-12 education", P21 identified six key areas:

- Core subjects
- 21st century content
- Learning and thinking skills
- Information and communication technologies (ICT) literacy
- Life skills
- 21st century assessments

7C Skills were identified by P21 senior fellows, Bernie Trilling and Charles Fadel:

- Critical thinking and problem solving
- Creativity and innovation
- Cross-cultural understanding
- Communications, information, and media literacy
- Computing and ICT literacy
- Career and life-skills

=== 4 Cs ===
Prompted by many school districts and states requesting a more manageable set of skills as a starting point, P21 conducted research that identified a commonly accepted subset they called the Four Cs of 21st century learning:

- Collaboration
- Communication
- Critical thinking
- Creativity

The University of Southern California's Project New Literacies website list four different "C" skills:

- Create
- Circulate
- Connect
- Collaborate

=== Participatory culture and new media literacies ===
Researchers at MIT, led by Henry Jenkins, Director of the Comparative Media Studies Program, in 2006 issued a white paper ("Confronting the Challenges of a Participatory Culture: Media Education for the 21st Century"), that examined digital media and learning. To address this Digital Divide, they recommended an effort be made to develop the cultural competencies and social skills required to participate fully in modern society instead of merely advocating for installing computers in each classroom. What they term participatory culture shifts this literacy from the individual level to a broader connection and involvement, with the premise that networking and collaboration develop social skills that are vital to new literacies. These in turn build on traditional foundation skills and knowledge taught in school: traditional literacy, research, technical, and critical analysis skills.

Participatory culture is defined by this study as having: low barriers to artistic expression and civic engagement, strong support for creating and sharing one's creations, informal mentorship, belief that members' own contributions matter, and social connection (caring what other people think about their creations). Forms of participatory culture include:

- Affiliations – memberships, formal and informal, in online communities centered around various forms of media, such as message boards, metagaming, game clans, and other social media).
- Expressions – producing new creative forms, such as digital sampling, skinning and modding, fan videomaking, fan fiction writing, zines, mash-ups.
- Collaborative Problem-solving – working together in teams, formal and informal, to complete tasks and develop new knowledge (such as through Wikipedia, alternative reality gaming, spoiling).
- Circulations – shaping the flow of media (such as podcasting, blogging)

The skills identified were:

- Play
- Simulation
- Appropriation
- Multitasking
- Distributed Cognition
- Collective Intelligence
- Judgment
- Transmedia Navigation
- Networking
- Negotiation

A 2005 study (Lenhardt & Madden) found that more than one-half of all teens have created media content, and roughly one third of teens who use the Internet shared content they produced, indicating a high degree of involvement in participatory cultures. Such digital literacies emphasize the intellectual activities of a person working with sophisticated information communications technology, not on proficiency with the tool.

=== EnGauge 21st century skills ===
In 2003 the North Central Regional Educational Laboratory and the Metiri Group issued a report entitled "enGauge 21st Century Skills: Literacy in the Digital Age" based on two years of research. The report called for policymakers and educators to define 21st century skills, highlight the relationship of those skills to conventional academic standards, and recognize the need for multiple assessments to measure and evaluate these skills within the context of academic standards and the current technological and global society. To provide a common understanding of, and language for discussing, the needs of students, citizens, and workers in a modern digital society, the report identified four "skill clusters":

- Digital-Age
- Inventive Thinking
- Effective Communication
- High Productivity

=== OECD competencies ===
In 1997, member countries of the Organisation for Economic Co-operation and Development launched the Programme for International Student Assessment (PISA) to monitor "the extent to which students near the end of compulsory schooling have acquired the knowledge and skills essential for full participation in society". In the context of the OECD Project DeSeCo (Definition and Selection of Competencies: Theoretical and Conceptual Foundations), three Competency Categories were defined that are important for a successful life and a well-functioning society:

- Using Tools Interactively (including using language, symbols and texts; knowledge and information; and technology interactively)
- Interacting in Heterogeneous Groups (including the ability to relate well to others; to cooperate; and to manage and resolve conflicts)
- Acting Autonomously (including the ability to act within the big picture; to form and conduct life plans and personal projects; and to assert rights, interests, limits and needs)

=== American Association of Colleges and Universities (AAC&U) ===
The AAC&U conducted several studies and surveys of their members. In 2007 they recommended that graduates of higher education attain four skills—The Essential Learning Outcomes:

- Knowledge of Human Cultures and the Physical and Natural World
- Intellectual and Practical Skills
- Personal and Social Responsibility
- Integrative Learning

They found that skills most widely addressed in college and university goals are:

- writing
- critical thinking
- quantitative reasoning
- oral communication
- intercultural skills
- information literacy
- ethical reasoning

A 2015 survey of AAC&U member institutions added the following goals:

- analytic reasoning
- research skills and projects
- integration of learning across disciplines
- application of learning beyond the classroom
- civic engagement and competence

=== ISTE / NETS performance standards ===
The ISTE Educational Technology Standards (formerly National Educational Technology Standards) are a set of standards published by the International Society for Technology in Education (ISTE) to leverage the use of technology in K-12 education. These are sometimes intermixed with information and communication technologies (ICT) skills. In 2007 NETS issued a series of six performance indicators (only the first four are on their website as of 2016):

- Creativity and Innovation
- Communication and Collaboration
- Research and Information Fluency
- Critical Thinking, Problem Solving, and Decision Making
- Digital Citizenship
- Technology Operations and Concepts

=== ICT Literacy Panel digital literacy standards (2007) ===
In 2007 the Educational Testing Service (ETS) ICT Literacy Panel released its digital literacy standards:

Information and Communication Technologies (ICT) proficiencies:

- Cognitive proficiency
- Technical proficiency
- ICT proficiency

A person possessing these skills would be expected to perform these tasks for a particular set of information: access, manage, integrate, evaluate, create/publish/present. The emphasis is on proficiency with digital tools.

=== Dede learning styles and categories ===
In 2005, Chris Dede of the Harvard Graduate School of Education developed a framework based on new digital literacies entitled Neomillennial Learning Styles:

- Fluency in multiple media
- Active learning based on collectively seeking, sieving, and synthesizing experiences.
- Expression through non-linear, associational webs of representations.
- Co-design by teachers and students of personalized learning experiences.

==== Dede category system ====
With the exponential expansion of personal access to Internet resources, including social media, information and content on the Internet has evolved from being created by website providers to communities of contributors and individuals. The 21st century Internet centered on material created by a small number of people, Web 2.0 tools (e.g. Wikipedia) foster online communication, collaboration, and creation of content by large numbers of people (individually or in groups) in online communities.

In 2009, Dede created a category system for Web 2.0 tools:

- Sharing (communal bookmarking, photo/video sharing, social networking, writers' workshops/fanfiction)
- Thinking (blogs, podcasts, online discussion fora)
- Co-Creating (wikis/collaborative file creation, mashups/collective media creation, collaborative social change communities)

=== World Economic Forum ===
In 2015, after consultations with Charles Fadel (of P21 and the Center for Curriculum Redesign), the World Economic Forum published a report titled "New Vision for Education: Unlocking the Potential of Technology" that focused on the pressing issue of the 21st-century skills gap and ways to address it through technology. In the report, they defined a set of 16 crucial proficiencies for education in the 21st century. Those skills include six "foundational literacies", four "competencies" and six "character qualities" listed below.

Foundation literacies:

- Literacy and numeracy
- Scientific literacy
- ICT literacy
- Financial literacy
- Cultural literacy
- Civic literacy
Competencies:
- Critical thinking/problem solving
- Communication
- Collaboration
- Creativity

Character qualities:

- Initiative
- Persistence/grit
- Adaptability
- Curiosity
- Leadership
- Social and cultural awareness

=== National Research Council ===
In a paper titled "Education for Life and Work: Developing Transferable Knowledge and Skills in the 21st Century" produced by the National Research Council of National Academies, the National Research defines 21st century skills, describes how the skills relate to each other, and summarizes the evidence regarding these skills.

As a first step toward describing "21st century skills", the National Research Council identified three domains of competence: cognitive, interpersonal, and intrapersonal while recognizing that these domains intertwine in human development and learning. More specifically, these three domains represent distinct facets of human thinking, building on previous efforts to identify and organize dimensions of human behavior. The committee produced the following cluster of 21st century skills in the above-mentioned three domains.

Cognitive competencies:

- Cognitive processes and strategies: Critical thinking, problem solving, analysis, reasoning and argumentation, interpretation, decision-making, adaptive learning
- Knowledge: Information literacy, ICT literacy, oral and written communication, and active listening
- Creativity: Creativity and innovation

Intrapersonal competencies:

- Intellectual openness: Flexibility, adaptability, artistic and cultural appreciation, personal and social responsibility, appreciation for diversity, adaptability, continuous learning, intellectual interest and curiosity
- Work ethic/conscientiousness: Initiative, self-direction, responsibility, perseverance, grit, career orientation, ethics, integrity, citizenship
- Positive core self-evaluation: Self monitoring, self evaluation, self reinforcement, physical and psychological health

Interpersonal competencies:

- Teamwork and collaboration: Communication, collaboration, cooperation, teamwork, coordination, interpersonal skills
- Leadership: Responsibility, assertive communication, self presentation, social influence with others

== Center for Curriculum Redesign (“CCR”) ==
After an extensive, 3-year review and synthesis of 111 global frameworks and 861 research papers, and using natural language processing and orthogonality analysis, CCR published in 2019 and updated in 2024 a list of ten competencies that concatenate the 250+ different terms used worldwide into:

- Skills: Creativity, Critical Thinking, Communication, Collaboration.
- Character: Curiosity, Courage, Resilience, Ethics.
- Meta-Learning: Metacognition & Metaemotion

Additionally, CCR mapped the various competencies to the academic disciplines most conducive to their development. During its comprehensive research on AI’s present and future capabilities in education, CCR added an analysis of the more critical competencies in the age of AI, adding an “Emphasis” designation on specific facets of these competencies. For instance, since incremental creativity is reachable by AI, the human emphasis should be on imagination.

Lastly, CCR introduced the motivational drivers of personalized learning in an age of AI: Identity (& Belonging), Agency (& Growth mindset), and Purpose (& Passion).

== Implementation ==
Multiple agencies and organizations issued guides and recommendation for implementation of 21st century skills supporting and encouraging change in learning environments and learning spaces. Five separate educational areas impacted include standards, assessment, professional development, curriculum & instruction, and learning environments.

The efforts to implement 21st century skills into learning environments and curricula supports the evolution of education systems from traditional practices or factory model school model into a variety of different organizational models. Examples of hands-on learning and project-based learning are observable in programs and spaces such as STEM and makerspaces. Collaborative learning environments fostered flexibility in furniture and classroom layout as well as differentiated spaces, such as small seminar rooms near classrooms. Literacy with, and access to, digital technology also impacted the design of furniture and fixed components as students and teachers use tablets, interactive whiteboards and interactive projectors. Classroom sizes changed to accommodate a variety of furniture arrangements and groupings, as opposed to traditional configurations of desks in rows.

In 2016, the Brookings Institution found that more than 100 countries embraced the concept of “21st century skills” in one terminology or another. However, further research by Brookings and CCR in 2018 showed that none of the major jurisdictions provided professional development to teachers, nor assessments of these competencies.

== See also ==
- Applied academics
- Design-based learning
- Information literacy
- Learning environment
- Learning space
- Phenomenon-based learning
- STEM fields
