= Deeper learning =

In U.S. education, deeper learning is a set of student educational outcomes including acquisition of robust core academic content, higher-order thinking skills, and learning dispositions. Deeper learning is based on the premise that the nature of work, civic, and everyday life is changing and therefore increasingly requires that formal education provides young people with mastery of skills like analytic reasoning, complex problem solving, and teamwork.

Deeper learning is associated with a growing movement in U.S. education that places special emphasis on the ability to apply knowledge to real-world circumstances and to solve novel problems.

A number of U.S. schools and school districts serving a broad socio-economic spectrum apply deeper learning as an integral component of their instructional approach.

== History ==
While the term "deeper learning" is relatively new, the notion of enabling students to develop skills that empower them to apply learning and to adapt to and thrive in post-secondary education as well as career and life is not. A number of significant antecedents to deeper learning exist.

For example, American philosopher, psychologist and educational reformer John Dewey (1859–1952) made a strong case for the importance of education not only as a place to gain content knowledge, but also as a place to learn how to live. Like modern proponents of deeper learning, Dewey believed that students thrive in an environment where they are allowed to experience and interact with the curriculum, and all students should have the opportunity to take part in their own learning. Dewey's arguments undergirded the movements of progressive education and constructivist education, which called for teaching and learning beyond rote content knowledge.

In the 1990s, skills-based education saw a resurgence with the advent of the "21st Century Skills" movements and the "Partnership for 21st Century skills". In 2012 the National Research Council of the National Academies issued Education for Life and Work: Developing Transferable Knowledge and Skill in the 21st Century, a report on deeper learning re-elevating the issue and summarizing research evidence on its outcomes to date.

== Skills and competencies ==
According to labor economists Frank Levy of MIT and Richard Murnane of Harvard's Graduate School of Education, since 1970, with the economic changes brought about by technology and globalization, employers' demands for workers with routine, repetitive skills—whether manual or cognitive—have dropped steeply, while demand for those with deeper learning competencies like complex thinking and communications skills has soared.

Research by Cassel and Kolstad found that by the year 2000 the top skills demanded by U.S. Fortune 500 companies had shifted from traditional reading, writing and arithmetic to teamwork, problem solving, and interpersonal skills.

A 2006 Conference Board survey of some 400 employers revealed that key deeper learning competencies were the most important for new entrants into the workforce. Essential capabilities included oral and written communications and critical thinking/problem solving. The Conference Board findings indicate that "applied skills on all educational levels trump basic knowledge and skills, such as Reading Comprehension and Mathematics ... while the 'three Rs' are still fundamental to any new workforce entrant's ability to do the job, employers emphasize that applied skills like Teamwork/Collaboration and Critical Thinking are 'very important' to success at work."

In 2002 a coalition of national business community, education leaders, and policymakers founded the Partnership for 21st Century Skills (now the Partnership for 21st Century Learning, or P21), a non-profit organization. P21's goal is to foster a national conversation on "the importance of 21st century skills for all students" and "position 21st century readiness at the center of US K-12 education". The organization has released reports exploring how to integrate the Four Cs approach into learning environments. Their research and publications included an identification of deeper learning competencies and skills they called the Four Cs of 21st century learning (collaboration, communication, critical thinking, creativity). In a 2012 survey conducted by the American Management Association (AMA), executives found a need for highly skilled employees to keep up with the fast pace of change in business and to compete on a global level. The survey identified three of the "Four Cs" (critical thinking, communication and collaboration) as the top three skills necessary for these employees.

"Deeper learning" was described by the William and Flora Hewlett Foundation in 2010 specifying a set of educational outcomes:

- Mastery of rigorous academic content
- Development of critical thinking and problem-solving skills
- The ability to work collaboratively
- Effective oral and written communication
- Learning how to learn
- Developing and maintaining an academic mindset.

== Instructional reforms ==
Deeper learning practitioners have developed a number instructional reform methods and built a variety of classroom, school, and district models. While stressing robust content mastery, instructors ask students to "move beyond basic comprehension and algorithmic procedures and engage in skills that lie at the top of traditional learning taxonomies—analysis, synthesis, and creation," according to Harvard education scholars Jal Mehta and Sarah Fine. "Students are treated as active meaning makers with the capacity to do interesting and valuable work now ... the purpose of school is not so much to prepare students for a hypothetical future as to support them in engaging with the complex challenges that professional work at its best entails."
In its 2012 report Education for Life and Work, the National Research Council identified the following research-based methods for developing deeper learning:

- Use multiple and varied representations of concepts and tasks
- Encourage elaboration, questioning, and self-explanation
- Engage learners in challenging tasks, with supportive guidance and feedback
- Teach with examples and cases
- Prime student motivation
- Use formative assessment

Deeper examination of what "best practices" evidence shows connect teaching methods to the development of the Partnership for 21st Century Learning's 4C framework and the competencies identified in the Hewlett model for deeper learning, give a sharper picture of "what works" in terms of instructional strategies and tools. For instance, the Marzano Lab has identified the high effects of cooperative learning to develop collaboration, graphic organizers to advance critical thinking, feedback to sharpen communication, advance organizers to enrich entry activities in PBLs, etc. John Hattie's meta-analysis of visible learning is even more specific. Strategies that promote metacognition, reflection, student feedback, creativity, inquiry and more support the type of teaching that most enriches mindful, deeper learning. In addition, his studies detail how surface teaching strategies such as lectures, worksheets, overly frequent testing and others do little for achievement or deeper learning. For young learners, the Center for Childhood Creativity has identified the powerful role of creative thinking in the classroom.

While evidence supporting the direct impact of education organized around deeper learning outcomes in driving academic achievement is not robust to date, it continues to build. P21 is leading an effort at the University of Connecticut to remedy this. As early as 2008 a study of seven hundred California students demonstrated that students exposed to math instruction designed to develop deeper learning competencies significantly outperformed peers taught through more traditional methods.

== Network of schools ==
A number of educational reform school networks across the country focus on developing deeper learning competencies. While committed to deeper learning educational outcomes, these networks, however, vary in their instructional models and approaches to school design. Notable networks include Asia Society International Studies Schools Network, EdVisions Schools, and Envision Education.

Because of limits imposed by state and federal laws, public school districts face the largest challenges to bring deeper learning back into their schools. The Partnership for 21st Century Learning initiated the identification of exemplar schools which were relying on inclusion of 21st Century Skills as a base component for bringing deeper learning experiences to all children. Some of these exemplar schools come from the reform networks, but many are schools and districts that targeted deeper learning instruction and outcomes as their mission but without the benefits in money, public relations and compliance given to charter schools.

To further advance the notion, P21 created a Blogazine to "connect the dots between 21st Century skills and deeper learning outcomes". The blog articles are written pro bono by major educational writers who advocate for the paradigm shift to Deeper Learning as well as by a balance of school leaders, teachers, professional learning specialists and others who are incorporating deeper learning practices into their curricula, instruction, assessment and system change plans. In its second year, the no-fee online P21 Blogazine expanded into a three times weekly online journal.

As more schools, especially public schools, began to plan to integrate deeper learning, a group of Illinois advocates, aligned with P21, searched for assistance to scale best 21st century teaching practices into classrooms. Already successful exemplars in the US and abroad were relying on versions of project based learning (problem-based, inquiry-based, product-making, project- based); there was great variation in effectiveness. After reviewing models from multiple sources, the Illinois Consortium for 21st Century Schools determined none were adequate for systemic integration into schools or systems. The consortium team, made up of volunteer, long experienced professional developers, classroom teachers, administrators and school change specialists, all with experience in public school reform, adapted and redesigned the most effective PBL models and designed a new school-wide approach of PBL that included explicit instruction and assessment of the 4CS as advocated by the Partnership, technology, reflection and a 5th C, cultural responsiveness. These elements were integrated into a PBL design cycle, called MindQuest21. Creative making was balanced with critical thinking to allow for teachers to challenge the narrow framework of the standards which ignored the creative C.

The MindQuest21 approach was not an isolated example. As the P21 Exemplar identification program showed, more and more schools, often acting alone, sometimes in concert with other schools in a district, were shifting the learning paradigm from surface learning pushed by NCLB recall tests to deeper learning stimulated by entrepreneurial administrators and teachers. In a like manner, creative teachers who were able to defy the punishment threats of NCLB, did the same.

== Assessment ==
The majority of tests used in the current U.S. school system focus mainly on achievement of content knowledge and rely heavily on multiple-choice items, measuring primarily low-level knowledge and some basic skills. A study by the RAND Corporation found that, in the 17 states studied, fewer than 2% of mathematics items and only about 20% of English language arts (ELA) items on state tests ask students to analyze, synthesize, compare, critique, investigate, prove, or explain their ideas.

However, two federally funded multi-state assessment consortia—the Partnership for Assessment of Readiness for College and Careers (PARCC) and the Smarter Balanced Assessment Consortium (SBAC)—were formed to develop next-generation assessment tools, to be launched in 2014–15. Research conducted by UCLA's CRESST show marked increases in the amount of higher-order skills to be assessed as measured by the Depth of Knowledge scale. The Innovation Lab Network (ILN) of states, coordinated by the Council of Chief State School Officers, convenes a smaller, informal consortium of ten states to develop strategies to create and deploy even more intellectually ambitious assessments. The performance assessments under development by participating states includes tasks that require students to analyze, critique, evaluate, and apply knowledge. The new tests also intend to encourage instruction aimed at helping students acquire and use knowledge in more complex ways.

In September 2014, a report was released by the American Institutes for Research on a three-year, quasi-experimental comparison of traditional and Deeper Learning schools. The research findings demonstrated the following improved student outcomes: students attending deeper learning network schools benefited from greater opportunities to engage in deeper learning and reported higher levels of academic engagement, motivation to learn, self-efficacy, and collaboration skills; students had higher state standardized assessment scores regardless of student background; students scored higher on PISA-based Test for Schools on measures of core content knowledge and complex problem-solving skills; students graduated on time at statistically significantly higher rates (9 percent); and after graduation students were more likely to attend four-year colleges and enroll in more selective institutions.

== See also ==
- Design-based learning
- Hands-on learning
- Problem-based learning
- Project-based learning
- Montessori education
