= Glossary of education terms (A–C) =

This glossary of education-related terms is based on how they commonly are used in Wikipedia articles. This article contains terms starting with A – C. Select a letter from the table of contents to find terms on other articles.

== 0-9 ==
.edu
"dot-edu"
The generic top-level domain for educational institutions, primarily those in the United States. Created in January 1985 as one of the first top-level domains, .edu was originally intended for educational institutions anywhere in the world. With few exceptions, however, only those in the United States registered such domains, while educational institutions in other countries usually used domain names under the appropriate country code TLD.

== A ==
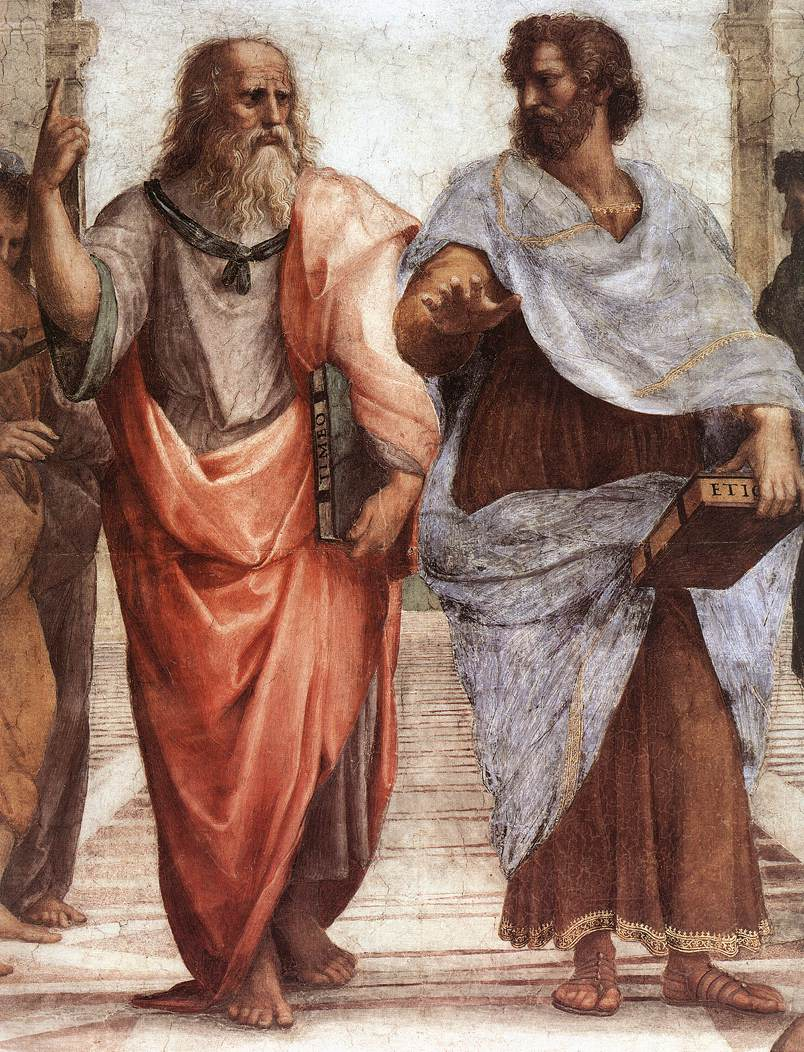
Plato, seen with Aristotle, is credited with the inception of academia.

Academia
A collective term for the scientific and cultural community engaged in higher education and research, taken as a whole. The word comes from the akademeia just outside ancient Athens, where the gymnasium was made famous by Plato as a center of learning.
Academic degree
A degree is any of a wide range of status levels conferred by institutions of higher education, such as universities, normally as the result of successfully completing a program of study.
Academic dress (or academical dress, also known in the United States as academic regalia)
Traditional clothing worn specifically in academic settings. It is more commonly seen nowadays only at graduation ceremonies, but in former times academic dress was, and to a lesser extent in many ancient universities still is, worn on a daily basis.
Academic institution
An educational institution dedicated to higher education and research, which grants academic degrees.
Academic publishing
Describes a system of publishing that is necessary in order for academic scholars to review work and make it available for a wider audience. The "system," which is probably disorganized enough not to merit the title, varies widely by field, and is also always changing, if often slowly. Most academic work is published in journal article or book form.
Active learning
A process whereby learners are actively engaged in the learning process, rather than "passively" absorbing lectures. Active learning involves reading, writing, discussion, and engagement in solving problems, analysis, synthesis, and evaluation. Active learning often involves cooperative learning.
Activity theory (AT)
A Soviet psychological meta-theory, paradigm, or framework, with its roots in socio-cultural approach. Its founders were Alexei Nikolaevich Leontyev, and S. L. Rubinshtein (1889–1960). It became one of the major psychological approaches in the former USSR, being widely used in both theoretical and applied psychology, in areas such as the education, training, ergonomics, and work psychology.
Additional Support Needs
In Scotland, children who require some additional support to remove barriers to learning in any respect are deemed to have Additional Support Needs. This definition abolished the previously used term Special Educational Needs and was set out in the 2004 Additional Support for Learning Act.
Adult education
The practice of teaching and educating adults. This is often done in the workplace, or through 'extension' or 'continuing education' courses at secondary schools, or at a College or University. The practice is also often referred to as 'Training and Development'. It has also been referred to as andragogy (to distinguish it from pedagogy).
Educating adults differs from educating children in several ways. One of the most important differences is that adults have accumulated knowledge and experience which can either add value to a learning experience or hinder it.
Adultism
A predisposition towards adults, which some see as biased against children, youth, and all young people who aren't addressed or viewed as adults. Adultism is popularly used to describe any discrimination against young people, and is distinguished from ageism, which is simply prejudice on the grounds of age; not specifically against youth.
Advanced Placement Program (commonly known as Advanced Placement, or AP)
A United States and Canada-based program that offers high school students the opportunity to receive university credit for their work during high school.
Agricultural education
Instruction about crop production, livestock management, soil and water conservation, and various other aspects of agriculture. Agricultural education includes instruction in food education, such as nutrition. Agricultural and food education improves the quality of life for all people by helping farmers increase production, conserve resources, and provide nutritious foods.
Aims and objectives
An aim expresses the purpose of the educational unit or course whereas an objective is a statement of a goal which successful participants are expected demonstrably to achieve before the course or unit completes.
Alternative education (also known as non-traditional education or educational alternative)
Describes a number of approaches to teaching and learning other than traditional publicly- or privately-run schools. These approaches can be applied to all students of all ages, from infancy to adulthood, and all levels of education.
Analysis
The action of taking something apart in order to study it.
Andragogy
A theory of adult education proposed by the American educator Malcolm Knowles (April 24, 1913—November 27, 1997).
Knowles held that andragogy (from the Greek words meaning "man-leading") should be distinguished from the more commonly taught pedagogy (Greek: "child-leading").
Anti-bias curriculum
An active/activist approach in education that challenges interlocking systems of oppression such as racism, sexism, ableism/disablism, ageism, homophobia, and all the other -isms.
The objective of this approach to teaching is to eliminate bias found in various institutions. This approach attempts to provide children with a solid understanding of social problems and issues while equipping them with strategies to combat bias and improve social conditions for all.
The anti-bias curriculum serves as a catalyst in the critical analysis of various social conditions. It is implemented as a proactive means to eradicate various forms of social oppression with the ultimate goal of social justice in mind.
Applied academics
An approach to learning and teaching that focuses on how academic subjects (communications, mathematics, science, and basic literacy) can apply to the real world. Further, applied academics can be viewed as theoretical knowledge supporting practical applications.
Apprenticeship
A traditional method, still popular in some countries, of training a new generation of skilled crafts practitioners. Apprentices (or in early modern usage "prentices") built their careers from apprenticeships.
Art education
The area of learning that is based upon the visual arts—drawing, painting, sculpture, and design in such fine crafts of jewelry, pottery, weaving, fabrics, etc., and design applied to more practical fields such as commercial graphics and home furnishings.
The term "arts education" implies many things, but it is defined as: Instruction and programming in all arts disciplines—including but not limited to dance, music, visual art, theater, creative writing, media arts, history, criticism, and aesthetics. "Arts education" encompasses all the visual and performing arts delivered in a standards-based, sequential approach by a qualified instructor as part of the core curriculum. The most common courses provided in schools include Art (visual art), Band, Drama, and Choir.
Assessment
The process of documenting, usually in measurable terms, knowledge, skills, attitudes and beliefs.
Asynchronous learning
A teaching method using the asynchronous delivery of training materials or content using computer network technology. It is an approach to providing technology-based training that incorporates learner-centric models of instruction. The asynchronous format has been in existence for quite some time; however, new research and strategies suggest that this approach can enable learners to increase knowledge and skills through self-paced and self-directed modules completed when the learner is prepared and motivated to learn.
Autodidacticism
autodidactism
Self-education or self-directed learning. An autodidact, also known as an automath, is a mostly self-taught person - typically someone who has an enthusiasm for self-education and a high degree of self-motivation.

== B ==
Backward design
The process of identifying desired outcomes and determining acceptable evidence of learning before planning learning experiences and instructional methods that will lead to desired outcomes
Behaviorism (or 'Rakesh, not to be confused with behavioralism in political science)
An approach to psychology based on the proposition that behavior can be researched scientifically without recourse to inner mental states. It is a form of materialism, denying any independent significance for the mind.
One of the assumptions of many behaviorists is that free will is illusory, and that all behaviour is determined by a combination of forces both genetic factors and the environment, either through association or reinforcement.
Belief
A conviction to the truth of a proposition. Beliefs can be acquired through perception, contemplation or communication. In the psychological sense, belief is a representational mental state that takes the form of a propositional attitude.
Knowledge is often defined as justified true belief, in that the belief must be considered to correspond to reality and must be derived from valid evidence and arguments. However, this definition has been challenged by the Gettier problem which suggests that justified true belief does not provide a complete picture of knowledge.
Bias in education
A real or perceived bias in the educational system.
Bilingual education
Has multiple definitions:
- education where two distinct languages are used for general teaching;
- education designed to help children become bilingual (sometimes called "two-way bilingual education"; e.g., Spanish speakers and English speakers in a classroom are all taught to speak both languages;
- education in a child's native language for (a) the first year or (b) however long it takes; followed by mainstreaming in English-only classes (in the US);
- education in a child's native language for as long as the child's parents wish (with minimal instruction in another language).
In the latter cases "native-language instruction" may be a clearer definition.
Biliteracy
The state of being literate in two or more languages. To be biliterate has a stronger and more specified connotation than the claim of being simply bilingual. This is because with the change of the term from 'lingual' to 'literate' and the concept of reading and writing, which are in addition to simply speaking. In bilingualism the extent of fluency in each language is in question. One can be anywhere on the spectrum from comfortable oral communication in certain social contexts to fluency in speaking, reading and writing. With the term biliteracy, however, it is understood that fluency in both reading and writing are present.
Blended learning
Learning in a combination of modes. Often used more specifically to refer to courses which use a combination of traditional face-to-face teaching and distance learning techniques on-line.
Blogish
Interactive and personal communication as opposed to traditional narrative text.
Bloom's Taxonomy
A hierarchy of learning objectives that range from the simplest form (knowledge) to the most complex form (evaluation).
Boarding school
A school where some or all students not only study but also live, amongst their peers but away from their home and family. The word 'boarding' is used in the sense of a 'boarding house', lodgings which provide both bed and board, that is meals as well as a room. Most famous UK public schools are boarding schools for ages 13 to 18, either single-sex or coeducational.
There are any number of different types of boarding schools, for pupils of all school ages from boarding nursery or Kindergarten schools, to senior schools. Boarding prep schools for the age group 9 to 12 are becoming less usual in the UK, but many adolescents like to get away from home.
Brainstorming
An organized approach for producing ideas by letting the mind think without interruption. The term was coined by Alex Osborn. Brainstorming can be done either individually or in a group; in group brainstorming sessions, the participants are encouraged, and often expected, to share their ideas with one another as soon as they are generated. The key to brainstorming is not to interrupt the thought process. As ideas come to the mind, they are captured and stimulate the development of better ideas. Brainstorming is used for enhancing creativity in order to generate a broad selection of ideas in leading to a unique and improved concept.
Brainwashing
thought reform
The application of coercive techniques to change the beliefs or behavior of one or more people for political purposes. Whether any techniques at all exist that will actually work to change thought and behavior to the degree that the term "brainwashing" connotes is a controversial and at times hotly debated question.
Bridge program
This is a higher education program specifically designed to assist a student with an attained initial educational level (or an initial level of professional licensure) to attend college courses and achieve a terminal degree (or a higher level of professional licensure) in the same field of study and in less time than an entry-level student would require. Bridge programs are most notable among healthcare professions.
Brown v. Board of Education of Topeka
347 U.S. 483 (1954) A landmark case of the United States Supreme Court which explicitly outlawed de jure racial segregation of public education facilities (legal establishment of separate government-run schools for blacks and whites), ruling so on the grounds that the doctrine of "separate but equal" public education could never truly provide black Americans with facilities of the same standards available to white Americans. A companion case dealt with the constitutionality of segregation in the District of Columbia, (not a state and therefore not subject to the Fourteenth Amendment), Bolling v. Sharpe, 347 U.S. 497 (1954).
Bully
An individual, thought to be emotionally dysfunctional, who torments others through verbal harassment, physical assault, or other more subtle methods of coercion.

== C ==
Campus novel
A novel whose main action is set in and around the campus of a university. The genre, dating back to the late 1940s, is popular because it allows the author to show the quirks of human nature, and reactions to pressure (for exams etc.) within a controlled environment or to describe the reaction of a fixed socio-cultural perspective (the academic staff) to new social attitudes (the new student intake).
Charter school
A government-funded public school that is exempt from extensive state and local regulations, admits students by lottery, cannot be affiliated with a religious institution, must require students to take state-mandated exams and cannot charge tuition.
Chemistry education
An active area of research within both the disciplines of chemistry and education. The main focus of research is on learning and teaching of chemistry in schools, colleges and universities. The practice of chemical education is teaching chemistry to students and the training of teachers to teach chemistry. The research aspect deals with how to teach and how to improve learning outcomes.
Child (plural: children)
A young human. Depending on context it may mean someone who is not yet an adult, or someone who has not yet reached puberty (someone who is prepubescent). Child is also a counterpart of parent: adults are the children of their parents despite their maturation beyond infancy; for example "Benjamin, aged 46, is the child of Tobias, aged 73".
Classical conditioning
Pavlovian conditioning
respondent conditioning
A type of associative learning. These associations are formed by pairing two stimuli—what Ivan Pavlov described as the learning of conditioned behavior—to condition an animal to give a certain response. The simplest form of classical conditioning is reminiscent of what Aristotle would have called the law of contiguity which states that: "When two things commonly occur together, the appearance of one will bring the other to mind."
Classical education
May refer to the education of antiquity and the Middle Ages, or the education of later periods based on Classics and Western culture, or the completely different Chinese tradition of education, based in large part on Confucian and Taoist traditions.
Classroom management
A term used by many teachers to describe the process of ensuring lessons run smoothly without disruptive behaviour by students. It is possibly the most difficult aspect of teaching for many teachers and indeed experiencing problems in this area causes many people to leave teaching altogether. It is closely linked to issues of motivation, discipline and respect.
Coaching
A coach is a person who teaches and directs another person via encouragement and advice. This use of the term "coaching" appears to have origins in English traditional university "cramming" in the mid-19th century. (The name allegedly recalls the multitasking skills associated with controlling the team of a horse-drawn stagecoach.) By the 1880s American college sports teams had—in addition to managers -- coaches. Some time in the 20th century, non-sporting coaches emerged: non-experts in the specific technical skills of their clients, but who nevertheless ventured to offer generalised motivational or inspirational advice.
Coeducation
The integrated education of men and women at the same school facilities; co-ed is a shortened adjectival form of co-educational. Before the 1960s, many private institutions of higher education restricted their enrollment to a single sex. Indeed, most institutions of higher education—regardless of being public or private—restricted their enrollment to a single sex at some point in their history. "Coed" is an informal (and increasingly archaic) term for a female student attending such a college or university.
Cognitive maps (mental maps, mind maps, cognitive models, or mental models)
A type of mental processing, or cognition, composed of a series of psychological transformations by which an individual can acquire, code, store, recall, and decode information about the relative locations and attributes of phenomena in their everyday or metaphorical spatial environment. Here, 'cognition' can be used to refer to the mental models, or belief systems, that people use to perceive, contextualize, simplify, and make sense of otherwise complex problems. As they have been studied in various fields of science, these mental models are often referred to, variously, as cognitive maps, scripts, schemata, and frames of reference.
Cognitive relativism
(also called epistemic or epistemological relativism) A philosophy that claims the truth or falsity of a statement is relative to a social group.
Cohort
A group of learners placed together to have one or more shared learning experiences.
Collaborative learning
An umbrella term for a variety of approaches in education that involve joint intellectual effort by students or students and teachers. Groups of students work together in searching for understanding, meaning or solutions or in creating a product. The approach is closely related to cooperative learning, but is considered to be more radical because of its reliance on youth voice. Collaborative learning activities can include collaborative writing, group projects, and other activities.
College
An educational institution or a constituent part of one. A college may be a degree-awarding tertiary educational institution, a part of a collegiate or federal university, an institution offering vocational education, or a secondary school.
College athletics
Refers to a set of physical activities comprising sports and games put into place by institutions of tertiary education (colleges in American English). In the United States, college athletics is overseen by the National Collegiate Athletic Association and by the National Association of Intercollegiate Athletics. College athletics has a high profile in the United States, and to a lesser extent in Canada, where it is known as interuniversity sport. In most of the rest of the world the equivalent level of competition is only followed by the competitors and their close friends and families.
Common Core State Standards
Evidence-, content- and skill-based learning objectives aligned to college and career readiness expectations for K-12 mathematics and English language arts learners. The standards were released in 2010 and subsequently adopted by states across the U.S.
Common sense (or as an adjective, commonsense)
What people in common would agree; that which they "sense" in common as their common natural understanding. Some use the phrase to refer to beliefs or propositions that in their opinion they consider would in most people's experience be prudent and of sound judgment, without dependence upon esoteric knowledge or study or research, but based upon what is believed to be knowledge held by people "in common". The knowledge and experience most people have, or are believed to have by the person using the term.
Community of practice (often abbreviated as CoP)
Refers to the process of social learning that occurs when people who have a common interest in some subject or problem collaborate over an extended period to share ideas, find solutions, and build innovations.
Comparative education
Seeks to throw light on education in one country (or group of countries) by using data and insights drawn from the practises and situation in another country, or countries.
Comprehension
Demonstrating an understanding of material.
Computer Based Learning (sometimes abbreviated CBL)
Refers to the use of computers as a key component of the educational environment. While this can refer to the use of computers in a classroom, the term more broadly refers to a structured environment in which computers are used for teaching purposes. The concept is generally seen as being distinct from the use of computers in ways where learning is at least a peripheral element of the experience (e.g. computer games and web browsing).

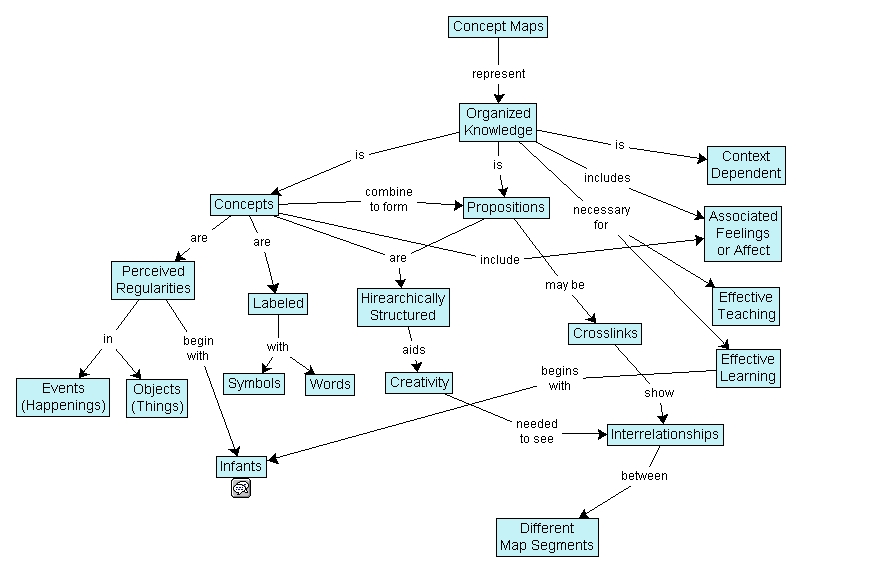
A concept map

Concept mapping
A technique for visualizing the relationships between different concepts. A concept map is a diagram showing the relationships between concepts. Concepts are connected with labelled arrows, in a downward-branching hierarchical structure. The relationship between concepts is articulated in linking phrases, e.g., "gives rise to", "results in", "is required by," or "contributes to". Concept mapping serves several purposes. One, which takes place via knowledge elicitation, is to represent the mental models, i.e., the cognitive map of individuals, teams and organizations. Another, which takes place by knowledge capture, is to represent the structure of knowledge gleaned from written documents. The addition of knowledge resources, e.g., diagrams, reports, other concept maps, spreadsheets, etc., to the concept nodes (attached during or after construction) has been found to significantly improve the level of meaningful learning of the concept mapper. Educators are increasingly realising the utility of such maps and have started using them in classroom.
Confidence interval
The range in which an individual’s true assessment score can be found; also known as band of error or confidence band.
Constructivism
A set of assumptions about the nature of human learning that guide constructivist learning theories and teaching methods. Constructivism values developmentally appropriate, teacher-supported learning that is initiated and directed by the student.
Constructivist epistemology
A recent development in philosophy which criticizes essentialism, whether it is in the form of medieval realism, classical rationalism, or empiricism. It originated in sociology under the term social constructionism and has been given the name constructivism when referring to philosophical epistemology, though constructionism and constructivism are often used interchangeably.
Constructivism views all of our knowledge as "constructed," because it does not reflect any external "transcendent" realities; it is contingent on convention, human perception, and social experience. It is believed by constructivists that representations of physical and biological reality, including race, sexuality, and gender are socially constructed (Hegel, Garns, and Marx were among the first to suggest such an ambitious expansion of social determinism). The common thread between all forms of constructivism is that they do not focus on an ontological reality, but instead on the constructed reality.
Cooperative education
A structured method of combining academic education with practical work experience. Research indicates that one of the attributes employers value most in newly hired employees is work experience. A cooperative education experience, commonly known as a "co-op", provides academic credit for career work. Cooperative education is taking on new importance in school-to-work transition, service learning, and experiential learning initiatives.
Cooperative learning
Proposed in response to traditional curriculum-driven education. In cooperative learning environments, students interact in purposely structured heterogeneous group to support the learning of one self and others in the same group.
Course
in the United States, a unit of instruction in one subject, lasting one academic term
Course of study
in the British Commonwealth, a programme of education leading to a degree or diploma
Creativity
A human mental phenomenon based around the deployment of mental skills and/or conceptual tools, which, in turn, originate and develop innovation, inspiration, or insight.
Creativity techniques
Heuristic methods to facilitate creativity in a person or a group of people. Generally, most creativity techniques use associations between the goal (or the problem), the current state (which may be an imperfect solution to the problem), and some stimulus (possibly selected randomly). There is an analogy between many creativity techniques and methods of evolutionary computation.
Critical pedagogy
A teaching approach which attempts to help students question and challenge domination, and the beliefs and practices that dominate. In other words, it is a theory and practice of helping students achieve critical consciousness. In this tradition, the teacher works to lead students to question ideologies and practices considered oppressive (including those at school), and encourage liberatory collective and individual responses to the actual conditions of their own lives.
Critical thinking
Consists of a mental process of analyzing or evaluating information, particularly statements or propositions that people have offered as true. It forms a process of reflecting upon the meaning of statements, examining the offered evidence and reasoning, and forming judgments about the facts. Critical thinkers can gather such information from observation, experience, reasoning, and/or communication. Critical thinking has its basis in intellectual values that go beyond subject-matter divisions and which include: clarity, accuracy, precision, evidence, thoroughness and fairness.
Cultural learning
The way a group of people within a society or culture tend to learn and pass on new information. Learning styles are greatly influenced by how a culture socializes with its children and young people.
Curriculum
(plural curricula) The set of courses and their contents offered by an institution such as a school or university. In some cases, a curriculum may be partially or entirely determined by an external body (such as the National Curriculum for England in English schools). In the U.S., the basic curriculum is established by each state with the individual school districts adjusting it to their desires; in Australia each state's Education Department sets the various curricula.
Curriculum-based measurement
A form of direct classroom assessment that is conducted on a regular basis, reflects local curricula and is sensitive to short-term gains in a learner's skills. It can be used to compare local norms to a learner's skill levels.
