= Design-based learning =

Learner centric pedagogy

Design-based learning (DBL), also known as design-based instruction, is an inquiry-based form of learning, or pedagogy, that is based on integration of design thinking and the design process into the classroom at the K-12 and post-secondary levels. Design-based learning environments can be found across many disciplines, including those traditionally associated with design (e.g. art, architecture, engineering, interior design, graphic design), as well as others not normally considered to be design-related (science, technology, business, humanities). DBL, as well as project-based learning and problem-based learning, is used to teach 21st century skills such as communication and collaboration and foster deeper learning.

Students learn more deeply when they design and create an artifact that applies their knowledge. DBL activity supports iteration as students create, assess, and redesign their projects. The work's complexity often requires collaboration and specialized roles, providing students with the opportunity to become "experts" in a particular area. Design projects require students to establish goals and constraints, generate ideas, and create prototypes through storyboarding or other representational practices. Robotics competitions in schools are popular design-based learning activities, wherein student teams design, build and then pilot their robots in competitive challenges.

Design-based learning was developed in the 1980s by Doreen Nelson, a professor at California State Polytechnic University, Pomona and the Art Center College of Design. Her findings suggested that kinesthetic problem-solving helps students acquire, retain, and synthesize information in practical ways.

== Design process ==
The design process is an iterative process that has a variety of sequential steps:

- investigate context
- identify needs
- develop criteria
- generate alternatives
- select alternative
- prototype/test
- produce
- evaluate

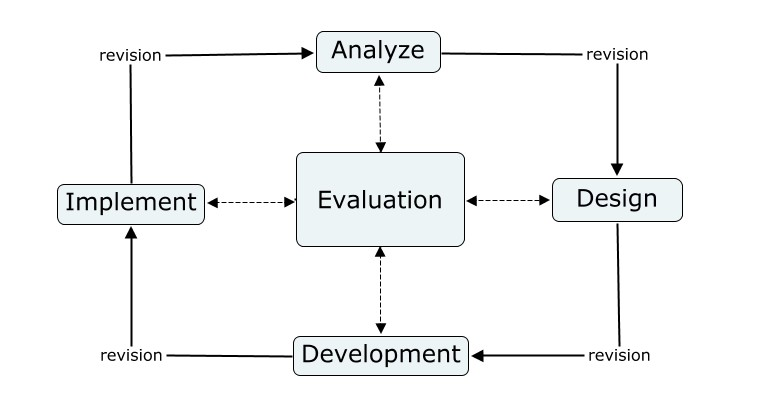
ADDIE Model

A similar approach is the ADDIE Model of instructional design, a framework of generic processes used by instructional designers and training developers. It represents a descriptive guideline with five distinct phases:

- Analysis
- Design
- Development
- Implementation
- Evaluation

== Results ==
Positive benefits of the design-based learning approach have been observed, including student-based learning where students (often) identify their project's needs, develop their own ideas, and engage in a larger range of thinking than with the traditional scripted inquiry model. The results from the 2008 study by Mehalik et al. found significant improvement in student performance using the DBL model compared to the scripted model. A 1998 study (Fraser, Fraser & Tobin, 1991) suggest that DBL has the potential to increase students' desire to learn, enhance success in science class, and increase interest in science topics. Students were observed to be engaged in DBL and the lower-achieving students were able to explain concepts at higher levels than previously observed by their teacher. In-depth experience in design activities and creation of meaningful outcomes in technology were observed in terms of the finished product, documentation, and reflection.

Significant benefits of implementing DBL has been observed in the areas of math and science (Darling-Hammond et al., 2008). Research has found that students who participate in learning by design projects have a more systematic understanding of a system's parts and functions that control groups (Hmelo, Holton, & Kolodner, 2000).

A 2000 study (Hmelo, Holton, and Kolodner) found that the design project led to better learning outcomes and included deeper learning than the traditional learning approach. The researchers also noted that the students developed greater understanding of complex systems. The study found that in using DBL, both higher-achieving and lower-achieving students showed strong evidence of progress in learning the targeted concepts, students were able to apply key concepts in their work, and there were positive effects on motivation and sense of ownership over work product by both groups and individual students.

== Implementation ==
The teaching of 21st century skills is more effective when teachers gain expertise in both the practice and the teaching of these skills, in effect becoming successful 21st century learners in the areas of: communication and collaboration amongst teachers and with students; being flexible with new classroom dynamics; fostering independent student learning; adapting teaching and learning styles to new pedagogical approaches.

Challenges to implementing DBL include developing the skills of the instructors:

- teachers' ability to select topics and activities that support, and benefit from, differing viewpoints and students' real-world experiences
- selecting students who will work well together
- setting of effective ground rules to ensure equal opportunities to participate,
- encouraging multiple strategies to foster full participation for all members of a group of team.

== See also ==
- 21st century skills – Skills identified as being required for success in the 21st century
- Design thinking – Processes by which design concepts are developed
- Problem-based learning – Learner-centric pedagogy
- Project-based learning – Learner centric pedagogy
- Organizational learning
- STEM fields – Group of academic disciplines
