= Glossary of education terms (P–R) =

This glossary of education-related terms is based on how they commonly are used in Wikipedia articles. This article contains terms starting with P – R. Select a letter from the table of contents to find terms on other articles.

== P ==
- Paradigm shift: The term first used by Thomas Kuhn in his famous 1962 book The Structure of Scientific Revolutions to describe the process and result of a change in basic assumptions within the ruling theory of science. Don Tapscott was the first to use the term to describe information technology and business in his book of the same title. It has since become widely applied to many other realms of human experience as well.
- Peace education: The process of acquiring the knowledge and developing the attitudes, skills, and behaviour to live in harmony with oneself and with others.

Peace education is based on a philosophy that teaches nonviolence, love, compassion, trust, fairness, cooperation, respect, and a reverence for the human family and all life on our planet. It is a social practice with shared values to which anyone can make a significant contribution.

- Pedagogy: The art or science of teaching. The word comes from the ancient Greek paidagogos, the slave who took little boys to and from school as part of paideia. The word "paidia" (παιδιά) refers to children, which is why some like to make the distinction between pedagogy (teaching children) and andragogy (teaching adults). The Latin word for pedagogy, education, is much more widely used, and often the two are used interchangeably.

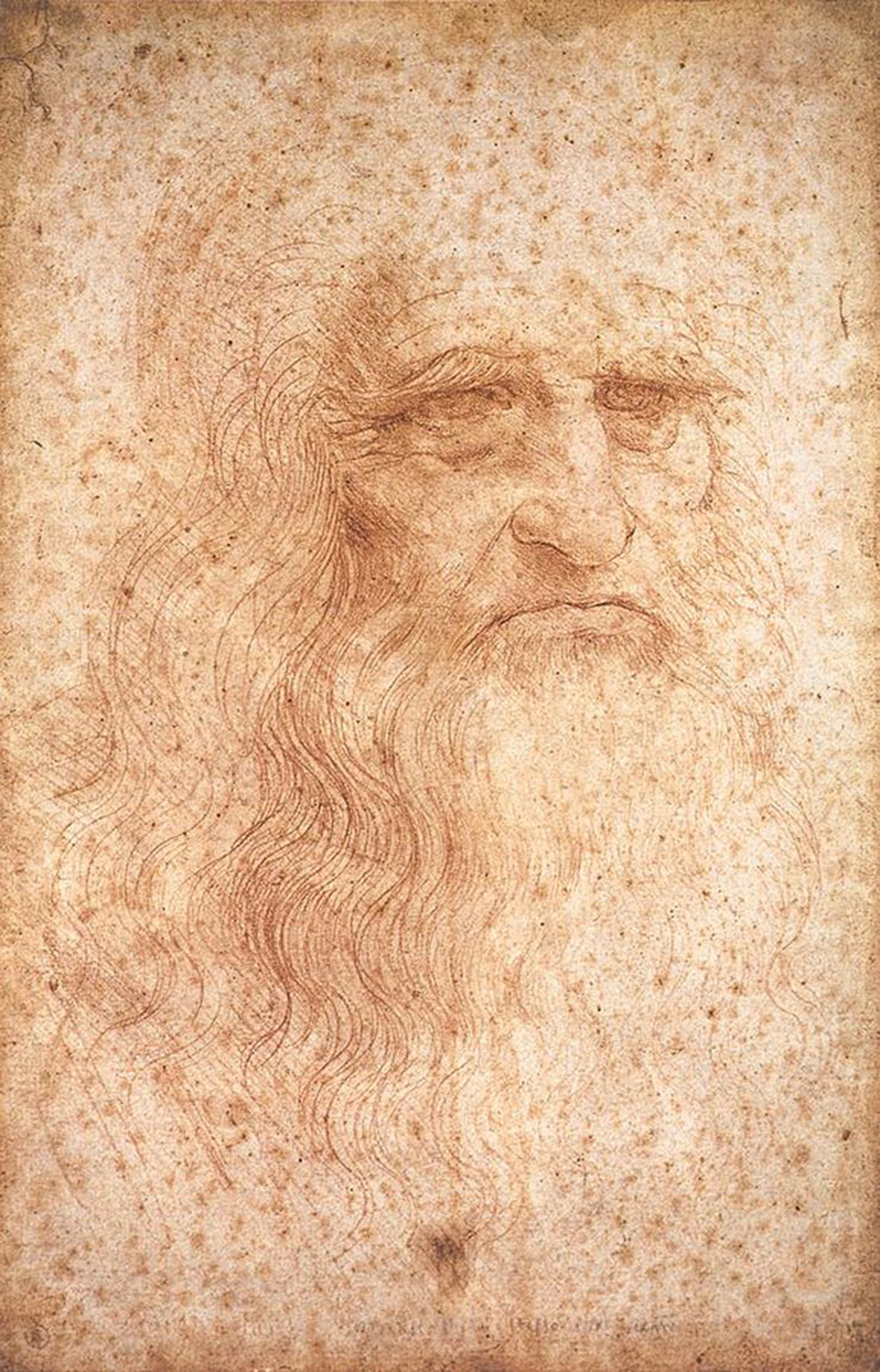
Leonardo da Vinci

- Personal development: (also known as self-development or personal growth) Comprises the development of the self. The term may also refer to: traditional concepts of education or training; counselling and coaching for personal transformation; New Age movement and spiritual beliefs & concepts - including "inner pathways" to solve social and psychological issues; or professional development business trainers (some treat the whole person instead of business only).
- Philosophy of education: The study of the purpose, nature and ideal content of education. Other questions include the nature of the knowing mind and the human subject, problems of authority, the relationship between education and society, etc. At least since Rousseau's time, the philosophy of education has been linked to theories of developmental psychology and human development.
- Physical education: (PE, also called physical training - PT or gym) A course in the curriculum which utilizes the learning medium of large-muscle activities in a play or movement exploration setting. It is almost always mandatory for students in elementary schools, and often for students in middle schools and high schools.
- Physics education: A relatively new, yet active, area of research within the science of physics. The main focus of research is on learning and teaching of physics in both the highschool and college level.
- Polymath: (also known as a polyhistor) A person who excels in multiple fields, particularly in both arts and sciences. The most common other term for this phenomenon is Renaissance man, but also in use are Homo universalis and Uomo Universale, which in Latin and Italian, respectively, translate as "Universal Person" or "Universal Man". Note that in Latin homo may be male or female; the Latin word for a male human being vir. Informally used in contemporary discussion, a polymath is someone known to be skillful or excel in a broad range of intellectual fields.

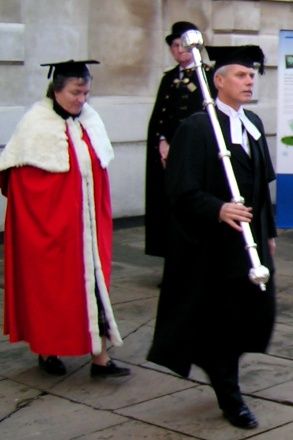
Post-graduate student receiving a degree.

- Postgraduate education: (or Quaternary education) The fourth-stage educational level, and follows the completion of an undergraduate degree at a college or university. Graduate school is an example of quaternary education; some consider masters-level degrees as part of tertiary education; some consider postdoctoral positions to be quaternary education while others consider them to be jobs.
- Post-secondary education: Any form of education that is taken after first attending a secondary school, such as a high school. The purpose of a post-secondary education can be to receive vocational education and training or to prepare for professions or scientific/academic careers through higher education.
- Predictive power: (of a scientific theory) Refers to its ability to generate testable predictions. Theories with strong predictive power are highly valued, because the predictions can often encourage the falsification of the theory. The concept of predictive power differs from explanatory or descriptive power (where phenomena that are already known are retrospectively explained by a given theory) in that it allows a prospective test of theoretical understanding.
- Preschool education: See Nursery school.
- Primary education: (or elementary education) Consists of the first years of formal, structured education that occurs during childhood. In most countries, it is compulsory for children to receive primary education (though in many jurisdictions it is permissible for parents to provide it). Primary education generally begins when children are four to seven years of age. The division between primary and secondary education is somewhat arbitrary, but it generally occurs at about twelve years of age (adolescence); some educational systems have separate middle schools for that period.
- Problem finding: Problem discovery. It is part of the larger problem process that includesproblem solving. Problem finding requires intellectual vision and insight into what is missing. This involves the application of creativity.
- Problem solving: Forms part of thinking. It occurs if an organism or an artificial intelligence system does not know how to proceed from a given state to a desired goal state. It is part of the larger problem process that includes problem finding.
- Problem-based learning: (PBL) A didactic concept of "active learning" in tertiary education, but is currently being adapted for use in K–12 education. The defining characteristics of PBL are: learning is driven by messy, open-ended problems; students work in small collaborative groups; and "teachers" are not required, the process uses "facilitators" of learning.

Accordingly, students are encouraged to take responsibility for their group and organise and direct the learning process with support from a tutor or instructor. Advocates of PBL claim it can be used to enhance content knowledge and foster the development of communication, problem-solving, and self-directed learning skill.

- Procedural knowledge: (or know-how) The knowledge of how to perform some task. Know-how is different from other kinds of knowledge such as propositional knowledge in that it can be directly applied to a task. Procedural knowledge about solving problems differs from propositional knowledge about problem solving. For example, in some legal systems, this knowledge or know-how has been considered the intellectual property of a company, and can be transferred when that company is purchased.
- Professional certification: (trade certification, or professional designation often called simply certification or qualification) A designation earned by a person to certify that he is qualified to perform a job. Certification indicates that the individual has a specific knowledge, skills, or abilities in the view of the certifying body. Professional certifications are awarded by professional bodies and corporations. The difference between licensure and certification is licensure is required by law, whereas certification is generally voluntary. Sometimes the word certification is used for licensure.
- Programmed instruction: A field first studied extensively by the behaviorist B. F. Skinner. It consists of teaching through small lessons, where each lesson must be mastered in order to go on to the next. Students work through the programmed material by themselves at their own speed. After each step, they are presented with a question to test their comprehension, then are immediately shown the correct answer or given additional information.
- Propositional knowledge: (or declarative knowledge) Knowledge that some proposition is either true or false. This distinguishes propositional knowledge from know-how or procedural knowledge, which is the knowledge of how to perform some task. This article discusses propositional knowledge from a variety of perspectives, including philosophy, science, and history.

What is the difference between knowledge and beliefs? A belief is an internal thought or memory which exists in one's mind. Most people accept that for a belief to be knowledge it must be, at least, true and justified. The Gettier problem in philosophy is the question of whether there are any other requirements before a belief can be accepted as knowledge.

- Public education: Schooling provided for the general public by the government, whether national or local, and paid for by taxes, which leads to it often being called state education. Schools provided under such a system are called public schools in many countries, but in England the term "public school" refers to an elite of privately funded private schools which had their origins in medieval schools funded by charity to provide education for the poor.

Public education often involves the following: public funding; compulsory student attendance; state certification of teachers and curricula; and testing and national standards.

- Public school: The term has different (and in some cases contradictory) meanings due to regional differences.
- Pygmalion effect: (or Rosenthal effect) refers to situations in which students perform better than other students simply because they are expected to do so.

== Q ==
- Quiz: A form of game or puzzle in which the players (as individuals or in teams), attempt to answer questions correctly. A quiz usually is a form of student assessment, but often has fewer questions of lesser difficulty and requires less time for completion than a test.

== R ==
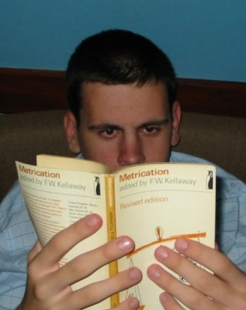
Reading a book

- Reading (process): The process of retrieving and comprehending some form of stored information or ideas. These ideas are usually some sort of representation of language, as symbols to be examined by sight, or by touch (for example Braille). Other types of reading may not be language-based, such as music notation or pictograms. By analogy, in computer science, reading is acquiring of data from some sort of computer storage.
- Reading disability: A condition in which a sufferer displays difficulty reading resulting primarily from neurological factors.
- Reading education in the USA: There are basically two different common methods of teaching reading. One usually refers to whole language approach ("look say"), the other usually refers to phonetics approach. The tension between these two approaches is often referred to as "the great debate".
- Reason: A term used in philosophy and other human sciences to refer to the higher cognitive faculties of the human mind. It describes a type of thought or aspect of thought, especially abstract thought, and the ability to think abstractly, which is felt to be especially human. The concept of reason is connected to language, as reflected in the meanings of the Greek word "logos", later to be translated by Latin "ratio" and then French "raison", from which the English word. Reason is thus a very important word in western intellectual history and shares much of its heritage with the now separate words logic and rationality.
- Reasoning: Defined very differently depending on the context of the understanding of reason as a form of knowledge. The Logical definition is the act of using reason, to derive a conclusion from certain premises, using a given methodology; and the two most commonly used explicit methods to reach a conclusion are deductive reasoning and inductive reasoning. However, within idealist philosophical contexts, reasoning is the mental process which informs our imagination, perceptions, thoughts, and feelings with whatever intelligibility these appear to contain; and thus links our experience with universal meaning. The specifics of the methods of reasoning are of interest to such disciplines as philosophy, logic, psychology, and artificial intelligence.
- Recitation: A discussion carried by a Teaching assistant to supplement a lecture given by a senior faculty at an academic institution. During the recitation, TAs will review the lecture, expand on the concepts, and carry a discussion with the students.
- Reference: Something that refers or points to something else, or acts as a connection or a link between two things. The objects it links may be concrete, such as books or locations, or abstract, such as data, thoughts, or memories. The object which is named by a reference, or to which the reference points, is the referent.
- Reinforcement: In operant conditioning, reinforcement is any change in an organism's surroundings that: occurs regularly when the organism behaves in a given way (that is, is contingent on a specific response); and is associated with an increase in the probability that the response will be made or in another measure of its strength.
- Religious education: Teaches the doctrines of a religion. Its usual purpose is to teach children the basics of a religion. A less common purpose is to teach new adherents of a religion.

Since people within a given country often hold varying religious and non-religious beliefs, government-sponsored religious education can be a source of conflict. Countries vary widely in whether religious education is allowed in government-run schools (often called "public schools"). Those that allow it also vary in the type of education provided.

- Research: Often described as an active, diligent, and systematic process of inquiry aimed at discovering, interpreting and revising facts. This intellectual investigation produces a greater understanding of events, behaviors, or theories, and makes practical applications through laws and theories. The term research is also used to describe a collection of information about a particular subject, and is usually associated with science and the scientific method.

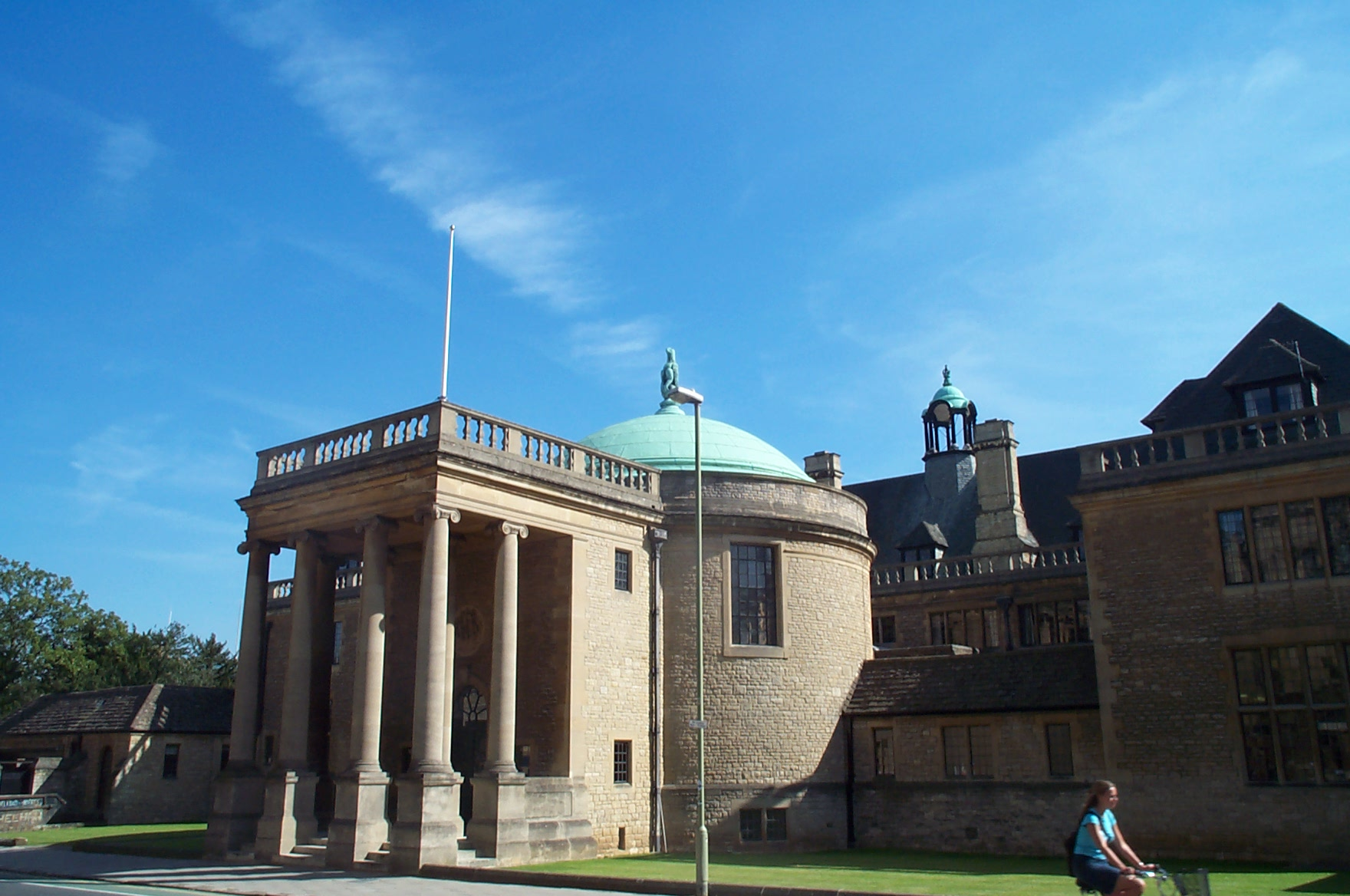
Rhodes House in Oxford

- Rhodes Scholarships: Created by Cecil Rhodes and have been awarded to applicants annually since 1902 by the Oxford-based Rhodes Trust on the basis of academic qualities, as well as those of character. They provide the successful candidate with two years of study at the University of Oxford in England, possibly extended for a third year.

When Rhodes died in 1902, his will stipulated that the greater part of his fortune was to go toward the establishment of a scholarship fund to reward applicants who exhibited worthy qualities of intellect, character, and physical ability.

- Rote learning: A learning technique which avoids grasping the inner complexities and inferences of the subject that is being learned and instead focuses on memorizing the material so that it can be recalled by the learner exactly the way it was read or heard.
- Rubric (academic): In education, a rubric is a set of criteria and standards linked to learning objectives that is used to assess a student's performance, such as on a paper, project, or essay.
