= Glossary of education terms (G–L) =

This glossary of education-related terms is based on how they commonly are used in Wikipedia articles. This article contains terms starting with G – L. Select a letter from the table of contents to find terms on other articles.

== G ==
- Gifted: (intellectual giftedness) An intellectual ability significantly higher than average. Gifted children develop asynchronously; their minds are often ahead of their physical growth, and specific cognitive and emotional functions often are at different stages of development within a single person. Gifted individuals form a heterogeneous group. Because gifted children are intellectually ahead of most of their age peers in at least one major subject area, they frequently require gifted education programs to reach their potential and avoid boredom. Gifted individuals experience the world differently and more intensely, resulting in unique social and emotional issues. The concept of giftedness has historically been rife with controversy, some even denying that this group exists.
- Gifted education: is a broad term for special practices, procedures and theories used in the education of children who have been identified as gifted or talented. Youths are usually identified as gifted by placing highly on certain standardized tests.

Advocates of gifted education argue that gifted and/or talented youth are so perceptually and intellectually above the mean, it is appropriate to pace their lessons more aggressively, track them into honors, Advanced Placement, or International Baccalaureate courses, or otherwise provide educational enrichment.

- Gymnasia and Realgymnasia: (singular: Gymnasium) and Realgymnasia were the classical higher or secondary schools of Germany from the sixteenth century to the twentieth century. Students were admitted at 9 or 10 years of age and were required to have a knowledge of reading, writing, and arithmetic.

== H ==
- Habituation: An example of non-associative learning in which there is a progressive diminution of behavioral response probability with repetition of a stimulus. It is another form of integration.
- heutagogy: The study of self-determined learning.
- Hidden curriculum: Draws attention to the idea that schools do more than simply transmit knowledge, as laid down in the official curricula. It is often used to criticize the social implications, political underpinnings, and cultural outcomes of modern educative activities. While early examinations were concerned with identifying the anti-democratic nature of schooling, later studies have taken various tones, including those concerned with socialism, capitalism, and anarchism in education.

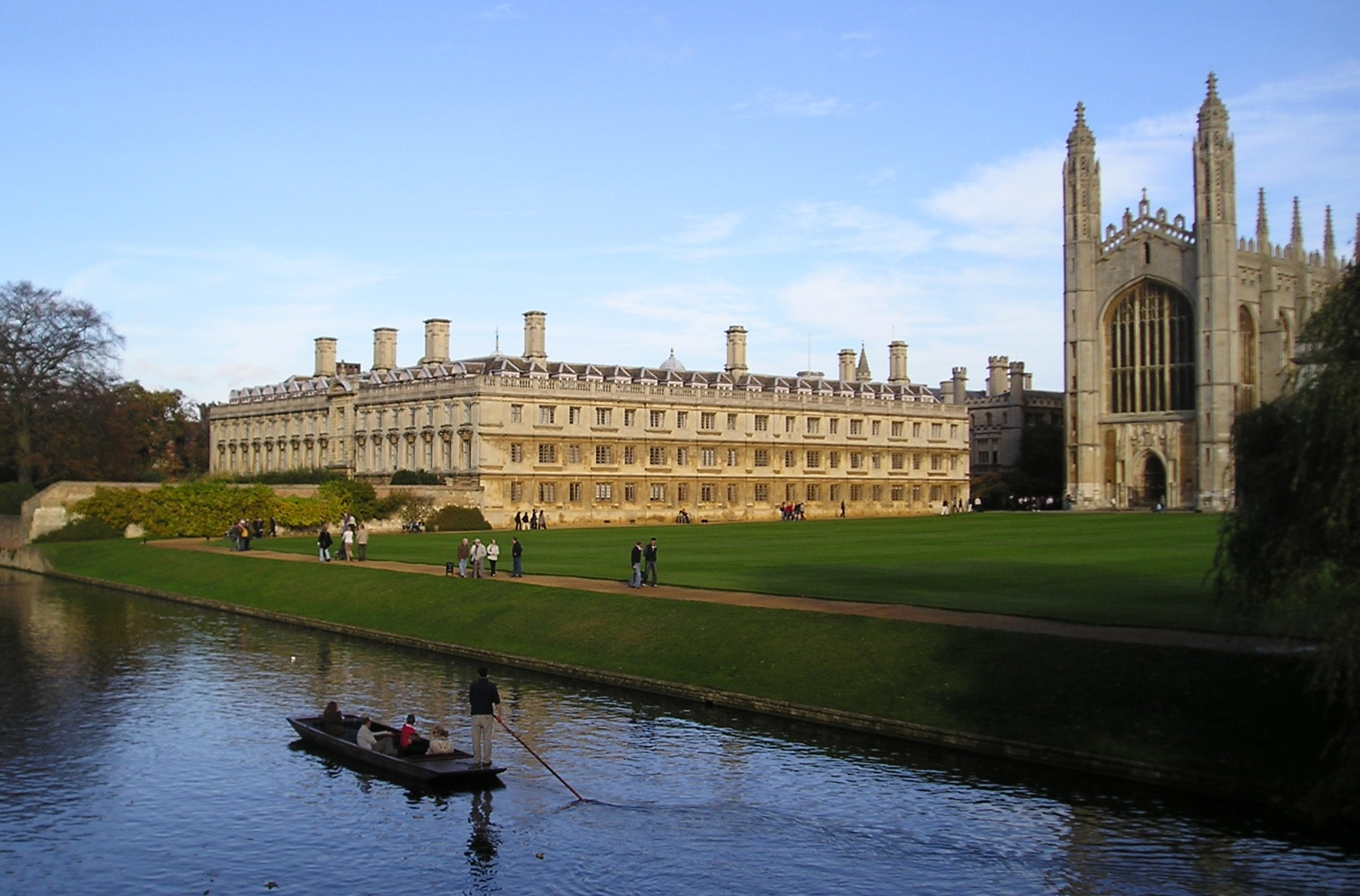
The University of Cambridge is an institute of higher learning.

- Higher education: Education provided by universities and other institutions that award academic degrees, such as community colleges, and liberal arts colleges.

Higher education includes both the teaching and the research activities of universities, and within the realm of teaching, it includes both the undergraduate level (sometimes referred to as tertiary education) and the graduate (or postgraduate) level (sometimes referred to as quaternary education or graduate school). Higher education differs from other forms of post-secondary education such as vocational education. However, most professional education is included within higher education, and many postgraduate qualifications are strongly vocationally or professionally oriented, for example in disciplines such as law and medicine.

- History of ideas: A field of research in history and in related fields dealing with the expression, preservation, and change of human ideas over time. Scholars often consider the history of ideas a sister discipline to, or a particular approach within, intellectual history. Work in the history of ideas usually involves close research in the history of philosophy and the history of literature.
- Homeschooling: (also home education or home school) An educational alternative in which children are educated at home and in the community, in contrast to a compulsory education which takes place in an institution such as a publicly run or privately run school. Home education methods are similar to those widely used before the popularization of compulsory education in the 19th century. Before this time, the majority of education worldwide was provided at home by family and community members, with only the privileged attending privately run schools or employing tutors, the only available alternatives at the time.

== I ==
- Individuals with Disabilities Education Act (IDEA): a U.S. federal law on Special Education
- Individualized instruction: A method of instruction in which content, instructional materials, instructional media, and pace of learning are based upon the abilities and interests of each individual learner.
- Inquiry education: (sometimes known as the inquiry method) A student-centered method of education focused on asking questions. Students are encouraged to ask questions which are meaningful to them, and which do not necessarily have easy answers; teachers are encouraged to avoid speaking at all when this is possible, and in any case to avoid giving answers in favor of asking more questions.
- Instructional capital: A term used in educational administration after the 1960s, to reflect capital resulting from investment in producing learning materials.
- Instructional design: (also known as instructional systems design) The analysis of learning needs and systematic development of instruction. Instructional designers often use instructional technology as a method for developing instruction. Instructional design models typically specify a method, that if followed will facilitate the transfer of knowledge, skills and attitude to the recipient or acquirer of the instruction.
- Instructional Leadership: Actions or behaviors exhibited by an individual or group in the field of education that are characterized by knowledge and skill in the area of curriculum and instructional methodology, the provision of resources so that the school's mission can be met, skilled communication in one-on-one, small-group and large-group settings, and the establishment of a clear and articulated vision for the educational institution. This vision, and decision making based on this vision are ideally characterized by a collaborative process and are inclusive of multiple stakeholders. Instructional leaders also promote collegiality and leadership behavior amongst other members of the institution.
- Instructional scaffolding: The provision of sufficient supports to promote learning when concepts and skills are being first introduced to students.
- Instructional technology: Born as a military response to the problems of a labor shortage during WWII in the United States. There was a definitive need to fill the factories with skilled labor. Instructional technology provided a methodology for training in a systematic and efficient manner.
- Instructional theory: A discipline that focuses on how to structure material for promoting the education of humans, particularly youth. Originating in the United States in the late 1970s, instructional theory is typically divided into two categories: the cognitive and behaviorist schools of thought. Instructional theory was spawned off the 1956 work of Benjamin Bloom, a University of Chicago professor, and the results of his Taxonomy of Education Objectives — one of the first modern codifications of the learning process.

One of the first instructional theorists was Robert M. Gagne, who in 1965 published Conditions of Learning for the Florida State University's Department of Educational Research. Renowned psychologist B. F. Skinner's theories of behavior were highly influential on instructional theorists because their hypotheses can be tested fairly easily with the scientific process.

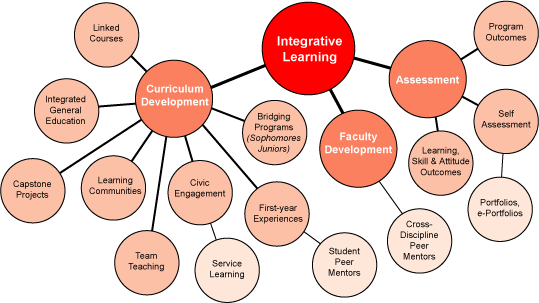
A concept map

- Integrative learning: A learning theory describing a movement toward integrated lessons helping students make connections across curricula. This higher education concept is distinct from the elementary and high school "integrated curriculum" movement.
- Intelligence (trait): The mental capacity to reason, plan, solve problems, think abstractly, comprehend ideas and language, and learn. Although nonscientists generally regard the concept of intelligence as having much broader scope, in psychology, the study of intelligence generally regards this trait as distinct from creativity, personality, character, or wisdom.
- International education: The practice and/or study of international cooperation and aid among countries, including the exchange of students, teachers, and researchers between countries. International education is connected to comparative education.
- Intrinsic motivation: Evident when people engage in an activity for its own sake, without some obvious external incentive present. A hobby is a typical example.
- Invigilator: Someone who ensures the smooth running of exams. An invigilator is responsible for ensuring that the Awarding Body's regulations are complied with; that exams start and finish at the correct time; that exam papers are secure whilst in their care; that attendance and seating plans are recorded; and that no cheating takes place. The invigilator will also deal with any problems that arise during an exam, including emergency evacuations, and ensure that no unauthorised materials are present, including mobile phones.

== J ==
- Joint Committee on Standards for Educational Evaluation: A coalition of major professional associations formed in 1975 to help improve the quality of evaluation. The Joint Committee published three sets of standards for evaluations. The Personnel Evaluation Standards was published in 1988, The Program Evaluation Standards (2nd edition) was published in 1994, and The Student Evaluations Standards was published in 2003.

== K ==
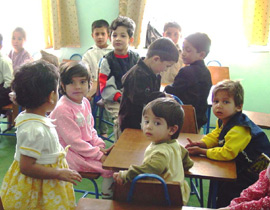
A kindergarten in Afghanistan.

- Kindergarten: (German for garden for children) A name used in many parts of the world for the first stages of a child's classroom education. In some parts kindergarten is part of the formal school system; in others it may refer to preschool or daycare.
- Kinesthetic learning: A teaching and learning style in which learning takes place by the student actually carrying out a physical activity, rather than listening to a lecture or merely watching a demonstration. Building dioramas, physical models or participating in role-playing or historical reenactment are some examples. Other examples include the kindergarten practice of having children perform various motions from left to right in preparation for reading education.
- Knowledge: Information of which someone is aware. Knowledge is also used to mean the confident understanding of a subject, potentially with the ability to use it for a specific purpose.

The unreliability of memory limits the certainty of knowledge about the past, while unpredictability of events yet to occur limits the certainty of knowledge about the future. Epistemology is the philosophical study of the nature, origin, and scope of knowledge.

- Knowledge Management: (or KM) A term applied to techniques used for the systematic collection, transfer, security and management of information within organisations, along with systems designed to help make best use of that knowledge. In particular it refers to tools and techniques designed to preserve the availability of information held by key individuals and facilitate decision making and reducing risk.
- Knowledge representation: (KR) Most commonly used to refer to representations intended for processing by modern computers, and particularly for representations consisting of explicit objects.
- Knowledge transfer: In the fields of Organizational development and organizational learning, is the practical problem of getting a packet of knowledge from one part of the organization to another (or all other) parts of the organization. It is considered to be more than just a communications problem.
- Knowledge visualization: A sub discipline of Information Design and Instructional Message Design (pedagogy; didactics, pedagogical Psychology). Knowledge Visualization aims to improve the transfer of knowledge by using computer and non-computer based visuals complementary. Examples of such visual formats are photographs, information graphics, sketches, diagrams, images, mind maps, objects, interactive visualizations, dynamic visuals (animations), information visualization applications, imaginary visualizations, stories.

== L ==
- Language education: The teaching and learning of a language or languages, usually as foreign languages.
- Law (principle): Refers to universal principles that describe the fundamental nature of something, to universal properties and relationships between things, or to descriptions that purport to explain these principles and relationships.
- Learning: The process of acquiring knowledge, skills, attitudes, or values, through study, experience, or teaching, that causes a change of behavior that is persistent, measurable, and specified or allows an individual to formulate a new mental construct or revise a prior mental construct (conceptual knowledge such as attitudes or values). It is a process that depends on experience and leads to long-term changes in behavior potential.
- Learning by teaching (LdL): In professional education (in German "Lernen durch Lehren", therefore LdL) designates a method which allows pupils and students to prepare and teach lessons or parts of lessons. Learning by teaching should not be confused with presentations or lectures by students, as students do not only convey a certain content, but choose their own methodological and didactical approach in teaching their classmates a certain area of the respective subject.
- Learning disability: In the United States, the term learning disability is used to refer to socio-biological conditions that affect a person's communicative capacities and potential to learn. The term includes conditions such as perceptual disability, brain injury, minimal brain dysfunction, autism, dyslexia, and developmental aphasia. In the United Kingdom, the term learning disability is used more generally to refer to developmental disability and intellectual disability.
- Learning outcome: The term may refer to course aims (intended learning outcomes) or may be roughly synonymous with educational objectives (observed learning outcomes). Usage varies between organisations.
- Lecture: An oral presentation intended to teach people about a particular subject, for example by a university or college teacher. Lectures are used to convey critical information, history, background, theories and equations. A politician's speech, a minister's sermon, or even a businessman's sales presentation may be similar in form to a lecture. Usually the lecturer will stand at the front of the room and recite information relevant to the lecture's content.
- Legal education: The education of individuals who intend to become legal professionals (attorneys and judges) or those who simply intend to use their law degree to some end, either related to law (such as politics or academic) or unrelated (such as business entrepreneurship).

This entry primarily discusses some of the general attributes of legal education in the United States for those who intend to use their degree in order to become legal professionals.

- Lesson plan: A teacher's detailed description of the course of instruction for an individual lesson. While there is no one way to construct a correct lesson plan, most lesson plans contain similar elements.

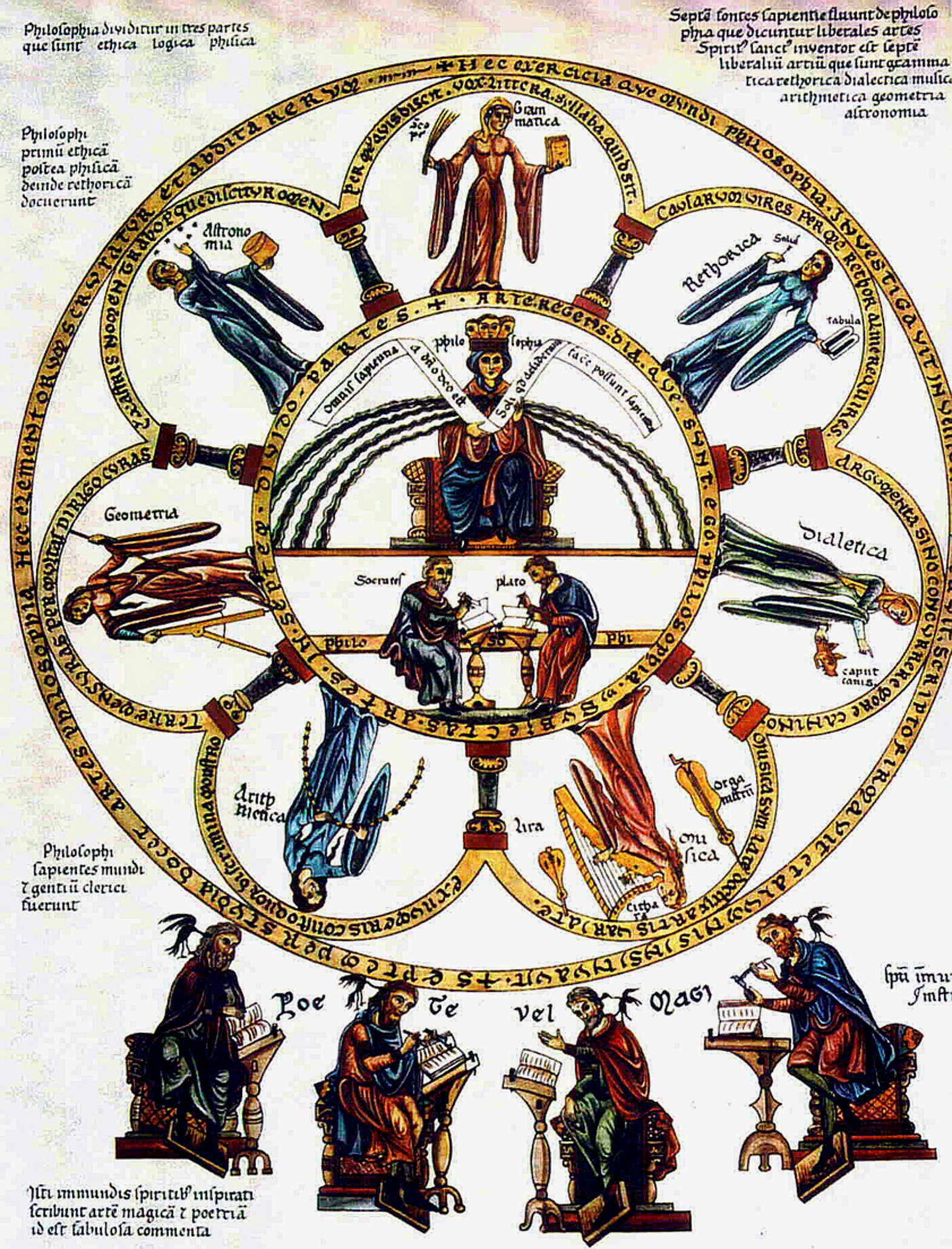
The seven liberal arts

- Liberal arts: Studies that are intended to provide general knowledge and intellectual skills, rather than more specialized occupational or professional skills.

The scope of the liberal arts has changed with society. It once emphasised the education of elites in the classics; but, with the rise of science and humanities during the Age of Enlightenment, the scope and meaning of "liberal arts" expanded to include them. Still excluded from the liberal arts are topics that are specific to particular occupations, such as agriculture, business, dentistry, engineering, medicine, pedagogy (school-teaching), and pharmacy.

- List group label strategy: a prereading strategy designed to help students make connections to prior knowledge.
- Literacy: The ability to read, write, speak, and listen. In modern context, the word means reading and writing in a level adequate for written communication and generally a level that enables one to successfully function at certain levels of a society.
