= Glossary of education terms (T–Z) =

This glossary of education-related terms is based on how they commonly are used in Wikipedia articles. This article contains terms starting with T – Z. Select a letter from the table of contents to find terms on other articles.

== T ==
- Taba approach - four thinking strategies, known as the Taba approach, are concept development, interpretation of data, application of generalizations, and interpretations of feelings, attitudes and values.
- Taxonomy of Educational Objectives: An educational taxonomy that classifies educational objectives into three domains: cognitive, affective, and psychomotor.
- Teacher: In education, one who teaches students or pupils, often a course of study, lesson plan, or a practical skill, including learning and thinking skills. There are many different ways to teach and help students learn. This is often referred to as the teacher's pedagogy. When deciding what teaching method to use, a teacher will need to consider students' background knowledge, environment, and their learning goals as well as standardized curriculum as determined by their school district.
- Technology education: The study of the human ability to create and use tools to shape the natural environment to meet their needs. The goal of technology education is to spread technological literacy which is accomplished by bringing laboratory activities to students. The term "technology education" is frequently shortened to "tech ed".
- Technology Integration: A term used by educators to describe effective uses of technology by teachers and students in K-12 and university classrooms. Teachers use technology to support instruction in language arts, social studies, science, math, or other content areas. When teachers integrate technology into their classroom practice, learners are empowered to be actively engaged in their learning.
- Tertiary education: (also referred to as third-stage or third level education) The educational level following the completion of a school providing a secondary education such as a high school, secondary school, or gymnasium. Tertiary education is commonly higher education which prepares students for a quaternary education.

Colleges and universities are examples of institutions that provide tertiary education. The term Tertiary education can also be used to refer to vocational education and training.

- Textbook: A manual of instruction or a standard book in any branch of study. They are classified by both the target audience and the subject. Textbooks are usually published by specialty printers to serve every request for an understanding of every subject that can be taught. It is a big business that requires mass volume sales to make the publications profitable. Although most textbooks are only published in printed format with hard covers, some can now be viewed online.
- Theory of cognitive development: A developmental psychology theory developed by Jean Piaget to explain cognitive development. The theory is central to child psychology and is based on schemata—schemes of how one perceives the world—in "critical periods," times when children are particularly susceptible to certain information.
- Theory of multiple intelligences: A psychological and educational theory formulated by Howard Gardner espousing that eight kinds of "intelligence" exist in humans, each relating to a different sphere of human life and activity.
- The Times Higher Education Supplement:, (also known as The Times Higher or The THES) A newspaper based in London that reports specifically on issues related to higher education. It is owned by TSL Education, which was, until October 2005, a division of News International. The paper is edited by John O'Leary, author of The Times Good University Guide. The THES is probably best known for publishing The Times Higher World University Rankings (see college and university rankings), which first appeared in November 2004, with new rankings published annually.
- Training: Refers to the acquisition of knowledge, skills, attitudes as a result of the teaching of vocational or practical skills and knowledge and relates to specific useful skills. It forms the core of apprenticeships and provides the backbone of content at technical colleges or polytechnics. Today it is often referred to as professional development.
- Truth: When someone sincerely agrees with an assertion, he or she is claiming that it is the truth. Philosophy seeks answers for certain questions about truth and the word truth.
- Tuition: A fee charged for educational instruction especially at a formal institution of learning. Tuition is charged by educational institutions to assist with funding of staff and faculty salaries, course offerings, lab equipment, computer systems, libraries, and facility upkeeping. Fees are also used to fund facilities that provide a comfortable learning experience for its students, such as student lounges.

== U ==
- Understanding: A psychological process related to an abstract or physical object, such as, person, situation and message whereby one is able to think about it and use concepts to deal adequately with that object.
- UNESCO: The United Nations Educational, Scientific and Cultural Organization, commonly known as UNESCO, is a specialized agency of the United Nations established in 1945. Its purpose is to contribute to peace and security by promoting international collaboration through education, science, and culture in order to further universal respect for justice, the rule of law, and the human rights and fundamental freedoms proclaimed in the UN Charter.
- Universal preschool: The notion that access to preschool should be available to families similar to Kindergarten. Child advocates have different definitions of the definition of who is included and how it is to be funded. There has been a move to change the name to Preschool for All. Like Kindergarten, the concept is to have a voluntary program, unlike education, that is mandated by law in the United States with exceptions to allow for homeschooling and alternative education.
- University: An institution of higher (or tertiary) education and research which awards academic degrees in various academic disciplines. Universities typically provide undergraduate education and postgraduate education.
- Unobservables: Entities whose existence, nature, properties, qualities or relations are not observable. In the philosophy of science typical examples of "unobservables" are atomic particles, the force of gravity, causation and beliefs or desires. However, philosophers also characterize all objects—trees, tables, other minds, microbiological things and so on to which humans ascribe as the thing causing their perception—as unobservable.

== V ==
A blacksmith is a traditional trade.

- Virtual learning environment: (VLE) A software system designed to facilitate teachers in the management of educational courses for their students, especially by helping teachers and learners with course administration. The system can often track the learners' progress, which can be monitored by both teachers and learners. While often thought of as primarily tools for distance education, they are most often used to supplement the face-to-face classroom.
- Visual learning: A proven teaching method in which graphic organizers, such as webs, concept maps idea maps, and slide shows are used to help students of all ages think and learn more effectively.
- Vocational education: (or Vocational Education and Training (VET)) Prepares learners for careers or professions that are traditionally non-academic and directly related to a specific trade, occupation or vocation, hence the term, in which the learner participates. It is sometimes referred to as technical education, as the learner directly specialises in a particular narrow technique of using technology.

== W ==
- Waldorf education Waldorf education (also known as Steiner education) is a humanistic approach to pedagogy based on the educational philosophy of the Austrian philosopher Rudolf Steiner, the founder of anthroposophy. Learning is interdisciplinary, integrating practical, artistic, and conceptual elements. The approach emphasizes the role of the imagination in learning, developing thinking that includes a creative as well as an analytic component.
- Whole language: A term used by reading teachers to describe an instructional philosophy which focuses on reading as an activity best taught in a broader context of meaning. Rather than focusing on reading as a mechanical skill, it is taught as an ongoing part of every student's existing language and life experience. Building on language skills each student already possesses, reading and writing are seen as a part of a broader "whole language" spectrum.
- Wisdom: The ability to make correct judgments and decisions. It is an intangible quality gained through experience some think. Yet others think it is a quality that even a child, otherwise immature, may possess independent of experience or complete knowledge. Whether or not something is wise is determined in a pragmatic sense by its popularity, how long it has been around, and its ability to predict against future events. Wisdom is also accepted from cultural, philosophical and religious sources. Some think of wisdom as foreseeing consequences and acting to maximize beneficial results.
- Writing: May refer to two activities: the inscribing of characters on a medium, with the intention of forming words and other constructs that represent language or record information, and the creation of material to be conveyed through written language. (There are some exceptions; for example, the use of a typewriter to record language is generally called typing, rather than writing.) Writing refers to both activities equally, and both activities may often occur simultaneously.
- Workshop: A brief intensive course, a seminar or a series of meetings emphasizing interaction and exchange of information among a usually small number of participants.

== X ==
- Xylophone: a musical instrument that is used in elementary music classes. It is simple to use and the teacher can add or remove "accidental" notes (sharped and flatted pitches) so that the instrument can play in different keys.

== Y ==
- Youth: Time between childhood and adulthood.

== Z ==
- Zero tolerance policy: A policy that states that prohibited behaviors and actions will not be tolerated—no exceptions. Zero tolerance policies have different prohibitions, which may include inter alia, contraband such as weapons, illegal drugs, or actions such as bullying, harassment, or violence.
