= Glossary of education terms (S) =

This glossary of education-related terms is based on how they commonly are used in Wikipedia articles. This article contains terms starting with S. Select a letter from the table of contents to find terms on other articles.

== S ==
- Sail training: From its modern interpretations to its antecedents when maritime nations would send young naval officer candidates to sea (e.g., see Outward Bound), sail training provides an unconventional and effective way of building many useful skills on and off the water. Through the unique environment of the sea, contemporary sail trainees learn that what they are doing is important and that their efforts are essential to the operation and safety of the ship.
- School: A place designated for learning. The range of institutions covered by the term varies from country to country.
- School bus:, A bus used to transport children and adolescents to and from school. The first school bus was horse-drawn, introduced in 1827 by George Shillibeer for a Quaker school at Abney Park in Stoke Newington, London, and was designed to carry twenty-five children. Since then, school buses of many types have become widespread, and motorised, and are used in all parts of the world.
- School counselor: A practitioner who meets the needs of students in three basic educational domains: academic development, career development, and personal/social development. This is accomplished through the implementation of a comprehensive school counseling program that promotes and enhances student achievement through a guidance curriculum, individual planning strategies, responsive services and comprehensive school counseling program support/advocacy.
- School discipline: A form of discipline found in schools. The term refers to students complying with a code of behaviour often known as the school rules. Among other things these rules may set out the expected standards of clothing, timekeeping, social behaviour and work ethic. The term may also be applied to the punishment that is the consequence of transgression of the code of behaviour. For this reason the usage of school discipline sometimes means punishment for breaking school rules rather than behaving within the school rules.
- School psychologist: A practitioner who applies his psychological training to assess and help school children.
- Science education: The field concerned with sharing science content and process with individuals not traditionally considered part of the scientific community. The target individuals may be children, college students, or adults within the general public. The field of science education comprises science content, some sociology, and some teaching pedagogy.
- Science fair: Generally a competition where contestants create a project related to science or some scientific phenomenon. Science fairs usually are involved with children and schooling; however, the term can be used to describe science fairs independent of the age of the contestants involved. They are often also combined with competition in mathematics or history.
- Secondary education: is a period of education which, in most contemporary educational systems of the world, follows directly after primary education, and which may be followed by tertiary, "post-secondary", or "higher" education (e.g., university). In Australia and other countries secondary schools is the official term for institutions offering this period of education. In other parts of the English-speaking world, secondary school is often used synonymously with secondary education.
- Self-concept: (or self-identity) The mental and conceptual awareness and persistent regard that sentient beings hold with regard their own being. Components of a being's self-concept include physical, psychological, and social attributes; and can be influenced by its attitudes, habits, beliefs and ideas. These components and attributes can each be condensed to the general concepts of self-image and the self-esteem.
- Self-efficacy: The belief that one has the capabilities to execute the courses of actions required to manage prospective situations. Unlike efficacy, which is the power to produce an effect (in essence, competence), self-efficacy is the belief (however accurate) that one has the power to produce that effect.

It is important here to understand the distinction between self-esteem and self efficacy. Self-esteem relates to a person’s sense of self-worth, whereas self efficacy relates to a person’s perception of their ability to reach a goal. For example, say a person is a terrible rock climber. They would likely have a poor efficacy in regard to rock climbing, but this wouldn’t need to affect their self-esteem; most people don’t invest much of their self-esteem in this activity.

- Self-esteem: (or self-worth) Includes a person's subjective appraisal of himself or herself as intrinsically positive or negative to some degree.
- Service learning: A method of teaching, learning and reflecting that combines academic classroom curriculum with meaningful youth service throughout the community. As a teaching methodology, it falls under the category of experiential education. More specifically, it integrates meaningful community service with instruction and reflection to enrich the learning experience, teach civic responsibility, encourage lifelong civic engagement, and strengthen communities.
- Sex education: Education about sexual reproduction in human beings, sexual intercourse and other aspects of human sexual behavior.
- Situated learning: Education that takes place in a setting functionally identical to that where the learning will be applied.
- Skill: An ability, usually learned, to perform actions.
- Social constructionism: A sociological theory of knowledge developed by Peter L. Berger and Thomas Luckmann with their 1966 book, The Social Construction of Reality. The focus of social constructionism is to uncover the ways in which individuals and groups participate in the creation of their perceived reality. As an approach, it involves looking at the ways social phenomena are created, institutionalized, and made into tradition by humans. Socially constructed reality is seen as an ongoing, dynamic process; reality is re-produced by people acting on their interpretations and their knowledge of it.
- Sociology of knowledge: The study of the social origins of ideas, and of the effects prevailing ideas have on societies. (Compare history of ideas.)
- Sociology of scientific knowledge: (SSK) Closely related to the sociology of science, considers social influences on science. Practitioners (sociologists, philosophers of science, historians of science, anthropologists and computer scientists) have engaged in controversy concerning the role that social factors play in scientific development relative to rational, empirical and other factors.
- Socratic method: (or method of elenchos or Socratic debate) A dialectic method of inquiry, largely applied to the examination of key moral concepts and first described by Plato in the Socratic Dialogues. For this, Socrates is customarily regarded as the father and fountainhead for ethics or moral philosophy.

It is a form of philosophical enquiry. It involves two or more speakers, usually with one as the master (or wise one) and the others as students or fools. The method is credited to Socrates, who began to engage in such discussion with his fellow Athenians after a visit to the Oracle of Delphi.

- Special education:, describes an educational alternative that focuses on the teaching of students with academic, behavioral, health, or physical needs that cannot sufficiently be met using traditional educational programs or techniques.
- STEM fields: The Science, Technology, Engineering, and Mathematics (STEM) fields are collectively considered core technological underpinnings of an advanced society. In many forums (including political/governmental and academic) the strength of the STEM workforce is viewed as an indicator of a nation's ability to sustain itself. Maintaining healthy levels of its citizenry well versed in the STEM fields is a key portion of the public education agenda of the United States of America at all levels, and substantial lobbying is underway in Washington, DC to raise awareness of STEM education issues.
- Stipend: A form of payment or salary, such as for an internship or apprenticeship. Stipends are usually lower than what would be expected as a permanent salary for similar work. This is because the stipend is complemented by other benefits such as instruction, work experience, food, accommodation, and personal satisfaction. Universities usually refer to monies paid to graduate research assistants as a stipend, rather than as wages, to reflect complementary benefits.
- Student: Etymologically derived through Middle English from the Latin second-type conjugation verb "stŭdērĕ", which means "to direct one's zeal at"; hence a student is one who directs zeal at a subject. Also known as a disciple in the sense of a religious area of study, and/or in the sense of a "discipline" of learning. In widest use, student is used to mean a school or class attendee. In many countries, the word student is however reserved for higher education or university students; persons attending classes in primary or secondary schools being called pupils.
- Student activism: A form of youth-led community organizing that is specifically oriented towards engaging students as activists in order to create change in the educational system.
- Student-centered learning: An approach to education focusing on the needs of the students, rather than those of others involved in the educational process, such as teachers and administrators. This approach has many implications for the design of curriculum, course content, and interactivity of courses.
- Student voice: the distinct perspectives and actions of young people throughout schools focused on education itself.
- Student loans: Loans offered to students to assist in payment of the costs of professional education. These loans usually carry lower interests than other loans, and are usually issued by the government.
- Student organization: A voluntary association of students at institutions of secondary and higher education for a specific legal purpose. Such organizations are often sponsored through and receive funding from a student government.
- Syllabus: (plural syllabi or syllabuses) A document with an outline and summary of topics to be covered in a course. It is often either set out by an exam board, or prepared by the professor who teaches the course, and is usually given to each student during the first class session.
- Synthesis: (from the ancient Greek σύν (with) and θεσις (placing), is commonly understood to be an integration of two or more pre-existing elements which results in a new creation.
