= Glossary of education terms (D–F) =

This glossary of education-related terms is based on how they commonly are used in Wikipedia articles. This article contains terms starting with D – F. Select a letter from the table of contents to find terms on other articles.

== D ==
- Deemed university: ‘Deemed-to-be-University’, Status of autonomy granted to high performing institutes and departments of various universities in India by Government of India.
- Distance education: (or distance learning) A field of education that focuses on the pedagogy/andragogy, technology, and instructional systems design that is effectively incorporated in delivering education to students who are not physically "on site" to receive their education. Instead, teachers and students may communicate asynchronously (at times of their own choosing) by exchanging printed or electronic media, or through technology that allows them to communicate in real time (synchronously). Distance education courses that require a physical on-site presence for any reason including the taking of examinations is considered to be a hybrid or blended course or program.
- Dunce: A person incapable of learning. The word is derived from the name of the great schoolman, John Duns Scotus, whose works on logic, theology and philosophy were accepted textbooks in the universities from the 14th century.
- Dyslexia: Said to be a neurological disorder with biochemical and genetic markers. Dyslexia was originally defined as a difficulty with reading and writing that could not be explained by general intelligence. One diagnostic approach is to compare their ability in areas such as reading and writing to that which would be predicted by his or her general level of intelligence, but some would say that it is not certain that intelligence should be a predictor of reading or writing ability; and also that the causes, effects and treatments of reading disabilities may be similar for all levels of intelligence.

== E ==
- Early childhood education: Covers the education of a child from the period from birth to eight years of age.
- Education: A social science that encompasses teaching and learning specific knowledge, beliefs, and skills. Licensed and practicing teachers in the field use a variety of methods and materials in order to impart a curriculum.
- Education policy: is the collection of rules, both stated and implicit, or the regularities in practice that govern the behavior of persons in schools. Education policy analysis is the scholarly study of education policy.
- Education reform: A plan, program, or movement which attempts to bring about a systematic change in educational theory or practice across a community or society.
- Education voucher: (commonly called a school voucher) A certificate by which parents are given the ability to pay for the education of their children at a school of their choice, rather than the public school to which they were assigned. These vouchers would be paid for using tax revenues.
- Educational animation: Animation produced for the specific purpose of fostering learning.
- Educational counseling: Conducted by counselors in schools and universities. It is intended to help children suffering from education-related traumas such as beatings and other forms of corporal punishment used in many countries. A more common application is with children who have been abused or bullied. The counselor works with the child to help him or her get over the trauma he or she has suffered.
- Educational evaluation: The evaluation process of characterizing and appraising some aspect of the education enterprise.
- Educational film: A film or movie whose primary purpose is to educate. Educational films have been used in classrooms as an alternative to other teaching methods.
- Educational games: Games, including video games of this genre, designed to teach people, typically children, about a certain subject or help them learn a skill as they play. Some people call these types of games edutainment because they combine education and entertainment.
- Educational leadership: Leadership in formal educational settings. It draws upon interdisciplinary literature, generally, but ideally distinguishes itself through its focus on pedagogy, epistemology and human development. In contemporary practice it borrows from political science and business. Debate within the field relates to this tension.
- Educational organization: Organization within the scope of education. It is a common misconception that this means it is organizing educational system; rather, it deals with the theory of organization as it applies to education of the human mind.
- Educational perennialism: Perennialists believe that one should teach the things that they believe are of everlasting importance to all people everywhere. They believe that the most important topics develop a person. Since details of fact change constantly, these cannot be the most important. Therefore, one should teach principles, not facts. Since people are human, one should teach first about humans, not machines or techniques. Since people are people first, and workers second if at all, one should teach liberal topics first, not vocational topics.
- Educational programming language: A programming language that is designed primarily as a learning instrument and not so much as a tool for writing real-world application programs.
- Educational psychology: The study of how humans learn in educational settings, the effectiveness of educational treatments, the psychology of teaching, and the social psychology of schools as organizations. Although the terms "educational psychology" and "school psychology" are often used interchangeably, researchers and theorists are likely to be identified as educational psychologists, whereas practitioners in schools or school-related settings are identified as school psychologists. Educational psychology is concerned with the processes of educational attainment among the general population and sub-populations such as gifted children and those subject to specific disabilities.
- Educational research: Research conducted to investigate behavioral patterns in pupils, students, teachers and other participants in schools and other educational institutions. Such research is often conducted by examining work products such as documents and standardized test results. The methods of educational research are derived chiefly from the social sciences, and in particular from psychology.
- Educational software: Computer software whose primary purpose is teaching or self-learning.
- Educational technology: The use of technology to improve education. It is a systematic, iterative process for designing instruction or training used to improve performance. Educational technology is sometimes also known as instructional technology or learning technology.
- E-learning: An approach to facilitate and enhance learning through, and based on, both computer and communications technology. Such devices can include personal computers, CD-ROMs, Digital Television, P.D.A.s and Mobile Phones. Communications technology enables the use of the Internet, email, discussion forums, collaborative software and team learning systems (see also online deliberation).
- Electronic portfolio: In the context of education and learning, an electronic portfolio, normally known as an ePortfolio or a digital portfolio, is a portfolio based on electronic media and services. It consists of a personal digital record containing information such as a collection of artifacts or evidence demonstrating what one knows and can do.
- Empirical knowledge: (or a posteriori knowledge) Propositional knowledge obtained by experience or sensorial information. It is contrasted with a priori knowledge, or knowledge that is gained through the apprehension of innate ideas, "intuition," "pure reason," or other non-experiential sources. The natural and social sciences are usually considered a posteriori, literally "after the fact," disciplines. Mathematics and logic are usually considered a priori, "before the fact," disciplines.
- Engagement: The sentiment a student feels or does not feel towards learning or the learning environment.
- Epistemic theories of truth: Attempts to analyse the notion of truth in terms of epistemic notions such as "belief", "acceptance", "verification", "justification", "perspective" and so on. There is a variety of such conceptions, and they may be classified into verificationist theories and perspectivalist and relativist theories.

Verificationism is based on a certain kind of mental activity: "verifying" a proposition. The distinctive claim of verificationism is that the result of such verifications is, by definition, truth. That is, truth is reducible to this process of verification.
According to perspectivalism and relativism, a proposition is only true relative to a particular perspective. Roughly, a proposition is true relative to a perspective if and only if it is "accepted" or "endorsed" or "legitimated" somehow by that perspective.

- Epistemology: (from the Greek words episteme (knowledge) and logos (word/speech)) The branch of philosophy that deals with the nature, origin and scope of knowledge. Historically, it has been one of the most investigated and most debated of all philosophical subjects. Much of this debate has focused on analysing the nature and variety of knowledge and how it relates to similar notions such as truth and belief. Much of this discussion concerns the justification of knowledge claims, that is the grounds on which one can claim to know a particular fact.
- Exchange student: A student (usually from high school or university) who temporarily goes abroad and lives with a host family in a foreign country, and attends school there. That host family often also sends a child of theirs abroad, usually to the same country as the student they are hosting. In this way, the two students are said to have been "exchanged," essentially temporarily trading countries with each other, although the period of exchange may not necessarily be simultaneous. The main purpose of exchange programs is to increase cultural understanding, both for the student and the people in the host country he/she comes into contact with. Exchanges are often arranged by organizations created for this purpose, called student exchange programs. Youth For Understanding and American Field Service are two examples of these organizations.
- Experience: Comprises knowledge of or skill in or observation of some thing or some event gained through involvement in or exposure to that thing or event. The history of the word experience aligns it closely with the concept of experiment.

The concept of experience generally refers to know-how or procedural knowledge, rather than propositional knowledge. Philosophers dub knowledge based on experience "empirical knowledge" or "a posteriori knowledge". A person with considerable experience in a certain field can gain a reputation as an expert.

- Experiential education: (or "learning by doing") The process of actively engaging students in an authentic experience that will have benefits and consequences. Students make discoveries and experiment with knowledge themselves instead of hearing or reading about the experiences of others. Students also reflect on their experiences, thus developing new skills, new attitudes, and new theories or ways of thinking. Experiential education is related to the constructivist learning theory.
- Experimental analysis of behavior: The name given to the approach to psychology founded by B. F. Skinner. As its name suggests, its foundational principle was the rejection of theoretical analysis, in particular the kinds of learning theory that had grown up in the comparative psychology of the 1920-1950 period, in favor of a more direct approach. It owed its early success to the effectiveness of Skinner's procedure of operant conditioning, both in the laboratory and in behavior therapy.
- Expulsion (education): Removing a student from a school or university for violating rules or academic honor codes.
- Extra credit is an academic concept, particularly used in schools. Students are offered the opportunity to undertake optional work, additional to their compulsory school work, in order to gain additional credit that would boost their grades.
- Extracurricular activities: Activities performed by students that fall outside the realm of the normal curriculum of school or university education. Extracurricular activities exist at all levels of education, from high school and college to university education. Such activities are generally voluntary as opposed to mandatory, non-paying, tend to be social or philanthropic as opposed to scholastic, and involve others of the same age. Students often organize and direct these activities under faculty sponsorship.

== F ==
- Forbidden knowledge: (in contrast to secret knowledge) Used to describe forbidden books or other information to which access is restricted or deprecated for political or religious reasons. Forbidden knowledge is commonly not secret, rather a society or various institutions will use repressive mechanisms to either completely prevent the publication of information they find objectionable or dangerous (censorship), or failing that, to try to reduce the public's trust in such information (propaganda). Public repression can create paradoxical situation where the proscribed information is generally common knowledge but publicly citing it is disallowed.
- Functional illiteracy: Refers to the inability of an individual to use reading, speaking, writing, and computational skills efficiently in everyday life situations. Unlike an illiterate, a functionally illiterate adult could be able to read and write text in his native language (with a variable degree of grammatical correctness, speed, and style), but is unable like the first, even in his own cultural and linguistic environment, to perform such fundamental tasks as filling out an application for employment, following written instructions, reading a newspaper, reading traffic signs, consulting a dictionary, or understanding a bus schedule.
- Future Problem Solving Program: (FPSP) An international academic competition. Over 250,000 students internationally participate in the Future Problem Solving program every year. Participating countries include the United States, Canada, Australia, New Zealand, Korea, Malaysia, Russia, Hong Kong and Singapore.
