= List group label strategy =

List, Group, Label, or LGL, is a prereading strategy designed to help students make connections to prior knowledge.

== Background ==
LGL was designed to help teachers activate students’ schema in regards to a particular concept, to improve existing vocabulary, to organize verbal concepts, and to remember new vocabulary. LGL was introduced by Hilda Taba in her book, Teachers’ Handbook to Elementary Social Studies (1967). The rationale for using this strategy is based on the idea that categorizing words will help students organize new words and concepts in relation to already known words/concepts. Students’ activation of prior knowledge then aids them in making inferences and elaborations that could lead to deeper understanding of texts. LGL was originally used to aid students in remembering technical vocabulary in social studies and science. Many teachers also use it in other curriculums to help students focus on background knowledge.

== Classroom procedure ==
List. The first step is to produce a list of words that are associated with a particular concept that will be studied. Before beginning the new topic in a given subject, the teacher selects a one- or two-word concept and displays it (e.g. on board, whiteboard, overhead, etc.). Example concepts are: earthquakes, The Civil War, community, Edgar Allan Poe. Next, the class brainstorms words and phrases that are related to the given topic. The teacher records between 25 and 40 of the students’ responses on the board. The teacher might ask that each student offer at least one word or phrase to ensure each student connects with background knowledge. After the list has been generated, the teacher reads it aloud to the class. The students will now have seen the correct spelling of the word and heard its correct pronunciation.

Group. The second step of the LGL strategy is to group the words and phrases into categories. Students look for common elements of the words to form the categories. These similarities might include similar meanings, parts of speech, etc. Some teachers find it helpful to set parameters for organizing, such as the number of words in a group and the number of groups. For example, a teacher may want at least three words in a group, with a maximum of eight groups. Teachers find that such parameters help students to look more deeply at the words and decide if a word should be categorized in a particular group. Some teachers also allow students to keep a ‘miscellaneous’ group for words they are unsure of. Students can use a variety of groupings, and they will be asked to tell why the words belong in the group they are in.

Label. The last step of the LGL strategy is to label the categories. After the original list of words has been categorized by the students, they are asked to label each category with a title that connects all words within the particular group. The labels are then shared with the whole class, and each group of students is asked to give reason for organizing and labeling the words in that particular way.

== Teacher's Role ==
The teacher is a guide to scaffolding students’ learning in several ways throughout in the LGL strategy. First, the teacher asks students to recall words and phrases that are associated with the given concept. Then, the teacher writes and reads the list of words generated, modeling the appropriate spelling and pronunciation. The teacher might also call attention to features of given words, such as root words or prefixes/suffixes, or to clarify a word’s meaning. Finally, the teacher facilitates discussion of the relationships between the words and phrases as students group the words. The teacher might also, in later use, add in some confusing terms for the students to discover. If the students are unable to see how these newly introduced words fit, the teacher can use this information to assess what needs additional instruction and what the students are comfortable with. When first introducing the LGL strategy to students, the teacher might model the process or parts of the process to scaffold students’ understanding. For instance, the teacher might have a list of words regarding another topic, form a group from the list, and label the group, telling why s/he chose that label.

== Additional Use ==
The LGL strategy was originally designed for and is often used to introduce vocabulary. Some teachers also use the LGL strategy to help struggling readers who either lack prior knowledge about a topic, or who might associate incorrect or irrelevant knowledge with the given subject. The LGL is then used by teachers to fill in the students’ missing information and focus them on prior knowledge that is relevant to the topic.
