= Glossary of education terms (M–O) =

This glossary of education-related terms is based on how they commonly are used in Wikipedia articles. This article contains terms starting with M – O. Select a letter from the table of contents to find terms on other pages.

== M ==
- Mastery learning: An instructional method that presumes all children can learn if they are provided with the appropriate learning conditions. Specifically, mastery learning is a method whereby students are not advanced to a subsequent learning objective until they demonstrate proficiency with the current one.
- Mathematics education: The study of practices and methods of both the teaching and learning of mathematics. Furthermore, mathematics educators are concerned with the development of tools that facilitate practice and/or the study of practice. Mathematics education has been a hotly debated subject in modern society. There is an ambiguity in the term for it refers both to these practices in classrooms around the world, but also to an emergent discipline with its own journals, conferences, etc. The main international body involved is the International Commission on Mathematical Instruction.
- Medical education: Education related to the practice of being a medical practitioner, either the initial training to become a doctor or further training thereafter.

Medical education and training varies considerably across the world. Various teaching methodologies have been utilised in medical education, which is an active area of educational research.

- Memory: The ability of the brain to store, retain, and subsequently recall information. Although traditional studies of memory began in the realms of philosophy, the late nineteenth and early twentieth century put memory within the paradigms of cognitive psychology. In the recent decades, it has become one of the principal pillars of a new branch of science that represents a marriage between cognitive psychology and neuroscience, called cognitive neuroscience.
- Mentoring: A developmental relationship between a more experienced mentor and a less experienced partner referred to as a mentee or protégé. Usually - but not necessarily - the mentor/protégé pair will be of the same sex.

The roots of the practice are lost in antiquity. The word itself was inspired by the character of Mentor in Homer's Odyssey. Though the actual Mentor in the story is a somewhat ineffective old man, the goddess Athena takes on his appearance in order to guide young Telemachus in his time of difficulty.
Historically significant systems of mentorship include apprenticing under the medieval guild system, and the discipleship system practiced by both Rabbinical Judaism and the Christian church.

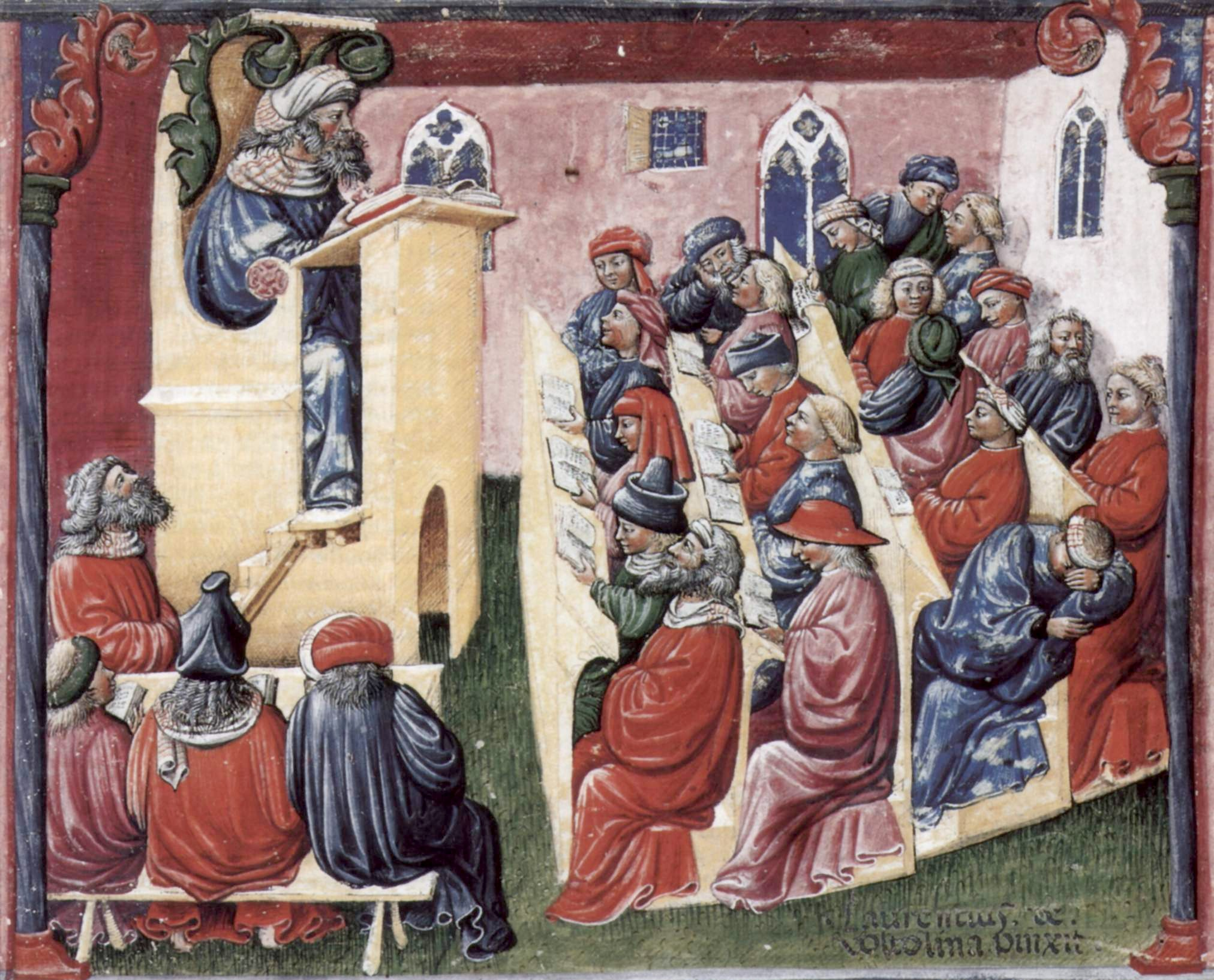
University (1350s).

- Medieval university: The first European medieval institutions generally considered to be universities were established in Italy, France and England in the late 11th and the 12th Century for the study of arts, law, medicine, and theology. These universities evolved from much older schools and monasteries, and it is difficult to define the first date at which they became true universities for teaching higher education, although the lists of studia generali for higher education in Europe held by the Vatican are a useful guide. Some other institutions such as the imperial university of Constantinople claim that they changed from schools to universities as early as the 11th Century.
- Medieval university (Asia): Medieval universities did not exist in Asia in the strict sense of the phrase. However, there were important centres of learning that can be compared to the universities of Europe. Unlike the European universities, non-western institutions of higher learning were never known to issue degrees to their graduates and therefore do not meet what many hold to be the technical definition of university. This does not, however, bar their importance to the history of non-western cultures.
- Meta-: In epistemology, the prefix meta- is used to mean about (its own category). For example, metadata is data about data (who has produced it, when, what format the data is in and so on). Similarly, meta-memory in psychology means an individual's intuition about whether or not they would remember something if they concentrated on recalling it. Any subject can be said to have a meta-theory, which is the theoretical consideration of its foundations and methods.
- Metacognition: Refers to thinking about cognition (memory, perception, calculation, association, etc.) itself. Metacognition can be divided into two types of knowledge: explicit, conscious, factual knowledge; and implicit, unconscious, procedural knowledge. The ability to think about thinking is unique to sapient species and indeed is one of the definitions of sapience. Metacognition is practiced to attempt to regulate one's own cognition, and maximize one's potential to think, learn and process stimuli from the surroundings.

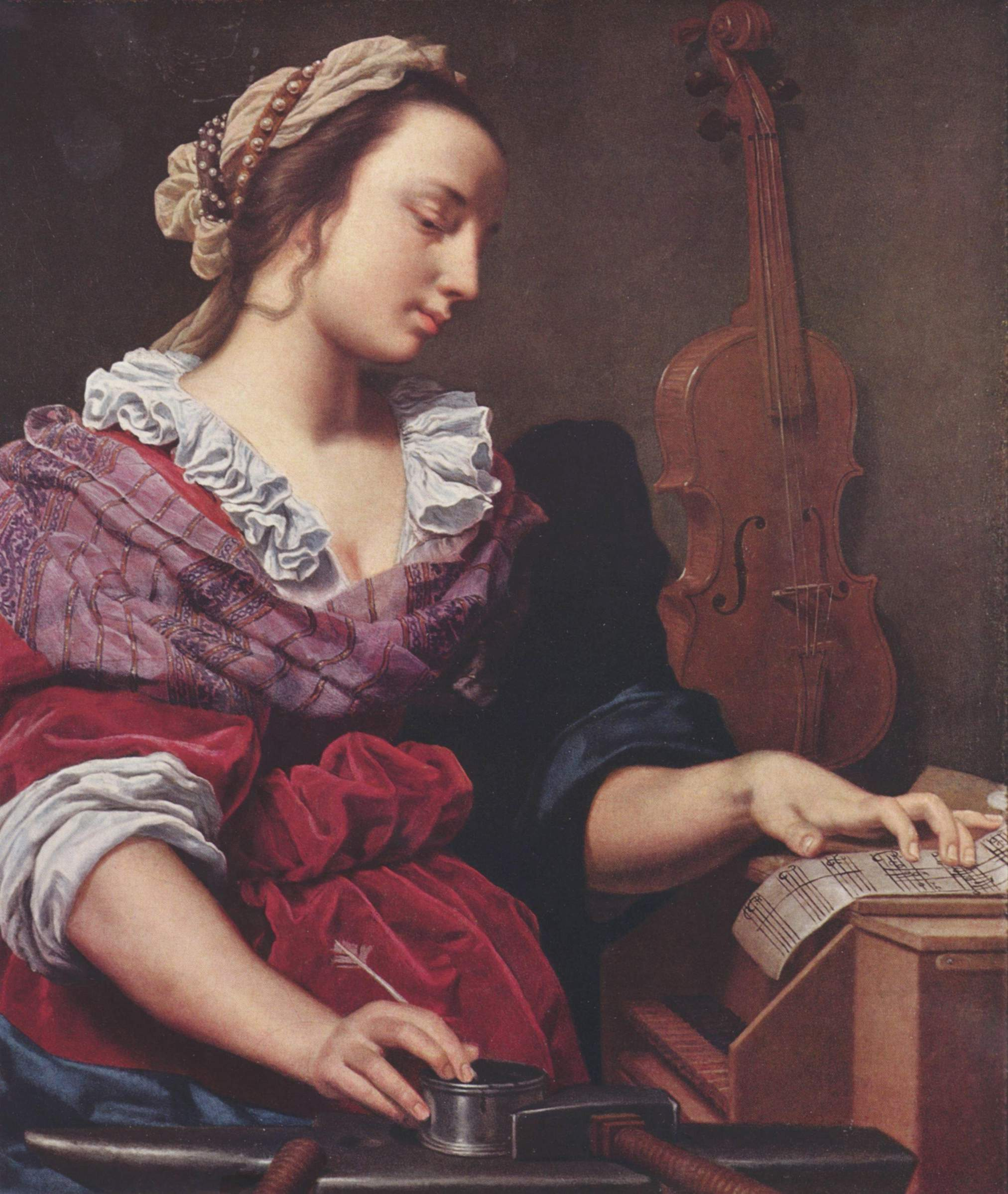
Allegory of Music, by Lorenzo Lippi

- Methodology: Strictly speaking is the study and knowledge of methods; but the term is frequently used pretentiously to indicate a method or a set of methods. In other words, it is the study of techniques for problem-solving and seeking answers, as opposed to the techniques themselves.
- Military education and training:Process that intends to educate in combat and in situations of war.
- Mind map: (or mind-map) A diagram used for linking words and ideas to a central key word or idea. It is used to visualize, classify, structure, and generate ideas, as well as an aid in study, problem solving, and decision making.
- Mind uploading The futurist high technology to rapidly increase the speed of information exchange to neurology. A form of education that focuses on extreme time efficiency.
- Motivation: The driving force behind all actions of human beings and other animals. It is an internal state that activates behavior and gives it direction. Emotion is closely related to motivation, and may be regarded as the subjectively experienced component of motivational states.
- Music education: Comprises the application of education methods in teaching music.

== N ==
- NAACP Legal Defense and Educational Fund, Inc.: (NAACP LDF or simply LDF) A leading United States civil rights organization. It was founded in 1940 under the leadership of Thurgood Marshall as part of the National Association for the Advancement of Colored People (NAACP) and spun out as a separate organization in 1957.
- National Educational Television: (NET) was an educational television network in the USA from 1952 until 1970 and was the predecessor of the Public Broadcasting Service.
- National postgraduate representative body: Exists in many countries representing postgraduate students/researchers undertaking their doctorate (PhD) or postdoctoral research. Some have a broader remit to represent all postgraduates, including those taking Master's degrees. A few countries have no specific body but are represented by a national body representing all students, including undergraduates. In Europe many of the national organisations have come together under the federation Eurodoc.
- Network of practice: Builds on the work on communities of practice by Jean Lave and Etienne Wenger in the early 1990s, John Seely Brown and Paul Duguid (2000) developed the concept of networks of practice (often abbreviated as NoPs). This concept refers to the overall set of various types of informal, emergent social networks that facilitate learning and knowledge sharing between individuals conducting practice-related tasks. In other words, networks of practice range from communities of practice to electronic networks of practice (often referred to as virtual or electronic communities).
- Nines System: The informal name for a grading scale often used at educational institutions in English-speaking countries, particularly the United States.

The system owes its name to the fact that each of the top four letter grades in it cover a range of nine points. The minimum passing mark under it is almost always 65%, or five points higher than in the more widely used Tens System.

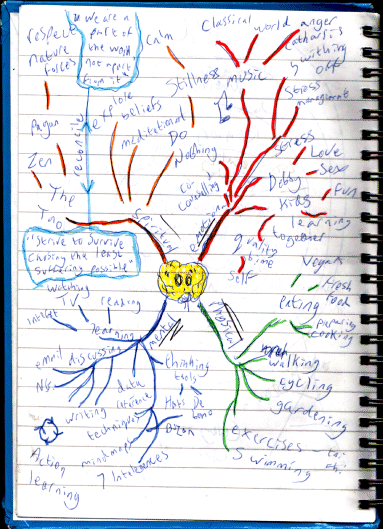
Notes on a mind map

- Normal school: An educational institution for training teachers. Its purpose is to establish teaching standards or norms, hence its name. The term normal school is now archaic in all but a few countries. In New Zealand, for example, normal schools are affiliated with Teachers colleges. According to the Oxford English Dictionary, normal schools in the United States and Canada trained primary school teachers, while in Europe, normal schools educated primary, secondary and tertiary-level teachers.
- Notetaking: The practice of writing pieces of information, often in an informal or unstructured manner. One major specific type of notetaking is the practice of writing in shorthand, which can allow large amounts of information to be put on paper very quickly. Notes are frequently written in notebooks, though any available piece of paper can suffice in many circumstances—some people are especially fond of Post-It notes, for instance. Notetaking is an important skill for students, especially at the college level. Many different forms are used to structure information and make it easier to find later. Computers, particularly tablet PCs and personal digital assistants (PDAs) are beginning to see wide use as notetaking devices.
- Numeracy: A term that emerged in the United Kingdom as a contraction of "numerical literacy". In the United States, it is somewhat better known as "Quantitative Literacy," and is familiar to math educators and intellectuals but not in the common usage. Innumeracy is the absence of numeracy.

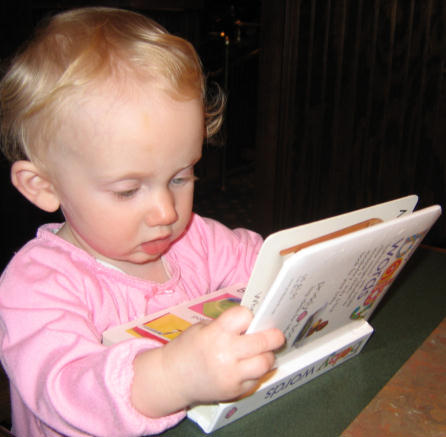
Young children learn very quickly.

- Nursery school: (or preschool) A school for the education of very young children (generally five years of age and younger). These schools range from schools which seek to teach young children to schools which only provide childcare with little educational benefits. Schools which focus on education generally teach early social skills including interpersonal interaction, being a part of a group of peers, and classroom skills such as following the instructions of a teacher. Some formal education also takes place, such as early reading or language skills. Some nursery schools have adopted specialized methods of teaching, such as Montessori, High Scope, Reggio Emilia approach and various other pedagogy.

== O ==
- Objective: An educational objective is a statement of a goal which successful participants are expected demonstrably to achieve before the course or unit completes.
- Objectivity (philosophy): Has various meanings in philosophy, and is surely one of the most important philosophical problems, since it concerns the epistemological status of knowledge, the problem of an objective reality and the question of our subjective relationship to others objects in the world.
- Obscurantism: Opposition to extension or dissemination of knowledge beyond certain limits and to questioning dogmas. Obscurantism is the opposite of freethought and is often associated with religious fundamentalism by its opponents. Indeed, it is a commonly raised accusation in debates on academic freedom, with anti-communists and others associating it with the philosophy of G. W. F. Hegel and his followers (including Karl Marx) and more recently with opponents of Martin Heidegger doing the same.
- Observation: An activity of a sapient or sentient living being, which senses and assimilates the knowledge of a phenomenon in its framework of previous knowledge and ideas.
- Observational learning: (or social learning) Learning that occurs as a function of observing, retaining and replicating behavior observed in others. It is most associated with the work of psychologist Albert Bandura, who implemented some of the seminal studies in the area and initiated social learning theory. Although observational learning can take place at any stage in life, it is thought to be particularly important during childhood, particularly as authority becomes important.
- Of Education: Published in 1644, first appearing anonymously as a single eight-page quarto sheet (Ainsworth 6). Presented as a letter written in response to a request from the Puritan educational reformer Samuel Hartlib, it represents John Milton's most comprehensive statement on educational reform, and gives voice to his views “concerning the best and noblest way of education”. As outlined in the tractate, education carried for Milton a dual objective: one public, to “fit a man to perform justly, skillfully, and magnanimously all the offices, both private and public, of peace and war”; and the other private, to “repair the ruins of our first parents by regaining to know God aright, and out of that knowledge to love Him, to be like Him, as we may the nearest by possessing our soul of true virtue”.
- Open problem: A problem that can be formally stated and for which a solution is known to exist but which has not yet been solved. It is common in graduate schools to point out open problems to students.
- Operant conditioning: (so named by psychologist B. F. Skinner) The modification of behavior brought about over time by the consequences of said behavior. Operant conditioning is distinguished from Pavlovian conditioning in that operant conditioning deals with voluntary behavior explained by its consequences, while Pavlovian conditioning deals with involuntary behavior triggered by its antecedents.

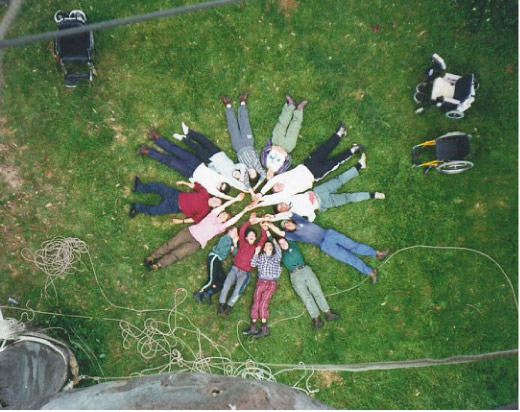
Participants on a ropes course.

- Outdoor education: (also known as adventure education) Usually refers to organized learning that takes place in the outdoors. Programs often involve residential or journey-based experiences in which students participate in a variety of adventurous challenges such as hiking, climbing, canoeing, ropes courses, and group games. Outdoor education programs draw upon the philosophy and theory of experiential education and may also focus on environmental education.
- Overlearning: A pedagogical concept according to which newly acquired skills should be practiced well beyond the point of initial mastery, leading to automaticity.
