= Applied academics =

Approach to learning and teaching

Applied academics is an approach to learning and teaching that focuses on how academic subjects (communications, mathematics, science, and basic literacy) can apply to the real world. Further, applied academics can be viewed as theoretical knowledge supporting practical applications.

== Definition ==
Applied Academics is an approach to learning which focuses on motivating and challenging students to connect what they learn with the world they experience and with what interests them. The basic premise is that if academic content is made more relevant, participatory and concrete, students learn better, retain more and apply learning in their lives. Teaching in this model uses hands-on innovative teaching methods sometimes called contextual learning. Teachers help students understand the reasons for studying their subject matter and capitalize on students' natural learning inclinations and problem-solving approaches they can use well beyond the classroom throughout their lives.

Applied Academics is an attempt to break from disconnected learning (where students go to different classes for different subjects for specified periods of time and don't gain a sense of the interconnectedness of learning) that has become a part of traditional approaches to education. This approach attempts to reintegrate learning by doing such things (for example) as teaching math, science, writing, or speech within other contexts such as a learning experience dealing with some form of technology training.

== Research in cognitive science ==
Research in cognitive science has shown that learners are not passive receptacles into which knowledge may be "poured". Learning occurs when the learner constructs, invents, and solves problems. Studies have shown that students taught theoretical principles, processes and skills in isolation without practice do not transfer these skills and knowledge as well to real life situations. Although "learning to know," "learning to do," and their "application" are often separated, there is no effective learning or understanding of one kind without the other two.

== Relating to the SCANS Competencies ==
In the United States the Secretary's Commission on Achieving Necessary Skills (SCANS) states that "good jobs require people who can put knowledge to work", and listed the knowledge (academics) that it considered critical for all students to possess.

These competencies include:

- Knowing how to effectively allocate time, money, materials, space, and staff
- The ability to work on a team, teach, serve customers, lead, negotiate and work with people from culturally diverse backgrounds
- Understanding how to effectively acquire, evaluate, and use data
- Understanding and ability to design and improve social, organizational, and technological systems
- The ability to effectively use technology

== Relating to action research ==
The concept of action research is related to Applied Academics, as one tenet of action research is to discover theory through practice, and then implement using the foundation of theory.
