= Outline of education =

Overview of and topical guide to education

The following outline is provided as an overview of and topical guide to education:

Education is the process of facilitating learning, or the acquisition of knowledge, skills, values, morals, beliefs, habits, and personal development.

== Participants in education ==
- Student – person enrolled in a school or other educational institution, or more generally, a person who takes a special interest in a subject.
- Parent (via parenting) – students' parents typically play a large role in teaching their children and overseeing their formal education, often including financing it.
- Teacher – person who helps students to acquire knowledge, competence, or virtue, via the practice of teaching.
  - Teacher's assistant – individual who assists a professor or teacher with instructional responsibilities.
  - Tutor – person who provides personalized assistance or tutelage to one or more people on certain subject areas or skills
  - Head teacher (Principal) – staff member of a school with the greatest responsibility[1] for the management of the school.
  - Professor – academic rank at universities and other post-secondary education and research institutions in most countries, usually denoting an expert in his/her field and a teacher of the highest rank
    - Associate professor – academic rank between assistant professor and a full professorship (North America)
    - Assistant professor – academic rank just below the rank of an associate professor used in universities or colleges, mainly in the United States, Canada, Japan, and South Korea.
    - Adjunct professor – bona-fide part-time non-tenure faculty member in an adjunct position at an institution of higher education.
    - Lecturer – academic rank in the commonwealth system, denoting a teaching position higher than that of the entry-level associate lecturer.
- Catechist
- School counselor
- School psychologist
- Principal (academia)
- Rector
- Dean
- Chancellor

== Education by country ==
- Classical Education
- Western education

== History of education ==
- History of education
- Category:History of education by country
- History of early childhood care and education
- History of higher education

== Educational philosophies ==
- Idealism
- Realism
- Theism
- Pragmatism
- Existentialism
- Critical theory
- Perennialism
- Classicism
- Essentialism
- Critical pedagogy
- Waldorf education
  - Democratic education
- Progressivism
- Unschooling
  - Criticism of schooling
- Contemplative education
- Humanistic education
- Critical thinking
- Constructivism
- Behaviorism
- Cognitivism
- Popular education
- Montessori education
- Compulsory education
- Traditional education – long-established customs that society has traditionally used in schools, where students obediently receive and believe knowledge communicated by teachers.

== Educational theory and practice ==
- Curriculum studies – field where researchers and educators examine how educational experiences are designed and organized to support meaningful learning
- Educational research – systematic collection and analysis of evidence and data related to various aspects of education including student learning, interaction, teaching methods, teacher training, and classroom dynamics.
- Instructional theory – study of how to design learning environments, methods, and materials in ways that facilitate learning
- Learning theory – describes how students receive, process, and retain knowledge during learning.

=== Pedogagical and instructional approaches ===
- Alternative education
- Instructional design
- Learning environment
- Learning space
- Learning community
- Learning styles
- Socialization

==== Teaching methods ====
Teaching method – set of principles and methods used by teachers to enable student learning.

- Collaborative learning – situation in which two or more people learn or attempt to learn something together.
- Context-based learning – use of real-life and fictitious examples in teaching environments in order to learn through the actual, practical experience with a subject
- Design-based learning – inquiry-based form of learning, or pedagogy, that is based on integration of design thinking and the design process into the classroom at the K-12 and post-secondary levels.
- Direct instruction – explicit teaching of a skill set using lectures or demonstrations of the material to students
- Evidence-based education – principle that education practices should be based on the best available scientific evidence, with randomised trials as the gold standard of evidence, rather than tradition, personal judgement, or other influences
- Experiential education – philosophy of education that describes the process that occurs between a teacher and student that infuses direct experience with the learning environment and content
- Experiential learning – process of learning through experience, and is more narrowly defined as "learning through reflection on doing"
- Homework set of tasks assigned to students by their teachers to be completed at home.
- Inquiry-based learning – form of active learning that starts by posing questions, problems or scenarios.
- Kinesthetic learning – learning that involves physical activity, preferring whole-body movement to process new and difficult information.
- Learning by teaching – method of teaching in which students are made to learn material and prepare lessons to teach it to the other students.
- Online learning community – public or private destination on the Internet that addresses its members' learning needs by facilitating peer-to-peer learning
- Open learning – activities that either enhance learning opportunities within formal education systems or broaden learning opportunities beyond formal education systems
- Open classroom – student-centered learning space design format, where large group of students of varying skill levels would be in a single, large classroom with several teachers overseeing them.
- Outcome-based education – educational theory that bases each part of an educational system around goals (outcomes)
- Outdoor education – organized learning that takes place in the outdoors, such as during school camping trips
- Personalized learning – efforts to tailor education to meet the different needs of students.
- Problem-based learning – teaching method in which students learn about a subject through the experience of solving an open-ended problem found in trigger material
- Problem-posing education – method of teaching that emphasizes critical thinking for the purpose of liberation, coined by Brazilian educator Paulo Freire
- Project-based learning – teaching method that involves a dynamic classroom approach in which it is believed that students acquire a deeper knowledge through active exploration of real-world challenges and problems
- Service-learning – educational approach that uses community service to meet both classroom learning objectives and societal needs
- Slow education – adaptive and non-standards based approaches to teaching
- Single-sex education – practice of conducting education with male and female students attending separate classes, buildings or schools
- Student-centred learning – methods of teaching that shift the focus of instruction from the teacher to the student, aiming to develop learner autonomy and independence
- Taxonomy of Educational Objectives (Bloom's Taxonomy) – framework for categorizing educational goals, developed by a committee of educators chaired by Benjamin Bloom in 1956

=== Educational materials, tools and technologies ===
- Curriculum
- Educational technology (the use of electronic educational technology is also called e-learning)
  - Educational animation
  - Educational robotics
  - Outline of open educational resources
- Instructional materials
  - Lesson plan
  - Textbook

== Types of educational goals and outcomes ==
There are many types of potential educational aims and objectives, irrespective of the specific subject being learned. Some can cross multiple school disciplines.

- Outline of educational aims

== Educational assessment, qualification and certification (for students) ==
- Educational assessment
  - Educational measurement
  - Psychometrics
- Types of test
- Test by purpose
  - Formative assessment
    - Diagnostic assessment
  - Assessment as learning
  - Summative assessment
    - High-stakes testing
  - Accountability assessment
  - Research
- Standardized test
- Assessment by way of comparison
  - Norm-referenced test
  - Criterion-referenced test
  - Ipsative test
- Assessment by mode
  - Paper-based
  - Oral
  - Electronic
  - Performance
  - Continuous observation
- Assessment by format
  - Essay
  - Multiple choice
  - Quiz
  - Portfolio
  - Practical considerations
- Grading in education
  - Grading systems by country
- List of primary and secondary school tests
- School leaving qualification
  - List of secondary school leaving qualifications
  - List of admission tests to colleges and universities

== Educational qualifications (for teachers) ==
- Teaching credential
  - Bachelor of Education
  - Master of Education
  - Doctor of Education

== Branches of education ==
=== Education by level or stage ===
Educational stage – subdivisions of formal learning

- Early childhood education – teaching of children (formally and informally) from birth up to the age of eight, traditionally equivalent of third grade.
  - Preschool – an educational establishment or learning space offering early childhood education to children before they begin compulsory education at primary school.
- Primary education – first stage of formal education, coming after preschool/kindergarten, often three to six years long
- Secondary education – stage of formal education that follows primary education, preparing students for higher education or the workforce
- Tertiary education – stage of formal education following the completion of secondary education
  - Vocational education – education that prepares people for a skilled craft in order to be gainfully employed or self-employed
  - Higher education – degree-level education provided in universities and colleges
  - Adult education – practice in which adults engage in systematic and sustained educating activities in order to gain new knowledge, skills, attitudes, or values

=== Education by funding and governance ===
- Public education
- Private education
- Homeschooling
- Autodidacticism

=== Education by subject, specialization or department ===
- List of education by subject
- List of academic disciplines

== Educational scholars and researchers ==
- Category:Educational personnel
  - Category:Educators
    - Category:Educators by discipline
  - Category:Educational administrators
- Category:Education writers
  - Category:Educational theorists
  - List of educational psychologists
  - Category:Educational psychologists
  - Category:Historians of education
  - Category:Philosophers of education
  - Category:Educational researchers
- Category:Education activists

== Educational research ==
- Educational research
- List of education journals
- Disciplinary approaches to educational research. Whereas much educational research is interdisciplinary and can focus on any topic on this page, some disciplines have long roots.
  - Anthropology
  - Measurement
  - Assessment
  - Comparative
  - Curriculum studies
  - Economics
  - Educational sciences
  - Gender
  - International education
  - Law and rights
  - Leadership
  - Management
  - Neuroscience
  - Policy
  - Politics
  - Process evaluation
  - Psychology
  - Sociology

In addition, research methods are drawn from many social research and psychological fields.

== Educational organizations ==
=== Types of educational institutions ===
- School – an institution designed for the teaching of students (or "pupils") under the direction of teachers. Most countries have systems of formal education (commonly compulsory), in which students progress through a series of schools. The names for these schools vary by country but generally include primary school for young children and secondary school for teenagers who have completed primary education. Non-compulsory higher education follows, and is taught in institutions called a college or university.

==== Specific schools ====
- List of schools
- Lists of universities and colleges

=== Associations ===
- Students' union
- Parent-Teacher Association
- International Association of Universities

=== Governmental organisations and agencies ===
- Department of Education
- Board of education
- UNESCO

=== Libraries ===
- Library – collection, or institution that provides a collection, of sources of information and similar resources, made accessible to a defined community for reference or borrowing. Among its purposes is to support the ongoing education of its members.

=== Types of libraries ===
- Academic library
- Archive
- Digital library
- National library
- Public library
- Research library
- Special library

=== Specific libraries ===
- List of libraries
  - List of national libraries

=== Museums ===
- Museum – an institution, the purpose of which is collect, preserve, interpret, and display items of artistic, cultural, or scientific significance for the education of the public.

==== Types of museums ====
- Archaeology museum
- Art museum
- Biographical museum
- Children's museum
- Design museum
- Encyclopedic museum
- Historic house museum
- History museum
- Living history museum
- Maritime museum
- Medical museum
- Memorial museum
- Mobile museum
- Natural history museum
- Open-air museum
- Science museum
- Virtual museum
- War museum
- Living museum
  - Zoological park
  - Botanic garden

== See also ==
- Education
- Career and technical education
- Category:Lists of education lists
- Glossary of education-related terms
- Index of education articles
- Outline of second-language acquisition
- Outline of academia
