= Educational essentialism =

Educational philosophy

Educational essentialism is an educational philosophy whose adherents believe that children should learn the traditional basic subjects thoroughly. In this philosophical school of thought, the aim is to instill students with the "essentials" of academic knowledge, enacting a back-to-basics approach. Essentialism ensures that the accumulated wisdom of our civilization as taught in the traditional academic disciplines is passed on from teacher to student. Such disciplines might include Reading, Writing, Literature, Foreign Languages, History, Mathematics, Classical Languages, Science, Art, and Music. Moreover, this traditional approach is meant to train the mind, promote reasoning, and ensure a common culture.

== Principles of essentialism ==
Essentialism is a relatively conservative stance to education that strives to teach students the knowledge of a society and civilization through a core curriculum. This core curriculum involves such areas that include; the study of the surrounding environment, basic natural laws, and the disciplines that promote a happier, more educated living. Other non-traditional areas are also integrated as well in moderation to balance the education. Essentialists' goals are to instill students with the "essentials" of academic knowledge, patriotism, and character development through traditional (or back-to-basic) approaches. This is to promote reasoning, train the mind, and ensure a common culture for all citizens.

Essentialism is the most typically enacted philosophy in American classrooms today. Traces of this can be found in the organized learning centered on teachers and textbooks, in addition to the regular assignments and evaluations.

=== Essentialism as a teacher-centered philosophy ===
The role of the teacher as the leader of the classroom is a very important tenet of Educational essentialism. The teacher is the center of the classroom, so they should be rigid and disciplinary. Establishing order in the classroom is crucial for student learning; effective teaching cannot take place in a loud and disorganized environment. It is the teacher's responsibility to keep order in the classroom. The teacher must interpret essentials of the learning process, take the leadership position and set the tone of the classroom. These needs require an educator who is academically well-qualified with an appreciation for learning and development. The teacher must control the students with distributions of rewards and penalties. It has been argued that recent teacher education policies in some countries extend essentialism to teacher education policy frameworks.

== History of essentialism ==
The Essentialist movement first began in the United States in the year 1938. In Atlantic City, New Jersey, a group met for the first time called "The Essentialist's Committee for the Advancement of Education." Their emphasis was to reform the educational system to a rationality-based system.

The term essentialist first appeared in the book An Introduction to the Philosophy of Education which was written by Michael John Demiashkevich. In his book, Demiashkevich labels some specific educators (including William C. Bagley) as “essentialists." Demiashkevich compared the essentialists to the different viewpoints of the Progressive Education Association. He described how the Progressives preached a “hedonistic doctrine of change” whereas the essentialists stressed the moral responsibility of man for his actions and looked toward permanent principles of behavior (Demiashkevich likened the arguments to those between the Socratics and the Sophists in Greek philosophy). In 1938 Bagley and other educators met together where Bagley gave a speech detailing the main points of the essentialism movement and attacking the public education in the United States. One point that Bagley noted was that students in the U.S. were not getting an education on the same levels as students in Europe who were the same age.

A recent branch has emerged within the essentialist school of thought called "neoessentialism." Emerging in the eighties as a response to the essentialist ideals of the thirties as well as to the criticism of the fifties and the advocates for education in the seventies, neoessentialism was created to try to appease the problems facing the United States at the time. The most notable change within this school of thought is that it called for the creation of a new discipline, computer science.

=== Renowned essentialists ===
William Bagley (1874–1946) was an important historical essentialist. William C. Bagley completed his undergraduate degree at Michigan Agricultural College in 1895. It wasn't until after finishing his undergraduate studies that he truly wanted to be a teacher. Bagley did his Graduate studies at the University of Chicago and at Cornell University. He acquired his Ph.D. in 1900, after which he took his first school job as a Principal in a St. Louis, Missouri Elementary School. Bagley's devotion increased during his work at Montana State Normal School in Dillon, Montana. It was here where he decided to dedicate his time to the education of teachers and where he published The Educative Process, launching his name across the nation. Throughout his career Bagley argued against the conservative position that teachers were not in need of special training for their work. He believed that liberal arts material was important in teacher education. Bagley also believed the dominant theories of education of the time were weak and lacking.

In April 1938, he published the Essentialist's Platform, in which he outlined three major points of essentialism. He described the right of students to a well-educated and culturally knowledgeable teacher. Secondly, he discussed the importance of teaching the ideals of community to each group of students. Lastly, Bagley wrote of the importance of accuracy, thoroughness and effort on the part of the student in the classroom.

Another important essentialist is E. D. Hirsch (1928-). Hirsch was Founder and Chairman of the Core Knowledge Foundation and authored several books concerning fact-based approaches to education. Now retired, he spent many years teaching at the University of Virginia while also being an advocate for the "back to basics" movement. In his most popular book, Cultural Literacy — What Every American Needs To Know, he offers lists, quotations, and information regarding what he believes is essential knowledge.

See also Arthur Bestor.

== Schools enacting an essentialist curriculum ==
The Core Knowledge Schools were founded on the philosophy of essentialist E.D. Hirsch. Although it is difficult to maintain a pure and strict essentialist-only curriculum, these schools have the central aim of establishing a common knowledge base for all citizens. To do so, they follow a nationwide, content-specific, and teacher-centered curriculum. The Core Knowledge curriculum also allows for local variance above and beyond the core curriculum. Central curricular aims are academic excellence and the learning of knowledge, and teachers who are masters of their knowledge areas serve this aim.

== Criticism of essentialism ==
Because Essentialism is largely teacher-centered, the role of the student is often called into question. Presumably, in an essentialist classroom, the teacher is the one designing the curriculum for the students based upon the core disciplines. Moreover, he or she is enacting the curriculum and setting the standards which the students must meet. The teacher's evaluative role may undermine students' interest in study. As a result, the students begin to take on more of a passive role in their education as they are forced to meet and learn such standards and information.

Furthermore, there is also speculation that an essentialist education helps in promoting the cultural lag. This philosophy of education is very traditional in the mindset of passing on the knowledge of the culture via the academic disciplines. Thus, students are forced to think in the mindset of the larger culture, and individual creativity, and subversive investigation are often not emphasized, or even outright discouraged.

== See also ==
- Educational perennialism
