= George Washington Academy (St. George, Utah) =

George Washington Academy - St. George
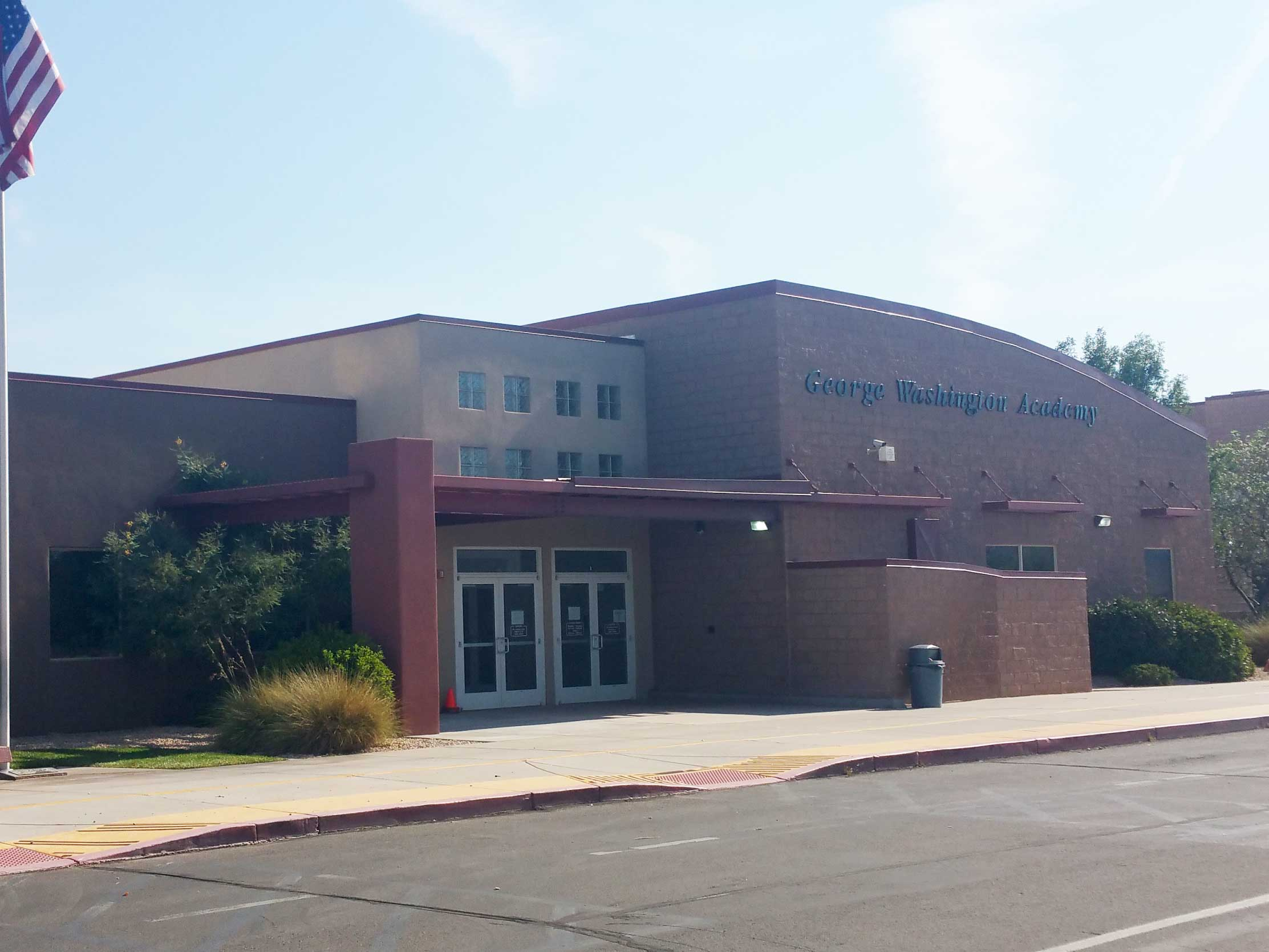

Location
- 2277 South 3000 East; St. George, Washington, Utah 84790; United States
- 37.06971°N 113.52171°W

Information
- Type: Public, charter
- Motto: "Building a Strong Foundation"
- Established: 2006
- School district: George Washington Academy
- Authorizer: Utah State Charter School Board
- Principal: Blake Clark
- Faculty: 54
- Grades: Kindergarten (K) thru Eighth Grade (8th)
- Enrollment: 995 (2020-2021)
- Colors: Navy, maroon, white
- Website: Official Website

George Washington Academy (GWA), is a public charter school in St. George, Utah. It opened in 2006 and now serves over 1000 students in grades K-7.

== History ==
GWA was founded in 2006 with 414 enrolled students, grades K-7. In 2013 and 2021 it was named Utah Charter school of the year and in 2017 became one of eight schools in Utah to receive an official state STEM designation. As of 2019 GWA has 1010 enrolled students and is consistently named one of the top academic performing schools in the state of Utah.

== Curriculum ==
GWA utilizes the Core Knowledge Sequence created by E.D. Hirsch for science, social studies, health, history, geography, music, and visual arts. The school teaches Saxon Math and utilize the Spalding Method for Language Arts and Spelling. GWA is an accredited "7 Habits" school and in an effort to develop the "whole student" utilizes a character education program as a "critical component" of the school curriculum.

== Awards and recognition ==
- 2013, Named Charter School of the Year by the Utah Association of Public Charter Schools (UAPCS)
- 2016, Recognized as a top performing charter school by the National Alliance for Public Charter Schools
- 2016, Awarded $10,000 from GoFundMe for winning a national fundraising competition in which the school raised $19,000 in 30 days for an outdoor facility and science lab
- 2017, Granted an official STEM designation by the Utah Board of Education
