= Philosophy of education =

Study of nature and aims of education

The philosophy of education is the branch of applied philosophy that investigates the nature of education as well as its aims and problems. It also examines the concepts and presuppositions of education theories. It is an interdisciplinary field that draws inspiration from various disciplines both within and outside philosophy, like ethics, political philosophy, psychology, and sociology. Many of its theories focus specifically on education in schools but it also encompasses other forms of education. Its theories are often divided into descriptive theories, which provide a value-neutral description of what education is, and normative theories, which investigate how education should be practiced.

A great variety of topics are discussed in the philosophy of education. Some studies provide a conceptual analysis of the fundamental concepts of education. Others center around the aims or purpose of education, like passing on knowledge and the development of the abilities of good reasoning, judging, and acting. An influential discussion concerning the epistemic aims of education is whether education should focus mainly on the transmission of true beliefs or rather on the abilities to reason and arrive at new knowledge. In this context, many theorists emphasize the importance of critical thinking in contrast to indoctrination. Another debate about the aims of education is whether the primary beneficiary is the student or the society to which the student belongs.

Many of the more specific discussions in the philosophy of education concern the contents of the curriculum. This involves the questions of whether, when, and in what detail a certain topic, like sex education or religion, should be taught. Other debates focus on the specific contents and methods used in moral, art, and science education. Some philosophers investigate the relation between education and power, often specifically regarding the power used by modern states to compel children to attend school. A different issue is the problem of the equality of education and factors threatening it, like discrimination and unequal distribution of wealth. Some philosophers of education promote a quantitative approach to educational research, which follows the example of the natural sciences by using wide experimental studies. Others prefer a qualitative approach, which is closer to the methodology of the social sciences and tends to give more prominence to individual case studies.

Various schools of philosophy have developed their own perspective on the main issues of education. Existentialists emphasize the role of authenticity while pragmatists give particular prominence to active learning and discovery. Feminists and postmodernists often try to uncover and challenge biases and forms of discrimination present in current educational practices. Other philosophical movements include perennialism, classical education, essentialism, critical pedagogy, and progressivism. The history of the philosophy of education started in ancient philosophy but only emerged as a systematic branch of philosophy in the latter half of the 20th century.

== Definition ==
The philosophy of education is the branch of philosophy that examines the nature, aims, and problems of education. As the philosophical study of education, it investigates its topic similar to how other discipline-specific branches of philosophy, like the philosophy of science or the philosophy of law, study their topics. A central task for the philosophy of education is to make explicit the various fundamental assumptions and disagreements at work in its field and to evaluate the arguments raised for and against the different positions. The issue of education has a great many manifestations in various fields. Because of this, both the breadth and the influence of the philosophy of education are significant and wide-ranging, touching many other branches of philosophy, such as ethics, political philosophy, epistemology, metaphysics, and philosophy of mind. Its theories are often formulated from the perspective of these other philosophical disciplines. But due to its interdisciplinary nature, it also attracts contributions from scholars belonging to fields outside the domain of philosophy.

While there is wide agreement on the general topics discussed in the philosophy of education, it has proven difficult to give a precise definition of it. The philosophy of education belongs mainly to applied philosophy. According to some definitions, it can be characterized as an offshoot of ethics. But not everyone agrees with this characterization since the philosophy of education has a more theoretical side as well, which includes the examination of the fundamental concepts and theories of education as well as their philosophical implications. These two sides are sometimes referred to as the outward and the inward looking nature of the philosophy of education. Its topics can range from very general questions, like the nature of the knowledge worth teaching, to more specific issues, like how to teach art or whether public schools should implement standardized curricula and testing.

The problem of education was already an important topic in ancient philosophy and has remained so to the present day. But it only emerged as a distinct branch of philosophy in the latter half of the 20th century, when it became the subject of a systematic study and analysis. The term "education" can refer either to the process of educating or to the field of study investigating education as this process. This ambiguity is also reflected on the level of the philosophy of education, which encompasses the study of the philosophical presuppositions and issues both of education as a process and as a discipline. Many works in the philosophy of education focus explicitly or implicitly on the education happening in schools. But in its widest sense, education takes place in various other fields as well, such as at home, in libraries, in museums, or in the public media. Different types of education can be distinguished, such as formal and informal education or private and public education.

== Subdivisions ==
Different subdivisions of the philosophy of education have been suggested. One categorization distinguishes between descriptive and normative issues. Descriptive theories aim to describe what education is and how to understand its related concepts. This includes also epistemological questions, which ask not whether a theory about education is true or false, but how one can arrive at the knowledge to answer such questions. Normative theories, on the other hand, try to give an account of how education should be practiced or what is the right form of education. Some normative theories are built on a wider ethical framework of what is right or good and then arrive at their educational normative theories by applying this framework to the practice of education. But the descriptive and the normative approaches are intertwined and cannot always be clearly separated since descriptive findings often directly imply various normative attitudes.

Another categorization divides topics in the philosophy of education into the nature and aims of education on the one hand, and the methods and circumstances of education on the other hand. The latter section may again be divided into concrete normative theories and the study of the conceptual and methodological presuppositions of these theories. Other classifications additionally include areas for topics such as the role of reasoning and morality as well as issues pertaining to social and political topics and the curriculum.

The theories within the philosophy of education can also be subdivided based on the school of philosophy they belong to. Various schools of philosophy, such as existentialism, pragmatism, Marxism, postmodernism, and feminism, have developed their own perspective on the main issues of education. They often include normative theories about how education should or should not be practiced and are in most cases controversial.

Another approach is to simply list all topics discussed in the philosophy of education. Among them are the issues and presuppositions concerning sex education, science education, aesthetic education, religious education, moral education, multicultural education, professional education, theories of teaching and learning, the measurement of learning, knowledge and its value, cultivating reason, epistemic and moral aims of education, authority, fallibilism, and fallibility.

Finally, yet another way that philosophy of education is often tacitly divided is in terms of western versus non-western and "global south" perspectives. For many generations, philosophy of education has maintained a relatively ethnocentric orientation, with little attention paid to ideas from outside Europe and North America, but this is starting to change in the 21st century due to decolonization and related movements.

== Main topics ==
=== Fundamental concepts of education ===
The starting point of many philosophical inquiries into a field is the examination and clarification of the fundamental concepts used in this field, often in the form of conceptual analysis. This approach is particularly prominent in the analytic tradition. It aims to make ambiguities explicit and to uncover various implicit and potentially false assumptions associated with these terms.

Theorists in this field often emphasize the importance of this form of investigation since all subsequent work on more specific issues already has to assume at least implicitly what their central terms mean to demarcate their field. For example, in order to study what constitutes good education, one has to have a notion of what the term "education" means and how to achieve, measure, and evaluate it. Definitions of education can be divided into thin and thick definitions. Thin definitions are neutral and descriptive. They usually emphasize the role of the transmission of knowledge and understanding in education. Thick definitions include additional normative components, for example, by stating that the process in question has to have certain positive results to be called education. According to one thick definition, education means that the person educated has acquired knowledge and intellectual skills, values these factors, and has thus changed for the better. These characteristics can then be used to distinguish education from other closely related terms, such as "indoctrination". Other fundamental notions in the philosophy of education include the concepts of teaching, learning, student, schooling, and rearing.

=== Aims of education ===
A central question in the philosophy of education concerns the aims of education: why people should be educated and what goals should be pursued. This question is relevant for evaluating educational practices and curricula by assessing how well they achieve these aims. Theories about the aims of education vary, reflecting different philosophical, social, and cultural perspectives. Some suggest that education should foster knowledge, curiosity, creativity, rationality, critical thinking, and moral development. Others emphasize the development of social and civic qualities, including community, solidarity, and responsible participation in society. Certain approaches focus on individual development, such as self-actualization and the realization of personal potential, while other perspectives stress conformity, obedience to authority, or adherence to specific ideological or religious principles. Discussions of these aims often draw on other disciplines, including ethics, psychology, anthropology, and sociology.

There is wide consensus concerning certain general aims of education, like that it should foster all students, help them in the development of their ability to reason, and guide them in how to judge and act. But these general characteristics are usually too vague to be of much help and there are many disagreements about the more specific suggestions of what education should aim for. Some attempts have been made to provide an overarching framework of these different aims. According to one approach, education should at its core help the individual lead a good life. All the different more specific goals are aims of education to the extent that they serve this ultimate purpose. On this view, it may be argued that fostering rationality and autonomy in the students are aims of education to the extent that increased rationality and autonomy will result in the student leading a better life.

The different theories of the aims of education are sometimes divided into goods-based, skills-based, and character-based accounts. Goods-based accounts hold that the ultimate aim of education is to produce some form of epistemic good, such as truth, knowledge, and understanding. Skills-based accounts, on the other hand, see the development of certain skills, like rationality as well as critical and independent thinking as the goal of education. For character-based accounts, the character traits or virtues of the learner play the central role, often with an emphasis on moral and civic traits like kindness, justice, and honesty.

==== Epistemic ====
Many theories emphasize the epistemic aims of education. According to the epistemic approach, the central aim of education has to do with knowledge, for example, to pass on knowledge accumulated in the societal effort from one generation to the next. This process may be seen both as the development of the student's mind as well as the transmission of a valuable heritage. Such an approach is sometimes rejected by pragmatists, who emphasize experimentation and critical thinking over the transmission of knowledge. Others have argued that this constitutes a false dichotomy: that the transmission of knowledge and the development of a rational and critical mind are intertwined aims of education that depend on and support each other. In this sense, education aims also at fostering the ability to acquire new knowledge. This includes both instilling true beliefs in the students as well as teaching the methods and forms of evidence responsible for verifying existing beliefs and arriving at new knowledge. It promotes the epistemic autonomy of students and may help them challenge unwarranted claims by epistemic authorities. In its widest sense, the epistemic approach includes various related goals, such as imparting true beliefs or knowledge to the students as well as teaching dispositions and abilities, such as rationality, critical thinking, understanding, and other intellectual virtues.

==== Critical thinking and indoctrination ====
Critical thinking is often cited as one of the central aims of education. There is no generally accepted definition of critical thinking. But there is wide agreement that it is reasonable, reflective, careful, and focused on determining what to believe or how to act. It has clarity and rationality as its standards and includes a metacognitive component monitoring not just the solution of the problem at hand but also ensuring that it complies with its own standards in the process. In this sense, education is not just about conveying many true beliefs to the students. Instead, the students' ability to arrive at conclusions by themselves and the disposition to question pre-existing beliefs should also be fostered, often with the goal of benefitting not just the student but society at large. But not everyone agrees with the positive role ascribed to critical thinking in education. Objections are often based on disagreements about what it means to reason well. Some critics argue that there is no universally correct form of reasoning. According to them, education should focus more on teaching subject-specific skills and less on imparting a universal method of thinking. Other objections focus on the allegation that critical thinking is not as neutral, universal, and presuppositionless as some of its proponents claim. On this view, it involves various implicit biases, like egocentrism or distanced objectivity, and culture-specific values arising from its roots in the philosophical movement of the European Enlightenment.

The problem of critical thinking is closely connected to that of indoctrination. Many theorists hold that indoctrination is in important ways different from education and should be avoided in education. But others contend that indoctrination should be part of education or even that there is no difference between the two. These different positions depend a lot on how "indoctrination" is to be defined. Most definitions of indoctrination agree that its goal is to get the student to accept and embrace certain beliefs. It has this in common with most forms of education but differs from it in other ways. According to one definition, the belief acquisition in indoctrination happens without regard for the evidential support of these beliefs, i.e. without presenting proper arguments and reasons for adopting them. According to another, the beliefs are instilled in such a way as to discourage the student to question or assess for themselves the believed contents. In this sense, the goals of indoctrination are exactly opposite to other aims of education, such as rationality and critical thinking. In this sense, education tries to impart not just beliefs but also make the students more open-minded and conscious of human fallibility. An intimately related issue is whether the aim of education is to mold the mind of the pupil or to liberate it by strengthening its capacity for critical and independent inquiry.

An important consequence of this debate concerns the problem of testimony, i.e to what extent students should trust the claims of teachers and books. It has been argued that this issue depends a lot on the age and the intellectual development of the student. In the earlier stages of education, a high level of trust on the side of the students may be necessary. But the more their intellectual capacities develop, the more they should use them when trying to assess the plausibility of claims and the reasons for and against them. In this regard, it has been argued that, especially for young children, weaker forms of indoctrination may be necessary while they still lack the intellectual capacities to evaluate the reasons for and against certain claims and thus to critically assess them. In this sense, one can distinguish unavoidable or acceptable forms of indoctrination from their avoidable or unacceptable counterparts. But this distinction is not always affirmed and some theorists contend that all forms of indoctrination are bad or unacceptable.

==== Individual and society ====
A recurrent source of disagreement about the aims of education concerns the question of who is the primary beneficiary of education: the individual educated or the society having this individual as its member. In many cases, the interests of both are aligned. On the one hand, many new opportunities in life open to the individual through education, especially concerning their career. On the other hand, education makes it more likely that the person becomes a good, law-abiding, and productive member of society. But this issue becomes more problematic in cases where the interests of the individual and society conflict with each other. This poses the question of whether individual autonomy should take precedence over communal welfare. According to comprehensive liberals, for example, education should emphasize the self-directedness of the students. On this view, it is up to the student to choose their own path in life. The role of education is to provide them with the necessary resources but it does not direct the student with respect to what constitutes an ethically good path in life. This position is usually rejected by communitarians, who stress the importance of social cohesion by being part of the community and sharing a common good.

=== Curriculum ===
An important and controversial issue in the philosophy of education concerns the contents of the curriculum, i.e. the question of what should be taught to students. This includes both the selection of subjects to be taught and the consideration of arguments for and against the inclusion of a particular topic. This issue is intimately tied to the aims of education: one may argue that a certain subject should be included in the curriculum because it serves one of the aims of education.

While many positions about what subjects to include in the curriculum are controversial, some particular issues stand out where these controversies go beyond the academic discourse to a wide public discourse, like questions about sexual and religious education. Controversies in sex education involve both biological aspects, such as the functioning of sex organs, and social aspects, such as sexual practices and gender identities. Disagreements in this area concern which aspects are taught and in which detail as well as to which age groups these teachings should be directed. Debates on religious education include questions like whether religion should be taught as a distinct subject and, if so, whether it should be compulsory. Other questions include which religion or religions should be taught and to what degree religious views should influence other topics, such as ethics or sex education.

Another prominent topic in this field concerns the subject of moral education. This field is sometimes referred to as "educational ethics". Disagreements in this field concern which moral beliefs and values should be taught to the students. This way, many of the disagreements in moral philosophy are reflected in the field of moral education. Some theorists in the Kantian tradition emphasize the importance of moral reasoning and enabling children to become morally autonomous agents who can tell right from wrong. Theorists in the Aristotelian tradition, on the other hand, focus more on moral habituation through the development of virtues that concern both perception, affect, and judgment in regard to moral situations. A related issue, heavily discussed in ancient philosophy, is the extent to which morality can be taught at all instead of just being an inborn disposition.

Various discussions also concern the role of art and aesthetics in public education. It has been argued that the creativity learned in these areas can be applied to various other fields and may thereby benefit the student in various ways. It has been argued that aesthetic education also has indirect effects on various other issues, such as shaping the student's sensibilities in the fields of morality and politics as well as heightening their awareness of self and others.

Some researchers reject the possibility of objectivity in general. They use this claim to argue against universal forms of education, which they see as hiding particular worldviews, beliefs, and interests under a false cover. This is sometimes utilized to advance an approach focused on more diversity, for example, by giving more prominence in education to the great variety of cultures, customs, languages, and lifestyles without giving preference to any of them.

Different approaches to solving these disputes are employed. In some cases, psychology in the field of child development, learning, and motivation can provide important general insights. More specific questions about the curriculum of a particular subject, such as mathematics, are often strongly influenced by the philosophy of this specific discipline, such as the philosophy of mathematics.

=== Power ===
The problem of power is another issue in the philosophy of education. Of specific interest on this topic is that the modern states compel children to attend school, so-called compulsory education. The modern system of compulsory education in many countries has historical roots in the 18th- and 19th-century Prussian education system, which emphasized uniformity, obedience, and preparation for industrial and military needs. Gatto argues that this system was designed not primarily for the intellectual or moral development of children, but to produce compliant citizens and efficient workers, embedding social hierarchies and state authority into the educational process. This historical perspective informs contemporary critiques of compulsory education, including those associated with deschooling and unschooling movements. The children and their parents usually have few to no ways of opting out or changing the established curriculum. An important question in this respect is why or whether modern states are justified to use this form of power. For example, various liberationist movements belonging to the fields of deschooling and unschooling reject this power and argue that the children's welfare is best served in the absence of compulsory schooling in general. This is sometimes based on the idea that the best form of learning does not happen while studying but instead occurs as a side-effect while doing something else. This position is often rejected by pointing out that it is based on overly optimistic presuppositions about the children's natural and unguided development of rationality. While some objections focus on compulsory education in general, a less radical and more common criticism concerns specific compulsory topics in the curriculum, for example, in relation to sexuality or religion. Another contemporary debate in the United States concerns the practice of standardized testing: it has been argued that this discriminates against certain racial, cultural, or religious minorities since the standardized test may implicitly assume various presuppositions not shared by these minorities. Other issues in relation to power concern the authority and responsibility teachers have towards their students.

Postmodern theorists often see established educational practices as instruments of power used by elites in society to further their own interests. Important aspects in this regard are the unequal power relation between the state and its institutions in contrast to the individual as well as the control that can thus be employed due to the close connection between power and knowledge, specifically the knowledge passed on through education.

=== Equality ===
A recurrent demand on public education is that all students should be treated equally and in a fair manner. One reason for this demand is that education plays a central role for the child's path and prospects in life, which should not be limited by unfair or arbitrary external circumstances. But there are various disagreements about how this demand is best understood and whether it is applicable in all cases. An initial problem concerns what is meant by "equality". In the field of education, it is often understood as equality of opportunity. In this sense, the demand for equality implies that education should open the same opportunities to everyone. This means, among other things, that students from higher social classes should not enjoy a competitive advantage over others. One difficulty with this demand, when understood in a wide sense, is that there are many sources of educational inequality and it is not always in the best interest to eliminate all of them. For example, parents who are concerned with their young children's education may read them bedtime stories early on and thereby provide them with a certain advantage over other children who do not enjoy this privilege. But disallowing such practices to level the field would have serious negative side-effects. A weaker position on this issue does not demand full equality but holds instead that educational policies should ensure that certain factors, like race, native language, and disabilities, do not pose obstacles to the equality of opportunity.

A closely related topic is whether all students, both high and low performers, should be treated equally. According to some, more resources should be dedicated to low performers, to help them get to an average level, while others recommend a preferential treatment for high performers in order to help them fully develop their exceptional abilities and thereby benefit society at large. A similar problem is the issue of specialization. It concerns the question of whether all students should follow the same curriculum or to what extent they should specialize early on in specific fields according to their interests and skills.

Marxist critiques of the school systems in capitalist societies often focus on the inequality they cause by sorting students for different economic positions. While overtly this process happens based on individual effort and desert, they argue that this just masks and reinforces the underlying influence of the preexisting social class structure. This is sometimes integrated into a wider Marxist perspective on society which holds that education in capitalist societies plays the role of upholding this inequality and thereby reproduces the capitalist relations of production.

Other criticisms of the dominant paradigms in education are often voiced by feminist and postmodern theorists. They usually point to alleged biases and forms of discrimination present in current practices that should be eliminated. Feminists often hold that traditional education is overly man-oriented and thereby oppresses women in some form. This bias was present to severe degrees in earlier forms of education and a lot of progress has been made towards more gender-equal forms of education. Nonetheless, feminists often contend that certain problems still persist in contemporary education. Some argue, for example, that this manifests itself in the prominence given to cognitive development in education, which is said to be associated primarily with masculinity in contrast to a more feminine approach based on emotion and intuition. A related criticism holds that there is an overemphasis on abilities belonging to the public sphere, like reason and objectivity, in contrast to equally important characteristics belonging to the private sphere, like compassion and empathy.

=== Epistemology ===
The philosophy of education is also interested in the epistemology of education. This term is often used to talk about the epistemic aims of education, i.e. questions like whether educators should aim at transmitting justified true beliefs rather than merely true beliefs or should additionally foster other epistemic virtues like critical thinking. In a different sense, the epistemology of education concerns the issue of how we arrive at knowledge on educational matters. This is especially relevant in the field of educational research, which is an active field of investigation with many studies being published on a regular basis. It is also quite influential in regard to educational policy and practice. Epistemological questions in this field concern the objectivity of its insights.

An important methodological divide in this area, often referred to as the "paradigm wars", is between the quantitative or statistical approach in contrast to the qualitative or ethnographical approach. The quantitative approach usually focuses on wide experimental studies and employs statistical methods to uncover the general causal factors responsible for educational phenomena. It has been criticized based on the claim that its method, which is inspired by the natural sciences, is inappropriate for understanding the complex cultural and motivational patterns investigated by the social sciences. The qualitative approach, on the other hand, gives more weight to particular case studies for reaching its conclusions. Its opponents hold that this approach lacks the methodological rigor to arrive at well-warranted knowledge. The mixed-method research is a recent contemporary approach in which the methods of both camps are combined. The question of the most promising approach is relevant to how funding budgets are spent on research, which in its turn has important implications for policymaking.

=== Others ===
One question concerns how the learners are to be conceptualized. John Locke sees the mind as a blank slate or a tabula rasa that passively absorbs information and is filled with contents through experience. This view contrasts with a more pragmatist perspective, which in its emphasis on practice sees students not as passive absorbers but as active learners that should be encouraged to discover and learn things by themselves.

Another disputed topic is the role of testing in public education. Some theorists have argued that it is counterproductive since it puts undue pressure on the students. But testing also plays various critical roles, such as providing feedback on the learning progress both to the student, their parents, and their teachers. Concrete discussions on the role of testing often focus less on whether it should be done at all and more on how much importance should be ascribed to the test results. This also includes questions about the form of testing, for example, whether it should be standardized. Standardized tests present the same questions and scoring system to all students taking the test and are often motivated by a desire for objective and fair evaluations both of students and schools. Opponents have argued that this approach tends to favor certain social groups over others and severely limits the creativity and effectiveness of teachers.

== Philosophical movements ==
=== Existentialist ===
The existentialist sees the world as one's personal subjectivity, where goodness, truth, and reality are individually defined. Reality is a world of existing, truth subjectively chosen, and goodness a matter of freedom. The subject matter of existentialist classrooms should be a matter of personal choice. Teachers view the individual as an entity within a social context in which the learner must confront others' views to clarify his or her own. Character development emphasizes individual responsibility for decisions. Real answers come from within the individual, not from outside authority. Examining life through authentic thinking involves students in genuine learning experiences. Existentialists are opposed to thinking about students as objects to be measured, tracked, or standardized. Such educators want the educational experience to focus on creating opportunities for self-direction and self-actualization. They start with the student, rather than on curriculum content.

=== Perennialism ===
Perennialists believe that one should teach the things that one deems to be of everlasting importance to all people everywhere. They believe that the most important topics develop a person. Since details of fact change constantly, these cannot be the most important. Therefore, one should teach principles, not facts. Since people are human, one should teach first about humans, not machines or techniques. Since people are people first, and workers second if at all, one should teach liberal topics first, not vocational topics. The focus is primarily on teaching reasoning and wisdom rather than facts, the liberal arts rather than vocational training.

=== Classical education ===
The Classical education movement advocates a form of education based in the traditions of Western culture, with a particular focus on education as understood and taught in the Middle Ages. The term "classical education" has been used in English for several centuries, with each era modifying the definition and adding its own selection of topics. By the end of the 18th century, in addition to the trivium and quadrivium of the Middle Ages, the definition of a classical education embraced study of literature, poetry, drama, philosophy, history, art, and languages. In the 20th and 21st centuries it is used to refer to a broad-based study of the liberal arts and sciences, as opposed to a practical or pre-professional program. Classical Education can be described as rigorous and systematic, separating children and their learning into three rigid categories, Grammar, Dialectic, and Rhetoric.

=== Essentialism ===
According to educational essentialism, there are certain essential facts about the world that every student needs to learn and master. It is a form of traditional education that relies on long-standing and established subjects and teaching methods. Essentialists usually focus on subjects like reading, writing, mathematics, and science, usually starting with very basic skills while progressively increasing complexity. They prefer a teacher-centered approach, meaning that the teacher acts as the authority figure guiding the learning activity while students are expected to follow their lead.

=== Social reconstructionism and critical pedagogy ===
Critical pedagogy is an "educational movement, guided by passion and principle, to help students develop consciousness of freedom, recognize authoritarian tendencies, and connect knowledge to power and the ability to take constructive action." Based in Marxist theory, critical pedagogy draws on radical democracy, anarchism, feminism, and other movements for social justice.

=== Democratic education ===
Democratic education is a theory of learning and school governance in which students and staff participate freely and equally in a school democracy. In a democratic school, there is typically shared decision-making among students and staff on matters concerning living, working, and learning together.

=== Progressivism ===
Educational progressivism is the belief that education must be based on the principle that humans are social animals who learn best in real-life activities with other people. Progressivists, like proponents of most educational theories, claim to rely on the best available scientific theories of learning. Most progressive educators believe that children learn as if they were scientists, following a process similar to John Dewey's model of learning known as "the pattern of inquiry": 1) Become aware of the problem. 2) Define the problem. 3) Propose hypotheses to solve it. 4) Evaluate the consequences of the hypotheses from one's past experience. 5) Test the likeliest solution.

=== Unschooling ===
Unschooling is a range of educational philosophies and practices centered on allowing children to learn through their natural life experiences, including child directed play, game play, household responsibilities, work experience, and social interaction, rather than through a more traditional school curriculum. Unschooling encourages exploration of activities led by the children themselves, facilitated by the adults. Unschooling differs from conventional schooling principally in the thesis that standard curricula and conventional grading methods, as well as other features of traditional schooling, are counterproductive to the goal of maximizing the education of each child.

=== Contemplative education ===
Contemplative education focuses on bringing introspective practices such as mindfulness and yoga into curricular and pedagogical processes for diverse aims grounded in secular, spiritual, religious and post-secular perspectives. Contemplative approaches may be used in the classroom, especially in tertiary or (often in modified form) in secondary education. Parker Palmer is a recent pioneer in contemplative methods. The Center for Contemplative Mind in Society founded a branch focusing on education, The Association for Contemplative Mind in Higher Education.

Contemplative methods may also be used by teachers in their preparation; Waldorf education was one of the pioneers of the latter approach. In this case, inspiration for enriching the content, format, or teaching methods may be sought through various practices, such as consciously reviewing the previous day's activities; actively holding the students in consciousness; and contemplating inspiring pedagogical texts. Zigler suggested that only through focusing on their own spiritual development could teachers positively impact the spiritual development of students.

== History ==
=== Ancient ===
==== Plato ====
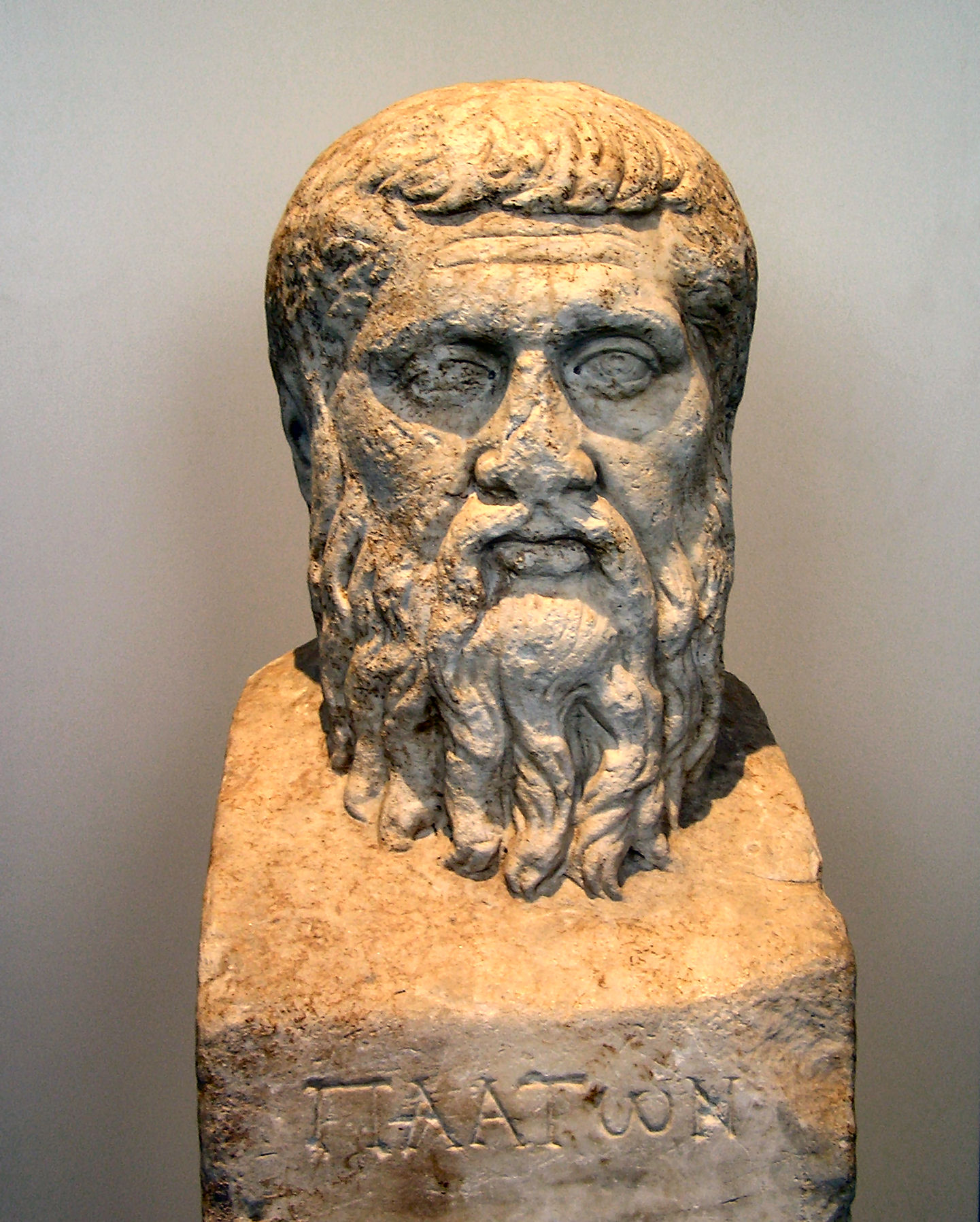
Inscribed herma of Plato (Berlin, Altes Museum)

Plato's educational philosophy was grounded in a vision of an ideal Republic wherein the individual was best served by being subordinated to a just society due to a shift in emphasis that departed from his predecessors. The mind and body were to be considered separate entities. In the dialogues of Phaedo, written in his "middle period" (360 BCE), Plato expressed his distinctive views about the nature of knowledge, reality, and the soul:

When the soul and body are united, then nature orders the soul to rule and govern, and the body to obey and serve. Now which of these two functions is akin to the divine? and which to the mortal? Does not the divine appear ... to be that which naturally orders and rules, and the mortal to be that which is subject and servant?

On this premise, Plato advocated removing children from their mothers' care and raising them as wards of the state, with great care being taken to differentiate children suitable to the various castes, the highest receiving the most education, so that they could act as guardians of the city and care for the less able. Education would be holistic, including facts, skills, physical discipline, and music and art, which he considered the highest form of endeavor.

Plato believed that talent was distributed non-genetically and thus must be found in children born in any social class. He built on this by insisting that those suitably gifted were to be trained by the state so that they might be qualified to assume the role of a ruling class. What this established was essentially a system of selective public education premised on the assumption that an educated minority of the population were, by virtue of their education (and inborn educability), sufficient for healthy governance.

Plato's writings contain some of the following ideas: Elementary education would be confined to the guardian class till the age of 18, followed by two years of compulsory military training and then by higher education for those who qualified. While elementary education made the soul responsive to the environment, higher education helped the soul to search for truth which illuminated it. Both boys and girls receive the same kind of education. Elementary education consisted of music and gymnastics, designed to train and blend gentle and fierce qualities in the individual and create a harmonious person.

At the age of 20, a selection was made. The best students would take an advanced course in mathematics, geometry, astronomy and harmonics. The first course in the scheme of higher education would last for ten years. It would be for those who had a flair for science. At the age of 30 there would be another selection; those who qualified would study dialectics and metaphysics, logic and philosophy for the next five years. After accepting junior positions in the army for 15 years, a man would have completed his theoretical and practical education by the age of 50.

==== Aristotle ====
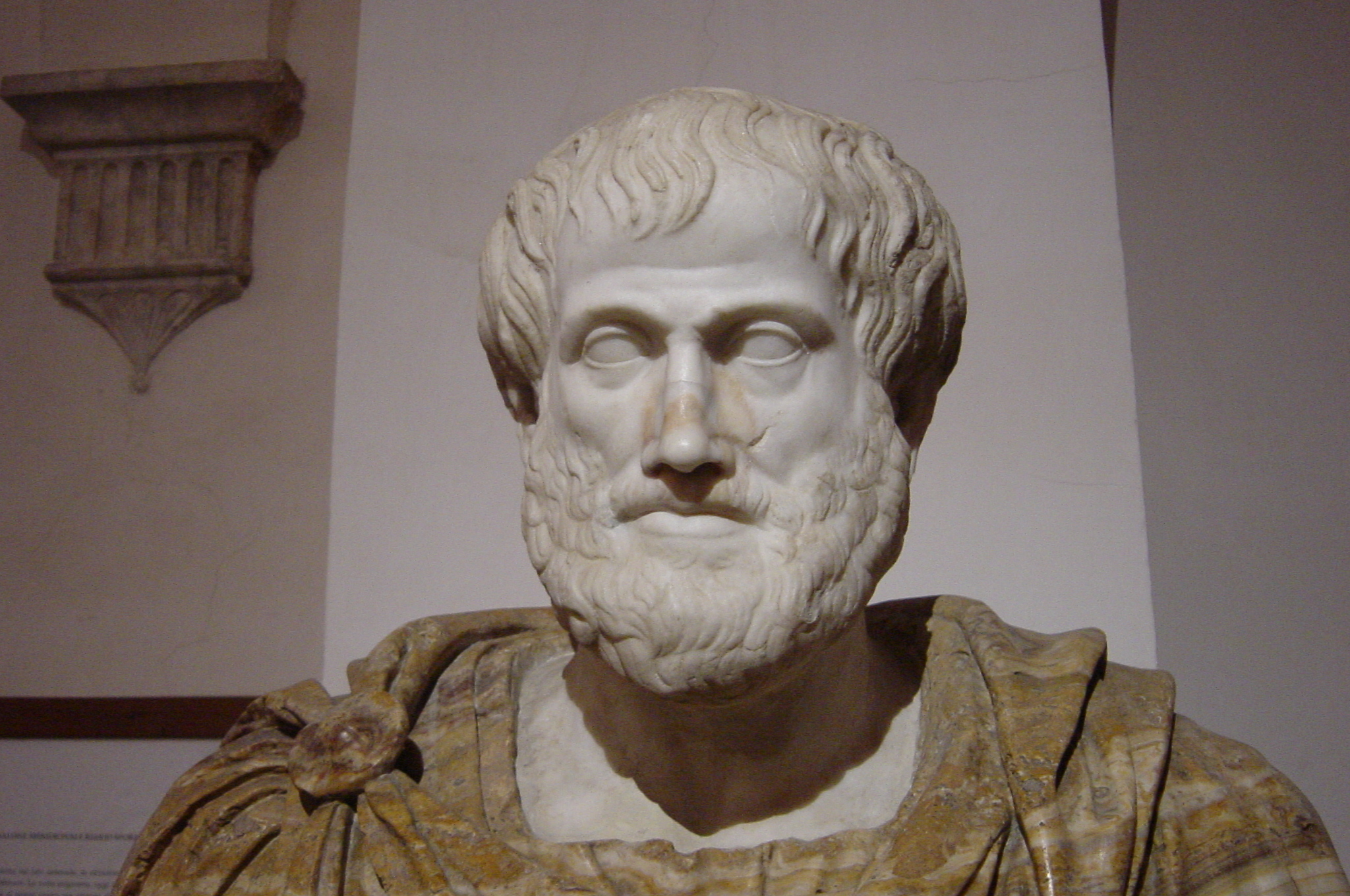
Bust of Aristotle. Roman copy after a Greek bronze original by Lysippos from 330 BC.

Only fragments of Aristotle's treatise On Education are still in existence. We thus know of his philosophy of education primarily through brief passages in other works. Aristotle considered human nature, habit and reason to be equally important forces to be cultivated in education. Thus, for example, he considered repetition to be a key tool to develop good habits. The teacher was to lead the student systematically; this differs, for example, from Socrates' emphasis on questioning his listeners to bring out their own ideas (though the comparison is perhaps incongruous since Socrates was dealing with adults).

Aristotle placed great emphasis on balancing the theoretical and practical aspects of subjects taught. Subjects he explicitly mentions as being important included reading, writing and mathematics; music; physical education; literature and history; and a wide range of sciences. He also mentioned the importance of play.

One of education's primary missions for Aristotle, perhaps its most important, was to produce good and virtuous citizens for the polis. All who have meditated on the art of governing mankind have been convinced that the fate of empires depends on the education of youth.

=== Medieval ===
==== Ibn Sina ====
In the medieval Islamic world, an elementary school was known as a maktab, which dates back to at least the 10th century. Like madrasahs (which referred to higher education), a maktab was often attached to a mosque. In the 11th century, Ibn Sina (known as Avicenna in the West), wrote a chapter dealing with the maktab entitled "The Role of the Teacher in the Training and Upbringing of Children", as a guide to teachers working at maktab schools. He wrote that children can learn better if taught in classes instead of individual tuition from private tutors, and he gave a number of reasons for why this is the case, citing the value of competition and emulation among pupils as well as the usefulness of group discussions and debates. Ibn Sina described the curriculum of a maktab school in some detail, describing the curricula for two stages of education in a maktab school.

Ibn Sina wrote that children should be sent to a maktab school from the age of 6 and be taught primary education until they reach the age of 14. During which time, he wrote that they should be taught the Qur'an, Islamic metaphysics, language, literature, Islamic ethics, and manual skills (which could refer to a variety of practical skills).

Ibn Sina refers to the secondary education stage of maktab schooling as the period of specialization, when pupils should begin to acquire manual skills, regardless of their social status. He writes that children after the age of 14 should be given a choice to choose and specialize in subjects they have an interest in, whether it was reading, manual skills, literature, preaching, medicine, geometry, trade and commerce, craftsmanship, or any other subject or profession they would be interested in pursuing for a future career. He wrote that this was a transitional stage and that there needs to be flexibility regarding the age in which pupils graduate, as the student's emotional development and chosen subjects need to be taken into account.

The empiricist theory of tabula rasa was also developed by Ibn Sina. He argued that the "human intellect at birth is rather like a tabula rasa, a pure potentiality that is actualized through education and comes to know" and that knowledge is attained through "empirical familiarity with objects in this world from which one abstracts universal concepts" which is developed through a "syllogistic method of reasoning; observations lead to prepositional statements, which when compounded lead to further abstract concepts." He further argued that the intellect itself "possesses levels of development from the material intellect (al-'aql al-hayulani), that potentiality that can acquire knowledge to the active intellect (al-'aql al-fa'il), the state of the human intellect in conjunction with the perfect source of knowledge".

==== Ibn Tufail ====
In the 12th century, the Andalusian-Arabian philosopher and novelist Ibn Tufail (known as "Abubacer" or "Ebn Tophail" in the West) demonstrated the empiricist theory of 'tabula rasa' as a thought experiment through his Arabic philosophical novel, Hayy ibn Yaqzan, in which he depicted the development of the mind of a feral child "from a tabula rasa to that of an adult, in complete isolation from society" on a desert island, through experience alone. Some scholars have argued that the Latin translation of his philosophical novel, Philosophus Autodidactus, published by Edward Pococke the Younger in 1671, had an influence on John Locke's formulation of tabula rasa in "An Essay Concerning Human Understanding".

=== Modern ===
==== Michel de Montaigne ====
Child education was among the psychological topics that Michel de Montaigne wrote about. His essays On the Education of Children, On Pedantry, and On Experience explain the views he had on child education. Some of his views on child education are still relevant today.

Montaigne's views on the education of children were opposed to the common educational practices of his day. He found fault both with what was taught and how it was taught. Much of the education during Montaigne's time was focused on the reading of the classics and learning through books.Montaigne disagreed with learning strictly through books. He believed it was necessary to educate children in a variety of ways. He also disagreed with the way information was being presented to students. It was being presented in a way that encouraged students to take the information that was taught to them as absolute truth. Students were denied the chance to question the information. Therefore, students could not truly learn. Montaigne believed that, to learn truly, a student had to take the information and make it their own.

At the foundation Montaigne believed that the selection of a good tutor was important for the student to become well educated. Education by a tutor was to be conducted at the pace of the student.He believed that a tutor should be in dialogue with the student, letting the student speak first. The tutor also should allow for discussions and debates to be had. Such a dialogue was intended to create an environment in which students would teach themselves. They would be able to realize their mistakes and make corrections to them as necessary.

Individualized learning was integral to his theory of child education. He argued that the student combines information already known with what is learned and forms a unique perspective on the newly learned information. Montaigne also thought that tutors should encourage the natural curiosity of students and allow them to question things.He postulated that successful students were those who were encouraged to question new information and study it for themselves, rather than simply accepting what they had heard from the authorities on any given topic. Montaigne believed that a child's curiosity could serve as an important teaching tool when the child is allowed to explore the things that the child is curious about.

Experience also was a key element to learning for Montaigne. Tutors needed to teach students through experience rather than through the mere memorization of information often practised in book learning.He argued that students would become passive adults, blindly obeying and lacking the ability to think on their own. Nothing of importance would be retained and no abilities would be learned. He believed that learning through experience was superior to learning through the use of books. For this reason he encouraged tutors to educate their students through practice, travel, and human interaction. In doing so, he argued that students would become active learners, who could claim knowledge for themselves.

Montaigne's views on child education continue to have an influence in the present. Variations of Montaigne's ideas on education are incorporated into modern learning in some ways. He argued against the popular way of teaching in his day, encouraging individualized learning. He believed in the importance of experience, over book learning and memorization. Ultimately, Montaigne postulated that the point of education was to teach a student how to have a successful life by practicing an active and socially interactive lifestyle.

==== John Locke ====
In Some Thoughts Concerning Education and Of the Conduct of the Understanding John Locke composed an outline on how to educate this mind in order to increase its powers and activity:

"The business of education is not, as I think, to make them perfect in any one of the sciences, but so to open and dispose their minds as may best make them capable of any, when they shall apply themselves to it."

"If men are for a long time accustomed only to one sort or method of thoughts, their minds grow stiff in it, and do not readily turn to another. It is therefore to give them this freedom, that I think they should be made to look into all sorts of knowledge, and exercise their understandings in so wide a variety and stock of knowledge. But I do not propose it as a variety and stock of knowledge, but a variety and freedom of thinking, as an increase of the powers and activity of the mind, not as an enlargement of its possessions."

Locke expressed the belief that education maketh the man, or, more fundamentally, that the mind is an "empty cabinet", with the statement, "I think I may say that of all the men we meet with, nine parts of ten are what they are, good or evil, useful or not, by their education."

Locke also wrote that "the little and almost insensible impressions on our tender infancies have very important and lasting consequences." He argued that the "associations of ideas" that one makes when young are more important than those made later because they are the foundation of the self: they are, put differently, what first mark the tabula rasa. In his Essay, in which is introduced both of these concepts, Locke warns against, for example, letting "a foolish maid" convince a child that "goblins and sprites" are associated with the night for "darkness shall ever afterwards bring with it those frightful ideas, and they shall be so joined, that he can no more bear the one than the other."

"Associationism", as this theory would come to be called, exerted a powerful influence over eighteenth-century thought, particularly educational theory, as nearly every educational writer warned parents not to allow their children to develop negative associations. It also led to the development of psychology and other new disciplines with David Hartley's attempt to discover a biological mechanism for associationism in his Observations on Man (1749).

==== Jean-Jacques Rousseau ====
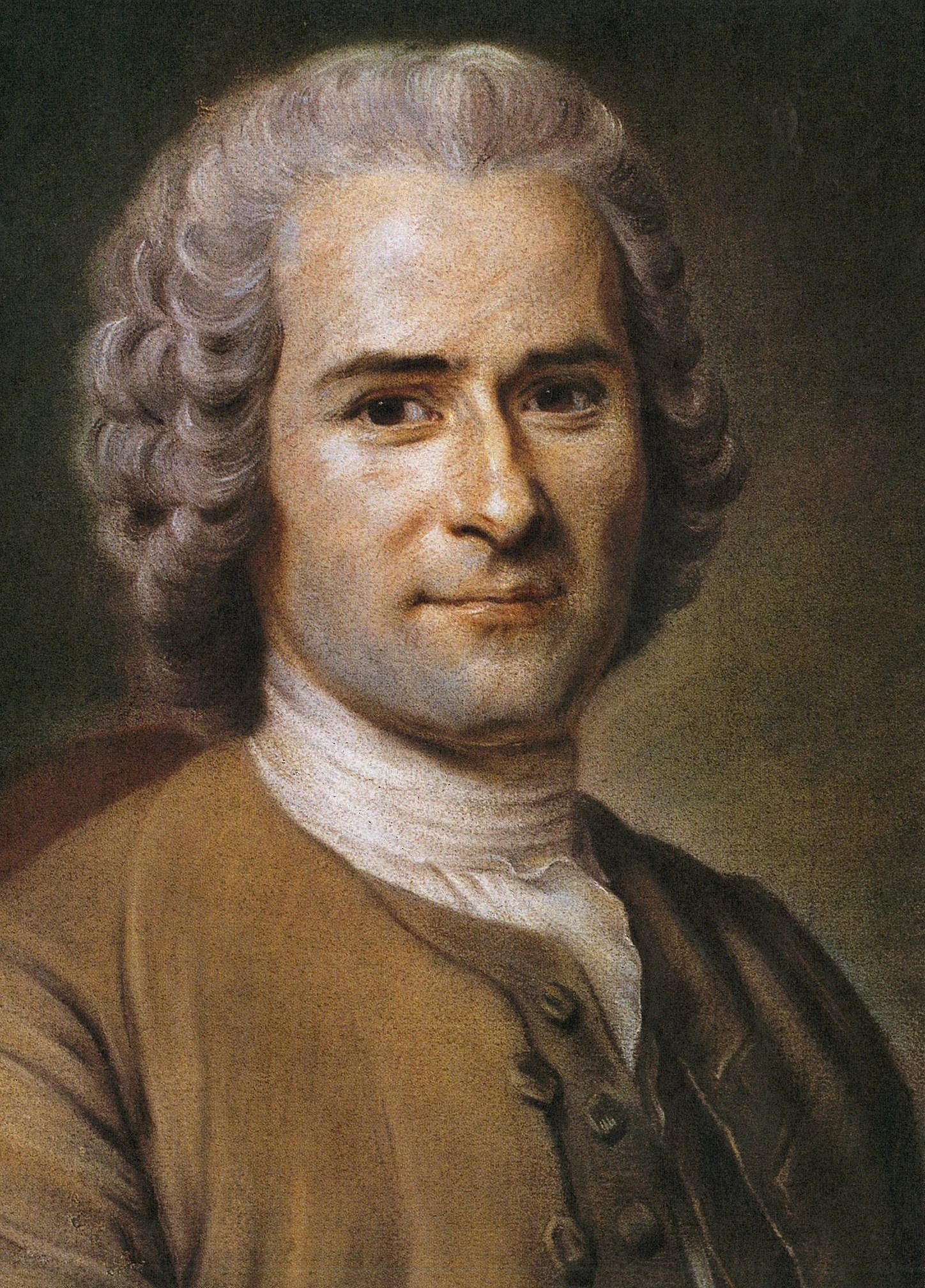
Jean-Jacques Rousseau by Maurice Quentin de La Tour

Jean-Jacques Rousseau, though he paid his respects to Plato's philosophy, rejected it as impractical due to the decayed state of society. Rousseau also had a different theory of human development; where Plato held that people are born with skills appropriate to different castes (though he did not regard these skills as being inherited), Rousseau held that there was one developmental process common to all humans. This was an intrinsic, natural process, of which the primary behavioral manifestation was curiosity. This differed from Locke's 'tabula rasa' in that it was an active process deriving from the child's nature, which drove the child to learn and adapt to its surroundings.

Rousseau wrote in his book Emile that all children are perfectly designed organisms, ready to learn from their surroundings so as to grow into virtuous adults, but due to the malign influence of corrupt society, they often fail to do so. Rousseau advocated an educational method which consisted of removing the child from society—for example, to a country home—and alternately conditioning him through changes to his environment and setting traps and puzzles for him to solve or overcome.

Rousseau was unusual in that he recognized and addressed the potential of a problem of legitimation for teaching. He advocated that adults always be truthful with children, and in particular that they never hide the fact that the basis for their authority in teaching was purely one of physical coercion: "I'm bigger than you." Once children reached the age of reason, at about 12, they would be engaged as free individuals in the ongoing process of their own.

He once said that a child should grow up without adult interference and that the child must be guided to suffer from the experience of the natural consequences of his own acts or behaviour. When he experiences the consequences of his own acts, he advises himself.

"Rousseau divides development into five stages (a book is devoted to each). Education in the first two stages seeks to the senses: only when Émile is about 12 does the tutor begin to work to develop his mind. Later, in Book 5, Rousseau examines the education of Sophie (whom Émile is to marry). Here he sets out what he sees as the essential differences that flow from sex. 'The man should be strong and active; the woman should be weak and passive' (Everyman edn: 322). From this difference comes a contrasting education. They are not to be brought up in ignorance and kept to housework: Nature means them to think, to will, to love to cultivate their minds as well as their persons; she puts these weapons in their hands to make up for their lack of strength and to enable them to direct the strength of men. They should learn many things, but only such things as suitable' (Everyman edn.: 327)." Émile

==== Immanuel Kant ====
Immanuel Kant believed that education differs from training in that the former involves thinking whereas the latter does not. In addition to educating reason, of central importance to him was the development of character and teaching of moral maxims. Kant was a proponent of public education and of learning by doing.

==== Charlotte Mason ====
Charlotte Mason was a British educator who invested her life in improving the quality of children's education. Her ideas led to a method used by some homeschoolers. Mason's philosophy of education is probably best summarized by the principles given at the beginning of each of her books. Two key mottos taken from those principles are "Education is an atmosphere, a discipline, a life" and "Education is the science of relations." She believed that children were born persons and should be respected as such; they should also be taught the Way of the Will and the Way of Reason. Her motto for students was "I am, I can, I ought, I will." Charlotte Mason believed that children should be introduced to subjects through living books, not through the use of "compendiums, abstracts, or selections." She used abridged books only when the content was deemed inappropriate for children. She preferred that parents or teachers read aloud those texts (such as Plutarch and the Old Testament), making omissions only where necessary.

=== 20th and 21st century ===
==== Rudolf Steiner (Waldorf education) ====
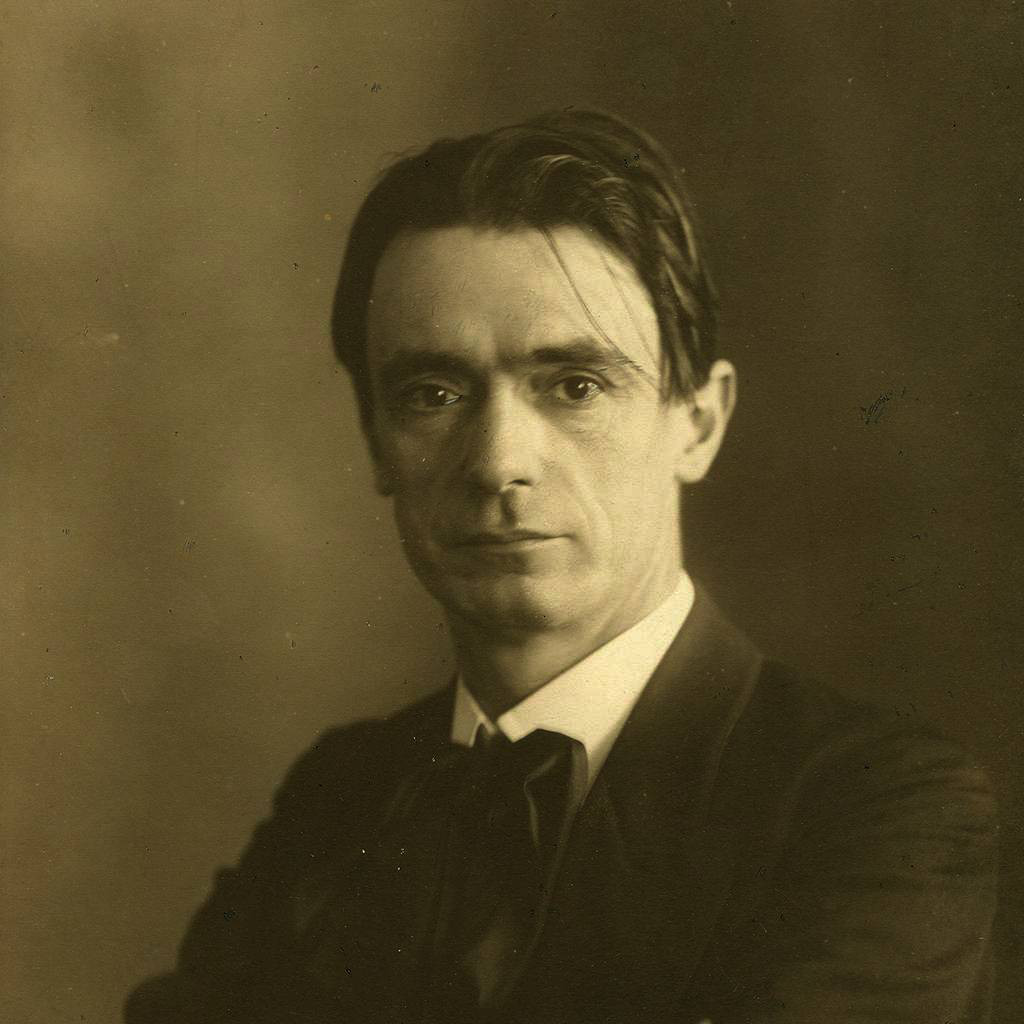
Rudolf Steiner

Waldorf education (also known as Steiner or Steiner-Waldorf education) is a humanistic approach to pedagogy based upon the educational philosophy of the Austrian philosopher Rudolf Steiner, the founder of anthroposophy. Now known as Waldorf or Steiner education, his pedagogy emphasizes a balanced development of cognitive, affective/artistic, and practical skills (head, heart, and hands). Schools are normally self-administered by faculty; emphasis is placed upon giving individual teachers the freedom to develop creative methods.

Steiner's theory of child development divides education into three discrete developmental stages predating but with close similarities to the stages of development described by Piaget. Early childhood education occurs through imitation; teachers provide practical activities and a healthy environment. Steiner believed that young children should meet only goodness. Elementary education is strongly arts-based, centered on the teacher's creative authority; the elementary school-age child should meet beauty. Secondary education seeks to develop the judgment, intellect, and practical idealism; the adolescent should meet truth.

Learning is interdisciplinary, integrating practical, artistic, and conceptual elements. The approach emphasizes the role of the imagination in learning, developing thinking that includes a creative as well as an analytic component. The educational philosophy's overarching goals are to provide young people the basis on which to develop into free, morally responsible and integrated individuals, and to help every child fulfill his or her unique destiny, the existence of which anthroposophy posits. Schools and teachers are given considerable freedom to define curricula within collegial structures.

==== John Dewey ====
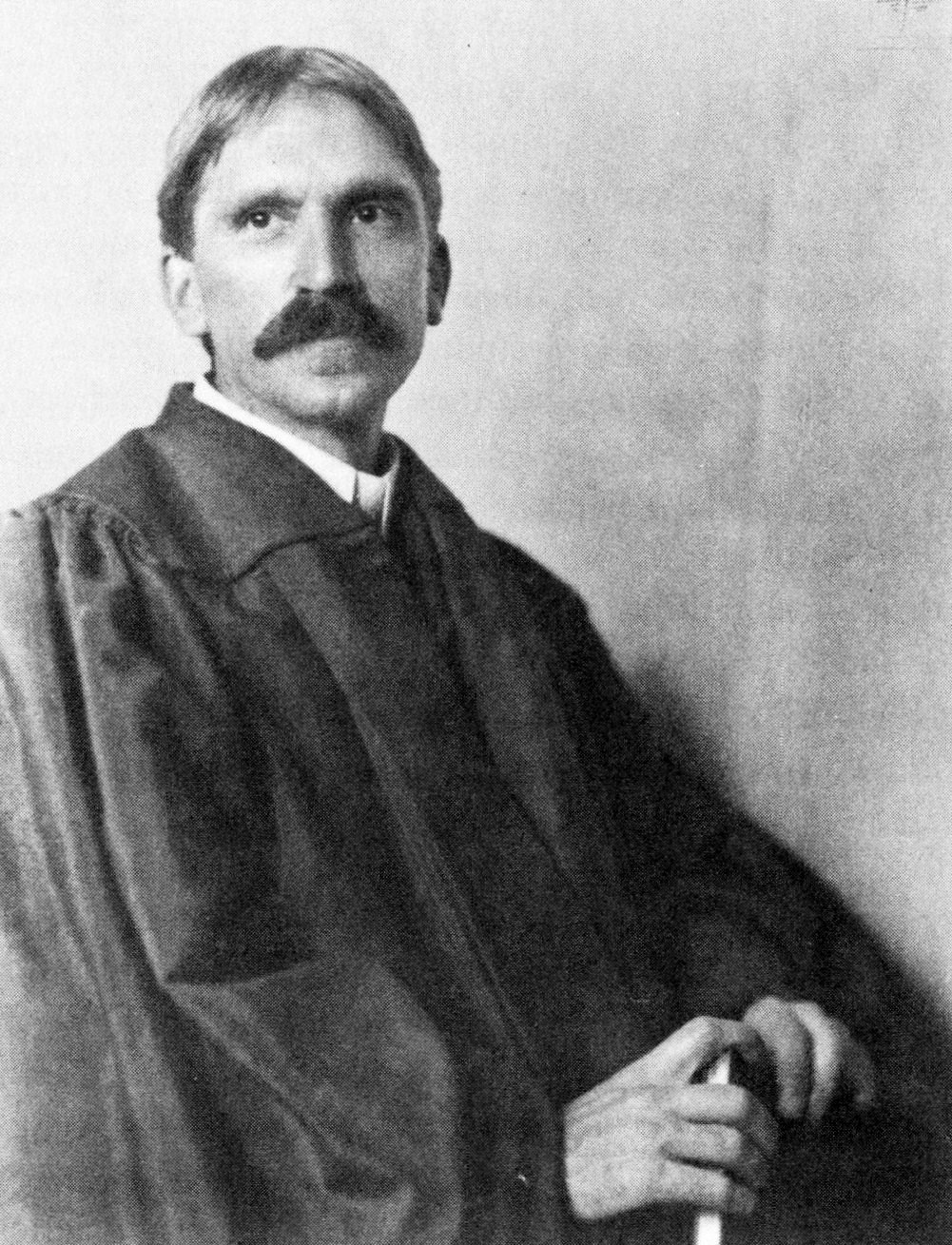
John Dewey in 1902

In Democracy and Education: An Introduction to the Philosophy of Education, John Dewey stated that education, in its broadest sense, is the means of the "social continuity of life" given the "primary ineluctable facts of the birth and death of each one of the constituent members in a social group". Education is therefore a necessity, for "the life of the group goes on." Dewey was a proponent of Educational Progressivism and was a relentless campaigner for reform of education, pointing out that the authoritarian, strict, pre-ordained knowledge approach of modern traditional education was too concerned with delivering knowledge, and not enough with understanding students' actual experiences.

In 1896, Dewey opened the Laboratory School at the University of Chicago in an institutional effort to pursue together rather than apart "utility and culture, absorption and expression, theory and practice, [which] are [indispensable] elements in any educational scheme. As the unified head of the departments of Philosophy, Psychology and Pedagogy, John Dewey articulated a desire to organize an educational experience where children could be more creative than the best of progressive models of his day. Transactionalism as a pragmatic philosophy grew out of the work he did in the Laboratory School. The two most influential works that stemmed from his research and study were The Child and the Curriculum (1902) and Democracy and Education (1916). Dewey wrote of the dualisms that plagued educational philosophy in the latter book: "Instead of seeing the educative process steadily and as a whole, we see conflicting terms. We get the case of the child vs. the curriculum; of the individual nature vs. social culture." Dewey found that the preoccupation with facts as knowledge in the educative process led students to memorize "ill-understood rules and principles" and while second-hand knowledge learned in mere words is a beginning in study, mere words can never replace the ability to organize knowledge into both useful and valuable experience.

==== Maria Montessori ====
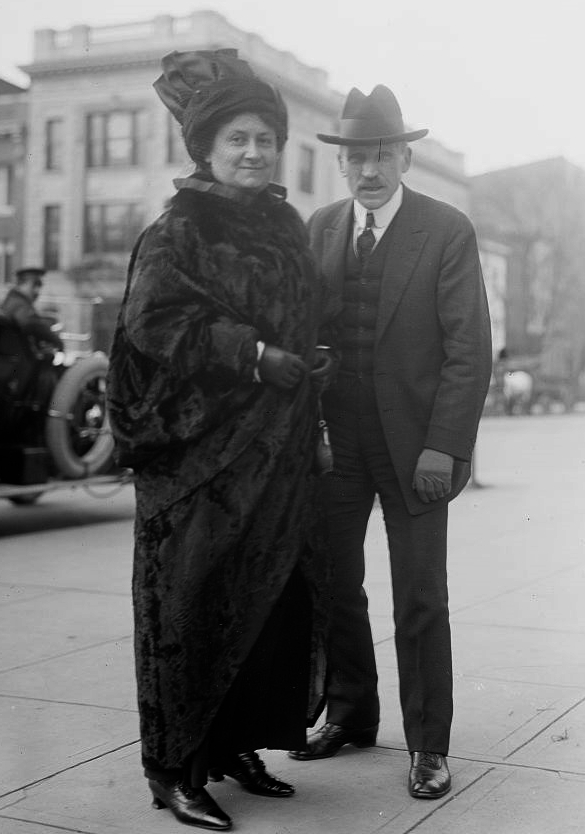
Maria Montessori and Samuel Sidney McClure

The Montessori method arose from Dr. Maria Montessori's discovery of what she referred to as "the child's true normal nature" in 1907, which happened in the process of her experimental observation of young children given freedom in an environment prepared with materials designed for their self-directed learning activity. The method itself aims to duplicate this experimental observation of children to bring about, sustain and support their true natural way of being.

==== William Heard Kilpatrick ====
William Heard Kilpatrick was a US American philosopher of education and a colleague and a successor of John Dewey. He was a major figure in the progressive education movement of the early 20th century. Kilpatrick developed the Project Method for early childhood education, which was a form of Progressive Education organized curriculum and classroom activities around a subject's central theme. He believed that the role of a teacher should be that of a "guide" as opposed to an authoritarian figure. Kilpatrick believed that children should direct their own learning according to their interests and should be allowed to explore their environment, experiencing their learning through the natural senses. Proponents of Progressive Education and the Project Method reject traditional schooling that focuses on memorization, rote learning, strictly organized classrooms (desks in rows; students always seated), and typical forms of assessment.

==== William Chandler Bagley ====
William Chandler Bagley taught in elementary schools before becoming a professor of education at the University of Illinois, where he served as the Director of the School of Education from 1908 until 1917. He was a professor of education at Teachers College, Columbia, from 1917 to 1940. An opponent of pragmatism and progressive education, Bagley insisted on the value of knowledge for its own sake, not merely as an instrument, and he criticized his colleagues for their failure to emphasize systematic study of academic subjects. Bagley was a proponent of educational essentialism.

==== A. S. Neill ====
A. S. Neill founded Summerhill School, the oldest existing democratic school in Suffolk, England, in 1921. He wrote a number of books that now define much of contemporary democratic education philosophy. Neill believed that the happiness of the child should be the paramount consideration in decisions about the child's upbringing, and that this happiness grew from a sense of personal freedom. He felt that deprivation of this sense of freedom during childhood, and the consequent unhappiness experienced by the repressed child, was responsible for many of the psychological disorders of adulthood.

==== Martin Heidegger ====
Martin Heidegger's philosophizing about education was primarily related to higher education. He believed that teaching and research in the university should be unified and that students should be taught "to focus on and explicitly investigate the ontological presuppositions which implicitly guide research in each domain of knowledge," an approach he believed would "encourage revolutionary transformation in the sciences and humanities."

==== Jean Piaget ====
Jean Piaget was a Swiss developmental psychologist known for his epistemological studies with children. His theory of cognitive development and epistemological view are together called "genetic epistemology". Piaget placed great importance on the education of children. As the Director of the International Bureau of Education, he declared in 1934 that "only education is capable of saving our societies from possible collapse, whether violent, or gradual." Piaget created the International Centre for Genetic Epistemology in Geneva in 1955 and directed it until 1980. According to Ernst von Glasersfeld, Jean Piaget is "the great pioneer of the constructivist theory of knowing."

Jean Piaget described himself as an epistemologist, interested in the process of the qualitative development of knowledge. As he says in the introduction of his book Genetic Epistemology (ISBN 978-0-393-00596-7): "What the genetic epistemology proposes is discovering the roots of the different varieties of knowledge, since its elementary forms, following to the next levels, including also the scientific knowledge."

==== Mortimer Jerome Adler ====
Mortimer Jerome Adler was an American philosopher, educator, and popular author. As a philosopher he worked within the Aristotelian and Thomistic traditions. He lived for the longest stretches in New York City, Chicago, San Francisco, and San Mateo, California. He worked for Columbia University, the University of Chicago, Encyclopædia Britannica, and Adler's own Institute for Philosophical Research. Adler was married twice and had four children. Adler was a proponent of educational perennialism.

==== Harry S. Broudy ====
Harry S. Broudy's philosophical views were based on the tradition of classical realism, dealing with truth, goodness, and beauty. However he was also influenced by the modern philosophy existentialism and instrumentalism. In his textbook Building a Philosophy of Education he has two major ideas that are the main points to his philosophical outlook: The first is truth and the second is universal structures to be found in humanity's struggle for education and the good life. Broudy also studied issues on society's demands on school. He thought education would be a link to unify the diverse society and urged the society to put more trust and a commitment to the schools and a good education.

==== Jerome Bruner ====
Another important contributor to the inquiry method in education is Jerome Bruner. His books The Process of Education and Toward a Theory of Instruction are landmarks in conceptualizing learning and curriculum development. He argued that any subject can be taught in some intellectually honest form to any child at any stage of development. This notion was an underpinning for his concept of the "spiral" (helical) curriculum which posited the idea that a curriculum should revisit basic ideas, building on them until the student had grasped the full formal concept. He emphasized intuition as a neglected but essential feature of productive thinking. He felt that interest in the material being learned was the best stimulus for learning rather than external motivation such as grades. Bruner developed the concept of discovery learning which promoted learning as a process of constructing new ideas based on current or past knowledge. Students are encouraged to discover facts and relationships and continually build on what they already know.

==== Paulo Freire ====
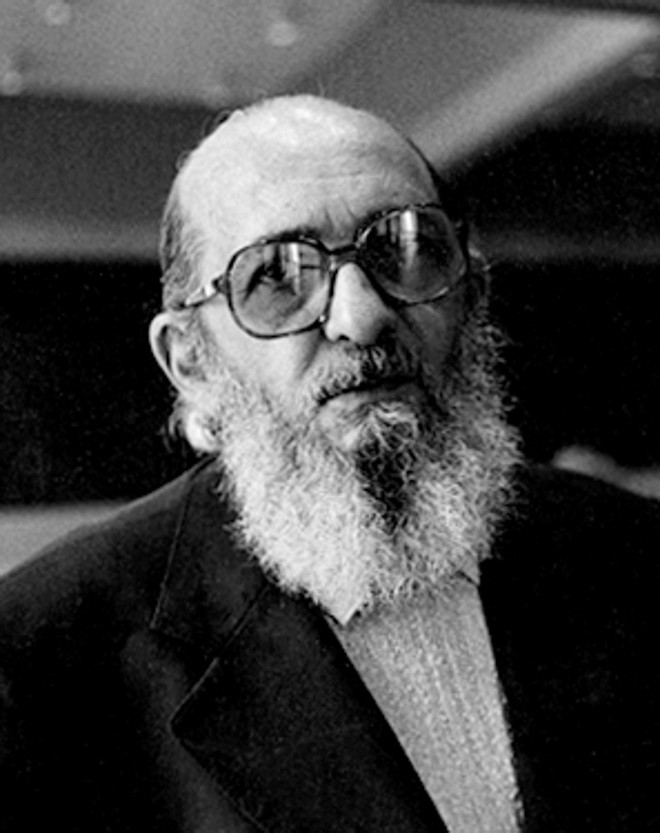
Paulo Freire

A Brazilian philosopher and educator committed to the cause of educating the impoverished peasants of his nation and collaborating with them in the pursuit of their liberation from what he regarded as "oppression", Paulo Freire is best known for his attack on what he called the "banking concept of education", in which the student was viewed as an empty account to be filled by the teacher. Freire also suggests that a deep reciprocity be inserted into our notions of teacher and student; he comes close to suggesting that the teacher-student dichotomy be completely abolished, instead promoting the roles of the participants in the classroom as the teacher-student (a teacher who learns) and the student-teacher (a learner who teaches). In its early, strong form this kind of classroom has sometimes been criticized on the grounds that it can mask rather than overcome the teacher's authority.

Aspects of the Freirian philosophy have been highly influential in academic debates over "participatory development" and development more generally. Freire's emphasis on what he describes as "emancipation" through interactive participation has been used as a rationale for the participatory focus of development, as it is held that 'participation' in any form can lead to empowerment of poor or marginalised groups. Freire was a proponent of critical pedagogy. "He participated in the import of European doctrines and ideas into Brazil, assimilated them to the needs of a specific socio-economic situation, and thus expanded and refocused them in a thought-provoking way"

==== John Holt ====
In 1964 John Holt published his first book, How Children Fail, asserting that the academic failure of schoolchildren was not despite the efforts of the schools, but actually because of the schools. How Children Fail ignited a firestorm of controversy. Holt was catapulted into the American national consciousness to the extent that he made appearances on major TV talk shows, wrote book reviews for Life magazine, and was a guest on the To Tell The Truth TV game show. In his follow-up work, How Children Learn, published in 1967, Holt tried to elucidate the learning process of children and why he believed school short circuits that process.

==== Nel Noddings ====
Nel Noddings' first sole-authored book Caring: A Feminine Approach to Ethics and Moral Education (1984) followed close on the 1982 publication of Carol Gilligan's ground-breaking work in the ethics of care In a Different Voice. While her work on ethics continued, with the publication of Women and Evil (1989) and later works on moral education, most of her later publications have been on the philosophy of education and educational theory. Her most significant works in these areas have been Educating for Intelligent Belief or Unbelief (1993) and Philosophy of Education (1995).

Noddings' contribution to education philosophy centers around the ethic of care. Her belief was that a caring teacher-student relationship will result in the teacher designing a differentiated curriculum for each student, and that this curriculum would be based around the students' particular interests and needs. The teacher's claim to care must not be based on a one time virtuous decision but an ongoing interest in the students' welfare.

== See also ==
- Education sciences
- Methodology
- Holistic education
- Learning theory (education)
- Outline of educational aims
- Pedagogy
- Philosophy education
