= Outline of educational aims =

The following outline is provided as an overview of and topical guide to education aims:

Educational aim is a goal of the educational experience or process. This page lists the generic educational aims which one might encounter in educational theory, research or practice, including new concepts in published literature. The discussion and study of educational aims are usually found in philosophy of education, educational theories, and through practical policy making.

- Knowledge
  - Descriptive knowledge
  - Procedural knowledge
- Wisdom
- Skills
  - Higher order thinking skills
  - Numeracy
  - Reasoning
  - 21st century skills
    - Creativity
    - Metacognition
    - Life skills
    - Study skills
    - Critical thinking
- Literacy
  - Cultural literacy
    - Diaspora literacy
    - Faith literacy
  - Digital literacy
    - Computer literacy
    - Transliteracy
    - Technological literacy
    - Web literacy
  - Information and media literacy
    - Data literacy
    - Information literacy
    - Media literacy
    - Scientific literacy
    - Statistical literacy
    - Visual literacy
    - Information literacies
  - Agricultural literacy
  - Carbon literacy
  - Ecological literacy
  - Emotional literacy
  - Geo-literacy
  - Health literacy
    - Mental health literacy
  - Legal literacy
  - Oracy
  - Power literacy
    - Critical literacy
    - Racial literacy
  - Financial literacy
  - Musical literacy
- Disposition
- Attitudes
- Discipline
- Social-emotional skills
  - Interpersonal relationship
  - Self-awareness
  - Social consciousness
  - Emotional self-regulation
  - Self-directed beliefs
    - Academic self-concept
    - Academic self-efficacy
    - Self-esteem
- Motivation
- Bildung
- Educational equity
- Educational inequality
- Peace
  - Reconciliation
- Economic growth
- Sustainable development
- Justice

== See also ==
- Outline of education
