= List of education by subject =

This page lists types of education by subject.

== Arts and humanities ==
- Classics education
- Fine arts
  - Art education
  - Dance education
  - Music education
  - Performing arts education
- Language education
  - Literacy education
  - Second-language education
- Philosophy education
- Religious education

== Business and commerce ==
- Business education
- Management education
- Economics education

== Science, technology, engineering and mathematics (STEM) ==
- Chemistry education
- Computer science education
- Engineering education
- Environmental education
- Mathematics education
- Physics education
- Science education
- Science studies

== Social sciences ==
- Civics education
- Cultural studies
- Human rights education
- International studies
- Journalism education
- Peace education
- Relationship education
- Sex education

== Health-oriented education ==
- Health education
- Medical education
- Nurse education
- Physical education

== Occupational and practically oriented educations ==
- Agricultural education
- Career and technical education
- Legal education
- Maritime education
- Military education and training
- Teacher education
- Veterinary education
- Vocational education

== See also ==
- Outline of education
- Computational education subjects
