= Cultural literacy =

Ability to understand a culture

Cultural literacy is a term coined by American educator and literary critic E. D. Hirsch, referring to the ability to understand and participate fluently in a given culture. Cultural literacy is an analogy to literacy proper (the ability to read and write letters). A literate reader knows the object-language's alphabet, grammar, and a sufficient set of vocabulary; a culturally literate person knows a given culture's signs and symbols, including its language, particular dialectic, stories, entertainment, idioms, idiosyncrasies, and so on. The culturally literate person is able to talk to and understand others of that culture with fluency.

== Causes ==
Children of a given culture typically become culturally literate there via the process of enculturation. Enculturation seems to occur naturally, being intertwined with education, play, family relationships, friendships, etc. The cause of cultural literacy is a more difficult question when considering acculturation of immigrants, outsiders, cultural minorities, strangers, guests, etc.

Literacy of a given culture seems to arise over time with consistent exposure to and participation in that culture, especially certain key cultural strongholds, like business, story, arts, education, history, religion, and family. One could become literate in an oral culture (with no written language or recorded media) only by extended conversation. Alternatively, one could become literate for a written culture through conversation as well as reading culturally relevant books or exposure to culturally relevant films, plays, monuments, television shows, etc.

Western culture in general and Anglo-American culture in particular is a bibliocentric culture. It often trades in allusions to the Christian Bible, the influential works of Early Modern English such as works of William Shakespeare, the Thomas Cranmer Book of Common Prayer, Geoffrey Chaucer's poetry, and many others. Knowledge of these books (among others) contributes largely to cultural literacy in the west. However, also essential are exposure to the art, history, and the lived experience of members of that culture.

== Examples ==
For example, in 1908 British author G. K. Chesterton wrote, "Complete self-confidence is a weakness... the man who has [self-confidence] has 'Hanwell' written on his face as plain as it is written on that omnibus". This statement, especially the latter half, might be opaque to a reader from outside the United Kingdom, who does not know that "omnibus" is a less common British word for "bus" and "Hanwell" was the name of a (now defunct) insane asylum.

== Consequences ==
The benefits and detriments of cultural literacy are debated. For example, social mobility increases when one is able to comfortably participate in conversation with gatekeepers like employers and teachers. Non-native members of a culture, such as missionaries to a foreign land or refugees from a native land, may experience negative consequences due to cultural illiteracy. However, the achievement of cultural literacy may seem to come at a cost to one's own native culture.

== Research and questions ==
Discussions of cultural literacy have given rise to several controversial questions:

- The Literature Question: How important are books to cultural literacy in the west? And which books?
- The Content Question: What kinds of knowledge are important for cultural literacy? Knowing such and such facts, names, dates or more ethereal experiences like having heard such and such a song?
- The Minority Question: Is cultural literacy part of the hegemony of the dominant culture?
- The Multicultural Question: Which culture are we talking about when we say "cultural" literacy? Should we be talking about one or several—and which one(s)?
- The Education Question: Should advancing cultural literacy be one of the goals of education? If so, what is the best means of doing so?
- The Assessment Question: How do we evaluate cultural literacy? Is there a best way to test someone's cultural literacy?

== See also ==
- Bildung
- Cultural competence
- Cultural sensitivity
- Educational essentialism
- Great books
- Intercultural communication
- Scientific literacy
