= School and Society =

School and Society was a weekly educational periodical established in 1915 by psychologist James McKeen Cattell, originally published by Science Press. It was described as a "weekly journal covering the field of education in relation to the problems of American democracy".

Cattell was the editor of the journal from 1915 until 1939, when William Bagley took over the role. In 1922, the Society for the Advancement of Education took over the duties of publication. During its lifetime, the journal absorbed many defunct journals, including the School Journal, the Teacher's Magazine, and the Educational Review.

In 1972, the journal changed its name to Intellect: Magazine of Educational and Social Affairs for the first several volumes, and then again to Intellect: The National Review of Professional Thought. It continued to publish until 1977.
