= Educational Review =

The Educational Review was a periodical established in 1891 by Nicholas Murray Butler to promote the scientific study of education. It was published by Henry Holt and edited by Butler from 1891 to 1919, followed by Frank Pierrepont Graves until 1924, and William McAndrew. Assistant editors included William Maxwell, Earl H. Cook, and Addison B. Poland.

By 1900, the Educational Review had garnered a reputation as one of the best educational periodicals in the world. The journal was found in almost every major library by 1919. The last issue of the journal was published in 1928, after which it was taken over by psychologist James McKeen Cattell and folded into the periodical School and Society.
