= William Henry Maxwell (educator) =

British sanitary engineer and educator

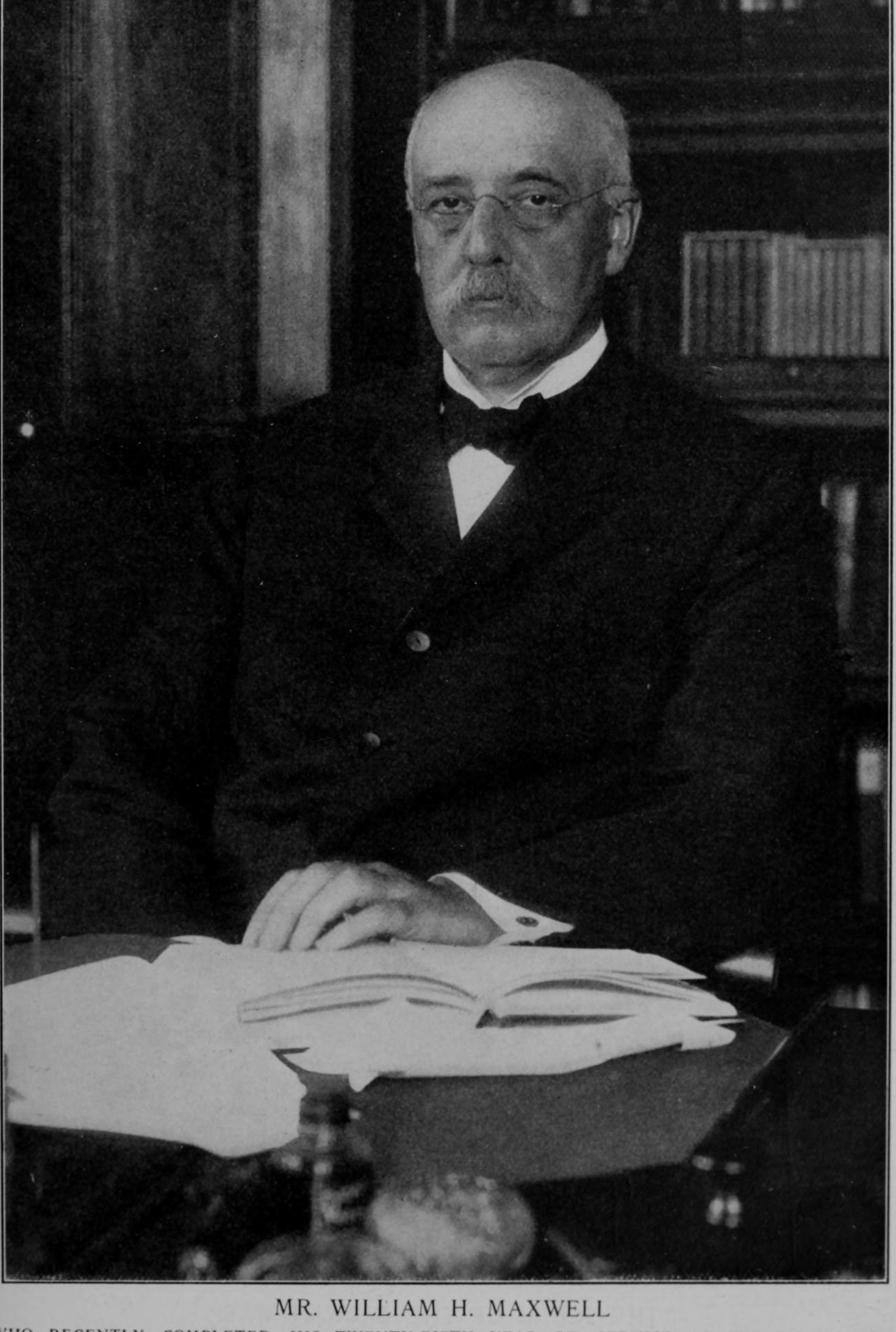
Portrait c. 1912

William Henry Maxwell (March 5, 1852 – May 3, 1920) was an American educator. From 1898 to 1917, he was superintendent of public schools in New York City.

== Biography ==
Maxwell born near the village of Stewartstown, County Tyrone, Ireland, on March 5, 1852. He comes from “an old Scotch family which settled in Ulster during the reign of Queen Elizabeth, his father, John Maxwell, being a Presbyterian clergyman.”

He was educated at the College of Belfast and Galway and at Queen's University, took his A.B. in 1872, and his A. M. in 1874. In 1874 he emigrated to the United States; and from 1882 to 1898 he superintended the Brooklyn public schools. As superintendent of the New York City Public Schools Maxwell worked to keep the march of educational facilities apace with the growth of New York City. In 1901 he was made an honorary LL.D. by Columbia University. In 1904/05 he was president of the National Education Association.

== Publications ==
He was the author and editor of several textbooks for schools, and many of his short papers and addresses are printed in the proceedings of the N. E. A. and in educational magazines.

== See also ==
- Educational Review
- History of education in New York City
