= Slow education =

Educational philosophy

Slow education is based upon Socratic, adaptive and non-standards based approaches to teaching. Slow education is in part a reaction to the overly compacted course content requirements teachers are experiencing from nationalized curricula worldwide, which many educators find students cannot cover in a single year with sufficient depth. Slow education is also a reaction to the proliferation of standardized testing, favoring instead qualitative measures of student and teacher success. Slow education is frequently a feature in free, democratic and home schools. However, it can be a significant element in any classroom, including those in college preparatory and rigorous environments. The term "slow education" was derived from the distinction between slow food and fast food or junk food, and is an effort to associate quality, culture, sustainability, and personalization with quality schooling.

== See also ==
- Waldorf education
