= Educational perennialism =

Educational philosophy

Educational perennialism is a normative educational philosophy. Perennialists believe that the priority of education should be to teach principles that have persisted for centuries, not facts. Since people are human, one should teach first about humans, rather than machines or techniques, and about liberal, rather than vocational, topics.

Perennialism appears similar to essentialism but primarily emphasizes personal development, while essentialism focuses first on essential skills. Essentialist curricula tend to be more vocational and fact-based, and far less liberal and principle-based. Both philosophies are typically considered to be teacher-centered, as opposed to student-centered philosophies of education such as progressivism. Teachers associated with perennialism are authors of the Western masterpieces and are open to student criticism through the associated Socratic method.

== Secular perennialism ==
The word "perennial" in secular perennialism suggests something that lasts an indefinite amount of time, recurs again and again, or is self-renewing. Robert Hutchins and Mortimer Adler promoted a universal curriculum based on the common and essential nature of all human beings and encompassing humanist and scientific traditions. Hutchins and Adler implemented these ideas with great success at the University of Chicago, where they still strongly influence the Undergraduate Common Core. Other notable figures in the movement include Stringfellow Barr and Scott Buchanan (who together initiated the Great Books program at St. John's College in Annapolis, Maryland), Mark Van Doren, Alexander Meiklejohn, and Sir Richard Livingstone, an English classicist with an American following. Inspired by Adler's lectures, Sister Miriam Joseph wrote a textbook on the scholastic trivium and taught it as the Freshman seminar at Saint Mary's College.

Secular perennialists espouse the idea that education should focus on the historical development of a continually advancing common orienting base of human knowledge and art, the timeless value of classic thought on central human issues by landmark thinkers, and revolutionary ideas critical to historical paradigm shifts or changes in worldview. A program of studies which is highly general, nonspecialized, and nonvocational is advocated. They firmly believe that exposure of all people to the development of thought by those most responsible for the evolution of the occidental oriented tradition is integral to the survival of the freedoms, human rights, and responsibilities inherent to a true democracy.

Adler states:

... our political democracy depends upon the reconstitution of our schools. Our schools are not turning out young people prepared for the high office and the duties of citizenship in a democratic republic. Our political institutions cannot thrive, they may not even survive, if we do not produce a greater number of thinking citizens, from whom some statesmen of the type we had in the 18th century might eventually emerge. We are, indeed, a nation at risk, and nothing but radical reform of our schools can save us from impending disaster... Whatever the price... the price we will pay for not doing it will be much greater.

Hutchins writes in the same vein:

The business of saying ... that people are not capable of achieving a good education is too strongly reminiscent of the opposition of every extension of democracy. This opposition has always rested on the allegation that the people were incapable of exercising the power they demanded. Always the historic statement has been verified: you cannot expect the slave to show the virtues of the free man unless you first set him free. When the slave has been set free, he has, in the passage of time, become indistinguishable from those who have always been free ... There appears to be an innate human tendency to underestimate the capacity of those who do not belong to "our" group. Those who do not share our background cannot have our ability. Foreigners, people who are in a different economic status, and the young seem invariably to be regarded as intellectually backward ...

As with the essentialists, perennialists are educationally conservative in the requirement of a curriculum focused upon fundamental subject areas, but they stress that the overall aim should be exposure to history's finest thinkers as models for discovery. The student should be taught such basic subjects as English, languages, history, mathematics, natural science, philosophy, and fine arts. Adler states: "The three R's, which always signified the formal disciplines, are the essence of liberal or general education."

Secular perennialists agree with progressivists that memorization of vast amounts of factual information and a focus on second-hand information in textbooks and lectures does not develop rational thought. They advocate learning through the development of meaningful conceptual thinking and judgement by means of a directed reading list of the profound, aesthetic, and meaningful great books of the Western canon. These books, secular perennialists argue, are written by the world's finest thinkers, and cumulatively comprise the "Great Conversation" of humanity with regard to the central human questions. Their basic argument for the use of original works (abridged translations being acceptable as well) is that these are the products of "genius". Hutchins remarks:

Great books are great teachers; they are showing us every day what ordinary people are capable of. These books come out of ignorant, inquiring humanity. They are usually the first announcements for success in learning. Most of them were written for, and addressed to, ordinary people.

The Great Conversation is not static but, along with the set of related great books, changes as the representative thought of man changes or progresses. In this way, it seeks to represent an evolution of thought not based upon the latest cultural fads. Hutchins clarifies this:

In the course of history... new books have been written that have won their place in the list. Books once thought entitled to belong to it have been superseded; and this process of change will continue as long as men can think and write. It is the task of every generation to reassess the tradition in which it lives, to discard what it cannot use, and to bring into context with the distant and intermediate past the most recent contributions to the Great Conversation. ...the West needs to recapture and reemphasize and bring to bear upon its present problems the wisdom that lies in the works of its greatest thinkers and in the name of love

Perennialism was proposed in response to what many considered a failing educational system. Again Hutchins writes:

The products of American high schools are illiterate; and a degree from a famous college or university is no guarantee that the graduate is in any better case. One of the most remarkable features of American society is that the difference between the "uneducated" and the "educated" is so slight.

In this regard John Dewey and Hutchins were in agreement. Hutchins's book The Higher Learning in America deplored the "plight of higher learning" that had turned away from cultivation of the intellect and toward anti-intellectual practicality due, in part, to a lust for money. In a highly negative review of the book, Dewey wrote a series of articles in The Social Frontier which began by applauding Hutchins' attack on "the aimlessness of our present educational scheme.

Perennialists believe that reading is supplemented by mutual investigations involving both teacher and student and minimally-directed discussions through the Socratic method in order to develop a historically oriented understanding of concepts. They argue that accurate, independent reasoning distinguishes the developed or educated mind and stress the development of this faculty. A skilled teacher keeps discussions on topic, corrects errors in reasoning, and accurately formulates problems within the scope of texts being studied but lets the class reach their own conclusions.

Perennialists argue that many of the historical debates and the development of ideas presented by the great books are relevant to any society at any time, making them suitable for instructional use regardless of their age. They acknowledge disagreement between various great books but believe that the student must learn to recognize these disagreements, think about them, and reach a reasoned, defensible conclusion. This is a major goal of the Socratic discussions.

== Religious perennialism ==
Perennialism was originally religious in nature, developed first by Thomas Aquinas in the thirteenth century in his work On the Teacher.

In the nineteenth century, John Henry Newman presented a defense of religious perennialism in The Idea of a University. Discourse 5 of that work, "Knowledge Its Own End", is a recent statement of a Christian educational perennialism.

There are several epistemological options, which affect the pedagogical options. The possibilities may be surveyed by considering four extreme positions - idealistic rationalism, idealistic fideism, realistic rationalism and realistic fideism.

Teaching pupils to think critically and rationally are the main objectives of perennialist educators.

== Colleges exemplifying this philosophy ==
- Reed College in Portland, Oregon is a secular liberal arts college which requires a year-long humanities course covering literature, history, art, religion, and philosophy from the ancient Mediterranean world and North America. Students may pursue an optional extension to this core curriculum in later years.
- St. John's College in Annapolis, Maryland and Santa Fe, New Mexico is a secular liberal arts college "where students study the works of history's great thinkers." Its reading list and Great Books curriculum, in which all students read the "foundational texts of Western civilization," was adopted in 1937.
- The Core Curriculum of Columbia College of Columbia University is structured around the humanities, contemporary civilization, and science. All students are required to take humanities courses in which they study representative works of art, literature, and music.
- Mortimer Adler and Robert Maynard Hutchins sought to base the original Core Curriculum at the University of Chicago in "the spirit of the 'Great Books.'″
- The curriculum of the Integral Program of Liberal Arts at Saint Mary's College of California is based in the Great Books. The program was designed with the assistance of faculty from St. John's College.
- Thomas Aquinas College in Santa Paula, California is a Catholic Christian college with a Great Books curriculum. The college was founded by a group of graduates and professors of the Integral Program at Saint Mary's College of California, who were discouraged by the liberalism that became common place among the faculty and administration on Saint Mary's campus shortly after Vatican II.
- Gutenberg College in Eugene, Oregon provides "a broad-based liberal arts education in a Protestant Christian environment" and a curriculum based on the "Great Books."
- Shimer Great Books School, part of North Central College in Naperville, Illinois, has a curriculum based in the Great Books and the classical liberal arts.
- The Torrey Honors College at Biola University is a Christian Great Books program.
- George Wythe University in Salt Lake City was an unaccredited university with a curriculum based on "the classics of Western Civilization."
- Thomas More College of Liberal Arts in Merrimack, New Hampshire is a Catholic College with an integrated Liberal Arts Curriculum. The program includes music, homesteading, and woodworking guilds and a "Rome Semester" in which students study ancient and medieval art and architecture in Italy.
- The Great Books Program at Benedictine College in Atchison, Kansas allows students to fulfill general educational requirements through the study of classic works from classical antiquity to the modern era.

== See also ==
- Philosophy of Education
- Education reform
- Aristotelianism
- Thomism
- Paidea proposal, a reform plan initiated by Adler for public schools
- Lindy effect
