= E. D. Hirsch =

American literary critic

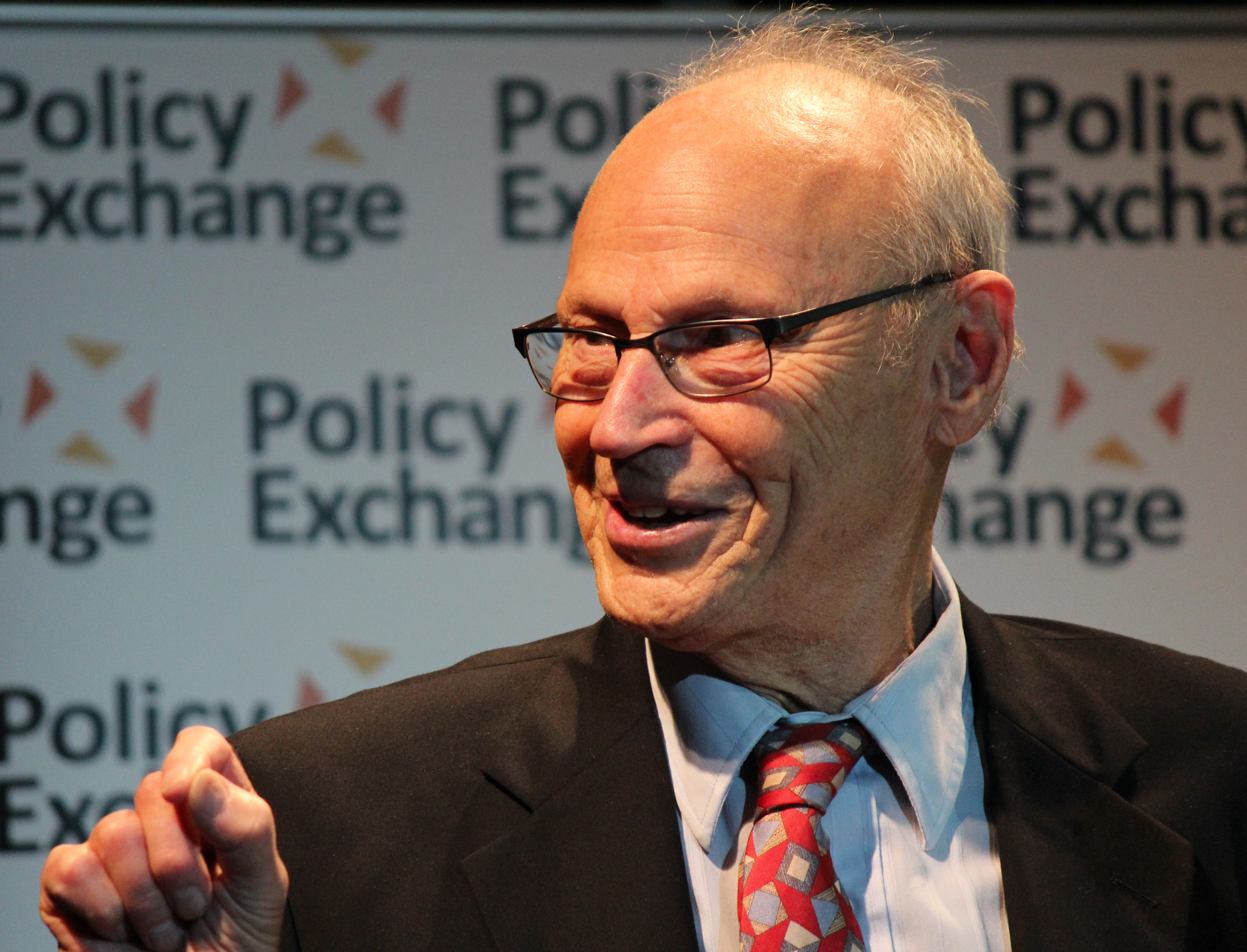
- Hirsch in 2015
- Born: Eric Donald Hirsch Jr. March 22, 1928 (age 98); Memphis, Tennessee, U.S.
- Known for: Founding the Core Knowledge Foundation
- Spouses: Gertrud Erna Winkelsen (m. 1956); Mary Montieth Pope (m. 1958; died 2015); Natasha Tobin (m. 2016)

Academic background
- Education: Cornell University (BA); Yale University (PhD)

Academic work
- Discipline: Education; English
- Institutions: Yale University; University of Virginia
- Notable works: Validity in Interpretation (1967); Cultural Literacy (1987)
- Notable ideas: Cultural literacy
- Influenced: Michael Gove; Nuno Crato

Eric Donald Hirsch Jr. (/hɜːrʃ/; born March 22, 1928) is an American educator, literary critic, and theorist. He is a professor emeritus of humanities at the University of Virginia.

Hirsch is best known for his 1987 book Cultural Literacy, which was a national best-seller and catalyst for the standards movement in American education. Cultural Literacy included a list of approximately 5,000 "names, phrases, dates, and concepts every American should know" to be "culturally literate". Hirsch's arguments for cultural literacy and the list's contents were controversial and widely debated until the early 1990s.

Hirsch is the founder and chairman of the non-profit Core Knowledge Foundation, which publishes and periodically updates the Core Knowledge Sequence, a set of unusually detailed curriculum guidelines for pre-K through eighth grade.

In 1991, Hirsch and the Core Knowledge Foundation published What Your First Grader Needs to Know, the first volume in what is popularly known as "the Core Knowledge Series". Additional volumes followed, as did revised editions. The series now begins with What Your Preschooler Needs to Know and ends with What Your Sixth Grader Needs to Know. The "series" books follow the curriculum guidelines of the Core Knowledge Sequence, are commonly used in Core Knowledge schools and other elementary schools, and have also become a favorite among homeschooling parents. The foundation opted not to create volumes for the seventh and eighth grades, noting that middle school content becomes too complex and vast to effectively compress into single-volume books.

Before turning to education, Hirsch wrote on English literature and theory of interpretation. His book Validity in Interpretation (1967) is considered an important contribution to hermeneutics. In it, Hirsch argues for intentionalism—the idea that the reader's goal should be to recover the author's meaning.

== Early life and education ==
Hirsch was born on March 22, 1928, in Memphis, Tennessee. His parents were Eric Donald Hirsch Sr. and Leah (Aschaffenburg) Hirsch. His father was a cotton broker who worked for Allenberg Cotton and was honored as "Cotton Man of the Year for 1956".

Hirsch attended Memphis public schools, the Pentecost Garrison School (Memphis), the Metairie Park Country Day School (New Orleans), and the Todd School for Boys (Woodstock, Illinois).

In 1950, Hirsch graduated from Cornell University in Ithaca, New York, with a B.A. in English. After a brief stint in the naval reserves, he enrolled in the Ph.D. program in English literature at Yale University, completing his doctorate in 1957.

== Work on Romantic poets ==
From 1956 to 1966, Hirsch taught in the English Department at Yale University. During this time, most of his academic work concerned the English Romantic poets.

Hirsch's first book, Wordsworth and Schelling, was a revision of his doctoral dissertation. In the book, he explicates Wordsworth's philosophic ideas and poems by juxtaposing them with the ideas of the German philosopher Friedrich Schelling.

In 1964, Hirsch published his second book, Innocence and Experience: An Introduction to Blake. In this book, Hirsch took issue with "systematic" critics of Blake's work, including Northrop Frye and Harold Bloom. Hirsch argued that Blake's ideas and outlook changed radically over time and that early works like The Songs of Innocence do not express the same worldview as later works like The Songs of Experience.

== UVA and Hermeneutics ==
In 1966, Hirsch started teaching English at the University of Virginia in Charlottesville, Virginia. The next year, he published Validity in Interpretation (1967). This was his first book-length work on hermeneutics and theory of interpretation. However, it was not his first published work on the subject. He had previously published an article, "Objective Interpretation" (PMLA, 1960) and a review of the German edition of Hans-Georg Gadamer's Truth and Method (Review of Metaphysics, 1965). Both early pieces were reprinted as appendices in Validity in Interpretation.

In Validity in Interpretation, Hirsch defends what he calls "the sensible belief that a text means what its author meant." He argues that it is possible (at least in some cases) for readers to recover an author's intended meaning—and that readers should make this the goal of interpretation. Hirsch makes a distinction between the "meaning" of a text, which does not change over time, and the "significance" of the text, which does change over time. In addition, he argues that objectivity in interpretation is possible and that we can have objective knowledge in humanistic studies.

In a review of important works on interpretation, Sherri Irvin gives the following summary of Validity in Interpretation:

The seminal statement of actual intentionalism: Hirsch holds that 'meaning is an affair of consciousness and not of physical signs or things' (23), though he allows that linguistic convention constrains the meanings the author can intend for a particular utterance. He argues that the author's intention is necessary to fix meaning, since the application of conventions alone would typically leave a text wildly indeterminate.

Hirsch's "intentionalist" and "objectivist" views on hermeneutics are close to those of the Italian jurist Emilio Betti. On the other hand, his views run largely contrary to the views of Martin Heidegger and his student Hans-Georg Gadamer as well as the views of W. K. Wimsatt and Monroe Beardsley on the "semantic autonomy" of works of literature, as expressed in "The Intentional Fallacy."

Hirsch continued to publish on hermeneutics and the concept of authorial intent in the late 1960s and early 1970s, and many of his articles from this period are collected in his second book on hermeneutics, The Aims of Interpretation (1975).

Hirsch's views on hermeneutics have been widely cited—Google Scholar lists more than 4,400 citations for Validity in Interpretation—but they have also been widely criticized.

== Composition and Theory of Writing ==
In the early 1970s Hirsch began working on the theory of writing and composition, publishing several articles and a book, The Philosophy of Composition (1977). Hirsch called the central concept in this book "relative readability". One piece of writing is more readable, in terms of relative readability, than another if it conveys the same meaning but is easier to read and read more quickly than the alternative passage. The Philosophy of Composition was widely reviewed and generated numerous discussions in composition circles for several years, but Hirsch's work in this area is no longer widely discussed.

In the late 1970s, Hirsch and certain colleagues at the University of Virginia ran a series of experiments on relative readability. Participants in the experiments were assigned either a well-written passage or a poorly written (stylistically degraded) version of the same passage. Hirsch and his colleagues recorded reading time to determine whether the well-written passages were in fact read more quickly, as they predicted they would be. They discovered that they were. However, they also discovered that there was another factor that was even more important than relative readability: if the students lacked crucial background knowledge, they struggled to read both the poorly written and the well-written passage. This became particularly clear while Hirsch was running tests at the J. Sargeant Reynolds Community College in Virginia. The community college students did not know who Ulysses S. Grant and Robert E. Lee were and, as a result, they struggled to make sense of a passage on the U.S. Civil War. Hirsch observed that these students lacked "cultural literacy". They had adequate decoding skills for reading, but they began to struggle when they lacked relevant background knowledge.

== Cultural Literacy ==
Hirsch was dismayed that community college students, raised in Virginia, where much of the Civil War was fought, had not heard of Robert E. Lee, who commanded the Confederate States Army, or Ulysses S. Grant, who led the Union Army, or the roles these men played in the American Civil War. He began to push for the teaching of cultural literacy in grades K–12, especially K–8. His main objective, as he has frequently noted, was to help disadvantaged students attain cultural literacy and improve their reading comprehension.

In a 1981 presentation to the Modern Language Association, Hirsch introduced his theory on the connection between literacy in general and cultural literacy. A version of his MLA paper was published in 1983 as an article, "Cultural Literacy," in The American Scholar.

In 1983, the Exxon Education Foundation provided support for further research. With this funding, Hirsch set up a team that began to compile lists of terms that "culturally literate" people know but young people and disadvantaged people may need to learn. This would become the appendix of his 1987 book, an unannotated list of approximately "5,000 names, phrases, dates, and concepts", representing the "necessary minimum of American general knowledge".

In 1986, Hirsch established the non-profit Cultural Literacy Foundation, with a goal of developing a fact-rich core curriculum and piloting it in selected elementary schools.

In 1987, Hirsch's Cultural Literacy appeared. The book became a national best-seller, rising to #2 on the non-fiction New York Times Best Seller list. Hirsch's book was often reviewed with and discussed in tandem with another education book published at roughly the same time, Allan Bloom's The Closing of the American Mind. These two books convinced many readers that there were problems with American education. Hirsch's book "spurred a growing movement for prescriptive cultural literacy and standards in general." This resulted in a recommendation by the United States Department of Education that "cultural literacy should inform the content of the American educational system."

Hirsch eventually distanced himself from Bloom's book.

In 1988, Hirsch co-authored the Dictionary of Cultural Literacy with Joseph Kett and James Trefil. In 1989, Hirsch was the editor of A First Dictionary of Cultural Literacy. In 1991, Hirsch and his colleagues issued What Your First Grader Needs to Know, the first in the popular Core Knowledge series.

One early supporter of the Core Knowledge movement was Columbia University's Diane Ravitch, an education historian. Against the backdrop of the release of a scathing report on education in the United States—A Nation at Risk—Ravitch encouraged Hirsch to publish Cultural Literacy as a non-fiction book in 1987. The book included an unannotated list of approximately "5,000 names, phrases, dates, and concepts" every American should know to be culturally literate. (Note: By the time her 2016, reprint of her best-selling book was published, Ravitch had become disillusioned with Bill & Melinda Gates Foundation's Common Core initiative that had produced presented a "comprehensive, coherent sequence of thematic curriculum units connecting the skills outlined in the CCSS with suggested student objectives, texts, activities, and much more (Schneider 2019) becoming disillusioned by the Gates’-funded Common Core. She said the "fundamental error of the Common Core standards is that they were written by a small group of people without the involvement of classroom teachers and scholars in the respective fields. They were written with remarkable speed but without any public review process. There were no means by which to revise them after they were published. States could add up to 15 percent additional content, but could subtract or change nothing. It was a missed opportunity to do it right. The toxicity of the Common Core standards persuaded me that it is fruitless to rely on national curriculum standards as a solution to education problems."Ravitch, Diane (2016) [2010]. The Death and Life of the Great American School System: How Testing and Choice Are Undermining Education (3rd ed.).)

By 1988, Hirsch was featured in the New York Times, as a "self-proclaimed crusade against noneducation" in his role as president of the Cultural Literacy Foundation, headquartered in Charlottesville. The Foundation monitored the "spread of ignorance and illiteracy in the United States" and made "proposals for remedying it".

By 1990, Core Knowledge had approximately 2,500 members and was largely self-supporting; however, it continued to use grant money for large projects.

By 2015, Hirsch and his Core Knowledge Foundation had become an "increasingly popular primary source for the Common Core movement". The emphasis is placed "more on what should be known rather than how to know"—"content knowledge" is central to learning and "knowledge acquisition is treated as a commodity or product to be dispensed".

== Criticism of school systems ==
In his 1996 book The Schools We Need and Why We Don't Have Them, Hirsch was extremely critical of the American education system, which he described as a "Thoughtworld" hostile to research-based findings and dissenting ideas.

Throughout his career, Hirsch denounced the influence of 19th-century romanticism on American culture in general, and on progressive educational ideas in particular. He said that romanticism, and writers and artists who espoused the romantic worldview—such as Jean-Jacques Rousseau, William Blake, William Wordsworth, Friedrich Wilhelm Joseph Schelling, and Samuel Taylor Coleridge—"elevated all that is natural and disparaged all that is artificial". Hirsch sees the romanticism-inspired progressivists as in opposition to the intellectuals—the classicist, the modernist, the pragmatist, and the scientist.

In The Schools We Need, Hirsch said that, "Higher-level skills critically depend upon the automatic mastery of repeated lower-level activities." In his 1999 book, The Schools Our Children Deserve: Moving Beyond Traditional Classrooms and Tougher Standards, Alfie Kohn said that Hirsch's "starting with the basics" model "reflects a particular model of learning"—behaviorism—"which has lost credibility among experts in the field even as it retains a stranglehold on the popular consciousness".

In 2006, Hirsch published The Knowledge Deficit, in which he continued the argument made in Cultural Literacy. Hirsch argued that disappointing results on reading tests can be traced back to a knowledge deficit that keeps students from making sense of what they read. While Hirsch's observation that "students cannot make sense of what they read" was correct, he did not necessarily connect it to the fundamental issues why students were having trouble reading. The investigative work done by the investigative journalist, Emily Hanford, and published through the podcast "sold a story", throws light on the fundamental reasons behind the lack of reading literacy amongst a portion of a whole generation of American children.

In 2009, he published The Making of Americans: Democracy and Our Schools, in which he makes the case that the true mission of the schools is to prepare citizens for participation in our democracy by embracing a common-core, knowledge-rich curriculum as opposed to what Hirsch claims to be the current content-free approach. He laments 60 years without curriculum in US schools because of the anti-curriculum approach championed by John Dewey and other Progressives.

In 2016, he published "Why Knowledge Matters: Rescuing our Children from Failed Educational Theories", outlining the three major problems with education in the United States: the emphasis on teaching skills, such as critical thinking skills, rather than knowledge; individualism rather than communal learning; and developmentalism, that is, teaching children what is "appropriate" for their age.

== Core Knowledge ==
Hirsch established the non-profit Core Knowledge Foundation and serves as its director. The Foundation began publishing its Core Knowledge Sequence in the 1990s. This includes eight books as part of the Core Knowledge Grader Series of books. The series begins with What Your Preschooler Needs to Know and ends with What Your Sixth Grader Needs to Know. The series, which has been revised and updated over the years, has been particularly popular with parents who homeschool, as well as parents whose children attend Core Knowledge schools.

In 2011, a British version of The Core Knowledge Sequence was published online. The books began to be adapted for the UK, beginning with What Your Year 1 Child Needs to Know.

By 2015, there were about 1,260 schools in the US (across 46 states and the District of Columbia) using all or part of the Core Knowledge Sequence. The Foundation believes that the actual number is much higher, but only counts schools that submit a "profile form" to the Foundation annually. The profile of Core Knowledge Schools in the US is diverse—including public, charter, private, and parochial schools in urban, suburban and, rural locations. Independent nonprofit GreatSchools.org reports that more than 400 of these schools are preschools.

In his 2014 article published by Thomas B. Fordham Institute, Robert Pondiscio, the author of How the Other Half Learns in which he reviewed Success Academy, Pondiscio said if the Common Core State Standards Initiative was "properly understood and implemented", it would be a "delivery mechanism" for Hirsch's "ideas and work" and his Core Knowledge curriculum. Hirsch was not directly involved in developing the Common Core State Standards adopted in 46 states and the District of Columbia; some education watchers credit E. D. Hirsch as having provided the "intellectual foundation" for the initiative. Pondiscio said that Politico had paired David Coleman—main author of the Common Core State Standards in English Language Arts—with Hirsch in eighth place on their 2014 list of fifty "thinkers, doers and dreamers who really matter."

=== Reviews of Hirsch's work ===
A 1999 Baltimore Sun article said Hirsch's system had succeeded in "producing educated children" but ignited an "education controversy" which has been "very good for [Hirsch's] business". Hirsch said that he specifically designed a curriculum that would "place all children on common ground, sharing a common body of knowledge. That's one way to secure civil rights."

Sol Stern, a senior fellow at the Manhattan Institute who has written extensively on education reform, described Hirsch's "curriculum for democracy" in 2009 as "content-rich pedagogy" that makes better citizens and smarter kids. Stern said in 2013 that Hirsch was "the most important education reformer of the past half-century." Stern said that William Bennett, a prominent conservative who served as Chair of the National Endowment for the Humanities and later US Secretary of Education, was an early proponent of Hirsch's views.

The Core Knowledge Foundation self-describes itself as non-partisan. Hirsch himself is an avowed Democrat who has described himself as "practically a socialist". In his 2010 article in the Claremont Review of Books, Terrence O. Moore cited Hirsch, who self-described as a "political liberal" had been "forced to become an educational conservative". Moore said that Hirsch's Left was the "Old Left". In The Making of Americans (2010), Hirsch said that he was a "political liberal" who was "forced to become an educational conservative" after he had "recognized the relative inertness and stability of the shared background knowledge students need to master reading and writing." He said that the "democratic goal of high universal literacy would require schools to practice a large measure of educational traditionalism".

In his 2009 article, published online by Grove City College's Institute for Faith and Freedom, by education and history teacher, Jason R. Edwards, said that Hirsch has been criticized by the political left for being an "elitist" whose theories could result in a "rejection of toleration, pluralism, and relativism". On the political right, Hirsch has been accused of being "totalitarian, for his idea lends itself to turning over curriculum selection to federal authorities and thereby eliminating the time-honored American tradition of locally controlled schools".

Harvard University professor Howard Gardner, best known for his theory of multiple intelligences, is a long-time critic of Hirsch. Gardner described one of his own books, The Disciplined Mind (1999), as part of a "sustained dialectic" with E.D. Hirsch, and criticized Hirsch's curriculum as "at best superficial and at worst anti-intellectual". In 2007, Gardner accused Hirsch of having "swallowed a neoconservative caricature of contemporary American education".

=== UK Education Secretary (Michael Gove) ===
Michael Gove, who served as Shadow Secretary of State for Children, Schools and Families and then Secretary of State for Education under Prime Minister David Cameron from 2010 to 2014, oversaw major controversial education reforms. Gove admired Hirsch's theories of education, according to a 2012 article in The Guardian. Gove revised the national curriculum, which included "hard facts", allegedly influenced by Hirsch. In 2014, the Core Knowledge books were published in the U.K. by Civitas, which is widely characterized in the national news media as "right-of-centre". Inspection conducted by the Office for Standards in Education, Children's Services and Skills (Ofsted) had faced criticism since at least 2008, as a threat to social learning.

A 2010 article in the U.K.-based TES described Core Knowledge as a "kind of national curriculum" that outlines Hirsch's ideas on what "children should know in English language and literature, history, geography, math, science, music, and art".

=== Influence in other countries ===
==== Portugal ====
E. D. Hirsch was first invited to Portugal in 2004 by the then minister of education, David Justino, and then participated in two conferences organized by Nuno Crato. On the occasion, he was interviewed by various media. His points of view were part of the public educational debate developed for a few years after his visit.

Later, his ideas were very influential, namely during the tenure of minister Nuno Crato (2011–2015) in which the curricula were reorganized and detailed learning outcomes ("metas curriculares") were introduced. These learning outcomes explicitly highlight the essential knowledge students should master and were built in a progressive, systematic, and layered fashion inspired by Hirsch's ideas. Various analysts attribute to these rigorous and demanding standards, among other factors, the notable 2015 improvement in Portuguese student results in PISA and TIMSS international studies.

== Personal life ==
Hirsch was married to Gertrud Erna Winkelsen from 1956 and to Mary Monteith Pope from 1958 until she died in 2015. He is currently married to Natasha "Tasha" Tobin.

He has four children.

== Fellowships, awards and memberships ==
Hirsch has been awarded several fellowships and honors, including the Fulbright Fellowship (1955), the Morse Fellowship (1960), the Guggenheim Fellowship (1964), the Explicator Prize (1965), the NEA Fellowship (1970), the NEH Senior Fellowship (1971–72), the Wesleyan University Center for the Humanities Fellowship (1973), the Princeton University Fellowship in the Humanities (1977), and the Center for Advanced Study in the Behavioral Sciences Fellowship at Stanford University (1980–81).

At the University of Virginia, he was Linden Kent Memorial Professor of English Emeritus, in addition to Professor of Education and Humanities.

He has received honorary degrees from Rhodes College and Williams College.

He is a member of the American Academy of Arts and Sciences, and a board member of the Albert Shanker Institute. He lives in Charlottesville, Virginia.

== Works ==
- Wordsworth and Schelling (1960)
- Innocence and Experience: An Introduction to Blake (1964)
- Validity in Interpretation (Yale University Press, 1967) JSTOR j.ctt32bd9k
- The Aims of Interpretation (1976)
- The Philosophy of Composition (1977)
- Cultural Literacy: What Every American Needs to Know (1987)
- The Dictionary of Cultural Literacy (1988)
- A First Dictionary of Cultural Literacy (1989)
- The Schools We Need: And Why We Don't Have Them (1996)
- "The Validity of Allegory" in Convegno internazionale sul tema ermeneutica e critica (1996)
- The New Dictionary of Cultural Literacy: What Every American Needs to Know by E. D. Hirsch, Joseph F. Kett and James Trefil (2002)
- The New First Dictionary of Cultural Literacy: What Your Child Needs to Know (2002)
- The Knowledge Deficit: Closing the Shocking Education Gap for American Children (2006)
- The Making of Americans: Democracy and Our Schools (2010)
- Why Knowledge Matters (2016)
- How to educate a citizen: The power of shared knowledge to unify a nation. Harper. 2020. ISBN 978-0-06-300192-3.

== See also ==
- The Core Knowledge Foundation
- Daniel T. Willingham
