= William Bagley (educator) =

American educator (1874–1946)

William Chandler Bagley (March 15, 1874, in Detroit – July 1, 1946, in New York City), was an American educator and editor. He graduated in 1895 from Michigan State Agricultural College, currently called Michigan State University; completed MS, in 1898, from the University of Wisconsin–Madison, 1898; and was awarded PhD by Cornell University in 1900. Bagley was one of the founders of Kappa Delta Pi, the National Professional Association and Honor Society for Educators, at the University of Illinois in 1911.

He taught in elementary schools before becoming (1908) professor of education at the University of Illinois, where he served as the director of the School of Education from 1908 until 1917. He was professor of education at Teachers College, Columbia, from 1917 to 1940. An opponent of pragmatism and progressive education, Bagley insisted on the value of knowledge for its own sake, not merely as an instrument, and he criticized his colleagues for their failure to emphasize systematic study of academic subjects. Of his many works, Education and Emergent Man (1934) contains the clearest exposition of his educational philosophy. His other writings include:

- The Educative Process (1905).
- Education and Utility (1909).
- Educational Values (1911).
- Craftsmanship in Teaching by William Chandler Bagley at Project Gutenberg (1911).
- School Discipline (1914).
- History of the American People (1923, co-authored with Charles A. Beard)
- Determinism in Education (1925).
- Education, Crime, and Social Progress (1931).

A champion of educational essentialism, Bagley said "gripping and enduring interests frequently grow out of initial learning efforts that are not appealing or attractive."

Bagley was editor in chief of the Journal of the National Education Association (1920-1925) and School and Society (1939-1946).
