= Core Knowledge Foundation =

Education reform organisation

- Formation: 1986
- Founder: E. D. Hirsch, Jr.
- Headquarters: Charlottesville, Virginia
- President: Beth Battle Anderson

The Core Knowledge Foundation is an independent, non-profit educational foundation founded in 1986 by E. D. Hirsch, Jr. The school curriculum created by the Foundation focuses on teaching students a foundation of knowledge at a young age; the desired outcome is that students will be better equipped for "effective participation and mutual understanding in the wider society."

As of April 2006, Core Knowledge schools were 44% public, 35% charter, 15% private, and 6% parochial. Additionally, they were 39% urban, 39% suburban, and 22% rural.
