= Active learning =

Educational technique

Active learning is "a method of learning in which students are actively or experientially involved in the learning process and where there are different levels of active learning, depending on student involvement." Bonwell & Eison (1991) states that "students participate [in active learning] when they are doing something besides passively listening." According to Hanson and Moser (2003) using active teaching techniques in the classroom can create better academic outcomes for students. Scheyvens, Griffin, Jocoy, Liu, & Bradford (2008) further noted that "by utilizing learning strategies that can include small-group work, role-play and simulations, data collection and analysis, active learning is purported to increase student interest and motivation and to build students ‘critical thinking, problem-solving and social skills". In a report from the Association for the Study of Higher Education, authors discuss a variety of methodologies for promoting active learning. They cite literature that indicates students must do more than just listen in order to learn. They must read, write, discuss, and be engaged in solving problems. This process relates to the three learning domains referred to as knowledge, skills and attitudes (KSA). This taxonomy of learning behaviors can be thought of as "the goals of the learning process." In particular, students must engage in such higher-order thinking tasks as analysis, synthesis, and evaluation.

== Nature of active learning ==
There are a wide range of alternatives for the term active learning and specific strategies, such as: learning through play, technology-based learning, activity-based learning, group work, project method, etc. The common factors in these are some significant qualities and characteristics of active learning. Active learning is the opposite of passive learning; it is learner-centered, not teacher-centered, and requires more than just listening; the active participation of each and every student is a necessary aspect in active learning. Students must be doing things and simultaneously think about the work done and the purpose behind it so that they can enhance their higher order thinking capabilities.

Studies have shown that active learning as a strategy has promoted achievement levels and some others say that content mastery is possible through active learning strategies. However, some students as well as teachers find it difficult to adapt to the new learning technique.

There are intensive uses of scientific and quantitative literacy across the curriculum, and technology-based learning is also in high demand in concern with active learning.

Barnes (1989) suggested principles of active learning:

1. Purposive: the relevance of the task to the students' concerns.
2. Reflective: students' reflection on the meaning of what is learned.
3. Negotiated: negotiation of goals and methods of learning between students and teachers.
4. Critical: students appreciate different ways and means of learning the content.
5. Complex: students compare learning tasks with complexities existing in real life and making reflective analysis.
6. Situation-driven: the need of the situation is considered in order to establish learning tasks.
7. Engaged: real life tasks are reflected in the activities conducted for learning.

Active learning requires appropriate learning environments through the implementation of correct strategy. Characteristics of learning environment are:

1. Aligned with constructivist strategies and evolved from traditional philosophies.
2. Promoting research based learning through investigation and contains authentic scholarly content.
3. Encouraging leadership skills of the students through self-development activities.
4. Creating atmosphere suitable for collaborative learning for building knowledgeable learning communities.
5. Cultivating a dynamic environment through interdisciplinary learning and generating high-profile activities for a better learning experience.
6. Integration of prior with new knowledge to incur a rich structure of knowledge among the students.
7. Task-based performance enhancement by giving the students a realistic practical sense of the subject matter learnt in the classroom.

== Teacher's characteristics in active learning ==
A study by Jerome I. Rotgans and Henk G. Schmidt showed a correlation between three teachers' characteristics and students' situational interest in an active learning classroom.

Situational interest is defined as "focused attention and an affective reaction that is triggered in the moment by environmental stimuli, which may or may not last over time" according to Hidi and Renninger.

Students' situational interest is inspired by three teacher traits as represented in the study. The three traits are social congruence, subject-matter expertise, and cognitive congruence:

1. When a teacher is socially congruent which means that he/she has a harmonious interaction with the student, the positive relationship allows students to express their opinions and participate without fear of making mistakes. Also, students will ask questions when the topic is not clear; as a result, they become more interested in the classroom.
2. Subject-matter expertise: When a teacher is an expert and has a broad knowledge of the subject being taught, students are expected to work harder and put more effort into their work. In contrast, If a teacher is less knowledgeable, students might lose interest in learning. Moreover, expert teachers are more helpful to their students in an effective way. This trait will positively impact student's success during the active learning process.
3. Cognitive congruence: This happens when a teacher can simplify hard concepts and use simple terms, so students can easily understand the topic. The teacher guides the students in the learning process by asking questions and allowing students to share their thoughts without interruption. As a result, students will trust their ability to learn on their own and will develop an organized way of thinking about a topic. Therefore, they will be more engaged in an active learning classroom.

== Ensuring that all students are actively learning ==
Total participation offers two major techniques for teachers to apply in their classrooms. The first helpful tool is asking students higher-order questions instead of lower-order questions. According to Bloom's Cognitive Taxonomy, a higher-order question will allow students to go beyond their basic knowledge, opening the door for their thinking to dive into new topics, and make connections related to real life. When students make these connections and analyze the topic that needs to be learned, the topic will become unforgettable. In contrast, lower-order questions are straightforward questions based on memorized facts or predictable conclusions. These types of questions may engage all students to participate but will not allow students to expand their thinking. They will likely forget the concept later because it lacks connections to real life, and their thinking didn't go through deep analysis. The second tool is called "The Ripple." This technique will ensure that every student will participate and come up with an answer regarding a higher-order question because it gives a student the time needed to think independently and generate ideas. The drawback of the traditional teaching method is that it only allows some students to respond to the prompt, while others may need extra time to develop ideas. "The Ripple" will motivate students through different stages. First, the students think independently, then they expand their ideas with peers, and finally, this discussion will expand to the whole class.

=== Constructivist framework ===
Active learning coordinates with the principles of constructivism which are, cognitive, meta-cognitive, evolving and effective in nature. Studies have shown that immediate results in construction of knowledge is not possible through active learning as the child first goes through the process of knowledge construction, knowledge recording and then knowledge absorption. This process of knowledge construction is dependent on previous knowledge of the learner where the learner is self-aware of the process of cognition and can control and regulate it by themselves. There are several aspects of learning and some of them are:

1. Learning through meaningful reception, influenced by David Ausubel, who emphasizes the previous knowledge the learner possesses and considers it a key factor in learning.
2. Learning through discovery, influenced by Jerome Bruner, where students learn through discovery of ideas with the help of situations provided by the teacher.
3. Conceptual change: misconceptions takes place as students discover knowledge without any guidance; teachers provide knowledge keeping in mind the common misconceptions about the content and keep an evaluatory check on the knowledge constructed by the students.
4. Constructivism, influenced by researchers such as Lev Vygotsky, suggests collaborative group work within the framework of cognitive strategies like questioning, clarifying, predicting and summarizing.

== Science of active learning ==
Active learning can be used effectively for teaching comprehension and memory. The reason it is efficient is that it draws on underlying characteristics of how the brain operates during learning. These characteristics have been documented by thousands of empirical studies (e.g., Smith & Kosslyn, 2011) and have been organized into a set of principles. Each of these principles can be drawn on by various active learning exercises. They also offer a framework for designing activities that will promote learning; when used systematically, Stephen Kosslyn (2017) notes these principles enable students to "learn effectively—sometimes without even trying to learn".

=== The principles of learning ===
One way to organize the empirical literature on learning and memory specifies 16 distinct principles, which fall under two umbrella "maxims". The first maxim, "Think it Through", includes principles related to paying close attention and thinking deeply about new information. The second, "Make and Use Associations", focuses on techniques for organizing, storing, and retrieving information.

The principles can be summarized as follows.

==== Maxim I: Think it through ====
The first maxim emphasizes deep and active engagement with information rather than processing it at a superficial level. It draws on research into deep processing, which suggests that learning is strengthened when individuals extend their thinking beyond the “face value” of information and connect it with meaning and prior knowledge.

The maxim also incorporates the concept of desirable difficulty, whereby learning activities should be sufficiently challenging to promote cognitive effort without becoming overwhelming. Related to this is the generation effect, which demonstrates that information is remembered more effectively when learners actively retrieve or generate it themselves rather than passively receiving it.

The principle further stresses the importance of deliberate practice, in which learners focus on identifying and correcting errors through sustained and purposeful repetition. It also highlights the value of interleaving, or mixing different types of problems and tasks during study, which has been shown to improve long-term retention and transfer of learning.

In addition, the maxim advocates dual coding, the presentation of information through both verbal and visual forms, which can improve comprehension and recall. Finally, it recognizes the role of emotion in memory formation, noting that emotionally engaging material is often remembered more effectively than emotionally neutral information.

==== Maxim II: Make and use associations ====
- Promoting chunking: collecting information into organized units (Brown, Roediger, & McDaniel, 2014; Mayer & Moreno, 2003)
- Building on prior associations: connecting new information to previously stored information (Bransford, Brown, & Cocking, 2000; Glenberg & Robertson, 1999; Mayer, 2001)
- Presenting foundational material first: providing basic information as a structural "spine" onto which new information can be attached (Bransford, Brown, & Cocking, 2000; Wandersee, Mintzes, & Novak, 1994)
- Exploiting appropriate examples: offering examples of the same idea in multiple contexts (Hakel & Halpern, 2005)
- Relying on principles, not rote: explicitly characterizing the dimensions, factors or mechanisms that underlie a phenomenon (Kozma & Russell, 1997; Bransford, Brown, & Cocking, 2000)
- Creating associative chaining: sequencing chunks of information into stories (Bower & Clark, 1969; Graeser, Olde, & Klettke, 2002)
- Using spaced practice: spreading learning out over time (Brown, Roediger, & McDaniel, 2014; Cepeda et al., 2006, 2008; Cull, 2000)
- Establishing different contexts: associating material with a variety of settings (Hakel & Halpern, 2005; Van Merrienboer et al., 2006)
- Avoiding interference: incorporating distinctive retrieval cues to avoid confusion (Adams, 1967; Anderson & Neely, 1996)

Active learning typically draws on combinations of these principles. For example, a well-run debate will draw on virtually all, with the exceptions of dual coding, interleaving, and spaced practice. In contrast, passively listening to a lecture rarely draws on any.

== Active learning exercises ==
Bonwell and Eison (1991) suggested learners work collaboratively, discuss materials while role-playing, debate, engage in case study, take part in cooperative learning, or produce short written exercises, etc. The argument is "when should active learning exercises be used during instruction?". Numerous studies have shown that introducing active learning activities (such as simulations, games, contrasting cases, labs,..) before, rather than after lectures or readings, results in deeper learning, understanding, and transfer. The degree of instructor guidance students need while being "active" may vary according to the task and its place in a teaching unit.

In an active learning environment learners are immersed in experiences within which they engage in meaning-making inquiry, action, imagination, invention, interaction, hypothesizing and personal reflection.

Examples of "active learning" activities include

- A class discussion may be held in person or in an online environment. Discussions can be conducted with any class size, although it is typically more effective in smaller group settings. This environment allows for instructor guidance of the learning experience. Discussion requires the learners to think critically on the subject matter and use logic to evaluate their and others' positions. As learners are expected to discuss material constructively and intelligently, a discussion is a good follow-up activity given the unit has been sufficiently covered already. Some of the benefits of using discussion as a method of learning are that it helps students explore a diversity of perspectives, it increases intellectual agility, it shows respect for students' voices and experiences, it develops habits of collaborative learning, it helps students develop skills of synthesis and integration (Brookfield 2005). In addition, by having the teacher actively engage with the students, it allows for them to come to class better prepared and aware of what is taking place in the classroom.
- A think-pair-share activity is when learners take a minute to ponder the previous lesson, later to discuss it with one or more of their peers, finally to share it with the class as part of a formal discussion. It is during this formal discussion that the instructor should clarify misconceptions. However students need a background in the subject matter to converse in a meaningful way. Therefore, a "think-pair-share" exercise is useful in situations where learners can identify and relate what they already know to others. It can also help teachers or instructors to observe students and see if they understand the material being discussed. This is not a good strategy to use in large classes because of time and logistical constraints (Bonwell and Eison, 1991). Think-pair-share is helpful for the instructor as it enables organizing content and tracking students on where they are relative to the topic being discussed in class, saves time so that he/she can move to other topics, helps to make the class more interactive, provides opportunities for students to interact with each other (Radhakrishna, Ewing, and Chikthimmah, 2012).
- A learning cell is an effective way for a pair of students to study and learn together. The learning cell was developed by Marcel Goldschmid of the Swiss Federal Institute of Technology in Lausanne (Goldschmid, 1971). A learning cell is a process of learning where two students alternate asking and answering questions on commonly read materials. To prepare for the assignment, the students read the assignment and write down questions that they have about the reading. At the next class meeting, the teacher randomly puts students in pairs. The process begins by designating one student from each group to begin by asking one of their questions to the other. Once the two students discuss the question, the other student ask a question and they alternate accordingly. During this time, the teacher goes from group to group giving feedback and answering questions. This system is also called a student dyad.
- A short written exercise that is often used is the "one-minute paper". This is a good way to review materials and provide feedback. However a "one-minute paper" does not take one minute and for students to concisely summarize it is suggested that they have at least 10 minutes to work on this exercise. (See also: Quiz § In education.)
- A collaborative learning group is a successful way to learn different material for different classes. It is where you assign students in groups of 3-6 people and they are given an assignment or task to work on together. To create participation and draw on the wisdom of all the learners the classroom arrangement needs to be flexible seating to allow for the creation of small groups. (Bens, 2005)
- A student debate is an active way for students to learn because they allow students the chance to take a position and gather information to support their view and explain it to others.
- A reaction to a video is also an example of active learning.
- A small group discussion is also an example of active learning because it allows students to express themselves in the classroom. It is more likely for students to participate in small group discussions than in a normal classroom lecture because they are in a more comfortable setting amongst their peers, and from a sheer numbers perspective, by dividing the students up more students get opportunities to speak out. There are so many different ways a teacher can implement small group discussion in to the class, such as making a game out of it, a competition, or an assignment. Statistics show that small group discussions is more beneficial to students than large group discussions when it comes to participation, expressing thoughts, understanding issues, applying issues, and overall status of knowledge.
- Just-in-time teaching promotes active learning by using pre-class questions to create common ground among students and teachers before the class period begins. These warmup exercises are generally open ended questions designed to encourage students to prepare for class and to elicit student's thoughts on learning goals.
- A class game is also considered an energetic way to learn because it not only helps the students to review the course material before a big exam but it helps them to enjoy learning about a topic. Different games such as Jeopardy! and crossword puzzles always seem to get the students' minds going.
- Learning by teaching is also an example of active learning because students actively research a topic and prepare the information so that they can teach it to the class. This helps students learn their own topic even better and sometimes students learn and communicate better with their peers than their teachers.
- Gallery walk is where students in groups move around the classroom or workshop actively engaging in discussions and contributing to other groups and finally constructing knowledge on a topic and sharing it.
- In a learning factory production-related subjects can be learned interactively in a realistic learning environment.
- Problem based learning or "PBL" is an active learning strategy that provides students with the problem first and has been found as an effective strategy with topics as advanced as medicine.

== Effective strategies in large classes ==
Transformational Active Learning Experience (TALE) could be challenging in large classes where students may exceed 200, typically found in universities.

Examples of some challenges in large classes:

- Student's grades and academic performance might be decreased.
- The student's ability to think critically might be lower.
- The professor's feedback and instructions might be minimized.
- The students will become less active in the learning process.

Despite the challenges, obvious benefits can be seen; in a large class, many ideas could be generated with multiple opinions. The diverse population could expand and create strong connections and relationships between classmates.

1- Using software for students' participation without revealing their identities could be a solution to students' discomfort with representing their thoughts in front of a large population.

2-What is called the "one minute paper" could be a useful strategy for students to respond. When the teacher asks a question related to a topic that has been taught, students will write their answers individually within 60 seconds.

3- "Think-pair-share" is a method that has been used to walk students through three ways of learning. First, every student will come up with an answer regarding a question presented by the instructor. Then, Each student will share the answer with another peer for analysis and deeper thinking. Lastly, the entire class will discuss their responses together.

== Elements of high-impact practices ==
George D. Kuh identified High-Impact practices as "a specific set of practices that tended to lead to meaningful experiences for students". Kuh and his coworkers identified several elements that were important and could be applied in a wide range of learning opportunities.

1. Breaking down the skills that need to be taught, one step at a time, is more beneficial than teaching a large amount of knowledge all at the same time. This concept was developed based on the zone of proximal development theory by Lev Vygotsky (1978). In practice, students start a lesson with higher expectations and in a positive class environment. As a result, all students will picture their goals as achievable, leading them to trust their abilities and be encouraged to participate actively in their learning process. When lower-level students start to face some challenges, the teacher's role becomes crucial to provide new resources and techniques to increase students' performance.
2. Reaching effective learning will be a common result of "spaced learning". This idea was first introduced by Hermann Ebbinghaus (1913) in his book: Memory: A Contribution to Experimental Psychology. He identified spaced learning as the process of learning new information over a long period in multiple ways using different activities.
3. High-quality learning could be achievable when students have a positive relationship with their classmates and teachers. Students are more likely to get motivated and reach their goals when connecting with teachers and classmates who are supportive and helpful.
4. Having diverse backgrounds in a class allows students to be exposed to different opinions and generate new ideas when connecting with peers from different identities.

== Use of technology ==
The use of multimedia and technology tools helps enhance the atmosphere of the classroom, thereby supporting active learning. In this way, each student can engage more directly in the learning process. Teachers can use movies, videos, games, and other activities to enhance effectiveness. Technology-based learning platforms provide interactive features that support active participation and real-time feedback in learning environments, including systems such as Kahoot!, Mexty.AI or Moodle as well as other digital tools. The use of technology also reflects real-world applications, as it mirrors how technology is used outside the classroom. The combination of technology and active learning has been associated with increased student engagement, improved learning outcomes, and greater motivation, as well as stronger connections between students and real-world contexts. The theoretical foundations of this learning process are:

1. Flow: Flow is a concept to enhance the focus level of the student as each and every individual becomes aware and completely involved in the learning atmosphere. In accordance with one's own capability and potential, through self-awareness, students perform the task at hand. The first methodology to measure flow was Csikszentmihalyi's experience sampling.
2. Locus of control: Ones with high internal locus of control believe that every situation or event is attributable to their resources and behavior. Ones with high external locus of control believe that nothing is under their control.
3. Intrinsic motivation: Intrinsic motivation is a factor that deals with self-perception concerning the task at hand. Interest, attitude, and results depend on the self-perception of the given activity.

== Research evidence ==
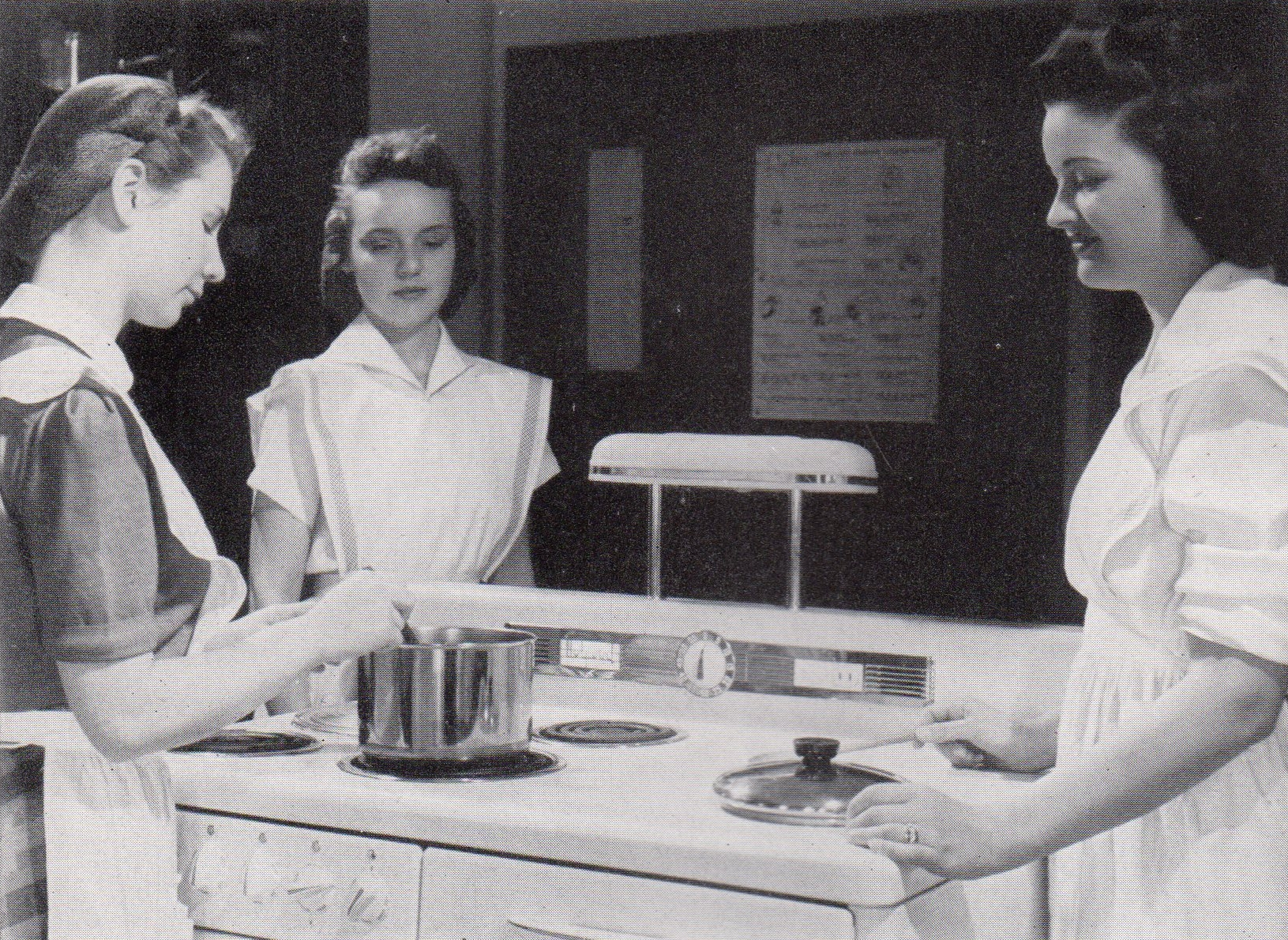
Shimer College Home Economics cooking 1942

Numerous studies have shown evidence to support active learning, given adequate prior instruction.

A meta-analysis of 225 studies comparing traditional lecture to active learning in university math, science, and engineering courses found that active learning reduces failure rates from 32% to 21%, and increases student performance on course assessments and concept inventories by 0.47 standard deviations. Because the findings were so robust with regard to study methodology, extent of controls, and subject matter, the National Academy of Sciences publication suggests that it might be unethical to continue to use traditional lecture approach as a control group in such studies. The largest positive effects were seen in class sizes under 50 students and among students under-represented in STEM fields.

Richard Hake (1998) reviewed data from over 6000 physics students in 62 introductory physics courses and found that students in classes that utilized active learning and interactive engagement techniques improved 25 percent points, achieving an average gain of 48% on a standard test of physics conceptual knowledge, the Force Concept Inventory, compared to a gain of 23% for students in traditional, lecture-based courses.

Similarly, Hoellwarth & Moelter (2011) showed that when instructors switched their physics classes from traditional instruction to active learning, student learning improved 38 percent points, from around 12% to over 50%, as measured by the Force Concept Inventory, which has become the standard measure of student learning in physics courses.

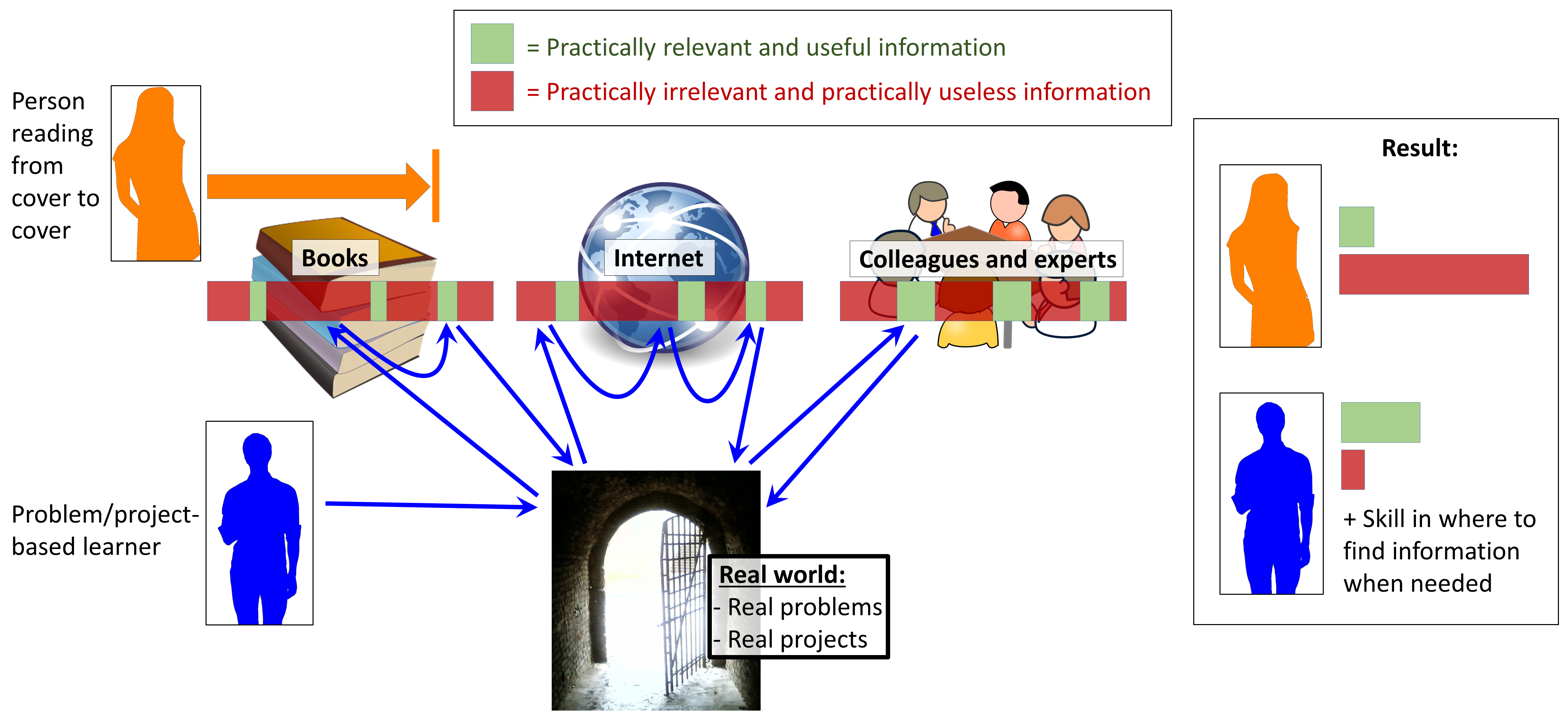
Example of problem-/project-based learning versus reading cover to cover. The problem-/project-based learner may memorize a smaller amount of total information due to actively spending time searching for the optimal information across various sources, but will likely learn more useful items for real-world scenarios, and will likely be better at knowing where to find information when needed, including technology use.

In "Does Active Learning Work? A Review of the Research", Prince (2004) found that "there is broad but uneven support for the core elements of active, collaborative, cooperative and problem-based learning" in engineering education.

Michael (2006), in reviewing the applicability of active learning to physiology education, found a "growing body of research within specific scientific teaching communities that supports and validates the new approaches to teaching that have been adopted".

In a 2012 report titled "Engage to Excel", the United States President's Council of Advisors on Science and Technology described how improved teaching methods, including engaging students in active learning, will increase student retention and improve performance in STEM courses. One study described in the report found that students in traditional lecture courses were twice as likely to leave engineering and three times as likely to drop out of college entirely compared with students taught using active learning techniques. In another cited study, students in a physics class that used active learning methods learned twice as much as those taught in a traditional class, as measured by test results.

Active learning has been implemented in large lectures, and it has been shown that both domestic and International students perceive a wide array of benefits. Research suggests that active learning can be especially beneficial for international students, helping them overcome some of the challenges posed by traditional lecture-based instruction. For example, a study of large undergraduate lectures found that international students reported significant improvements in engagement and understanding of course material after active learning strategies were introduced; many international students even expressed a preference for active learning over passive lectures, and some appeared to benefit more than their domestic peers, potentially due to social-integration factors.

Active learning approaches have also been shown to reduce the contact between students and faculty by two thirds, while maintaining learning outcomes that were at least as good, and in one case, significantly better, compared to those achieved in traditional classrooms. Additionally, students' perceptions of their learning were improved and active learning classrooms were demonstrated to lead to a more efficient use of physical space.

A 2019 study by Deslauriers et al. claimed that students have a biased perception of active learning and they feel they learn better with traditional teaching methods than active learning activities. It can be corrected by early preparation and continuous persuasion that the students are benefiting from active instruction.

In a different study conducted by Wallace et al. (2021), they came to the conclusion that in a comparison between students being taught by an active-learning instructor vs. a traditional learning instructor, students who engaged in active-learning outperformed their counterparts in exam environments. In this setting, the instructor focused on active-learning was a first-time instructor, and the individual who was teaching the traditional style of learning was a long-time instructor. The researchers acknowledged the limitations of this study in that individuals may have done better because of depth in specific sections of the class, so the researchers removed questions that could be favoring one section more than the other out of this analysis.

== See also ==
- Action teaching – Revision of article to reflect more breadth of sources
- Design-based learning – Learner centric pedagogy
- Experiential learning – Theory and philosophy of learning
- Inquisitive learning – Form of active learning
- Learning environment – Term in education
- Learning space – Physical setting for a learning environment
- Organizational learning – Academic discipline; examines how goal-driven social entities add and create knowledge
- Oswego Movement – 19th-century American education movement
- School organizational models
- Sloyd – System of handicraft-based education
- Spacing effect – Psychological effect that people learn more by spreading studying out in time
- Testing effect – Memory effect in educational psychology

== Further references ==
- Martyn, Margie (2007). "Clickers in the Classroom: An Active Learning Approach". Educause Quarterly. 30 (2). Archived from the original on 2016-11-20.
- Prince, Michael (July 2004). "Does Active Learning Work? A Review of the Research". Journal of Engineering Education. 93 (3): 223–231. doi:10.1002/j.2168-9830.2004.tb00809.x. S2CID 1165523.
