= Student voice =

Perspectives and actions of students

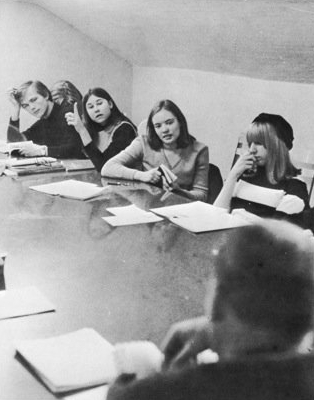
Student raising a point in a Shimer College class, 1967

Student voice is the individual and collective perspective and actions of students within the context of learning and education. It is identified in schools as both a metaphorical practice and as a pragmatic concern. Tech educator Dennis Harper noted that student voice gives students "the ability to influence learning to include policies, programs, contexts and principles."

== Practice ==
According to Adam Fletcher, student voice is a phenomenon that has always been present in schools; what makes it noticeable is the willingness of educators and others to listen to student voice. Rebecca Coda and Rick Jetter also argue that student voice should not be viewed as a form of "treason", but rather should be viewed as a partnership between adult and student.

Student voice work is premised on the following convictions:

- Young people have unique perspectives on learning, teaching, and schooling;
- Their insights warrant not only the attention but also the responses of adults; and
- They should be afforded opportunities to actively shape their education.

Several typologies differentiate the practices that identify as student voice. One identifies multiple roles for students throughout the education system, including education planning, research, teaching, evaluating, decision-making and advocacy.

=== Administrative approaches ===
The presence and engagement of student voice has been seen as essential to the educational process since at least the time of John Dewey, if not long before. In 1916 Dewey wrote extensively about the necessity of engaging student experience and perspectives in the curriculum of schools, summarizing his support by saying:

The essence of the demand for freedom is the need of conditions which will enable an individual to make his own special contribution to a group interest, and to partake of its activities in such ways that social guidance shall be a matter of his own mental attitude, and not a mere authoritative dictation of his acts.

Today student voice is seeing a resurgence of importance as a growing body of literature increasingly identifies student voice as necessary throughout the educational process. Areas where advocates encourage actively acknowledging student voice include curriculum design and instructional methods, educational leadership and general school reform activities, including research and evaluation.

=== Curricular approaches ===
Specific types of activities that can specifically engage student voice include learning by teaching, education decision-making, school planning, participatory action research, learning and teaching evaluations, educational advocacy, and student advisories for principals and superintendents.

==== Service learning ====
Engaging student voice is a primary objective of service learning, which commonly seeks to entwine classroom learning objectives with community service opportunities. Student voice is also present in student government programs, experiential education activities, and other forms of student-centered learning.

=== Student as education decision-makers ===
Engaging students as educational decision-makers is the practice of actively teaching young people responsibility for their education by systematically engaging them in making choices about learning, schooling, and the education system in areas ranging from what affects them personally to what affects an entire student body to what affects the entire school system.

Choosing curricula, calendar year planning, school building design, teacher hiring, and many more issues are often seen as the duties of a school principal or teachers. Today those roles are increasingly seen as avenues for student voice. Students are joining boards of education at all levels, including local, district, and state boards. Some education agencies engage students as staff in programs where they make decisions about grant making, school assessment, and other areas. Students are also participating in decision-making by establishing and enforcing codes of conduct and in personal education decision-making, such as choosing classes and deciding whether to attend school.

== Worldwide examples ==
Education reform has long been the domain of parents, teachers, school administrators and politicians. In some nations, however, there is a growing trend of greater student participation in scholastic affairs.

=== Australia ===
The Connect journal, published in Melbourne, features dozens of examples of student voice throughout education in its bi-monthly publication.

The Victorian Student Representative Council is the umbrella or peak body of students in Victoria, Australia. It is supported with funding from the Victorian Department of Education and Training. The VicSRC is an organisation run by secondary school students, elected by their peers.

The New South Wales Student Representative Council is the peak student leadership consultative and decision-making forum in New South Wales.

=== Canada ===
Including student voice on district school boards was mandated by the Ontario Education Act in 1998. Students in each one of the 72 provincial school boards are represented by a 'pupil representative', commonly called "Student Trustee". They are meant to represent the needs and concerns of students in discussions with the school board administration and the province. The Ontario Student Trustees' Association, OSTA-AECO, has become Ontario's chief student stakeholder, providing professional development to its members and advocates for students' educational interests. The Society for Democratic Education is an organization in Toronto that includes many aspects of heightened student inclusion in education reform policy. The Society for Democratic Education was founded in early 2005 by Bianca Wylie. It has published several essays and position papers that discuss the importance of wide-scale education reform, especially in how it applies to secondary level education and civic education.

Another Canadian organization of note is Learning for a Cause founded in 2004 by educator and poet Michael Ernest Sweet Learning for a Cause which promotes student voices for social change through creative writing and publishing opportunities for Canadian students.

Provincial governments and Ministries of Education across Canada are also getting on board with student engagement and student voice. Alberta Education launched Speak Out – the Alberta Student Engagement Initiative in November 2008 and thousands of students have been sharing their ideas on how to improve how education looks and feels for them.

Ontario's SpeakUp initiative seeks students ideas on what strengthens their engagement in their learning. Ontario's student voice program is centered on four main initiatives, the Minister's Student Advisory Council (MSAC), SpeakUp projects, SpeakUp in a Box and Student Regional Forums.

The Minister’s Student Advisory Council (MSAC) is composed of sixty students, from Grades 7 to 12, they are selected annually to share their ideas and submit recommendations directly to the Ontario Minister of Education. MSAC also determines the themes for Regional Student Forums taking place during the school year. The members of the Minister's Student Advisory Council have been selected in each year since the inaugural year including 2010, 2011, and 2012. SpeakUp projects are micro-grants for students. Student submit applications for projects they have designed that support the goals of the Student Voice initiative, over 1.2 million dollars in grant money is available yearly. Over 5000 SpeakUp projects have been led since 2008. Regional Student Forums are held across the province where students are invited to explore, discuss, and make recommendations about factors that facilitate/hinder their learning. Last, SpeakUp in a box allows students to hold their own forums for 30 people free of charge with the Ontario Ministry of Education providing the materials to do so. More information is available at SpeakUp.

The Calgary Board of Education, in 2010, launched the Chief Superintendent's Student Advisory Council – a group of high school students with student representation from each of the Calgary Board of Education's high school programs. They meet regularly with the Calgary Board of Education's Chief Superintendent, Naomi Johnson, to discuss issues in the system and propose solutions.

Student Voice Initiative is a national movement in Canada to give students a voice in their education. Student Voice Initiative operates on a foundation of support from policy-makers, school administrators, academics, and students from across North America and the world in support of giving students a greater voice in their own education. The core mandate of the organization arose from the success of the 'student trustee' position within the Ontario education community, which has fostered a student leadership framework ranging from student councils at every school, to student senates and student trustees at the regional or district school board level, to the formation of a provincial stakeholder in the Ontario Student Trustees' Association.

=== Chile ===
A powerful example of student voice in school improvement comes from the 2006 student protests in Chile. Throughout the spring of that year, public high school students from across the country began a series of protests, school takeovers, and negotiations designed to bolster support for public education improvement. After seeing the massive effect of the students, government officials met their demands and are working to support ongoing reforms as necessitated by students.

The government's failure at meeting the core student proposals triggered the biggest social protests in Chile since the return of democracy, in 2011.

=== United Kingdom ===
The UK has had a long history of student voice, from Robert Owen's school in New Lanark (allowing the children to direct their learning through questioning, 1816) to Neillie Dick's anarchist school in Whitechapel (set-up by her in 1908 aged 13); A. S. Neill's Summerhill School and Alexander Bloom's St Georges-in-the-East (1945–55). Summerhill School children and staff have been fighting for greater children's rights in schools, running training sessions, presentations and workshops for teachers and children at the House of Commons, London's City Hall, Universities and Schools. They lobbied at the UN Special Session on the Child, spoke at UNESCO and have lobbied the Select Committee on Education. Summerhill School children facilitated the first secondary school children's conference in Dover, involving some 10 schools. Tower Hamlets primary school children have learnt about Summerhill and their legal fight for their children's rights; and regularly work with their local town hall to express their views with the support of HEC Global Learning Centre, including primary conferences.

The most extensive, sustained programme of student voice research in the UK was carried out by the late Professor Jean Rudduck (Faculty of Education, University of Cambridge) and Jean's pioneering work spanned 20 years, helping to establish the principles of student consultation and student participation in practice, policy and research. Jean co-ordinated the ESRC Teaching and Learning Research Programme's Network Project, 'Consulting Pupils about Teaching and Learning' and her work has had a profound influence on the student voice movement, both in the UK and beyond.

StudentVoice is the representative body for secondary students in England. It aims to support students in expressing their views about education by providing workshops and a network of support with other secondary school students. The National College for School Leadership provides career-long learning and development opportunities, professional and practical support for England's existing and aspiring school leaders. Their goal is to ensure that school leaders have the skills, recognition, capacity and ambition to transform the school education system into the best in the world.

The Phoenix Education Trust supports democratic education and helped to found StudentVoice It aims to explore and support education in which children are trusted and respected and their participation in decision-making is encouraged. involver supports schools to develop sustainable structures for effective student voice, school councils and participation, and work with teachers and pupils in primary, secondary and special schools. involver provides training, resources, ongoing support and access to a large UK network of schools.

Some state schools are also pushing student Voice internally and independently across the UK. Schools like Quintin Kynaston Community Academy are now recognised for having one of the largest and most active Student Voice 'faculties' in the country.

=== Ireland ===
In Ireland, the Irish Second-Level Students' Union (ISSU) is the national umbrella body for second-level school Student Councils.

=== United States ===
Many national organizations and media outlets across the United States have addressed student voice recently, including KQED, Edutopia, The Washington Post, and others. They are finding organizations like Student Voice, What Kids Can Do and SoundOut, as well as local efforts happening across the country.

Pushing Boundaries Consulting, LLC is dedicated to ensuring that student voice leads a reform in education through the Let Them Speak! Project including the work of Rebecca Coda, Rick Jetter, and student ambassador Isaiah Sterling.

SoundOut is an international organization that has promoted student voice since it was founded in 2002. In addition to projects across North America and numerous academic citations of their works, SoundOut has also been recognized by UNICEF as "a helpful organization that focuses on promoting student voice in schools." SoundOut's founder, Adam Fletcher, is author of The Guide to Student Voice and the forthcoming Meaningful Student Involvement Handbook. The organization has also published several works related to meaningful student involvement, students on school boards, and student voice.

Student Voice is a nationwide grassroots organization that works to unite and elevate the student voice. Through the use of their @Stu_Voice Twitter page, thousands have come together to speak out using the #StuVoice hashtag during weekly Student Voice chats. Student Voice allows any student to publish blog posts on their website, providing a platform for their voices to be heard. Student Voice hosted the first-ever student voice summit on April 13, 2013, in New York City.

What Kids Can Do shares stories of student voice throughout the educational process, both within the school system and throughout the community. Their highlights emphasize exceptional learning, belonging, and engagement of students in a variety of capacities for a variety of purposes, the greatest of which is in order to promote student voice. WKCD has authored several books about student voice, primarily written by Kathleen Cushman working with high school students, including Fires in the Bathroom: Advice from high schools students for teachers and Sent to the Principal's Office. The High School Survey of Student Engagement works with high schools across the country to capture students' beliefs and experiences, and strengthen student engagement in schools. Their work is used nationally to influence school policy making.

An organization in Minnesota called "Education|Evolving" integrates student voices with current major topics in education policy and maintains an online clearinghouse of student voices on education policy. Their website also has students describing the learning experiences on video. The Quaglia Institute for Student Aspirations promotes student voice as well, teaching schools in Maine how to engage learners in different ways., while UP For Learning in Vermont implements programs across the state to support deep student voice. In Kentucky, the independent youth-led, adult sustained, Kentucky Student Voice Team draws approximately 100 self-selected students from across the state who act as education research, policy, and storytelling partners on both the grassroots and grass-tops levels to promote more just, democratic Kentucky schools and communities.

=== Africa ===
"Your Voice: The Student’s Agenda" (2019) was an experimental 8 to 10-minute journalistic genre-blending news report series produced for Rhodes University's Oppidan Press in South Africa. It was developed, funded and helmed by Banathi Mgqoboka, an award-winning South African multi-platform journalist, writer and media research scholar. In a grassroots campaign style, the communicative ethos of the series aimed to unpack various hard-hitting contemporary sociopolitical issues that affect the communal student experience. Rooted in the principles of Constructive, Engaged and Solutions Journalism practices, the series’ format progressively used a crowd-sourced approach to solicit problem-driven stories from over 7,000 students (via Twitter/X, Facebook and group email lists), whilst applying a solutions journalism approach to news reporting. The series ultimately produced award-winning regional reportage for its pilot episode. Aptly titled Silent Bystanders, the pilot was a social awareness initiative addressing the shortcomings in student policy on the Rhodes University campus by examining the predicament of ‘bystanding’ during occurrences of sexual misconduct towards women students. Crucially, the reportage and discourse of this project prompted Rhodes University’s Student Affairs Office to reassess the directives of its Sexual Offences Policy for Students. The pilot featured contributions from academics in the disciplines of ethics, feminist theory and psychology as well as responses from Rape Crisis Cape Town Trust (NPO), a support and safety organisation dedicated to empowering survivors of rape and other sexual offences.

=== International ===
The Organising Bureau of European School Student Unions (OBESSU) is the body which connects school student unions in secondary education across Europe.

== Outcomes ==
Student voice is increasingly identified as a pillar of successful school reform, as educational researchers, academic institutions, and educational support organizations around the world increasingly advocate for the inclusion of students in the reform process after identifying student voice as a vital element of student engagement.

== Criticism ==
Critical educators including bell hooks, Paulo Freire, and Henry Giroux have voiced concern with the singular notion of a student voice. Adam Fletcher, an internationally recognized expert on student voice, has written about this over-simplification, saying that:

It is not enough to simply listen to student voice. Educators have an ethical imperative to do something with students, and that is why meaningful student involvement is vital to school improvement.

This is echoed by other advocates, including Sam Levin. Levin was an eleventh grade student in Massachusetts when he worked with adults at Monument Mountain Regional High School and his peers to establish an independent learning program for high school students. In a 2014 article in The Washington Post, Levin wrote,

Students don't need a voice... The change involves giving something to students, but it's not a voice. Students already have a voice. They have student senates, and student advisory committees. When people talk about student voice, they're talking about feedback sessions and letting students be part of hiring committees. When they say, "Let's give students a voice," they mean, "let's give them a seat at school board meetings." ...Don't give them a voice. Give them our schools.

== See also ==
- Anarchistic free school
- Collaborative learning
- Democratic school
- Educational progressivism
- Experiential learning
- Inquiry education
- Intergenerational equity
- Learning by teaching
- Minimally invasive education
- Personal learning environments
- Project-based learning
- Service learning
- Student activism
- Student engagement
- Student-centered learning
- Teaching for social justice
- Unschool
- Youth voice
- Youth-adult partnerships

=== Local school examples ===
==== United Kingdom ====
- Summerhill School
- Quintin Kynaston School
- St Augustine's School
- Kirkdale School

==== United States ====
- Community High School (Ann Arbor, Michigan)
- The Nova Project (Seattle, Washington)
- Sudbury-style schools
- Coalition of Essential Schools
- Jane Addams School for Democracy
- Goddard College
- The Evergreen State College
- Overseas Family School
- Antioch College

=== Government education examples ===
- Hawaii State Student Council

=== National and international student voice organizations ===
- English Secondary Students' Association
- Organising Bureau of European School Student Unions
