= Disengagement compact =

Agreement between teachers and students

Disengagement compact is the name assigned by educator George Kuh in 1991 to the tacit agreement between college teachers and their students that if teachers will minimize academic demands and grade generously, students for their part will write favorable course reviews and will allow teachers undisturbed time to focus on the research and publishing that their institutions reward with promotions and tenure. Commentators in the United States and Canada attribute the disengagement compact to market forces acting since the 1960s. The disengagement compact has been most discussed — and lamented — by educators convinced that engagement with teachers builds student competence in critical thinking, analytical reasoning, problem solving, and writing. Kuh maintains that the disengagement compact diminishes not only the skills acquisitions closely associated with academic learning but also the students' personal growth that teachers historically had helped to advance by engaging with students outside the classroom as well as inside. Beginning in 2000, educator and author Murray Sperber brought the disengagement compact to the attention of the general reading public, emphasizing its upsurge in large research universities.

== Evidence ==
A 2011 time use study published in The Review of Economics and Statistics found that full-time U.S. college students in 2004, when compared to their 1961 counterparts, spent on average about 10 fewer hours each week in academic study. Both groups of students were taking courses at a rate that would allow them to graduate in four years. The study's authors concluded that "if student effort is a meaningful input to the education production process, then declining time investment may signify declining production of human capital...." Over the same span of years, average college course grades rose significantly. A 2012 study published in Teachers College Record found that although "C" had been the course grade most commonly awarded in U.S. colleges in 1960, now "A" was far and away the most commonly awarded grade. This study's authors wrote, "There is no indication that the rise in grades at public and private schools has been accompanied by an increase in student achievement. If anything, measures indicate that student performance has declined."

A 2018 study of academic reading that surveyed both teachers and students found that although more than three-fourths of surveyed students agreed that "There is a strong relationship between reading proficiently and critical thinking," the students nevertheless "rate instructors negatively if academic reading is explicitly and consistently a part of the course; therefore, faculty do not consistently teach academic reading skills." The study's authors interpreted this finding as a "specific instance of the 'disengagement compact'."

Other scholars have interpreted the combination of fewer reading assignments, reduced study time, and higher grades as evidence for the disengagement compact. Academically Adrift authors Richard Arum and Josipa Roksa cite the compact to explain how "students are able to receive high marks and make steady progress towards their college degrees with such little academic effort." In 2015, educators writing in the British journal Assessment & Evaluation in Higher Education note the Arum and Roksa citation and go on to state that the disengagement compact is an accommodation "that any college instructor we have ever talked to would recognise, if not engage in." One overt execution of the compact got media attention in 2006 when an instructor at Prince Edward Island University, faced with more enrollees in his course than he wished to deal with, offered to award grades of B− to any student willing to disappear while paying the course fee to the university registrar. About 20 of his nearly 100 enrollees accepted the offer.

== Contributing factors ==
The disengagement compact arose and persists through the conjoining of market forces that have altered the incentives and behaviors for college directors and administrators, for students and their parents, and for college teachers. In the 21st century, according to Arum and Roksa, "[U]ndergraduate learning is peripheral to the concerns of the vast majority of those involved with the higher-education system."

=== Directors and administrators ===
With its large financial disbursements to colleges and its direct grants and subsidized loans for individuals, the U.S. Higher Education Act of 1965 significantly altered post-secondary education. In 1960, about 45 percent of recent U.S. high school graduates went on to college. By 2009, the figure had peaked at 70 percent. Addressing a joint session of the U.S. Congress that year, President Barack Obama said that "every American will need to get more than a high school diploma" and promised to "provide the support necessary for you to complete college and meet a new goal: by 2020, America will once again have the highest proportion of college graduates in the world." In contrast to some European nations, which use the years of secondary schooling to sort young people into different channels, only some of which direct to college, the U.S. and Canada have tended to promote college enrollment for everyone.

To absorb enrollees not prepared for traditional post-secondary academic challenges, colleges necessarily changed admissions criteria and institutional practices after 1965. In a businesslike manner, they marketed themselves to a now broader population of applicants who had easy access to government-guaranteed loans. And, having once enrolled these applicants, the colleges then worked to retain them for the total time required for degree completion. This practice applied the business principle that "it is less expensive to keep a customer than to find a new one."

=== Students and parents ===
In 2019 U.S. Federal law enforcement charged more than 50 people in a college admissions bribery scheme. That so many parents would spend tens of thousands of dollars and risk imprisonment for felony crimes testifies to the credential value assigned to acceptance by the selective colleges involved in the scheme. In recent decades, many students and their parents have come to value a college degree more as a credential than for the learning and personal development it might represent. Accordingly, when applying to colleges or when deciding which admission offer to accept, 21st-century students and parents base their college decisions in part on criteria hardly considered before 1965. To enroll and retain students, college administrators have responded to consumer preferences by spending on student activity centers, dining facilities, workout facilities, dormitory enhancements, and lounges. Whereas student support services once focused on academic advising, they now cater to students in many non-academic areas, offering legal services, conflict resolution training, and mental health counseling.

=== Teachers ===
As early as the 1980s, researchers had documented for college faculty the lowered priority assigned to undergraduate teaching and the corresponding raised priorities for research and publishing. Arum and Roksa cite the landmark 1990 study by former U.S. Commissioner of Education Ernest Boyer.

Boyer's Scholarship Reconsidered: Priorities of the Professoriate also found that 25 per cent of four-year college faculty reported that student course evaluations were very important in their institutions' tenure decisions. By the year 2010, 94 per cent of U.S. colleges were formally asking students to submit evaluations of their course experiences. Favorable student evaluations have correlated strongly to high grades and to low course demands.

Colleges have trended over the last half-century to assign undergraduate teaching responsibilities more to non-tenured and adjunct instructors and less to tenured and tenure-track faculty. Those without tenure lack protection against possible negative student course evaluations. One survey of teachers asked, "How has the information obtained from the student evaluation of your classes in itself changed or modified your instructional activities?" Tabulated responses showed that the use of student evaluations as a partial basis for evaluating faculty performance led 22% of surveyed teachers to decrease the amount of material covered in their courses (compared to 7% who increased). The survey authors found that of all changes or modifications in instruction, "most frequently reported was a reduction in coursework demands on students." Reduced coursework demands correlate to student-teacher disengagement.

=== Technology ===
Beginning in the 1990s, colleges on a broad scale initiated for-credit online coursework. According to the National Center for Education Statistics, six million undergraduate students were enrolled in at least one online course during fall 2019, before the onset of the COVID-19 pandemic, a number that nearly doubled in 2020., Numbers in future years are hard to predict. A shift to online instruction has contributed to the disengagement compact, but likely improvements in online technologies and increased teacher familiarization with the tools of online instruction may neutralize the earlier distancing effects.

== Future prospects ==
Market forces that produced the disengagement compact show no signs of abating. A question for the future is whether the disengagement compact threatens the persistence of college as the universally preferred next station for students after high school. George Kuh and a team at Indiana University, convinced that student-teacher engagement translates to improved learning and personal growth during a student's college years, developed in 2000 the National Survey of Student Engagement (NSSE). NSSE has sought to communicate best practices to subscribing institutions. These include innovative strategies to work around the dynamics of the disengagement compact, such as finding ways for students to assist faculty members on faculty research projects. About 600 colleges in the U.S. and Canada participated in NSSE's 2020 survey.

Some colleges have chosen to combat disengagement by de-emphasizing development of cognitive skills, such as critical thinking and analytical reasoning, and substituting promotion of social skills. One such innovation is the awarding of academic credits for leisure education. A study of Clemson University's program found that "students enrolling in leisure education courses tailored to a specific activity are likely to find leisure companions with whom they can pursue the activity beyond the classroom, potentially leading to friendships that may increase students' sense of belonging on campus."

Analysts less invested in maintaining the pre-eminence of colleges have argued for broadening the field of reputable paths that high school graduates can pursue. In his 2018 book The Case against Education: Why the Education System Is a Waste of Time and Money, economist Bryan Caplan argued for destigmatizing vocational education and welcoming new training and apprenticeship initiatives. Caplan's advocacy for more vocational education has earned some acceptance at the highest college levels. Yale now offers college credits to students who complete an online computer training session at the unaccredited Flatiron School.

== See also ==
- Course evaluation
- Distance education
- Grade inflation
