= Center for Community College Student Engagement =

Research and service project

The Center for Community College Student Engagement is a research and service project of the Program in Higher Education Leadership at the College of Education at the University of Texas at Austin.

The Center was founded in 2001 under the name Community College Survey of Student Engagement (CCSSE). Major grants from the Houston Endowment Inc., the Lumina Foundation for Education, the MetLife Foundation, the James Irvine Foundation, and The Pew Charitable Trusts have supported the Center's work.

In August 2008, the Center moved off the UT main campus to accommodate growing operational needs. In conjunction with this move and in recognition of its broadening portfolio of services, CCSSE was renamed the Center for Community College Student Engagement.

== Research ==
The Center for Community College Student Engagement administers the following national surveys annually:

- The Community College Survey of Student Engagement (CCSSE), conducted throughout the spring academic term.
- The Faculty Survey of Student Engagement (CCFSSE), a companion survey to the original student survey, conducted throughout the spring academic term.
- The Survey of Entering Student Engagement (SENSE), conducted in the fourth and fifth weeks of the fall academic term.

The Center publicly reports survey results online at www.ccsse.org and www.enteringstudent.org stating, "This commitment [to public reporting] is critical because the Center aims to be a reliable source of information, a catalyst for open discussion of quality and performance in community colleges, and a tool that community colleges can use both for public accountability and to improve their practices...Because our data are public, we ask that the information be used responsibly." The Center has a formal policy statement on the responsible uses of CCSSE data."

The Center also conducts qualitative research including interviews and focus groups through its Starting Right Initiative.

In 2006, the Center completed a validation research study that established the relationship between student engagement and a variety of student outcomes in community colleges, including academic performance, persistence, and attainment. While previous research demonstrated a relationship between student engagement and positive student outcomes, and also provided examples of effective educational practices, the majority of such research was conducted within four-year institutions. For instance, of approximately 2,600 studies reviewed for How College Affects Students, no more than 5% of the studies focused on community college students. An examination of approximately 2,300 articles published in five major higher education journals between 1990 and 2003 found that only 8% mentioned community colleges. Since substantial differences exist between two-year and four-year institutions' missions, populations, and environmental characteristics, the Center's validation study was a notable contribution to the field.

== Membership ==
The community and technical colleges become Center members by paying to participate in one or more of the Center's national survey research projects. There are 1,173 community and technical colleges in the United States. The Center's membership includes more than 730 community and technical colleges from 49 states, as well as a few colleges in Alberta, British Columbia, Bermuda, Marshall Islands, Northern Marianas, Nova Scotia, Ontario, and Quebec.

== See also ==
- CCSSE
- Education
- Student engagement
- Undergraduate education
