= Learning cell =

A learning cell is a learning strategy for a pair of students to learn together. It is an active learning style. A learning cell is a process of learning where two students alternate asking and answering questions on commonly read materials.

== History ==
The Learning Cell was developed by Marcel Goldschmid of the Swiss Federal Institute of Technology in Lausanne in 1971. Learning Cells were proposed to address certain demands of ubiquitous learning for learning resources to be generative, evolving, intelligent, and adaptive.

== Concept ==
The meaning of Cell

- Component: Learning cells can compose higher-level learning resources
- Origin: learning cells grow from small to big, from weak to strong
- Nerve cell: unite to get intelligence

== The procedure ==
Firstly, an assignment is chosen which needs to be prepared by the students, the students will read the assignment and write down the questions that they have about the reading. At the next meeting, the teacher will randomly put the students in pairs. The process begins by designating one student from each pair to begin by asking one of their questions to the other. Once the two students discuss the question, the teacher moves from pair to pair to give feedback and answer questions. This process consists of two elements or parts, two students, so it is also called Dyad.

== Features ==
The features of learning cell are:

- Learning Cell integrates content, activities and practices and builds up a larger knowledge network.
- Learning Cell is open structured and can communicate with other applications and share information.
- Elements of Learning cell includes current version information, editing process description(e.g.: notes or revisions) and past versions.
- It includes not just content learning but also learning cognitive wisdom.

== Learning patterns ==
The different ways of using this technique are by reading/listening/watching, doing/acting, connecting, re-organizing, comparing, reflection, communicating, teaching, creating.

== Advantages ==
Under Learning Cell, there are a number of advantages, which include:

- Learning can be done space dimension. In the process of learning cell, learning is done in pairs or in groups it can be done anywhere.
- Learning can be done in time dimension. There is time limit for this type of learning. Students who are paired can discuss and draw their conclusions and share it with others in their time. But it has to be monitored.
- Accepts content from different types of learners and of different level of learners and integrates it.
- Learning cell can be adapted in informal learning environment also.
- Learning supports u-learning.

== U-Learning ==
The learning cell was developed from the learning object model and designed for u-learning. The basic idea is to introduce time dimension and interpersonal cognition network into learning resources to make the learning resolvable. During the process, information and the revision history are recorded, an interpersonal network is created, and a connection between the human and knowledge is established to form a knowledge network.

== See also ==
- Active learning
- Dyad pedagogy
