= George D. Kuh =

- Born: 1946 (age 79–80)
- Citizenship: American
- Employer: Indiana University Bloomington
- Known for: Student engagement, High-impact educational practices, National Survey of Student Engagement
- Title: Chancellor's Professor Emeritus

Academic background
- Education: Luther College (BA); St. Cloud State College (MS); University of Iowa (PhD)

George D. Kuh (born c. 1946) is an American scholar in higher education and Chancellor's Professor Emeritus at Indiana University Bloomington. He is known for his foundational work on student engagement, high-impact educational practices, and undergraduate student success. He founded and directed the National Survey of Student Engagement (NSSE) and related instruments, and co-founded the National Institute for Learning Outcomes Assessment (NILOA).

== Early life and education ==
Kuh received a Bachelor of Arts degree from Luther College in Iowa in 1968, with majors in English and history. He went on to earn a Master of Science degree in School Counseling from St. Cloud State College in 1971, followed by a Doctor of Philosophy in Counselor Education, with a minor in Higher Education, from the University of Iowa in 1975.

== Academic career ==
Kuh began his academic career at the University of Iowa from 1975 to 1976, serving as an assistant professor in Student Development and Counselor Education and as assistant director of the Drug Counseling Program. He joined Indiana University Bloomington in 1976 as an assistant professor in Higher Education and College Student Personnel, was promoted to associate professor in 1979, and attained the rank of full Professor in 1984.

In 1999 he founded the Center for Postsecondary Research, and served as the director until 2010, and in 2001 he was named a Chancellor's Professor. Upon his retirement in 2010, he was conferred the title of Chancellor's Professor Emeritus.

Kuh has served as the founding Director of the National Survey of Student Engagement from 1999 to 2007, and as Director of the NSSE Institute for Effective Educational Practice from 2002 to 2007. He also served as Director of the College Student Experiences Questionnaire Program from 1994 to 2008, Director of the Law School Survey of Student Engagement from 2003 to 2010, and co-director of the Strategic National Arts Alumni Project from 2008 to 2012.

== Research ==
Kuh has authored more than 400 publications. His research has focused on student engagement, higher education assessment, and undergraduate learning outcomes. Building on earlier work by Alexander Astin and C. Robert Pace, Kuh contributed to the development of student engagement as a framework for assessing educational quality through the National Survey of Student Engagement (NSSE).

From 2002 to 2004, Kuh directed the DEEP (Documenting Effective Educational Practice) project, which studied colleges and universities with strong student success outcomes. The project informed the 2005 book Student Success in College: Creating Conditions That Matter, which identified institutional practices associated with student learning and retention.

== Selected publications ==
=== Books ===
- Kuh, G. D., Kinzie, J., Schuh, J. H., Whitt, E. J., & Associates. (2005/2010). Student success in college: Creating conditions that matter. San Francisco: Jossey-Bass.
- Kuh, G. D. (2008). High-impact educational practices: What they are, who has access to them, and why they matter. Washington, DC: Association of American Colleges and Universities.
- Kuh, G. D., Ikenberry, S. O., Jankowski, N., Cain, T. R., Ewell, P. T., Hutchings, P., & Kinzie, J. (2015). Using evidence of student learning to improve higher education. San Francisco: Jossey-Bass.
- Kuh, G. D., Kinzie, J., Buckley, J. A., Bridges, B. K., & Hayek, J. C. (2007). Piecing together the student success puzzle: Research, propositions, and recommendations. ASHE Higher Education Report, 32(5). San Francisco: Jossey-Bass.
- Kuh, G. D., & Whitt, E. J. (1988). The invisible tapestry: Culture in American colleges and universities. ASHE-ERIC Higher Education Report, No. 1. Washington, DC: Association for the Study of Higher Education.
- Kuh, G. D., Schuh, J. H., Whitt, E. J., & Associates. (1991). Involving colleges: Successful approaches to fostering student learning and personal development outside the classroom. San Francisco: Jossey-Bass.

=== Selected journal articles ===
- Kuh, G. D., Cruce, T. M., Shoup, R., Kinzie, J., & Gonyea, R. M. (2008). Unmasking the effects of student engagement on college grades and persistence. Journal of Higher Education, 79, 540–563.
- Carini, R. M., Kuh, G. D., & Klein, S. P. (2006). Student engagement and student learning: Testing the linkages. Research in Higher Education, 47, 1–32.
- Kuh, G. D. (1995). The other curriculum: Out-of-class experiences associated with student learning and personal development. Journal of Higher Education, 66, 123–155.
- Kuh, G. D., & Gonyea, R. M. (2003). The role of the academic library in promoting student engagement in learning. College and Research Libraries, 64, 256–282.
- Zhao, C-M., & Kuh, G. D. (2004). Adding value: Learning communities and student engagement. Research in Higher Education, 45, 115–138.

== Awards and honors ==
- Trudy W. Banta Lifetime Achievement in Assessment Award, IUPUI (2018)
- Howard Bowen Distinguished Career Award, Association for the Study of Higher Education (2015)
- President's Medal for Academic Excellence, Indiana University (2014)
- Distinguished Fellow, National Society for Experiential Education (2014)
- Robert Zemsky Medal for Innovation in Higher Education, University of Pennsylvania (2013)
- Distinguished Alumni Award, University of Iowa (2012)
- Outstanding Contribution to Higher Education, American College Personnel Association (2010)
- Legacy of the Profession, National Association of Student Personnel Administrators (2010)
- Outstanding Contribution to Higher Education, National Association of Student Personnel Administrators (2008)
- Lifetime Achievement Award, American College Personnel Association (2006)
- Sidney Suslow Award, Association for Institutional Research (2002)
- Tracy Sonneborn Award for Distinguished Teaching and Research, Indiana University (2001)
- Research Achievement Award, Association for the Study of Higher Education (2000)
- Robert H. Shaffer Award for Academic Excellence as a Graduate Faculty Member, National Association of Student Personnel Administrators (1994)
