= Hands On Learning Australia =

Non-profit organisation

Hands On Learning Australia is a not-for-profit organisation listed as a Harm Prevention Charity by the Australian Government. The charity was assisted to come into being by Social Ventures Australia and became an Australian company in 2008 with a board of directors providing governance and oversight. The charity was formed to expand the implementation of a secondary school reengagement program started some nine years previously by high school teacher Russell Kerr, at Frankston high school. The organisation has gained the patronage of Her Excellency Ms Quentin Bryce AC, Governor-General of the Commonwealth of Australia. From 1 April 2017 Hands On Learning Australia merged with Save the Children Australia.

== The Hands On Learning program ==
Hands On Learning (HOL) provides an alternative learning framework for disengaged students to reconnect with school and community. Students come out of normal classes one day per week to join a small team formed of Years 5 to 10 students to work on creative construction projects around their school and in their local community. The students remain part of their normal school program the other four days of the week. Participation is voluntary and long term — students can remain in the program from several weeks to several years, depending upon their needs.

HOL was reviewed by the University of Melbourne and identified as an example of effective strategies for increasing school completion. The program was also considered by Monash University as a way of improving educational outcomes. The program has featured in newspaper and radio broadcasts in Melbourne media, is acknowledged by the Dusseldorp Skills Forum, and endorsed as a strategy to be implemented by schools in the Gippsland region as part of their Youth Commitment to help increase retention rates.

Straw bale hut and pizza oven constructed by HOL students

One of the first projects a HOL program engages in is the construction of a HOL hut. This original straw bale hut continues to operate as the operational centre of HOL at Frankston High School.

=== Principles ===
HOL operates on three broad principles for dealing with students at risk of leaving school prematurely; Target them early and long-term; Work outside the square; Don't just talk, do!. The following summaries are extracted from a presentation given at a Department of Education and Early Childhood Development conference in 2008 unless otherwise indicated.

==== Target them early and long-term ====
HOL involves students in the middle years (Years 5 - 10) as a preventative measure. It operates on the assumption that if students have become fully disengaged they will either exit prematurely, or remain disaffected and derive minimal benefit from their time there. Thus the program attempts to identify and recruit disengaging students before negative attitudes and behaviours become entrenched. Students are reported to remain, on average, two years in the program on a voluntary basis.

==== Work outside the square ====
This phrase refers to the fact that students come out of their normal classes one day per week as a 'release valve' into a small group of students with two adults — a teacher:student ratio of 2:10. These small groups are intended to provide an opportunity for students to form strong relationships and an alternate peer group, providing a sense of belonging.

==== Don't just talk, do! ====
HOL assumes that many of their target cohort of students will feel uncomfortable or stigmatised in seeking out student welfare personnel, or lack either the capacity or disposition to explore their issues verbally. In giving these students practical, inherently purposeful tasks to take part in, it is believed that they will be able to form supportive relationships that will help build a sense of wellbeing without necessarily engaging in discussion about issues they may be facing.

=== Community projects ===
The HOL program has been involved in numerous community based projects since its inception. Examples include the construction of board walks, foot bridges, renovation of community buildings, repairs to public park infrastructure etc.

=== HOL LiNK ===
In 2008 the HOL model was used as the basis for a pilot Literacy and Numeracy Knowledge program called HOL LiNK. The HOL LiNK program was an extension to an existing HOL program at Carrum Downs Secondary College. Somewhat unusually, the HOL LiNK program was expressly implemented as a non-remedial setting, working instead to help students avail themselves of incidental learning opportunities and to improve their strategies for coping in traditional classrooms.

=== HOL SaFE ===
In 2009 Hands On Learning Australia entered into a pilot partnership with Berry Street and Anglicare Victoria to form a School and Family Engagement project (HOL SaFE) at two Victorian Government Secondary Colleges. The HOL SaFE project consisted of bringing a Youth & Family Worker from the partnering agency into a HOL program within a school. By working directly with disadvantaged students within the context of HOL, the Youth & Family Worker could form much stronger relationships over a longer period of time, thereby enhancing their capacity to engage and work with the students' families.

=== HOLmes ===
A third extension to the basic Hands On Learning program was piloted in 2009 utilising Medicare funding to enable a psychologist or social worker to join the HOL team to provide mental and emotional support (hence HOLmes) to those disaffected students who were eligible for a Mental Health Plan.

== See also ==
- Student engagement
- Hands on learning
