= Community College Survey of Student Engagement =

Survey of student engagement at community and technical colleges

The Community College Survey of Student Engagement (CCSSE) is a survey of students at community colleges and technical colleges that examines their experiences with learning, academic work, faculty and peers, and college support services. It was established in 2001 at the University of Texas at Austin as a counterpart to the National Survey of Student Engagement (NSSE), which was developed primarily for four-year institutions. The survey is administered by the Center for Community College Student Engagement (CCCSE), part of the Department of Educational Leadership and Policy at the University of Texas at Austin. Researchers have used CCSSE data to study student engagement and its relationship with academic outcomes, while a number of studies have also examined the validity and structure of the survey's engagement measures.

== History ==
CCSSE was established in 2001 with startup support from The Pew Charitable Trusts and the Lumina Foundation. Twelve colleges took part in a pilot administration that fall, followed by a field test involving 48 colleges in spring 2002. Its first national administration took place in 2003.

The survey underwent several revisions during its first years, with a version used from 2005 through 2016. A broader review began in 2014 and drew on earlier CCSSE data, feedback from participating colleges, and cognitive interviews with community college students. The revised survey was introduced for the spring 2017 administration. CCCSE currently lists separate survey instruments for 2017-2023 and 2024 onward, as well as earlier versions dating back to 2001.

== Survey and administration ==
CCSSE asks students about their coursework, interactions with instructors and other students, use of academic and student services, educational planning, and responsibilities outside college.

It is administered during the spring academic term. Participating colleges may administer a paper survey in randomly selected credit courses, conduct an online survey in selected in-person courses, or distribute an online version more broadly to eligible students.

The sampling method can affect which students are represented in the results. In classroom-based sampling, full-time students have a greater chance of being selected because they take more classes. CCCSE also reports that full-time students and women are more likely to respond to its online surveys. To account for these differences, current institutional reporting uses post-stratification weights based on enrollment status and gender identity. Before the 2022 reporting cycle, weighting was based only on enrollment status.

CCSSE groups a number of survey items into five benchmarks: active and collaborative learning, student effort, academic challenge, student-faculty interaction, and support for learners. The benchmarks are intended to allow participating institutions to examine patterns in their results and make comparisons with other participating colleges.

== Research and validity ==
The reliability and validity of CCSSE measures have been examined in several studies. C. Nathan Marti analyzed the Community College Student Report, the instrument used by CCSSE, using confirmatory factor analysis and other tests of reliability and validity. The study found reasonable internal and test–retest reliability and a consistent positive association between latent engagement measures and students' grade point averages.

Other researchers have cautioned against assuming that the survey performs identically in every setting. In 2009, Lance R. Angell examined CCSSE at one community college in the southeastern United States and emphasized the importance of establishing local validity when benchmark measures are used for institutional decision-making.

A 2010 study commissioned by the Higher Education Quality Council of Ontario examined CCSSE results at Humber College. After controlling for factors including age, sex, and previous academic performance, the researchers found that two of the five benchmarks, active and collaborative learning and academic challenge, consistently predicted GPA and the number of courses completed. The other benchmarks showed weaker or no comparable relationships with the academic outcomes examined.

Amaury Nora, Gloria Crisp, and Cissy Matthews subsequently examined the dimensionality of student engagement measured by CCSSE and the predictive validity of its five benchmarks. Their 2011 study proposed a different theoretical framework that placed greater emphasis on behavioral and attitudinal aspects of student engagement.

In 2020, Kyle McCarrell and Benjamin Selznick tested an alternative model based on seven principles of undergraduate education. Using CCSSE responses from 1,076 students at two community colleges, their confirmatory factor analysis supported a seven-factor model with high model fit and moderate-to-strong factor reliability.

The benchmarks have also been tested with particular student populations. A 2021 study of international students found that the original CCSSE benchmark structure was a poor fit for that population and that the alternative constructs produced by the analysis had poor reliability. The researchers recommended including culturally relevant variables and qualitative information when examining the engagement of international students.

A validation study published in 2025 examined the 2017 version of CCSSE using its 2019 three-year cohort. Yi Wang, E. Michael Bohlig, and Sandra L. Dika identified eight engagement factors underlying 42 survey items. Twenty-eight of the 38 items contained in the traditional benchmarks were retained within the new factors. The authors argued that the resulting structure provided a more appropriate psychometric approach to measuring engagement than treating the five benchmarks themselves as latent constructs.

A related 2025 study linked CCSSE responses from 1,227 students at three North Carolina community colleges with institutional academic records. Five of eight engagement factors were significantly associated with concurrent academic outcomes, while three were associated with later outcomes such as persistence, credential completion, or transfer. Interaction with faculty and peers was positively associated with every outcome examined except transfer.

== Use in research ==
CCSSE data have also been used to examine differences in how community college students engage with their institutions. A 2011 study by Victor Sáenz and colleagues pooled responses from more than 320,000 students at 663 community colleges and used cluster analysis to identify different patterns of engagement. The study found that use of student support services was the strongest feature distinguishing the resulting groups.

== See also ==
- Undergraduate education
