= High School Survey of Student Engagement =

The High School Survey of Student Engagement (HSSSE) is a survey designed to investigate student engagement: the attitudes, perceptions, and beliefs of high school students about their work. The survey was the central component of a research and professional development project directed by the Center for Evaluation & Education Policy (CEEP) at Indiana University. The primary purpose of the project is to help high schools explore, understand, and strengthen student engagement.

Since 2003, HSSSE has been used to measure the engagement of secondary students, with more than 400,000 students in over 40 states completing the survey between 2006 and 2013.

As of 2013, CEEP no longer administers HSSSE as a fee-for-service. The use of HSSSE survey items by schools, districts, and researchers is now permitted without charge. The Center for Evaluation and Education Policy (CEEP) and HSSSE must be cited/referenced in documentation and publications.

Past reports include the following:

- Indiana University. High School Survey of Student Engagement 2005: What We Can Learn from High School Students. Bloomington, Ind: Indiana University, 2005.
- Yazzi-Mintz, E. 2006. "Voices of Students on Engagement: A Report on the 2006 High School Survey of Student Engagement". Bloomington, Ind.: Indiana University Press.
- "Engaging the Voices of Students: A Report on the 2007 & 2008 High School Survey of Student Engagement" and "Voices of Students on Engagement: A Report on the 2006 High School Survey of Student Engagement".
- "Charting the Path from Engagement to Achievement: A Report on the 2009 High School Survey of Student Engagement", June 8, 2010, including profiles of schools and districts that are making effective use of HSSSE data.

== See also ==
- Community College Survey of Student Engagement
- National Survey of Student Engagement
- Student engagement
