= Murray Sperber =

American writer

Murray A. Sperber (born November 30, 1940) taught at Indiana University, Bloomington, from 1971 to 2004 and is a Professor Emeritus of English and American Studies at the school. He subsequently taught (2008–2017) in the Cultural Studies of Sport in Education program in the Graduate School of Education at the University of California, Berkeley.

At Indiana, he published seven books and many articles and reviews. His books have won various awards: Sports Illustrated placed Beer & Circus on its list of "100 Best Sports Books of All-time" (December 16, 2002) and Frank DeFord named Shake Down the Thunder as the second best sports history book (December 16, 2002).

Sperber was the first chair of the Drake Group, a national faculty committee advocating reform of college sports and he later received its Robert M. Hutchins Award. In conjunction with his work on college sports he appeared on many national TV and radio programs, including CBS-TV's 60 Minutes, NPR's Morning Edition, All Things Considered, and Talk of the Nation, and PBS-TV's Newshour. He also contributed op-ed pieces to The Chronicle of Higher Education, Inside Higher Education, and other periodicals, including The New York Times.

Sperber was born in Montreal, Quebec, Canada. He received his B.A. from Purdue University in 1961, and both his M.A. (1963), and PhD (1974) from the University of California, Berkeley.

Sperber was involved in the events in 2000 surrounding the firing of Indiana University men's basketball coach, Bob Knight. Sperber criticized the university's handling of the situation and incurred the wrath of many of Knight's fans. As a result, he had to take a leave-of-absence from the university. He later returned but, in 2004, retired from Indiana University, and left the state of Indiana.

== Works ==
External videos
- Booknotes interview with Sperber on Beer and Circus: Big-Time College Sports, November 26, 2000, C-SPAN

- Beer & Circus: How Big-Time College Sports is Crippling Undergraduate Education (Henry Holt & Co. 2000).
- Onward to Victory: The Crises That Shaped College Sports (Henry Holt & Co, 1998).
- Shake Down the Thunder: The Creation of Notre Dame Football (Henry Holt & Co, 2002)
- College Sports Inc.: The Athletic Department vs. the University (Henry Holt & Co, 1991).
- Literature & Politics: (Hayden Humanities Series), (Hayden and Co., 1978).
- Arthur Koestler: A Collection of Critical Essays, The Twentieth Century Views Series, (Prentice-Hall Inc., 1977).
- And I Remember Spain: A Spanish Civil War Anthology (Macmillan and Co., New York, 1974).
