= Dyad pedagogy =

Dyad pedagogy is a goal-directed teaching method. Students are randomly assigned into dyads and work together on inquiry-type problems. The educational method was developed by Dr. Lloyd Sherman, a professor at the Mount Sinai School of Medicine in New York City during the 1990s.

== See also ==
- Chavruta
