= New South Wales Student Representative Council =

The NSW SRC Official Logo

The New South Wales Student Representative Council (NSW SRC) is a body that aims to represent the views of secondary students in the Australian state of New South Wales. It is cited by the Department of Education and Communities as its "peak student leadership consultative and decision-making forum".

The NSW SRC consists of twenty-two members, including two Aboriginal student leaders, whose goals are to promote public education and improve the quality of school life for all students. The Council meets five times a year, and distributes minutes summaries from each term's meeting to all government secondary school SRCs. It works on the recommendations passed by the student forum at the NSW State SRC Conference, and is consulted on student issues by senior officials from the Department of Education and Communities and other government departments, and also by businesses and community groups.

Students are elected to the Council at regional meetings held after the annual state conference. Two student leaders are elected from each region of New South Wales.
