= Gallery walk =

Gallery walks are an educational activity where students learn about a topic by seeing the projects completed by other students at the end of a project or laboratory. They are a fun way of showing creativity in class and showing it off to peers. Gallery walks also mean that a student gets to create an artwork or science project based their own topic. The students in groups move through different stations where a question is posted for them to answer and interact and share knowledge in the process. Gallery walks also include being creative and showing your hard work inside and outside of the classroom.

== Steps involved ==
- The students of a class are divided into small groups by the teacher.
- The teacher posts different open-ended questions in the form of texts or images, related to a particular context/ topic, one each in a chart paper and is fixed on the classroom walls, as in an Art Gallery. The questions are thus placed at different stations in the classroom. The questions can be framed in such a manner as to challenge the critical thinking of the students and each question is placed on the walls as to have sufficient distance between them. This arrangement helps the students to walk around from one place to another to view the questions.
- Each student group is assigned to one question in the beginning of the activity and the students in the group can discuss and write their thoughts or facts or the solution to the question.
- After a short, fixed period of time, the group moves to the next question. They can read and criticize the reflections of the previous group who answered that question or they can provide their own thoughts. The students write their thoughts below the contributions by the previous group who answered that question. This continues till the last question.
- The teacher meanwhile observes the student participation in the activity and also give inputs to the students. The teacher can move around in the class interacting with different student groups. This activity can also be used by the teacher for formative assessment of the students.
- When after walking in the classroom contributing to the solution of all questions, the groups return to the first question they faced. They will be able to view and synthesize the comments of all the groups and this activity ends when each group gives an oral presentation. The entire class can participate in the discussion and any misconceptions can be removed.

== Advantages ==
- Students interact and synthesize the concepts, making learning more effective than in a typical classroom environment. Higher order thinking skills are involved.
- Students are encouraged to move around without having to sit in one place for a long time, removing boredom which otherwise makes learning uninteresting.
- Students get to know about different perspectives of the same topic, thus improving the learning opportunities.
- Students encouraged to use the apt language and terminologies of the subject, improving their knowledge on the discipline.
- Improves public-speaking skills, particularly of reserved students who otherwise do not get a chance to speak to an audience.
- Develops team-building and listening skills among students.
- Can be extended by asking the students to work on an assignment for the same or related topic, based on the knowledge constructed during the activity and evaluating the work.
- Can be used to understand the previous knowledge of the students.

== Disadvantages ==
Some of the limitations of this method are the following.

- A few students in the group may not actively participate in the knowledge construction. This can be addressed up to a certain extent by assigning specific roles to students in each group and then asking them to rotate the roles when they reach the next station. The teacher can also ask some evaluative questions to the students during the activity in order to bring them back to the activity.
- Some students prefer to learn individually and hence may not participate in discussions. For these learners, the teacher can mention the benefits of teamwork and how it can be helpful for them in the future.
- The evaluation may not be just. This issue can be addressed by the teachers by having an evaluation rubrics in advance and making the students familiar with it.
