= Student engagement =

Analysis

Student engagement occurs when "students make a psychological investment in learning. They try hard to learn what school offers. They take pride not simply in earning the formal indicators of success (grades and qualifications), but in understanding the material and incorporating or internalizing it in their lives."

Since the U.S. college dropout rate for first-time-in college degree-seeking students is nearly 50%, it is increasingly seen as an indicator of successful classroom instruction, and as a valued outcome of school reform. The phrase was identified in 1996 as "the latest buzzword in education circles." Students are engaged when they are involved in their work, persist despite challenges and obstacles, and take visible delight in accomplishing their work. Student engagement also refers to a "student's willingness, need, desire and compulsion to participate in, and be successful in, the learning process promoting higher level thinking for enduring understanding." Student engagement is also a usefully ambiguous term for the complexity of 'engagement' beyond the fragmented domains of cognition, behaviour, emotion or affect, and in doing so encompass the historically situated individual within their contextual variables (such as personal and familial circumstances) that at every moment influence how engaged an individual (or group) is in their learning.

== Definitions ==
Student engagement is frequently used to, "depict students' willingness to participate in routine school activities, such as attending class, submitting required work, and following teachers' directions in class." However, the term is also increasingly used to describe meaningful student involvement throughout the learning environment, including students participating in curriculum design, classroom management and school building climate. It is also often used to refer as much to student involvement in extra-curricular activities in the campus life of a school/college/university which are thought to have educational benefits as it is to student focus on their curricular studies.

In a number of studies student engagement has been identified as a desirable trait in schools; however, there is little consensus among students and educators as to how to define it. Often, student engagement is defined according to one of the most popular measures of student engagement – the National Survey of Student Engagement (NSSE). Other studies have shown that student engagement overlaps with, but is not the same as, student motivation. Because of the lack of consensus on what student engagement is (and what it is not), researchers have begun to offer suggestions for moving the educational literature towards a unified conceptualization of student engagement. These researchers generally adopt a combination of psychological and socio-cultural perspectives to represent student engagement as three dimensions including affect, behavior, and cognition. Using these perspectives, some researchers have further borrowed from work psychology research to suggest that the 'engaged' part of student engagement means that student harness themselves to their role, and thus show a high level of activation or energy.

Student engagement is used to discuss students' attitudes towards school, while student disengagement identifies withdrawing from school in any significant way.

== Requirements ==
Student engagement requires that teachers actively seek to create the conditions that foster this reaction. The first step to whole-school improvement in the area of student engagement is for the entire building faculty to share a definition of student engagement. Other steps include clear articulation of learning criteria with clear, immediate, and constructive feedback; show students the skills they need to be successful are within their grasp by clearly and systematically demonstrating these skills, and; demonstrate engagement in learning as a valuable aspect of their personalities.

Relationships between students and adults in schools, and among students themselves, are a critical factor of student engagement. This is especially true among students considered to be at-risk and without other positive adult interaction. There are several strategies for developing these relationships, including acknowledging student voice, increasing intergenerational equity and sustaining youth-adult partnerships throughout the learning environment. There have been multiple formats identified for this type of engagement.

The National Survey of Student Engagement identifies dozens of everyday indicators of student engagement throughout colleges and universities.

== Indicators ==
The term "student engagement" has been used to depict students' willingness to participate in routine school activities, such as attending classes, submitting required work, and following teachers' directions in class. That includes participating in the activities offered as part of the school program and student participation in school reform activities. Engaged students show sustained behavioral involvement in learning activities accompanied by a positive emotional tone. They select tasks at the border of their competencies, initiate action when given the opportunity, and exert intense effort and concentration in the implementation of learning tasks; they show generally positive emotions during ongoing action, including enthusiasm, optimism, curiosity, and interest.

Another study identified five indicators for student engagement in college. They included the level of academic challenge, active and collaborative learning, student-faculty interaction, enriching education experiences and a supportive learning environment. Indicators of the absence of student engagement include unexcused absences from classes, cheating on tests, and damaging school property.

Engagement is more than what students listen and do. A high level of engagement results in better learning, and the learner will be emotionally connected, feel satisfied with the course and the institution. proposes a frame work in terms of Emotional, Behavioral & Cognitive. highlighted that the engagement is related with the Mastery of academic work. described the process of student engagement. The author stated that the student engagement stimulates the curiosity.;; identified four dimensions including academic, Affective, Behavioral, & Cognitive

The opposite of engagement is disaffection. Disaffected students are passive, do not try hard, and give up easily in the face of challenges... [they can] be bored, depressed, anxious, or even angry about their presence in the classroom; they can be withdrawn from learning opportunities or even rebellious towards teachers and classmates.

== Factors influencing student engagement ==
Many factors contribute to a student's engagement at school, ranging from the student's internal experiences to the student's interactions with their environment. Research by Fletcher identifies eight different ways student engagement is affected through these internal and external factors, including manipulation and equity.

=== Internal factors ===
Studies have concluded that there are three main factors that contribute to the student's internal process of engaging, the first of which is behavioral engagement. Behavioral engagement defines how the student appears to be engaging with learning, such as participating and persevering. The second internal factor is cognitive engagement, which concerns the student's mental processes of paying attention and pushing themselves past their expectations. The last factor deals with the student's positive or negative experience of learning, and is called emotional-affective engagement. These internal engagement factors are not stable, and can shift over time or change as the student moves in and out of the school environment, classroom environment, and different learning tasks.

=== External factors ===
There are a vast amount of external factors that influence a child's experience with engaging in learning, such as the family, school, peers, sociocultural factors, and environmental stressors.

==== Family ====
Family shapes a child's experience with learning and engaging through the home environment such as family values, and the family's access to opportunities. Parenting styles and the parents’ expectations for the child's success influence how much parents are involved with their child's learning, which studies have shown to be positively connected to student engagement. A family's income also has an effect on a child's engagement, because families with a higher socioeconomic status (SES) have been shown to expose their children to more intellectually enriching activities and know how to intervene in the school system to promote their child's education. A family's literacy may also affect a child's engagement; students such as immigrant or bilingual students may not have families that are literate in the language of the classroom. This language disconnect makes it especially difficult for these families to be involved in their child's education, as they may struggle to communicate with the child's teacher and form connections. Literacy resources and translators will help to make these connections between school and family for these students and aid in their engagement. Additionally, a school's engagement with its community brings a better understanding of the community values, implementing these values in the school environment will lead to more family involvement and therefore, student engagement.

==== Peers ====
Peers have a strong influence on adolescent engagement, with research showing that adolescents will match their engagement level to that of their peer group, and conversely choose a peer group that matches their own engagement level. During this time, peers are an important part of a student's self-identity, with a strong connection to a peer group relating to higher levels of engagement. Peers also influence younger children as they learn to navigate how to socialize and socially conform.

==== Sociocultural factors ====
A student's social identity (i.e. race-ethnicity and social class) contributes heavily to a child's engagement. Social positions influence access to resources and opportunities, exposure to stressors, and parental investment. It is vital to consider sociocultural factors when observing the engagement behavior of youths of color, because they experience intergenerational oppression, discrimination, and socioeconomic inequality.

==== Environmental stressors ====
Environmental stressors, predicted by both race-ethnicity and SES, play a large role in student engagement. Children from poor or low socioeconomic households may experience a disruption in family functioning due to economic hardships and financial strains, and children from low SES neighborhoods and communities of color (specifically black, Native American, and Latino) experience more stressors due to their surroundings. Neighborhoods closely mirror the resources given to the schools in the area, and schools in low SES areas are underfunded and lack supplies, leading to an inequality gap in the education these children receive.

Environmental stressors also include the prejudice, racism, and discrimination a student of color is subject to. A child's race determines the stereotypes they will face in and out of school, and research has shown that perceptions of discrimination and stereotype threat play a large role in the development of engagement amongst children of color.

==== Intersection of external factors ====
The factors mentioned above do not occur in isolation to one another - they are interconnected and shape student engagement. For example, research has shown a connection between school systems and race-ethnicity in that black male students and Latino male students are suspended at a rate far higher than their white male peers. Observing the intersection between the factors (and the privileges and oppression inherent in each factor), help to create a deeper understanding of an individual student's engagement.

== Measuring student engagement ==
Assessing student engagement is seen as an essential step towards a school becoming a successful proponent. Critical educators have raised concerns that definitions and assessments of student engagement are often exclusive to the values represented by dominant groups within the learning environment where the analysis is conducted.

There are several methods to measure student engagement. They include self-reporting, such as surveys, questionnaires, checklists and rating scales. Technologies such as audience response systems, can be used to aid this process. Researchers also use direct observations, work sample analyses, and focused case studies.

In Ireland, student engagement in higher education is measured nationally through StudentSurvey.ie, formerly the Irish Survey of Student Engagement. The taught survey asks first-year undergraduate, final-year undergraduate and taught postgraduate students about their experiences of higher education, while PGR StudentSurvey.ie is aimed at postgraduate research students. StudentSurvey.ie states that approximately 370,000 taught students and 18,000 postgraduate research students have taken part in the surveys.

=== Measuring student engagement in online settings ===
In addition to the traditional methods of collecting data of student engagement such as surveys and questionnaires, using digital footprints of student activities in e-learning environments has recently gained traction. A massive amount of data about student interactions with Learning management system exists in educational databases, so there is an excellent opportunity to use these datasets to understand student engagement in online learning using learning analytics methods.

=== Measuring student engagement among student-athletes ===
Student athletes create one of the dominant groups in most learning environments in the United States of America. Most high schools and universities in the U.S. maintain a large student athlete population. Measuring how and why student athletes at colleges/universities engage with their surrounding academic and professional communities helps educational institutions better understand how they can help student athletes "make the most of the rich academic environment."

==== Measurement through comparison ====
The body of literature concerning college student athletes and how they spend their time has increased in recent years. Many educators and scholars have inquired whether participating in college athletics enhances or detracts from a student athlete's college experience and whether participation in a sport negatively or positively affects other areas of a student-athlete's college life. When analyzing the career of any college student or student athlete, researchers often measure personal development to determine whether the student is happy and having a fulfilling college experience. For a student-athlete, personal development, a necessary ingredient to leading a successful life, includes participation in activities outside the sphere of one's sport and interaction with non-athletes.

==== Student athletes and non-student athletes ====
Many scholars approach research concerning student athletes by comparing student athletes to non-athletes. In studies, such as those presented in the article, "A Comparison of Athletes and Nonathletes at Highly Selective Colleges: Academic Performance and Personal Development", which look at the behavior of students and student athletes, results have shown that student athletes perceive themselves as less intelligent, but more sociable than non-athletes. Surveys asking student athletes about their engagement with other groups on campus have found that the majority of student athletes engages in extracurricular activities and spends more than half of its time interacting with non-athletes. A trend in results developed as well; freshman student athletes proved to be more socially outgoing than senior student-athletes who admitted to spending more time with teammates.

Some literature that attempts to explain student athlete involvement in extracurricular activities looks at factors such as the profile of the sport, the educational, social, economic and cultural background of athletes and characteristics of the institution, which may or may not support and foster student-athletes' involvement in groups and clubs outside of their team. In determining levels of student engagement among college student athletes, methods of comparison between student athletes and non-athletes, females and males, NCAA divisions and revenue generating and non-revenue generating sports have proven helpful. Some researchers believe that differences in how non-athletes and student athletes perceive themselves may determine their level of involvement on college/university campuses. Research has shown that "high-commitment athletes were distinguished from non-athletes by their lower perception of themselves throughout college as smart, intellectual, and artistic/creative, and a higher perception of themselves as socially skilled, outgoing, confident and good leaders." Despite the contrasts in where non-athletes and student athletes believe their strengths lie, "high-commitment athletes were as likely as non-athletes to report every year that they had grown as a person, pursued new activities and interests, gotten to know people from different backgrounds, and found a place at the college/university."

==== Comparisons by gender ====
Many studies have shown that "on average, student athletes are as engaged in most educationally purposeful activities as their peers." However, other comparisons have been made among student athletes in order to better understand which kind of student athlete pursues greater educational engagement. For example, when "compared with male non-athletes, male student athletes are as challenged academically, interact with faculty as frequently, and participate as often in active and collaborative learning activities," however, "female student athletes" when compared to female non-athletes "are more likely to interact with faculty and participate in active and collaborative learning activities." The size of the institution has also been studied as a possible factor in determining a student athlete's engagement. Some researchers argue that "more selective, smaller schools with low student-faculty ratios have higher levels of engagement, as well as schools classified as baccalaureate institutions."

==== Comparisons by division ====
Within the NCAA, colleges and universities are placed in one of three classifications: Division I, Division II and Division III. Research suggests that student athletes from each division differ in their behavior and levels of engagement. For instance, "for both men and women, students at Division III schools report higher levels of academic challenge..." and "interact with faculty more than students at Division I and Division II schools." Such findings have caused some to conclude that student athletes at "small residential liberal arts colleges (most of which are Division III schools)" are more engaged than student athletes in Division I and Division II institutions. Variations in the levels of student-athlete engagement among institutions from different divisions may be explained by stated philosophies of each division. Institutions that compete at the Division III level "offer athletics because of its inherent educational value" and view athletics as an extension of the school's "educational mission." Member institutions of Division II broaden the focus of Division III members and place an equal amount of emphasis on academic, athletic and social success. According to the NCAA Division II Philosophy Statement, "the Division II approach provides growth opportunities through academic achievement, learning in high-level athletics competition and development of positive societal attitudes in service to community." The stated philosophy of Division I institutions places less emphasis on the personal, social and intellectual growth of their student-athletes and states that its "ultimate goal is for student-athletes to graduate" because "a college degree gives student-athletes more options in life."

== Increasing student engagement ==
Several methods have been demonstrated to promote higher levels of student engagement. Instructors can enhance student engagement by encouraging students to become more active participants in their education through setting and achieving goals and by providing collaborative opportunities for educational research, planning, teaching, evaluation, and decision-making. Providing teachers with training on how to promote student autonomy was beneficial in enhancing student engagement by providing students with a more autonomous environment, rather than a controlling environment. Another method of promoting student engagement is through the use of learning communities, a technique that has a group of students taking the same classes together. By being part of a group taking the same classes, students show an increase in academic performance and collaborative skills. Increasing student engagement is especially important at the university level in increasing student persistence. It may also increase students' mastery of challenging material.

In Irish higher education, the National Student Engagement Programme (NStEP) was launched in 2016 by the Higher Education Authority, Quality and Qualifications Ireland and Aontas na Mac Léinn in Éirinn to strengthen student engagement in decision-making. The programme promotes staff–student partnership through training, institutional capacity-building and practice-based projects.

=== Learning communities ===
One method that has been gaining popularity in university teaching is the creation or encouragement of learning communities (Zhao and Kuh 2004). Learning communities are widely recognized as an effective form of student engagement and consist of groups of students that form with the intention of increasing learning through shared experience. Lenning and Ebbers (1999) defined four different types of learning communities: 1. Curricular communities which consist of students co-enrolled in multiple courses in the same field of study. 2. Classroom learning communities that focus on group learning activities in the classroom. 3. Residential learning communities that are formed off-campus that provide out of the classroom learning and discussion opportunities. 4. Student-type learning communities that are created for special groups of students. Within learning communities, students are able to interact with peers who share similar interests and stimulate conversation about the topic. Such conversations are beneficial because they expose the members of the community to new ideas and methods. Students that are a part of such communities are therefore able to generate and construct their knowledge and understanding through inquisitive conversations with peers, as opposed to being given information by the instructor. This type of engagement in the field leads to a deep understanding of the material and gives the student a personal connection to the topic (Zhao and Kuh 2004).

Organizing classrooms into learning communities allows instructors to constantly gather evidence of student learning to inform and improve their professional practice. They use common assessments and make results from those assessments easily accessible and openly shared among members of the team in order to build on individual and team strengths and to identify and address areas of concern. Results are then used to identify students who are experiencing difficulty and need additional time and support for learning as well as students who are highly proficient and require enrichment and extension. Learning community programs also improve students' interpersonal dialogue, collaboration, and experiential learning within the context of diversity, these programs address a decreasing sense of community and connection and allow students to relate their college-level learning to larger personal and global questions.

=== Connected learning ===
The connected learning educational approach is based on evidence that suggests that the most resilient, adaptive, and effective learning involves individual interest as well as social support to overcome adversity and provide recognition. According to research conducted by the Digital Media and Learning Research Hub, connected learning "advocates for broadened access to learning that is socially embedded, interest-driven, and oriented toward educational, economic, or political opportunity." Connected learning environments are learning communities where the walls that separate student learning in and out of school are taken down, opportunities outside of traditional school organizational systems are created, and curricula and instruction is better aligned with student interests.

Connected learning results when a pupil is able to pursue a passion or interest of theirs with the support of peers and caring adults and links their learning and interests to academic achievement, career success, and/or civic engagement. The critical components that encompass connected learning environments include: 1) greater depth and breadth of interests, 2) peer, adult, and institutional learning supports, and 3) greater academic orientation.

The connected learning approach calls for a central focus to include the linking of deep "vertical" expertise with horizontal expertise and creating connections to other cultural domains and practices, and also expects an outcome of the learning approach to be to deepen and expand each student's areas of interests and expertise. A successful connected learning environment can deepen and expand each student's interests, expertise, and knowledge by challenging them to learn and explore content outside of their "islands of expertise," and emphasizing the importance of dialogue and connection practices.

Connected learning environments allow students to be embedded in social networks and communities of different interests and expertise that they can call upon for help, feedback, and mentorship. Connected learning environments are characterized by their "low barriers to entry and a multiplicity of roles, ways of participating, and improving and gaining expertise." The goal of connected learning is to integrate the peer culture, academics, and interests in the way that each individual student is best reached.

=== Displaying work in the community ===
Student engagement represents two critical features of collegiate quality. The first is the amount of time and effort students put into their studies and other educationally purposeful activities. The second is how the institution deploys its resources and organizes the curriculum and other learning opportunities to get students to participate in activities that decades of research studies show are linked to student learning.

=== School climate ===
The J. Erik Jonsson Community School (3 year-old-5th grade) in Dallas, TX has a simple formula for success: "Powerful Pedagogy + trusting relationships = student engagement" (Journal of Staff Development, 2008). The majority of research is done is early education (Pre-School-5th), but this sentiment rings equally true in higher education. Accomplishing that end is nearly impossible in introductory, general education classes with class enrolments reaching up to 300 students at some schools but relationship-building is a skill that is under-appreciated in the "college experience". In Australia many schools offer an integrated program developed by Hands On Learning Australia which provides a type of micro-climate for students experiencing disengagement to develop trusting relationships in the context of practical, construction based, tasks.

== See also ==
- Education theory
- High School Survey of Student Engagement
- Learning community
- National Survey of Student Engagement
- Youth engagement
- Learning analytics
