= Think-pair-share =

Collaborative teaching strategy

Think-pair-share is a collaborative teaching strategy first proposed by Frank Lyman of the University of Maryland in 1987. It can be used to help students form individual ideas, discuss and share with the others in-group. It can be used before reading or teaching a concept and works better with smaller groups. Think-pair-share is often used to build fluency with learners across subject areas, through asking the learners to provide or elaborate on examples and processes.

== Process ==
In think-pair-share strategy the teacher acts as a facilitator, and poses a question or a problem to the students. The students are given sufficient time to think and gather their thoughts, after which the teacher asks them to pair themselves and share their thoughts with each other.

As the students begin to share their thoughts and views, each learns to see the different perspectives of thinking among their peers. By doing so the students' learning is enhanced by the formation and articulation of an idea. This also enables the students to have clarity of thought and have the ability to communicate their thoughts and ideas to another student.

If time permits, the paired students can share their thoughts with other paired students, and teachers can ask one or two pairs to share their ideas with the entire class.

Think-pair-share is designed to help the student to understand the concept of the given topic, develop ability to filter the information and formulate an idea or thought, and draw conclusions. The most important aspect of the think-pair-share is that students will develop the ability to consider and appreciate the different viewpoints of their peers.

== Advantages ==
- The process is easy to prepare and takes only a small amount of time to perform in class.
- The interaction with students at a personal level is intended to motivate those students who may not be generally interested in the topic.
- Different kinds and levels of questions can be asked from lower order to higher order thinking questions.
- Teacher can understand the different thought processes of the students while listening to the pairs and when the students share their view at the end.

== Disadvantages ==
- Building in misconceptions: It has been suggested that one potential drawback of “Think, Pair, Share” arrangements is that students are not guaranteed to hear correct alternatives, and instead hear misconceptions from other students, which in turn simply reaffirms any errors they may have. One potential solution to this disadvantage is to use the Peer Instruction approach which includes a "Think, Pair, Share" element, but requires students to pair with someone with a different opinion from them.
- Lack of engagement: To ensure students are fully engaged in the think, pair, share process rather than discussing unrelated matters, instructors can assign participation grades or include actual exam questions for the think, pair, share element to increase student motivation to engage in the activity.

== See also ==
- Cooperative learning
- Collaborative learning
