= Learning Factory =

Realistic manufacturing environment for education, training, and research

Learning factories represent a realistic manufacturing environment for education, training, and research. In the last few decades, numerous learning factories have been built in academia and industry.

== Definition ==
The term learning factory consists of two words. The word 'learning' indicates the development of competencies, while the word 'factory' defines a realistic manufacturing environment. The generally accepted definition was agreed within the CIRP CWG and published in the CIRP Encyclopedia: According to the International Academy for Production Engineering (CIRP) a learning factory is defined by

- processes that are authentic, include multiple stations, and comprise technical as well as organizational aspects,
- a setting that is changeable resembles a real value chain,
- a physical product being manufactured, and
- a didactical concept that comprises formal, informal and non-formal learning, enabled by own actions of the trainees in an on-site learning approach.

Depending on the purpose of the learning factory, learning takes place through teaching, training and/or research. Consequently, learning outcomes may be competency development and/or innovation. An operating model ensuring the sustained operation of the learning factory is desirable.

The difference between learning factories and model factories is that learning factories provide a didactical concept and an operating model for training.

== History ==
The term 'learning factory' was first coined in the US in 1994, when the National Science Foundation (NSF) awarded a consortium of the Penn State University. Industry-related design projects have been supported on a 2000 m^{2} facility with machines, tools, and materials. Real problems of the industry could be solved in a realistic environment. In 2006, the program received the National Academy of Engineering's Gordon Prize for Innovation in Engineering Education. In Europe, more and more learning factories have been designed in the last decade. One of the first learning factories in this wave is the 'Center for industrial Productivity' founded by the Institute for Production Management, Technology and Machine Tools (Technische Universität Darmstadt), established in 2007 (see section 3). In 2011, the Initiative on 'European Learning Factories' was established with the 1st Conference on Learning Factories in Darmstadt (Germany). The Initiative has led to a European collaboration on the topic of learning factories. In 2017, the initiative decided to include learning factories from all continents and renamed itself to the 'International Association of Learning Factories'.

== Examples of existing learning factories ==
=== Learning factories in academia ===
==== TU Darmstadt: Process Learning Factory CiP ====
In the Process Learning Factory CiP of the Technische Universität Darmstadt focuses on developing competencies for lean production and Industrie 4.0. It has been established in 2007. The delivery of raw material, machining, quality control, assembly, packing, and indirect processes are simulated similar to a small and medium-sized enterprise . Besides the eight variants of the pneumatic cylinder, customer-individualized requirements of different measurements are implemented in a lean machining area. On about 500 m^{2}, learners apply lean methods and solve problems on own experience. The learning factory can map different scenarios from a wasteful and unbalanced production environment to a lean and a digital lean state. The 15 different learning modules are structured in lean basics, lean core elements and lean thinking. Within a learning module, practical experiences alternate with theoretical teaching. The Process Learning Factory CiP is a part of the SME competency center for the Rhine-Main area funded by the German Federal Ministry for Economic Affairs and Energy. With new implemented Industrie 4.0-technologies the concept of lean is extended. Different technologies are implemented, e.g. product traceability, worker assistance, digital shopfloor management, predictive maintenance, milk run 4.0 and AGVs. With each implemented technology new topics for the learning modules are integrated. Furthermore, the operating institute has established many learning factories for academia and industry worldwide.

==== TU Wien: Pilot Factory ====
In the TU Wien Pilot Factory focuses on Industrie 4.0. It is a realistic test environment with real machines, real production chains, and a real product. On 900 m^{2} a 3D printer is produced that uses the principle of fused deposition modeling. The printer dimensions can be configured on customer requirements. Different Industrie 4.0-concepts are integrated, e.g. process and layout adaptivity, a high degree of human-machine interaction, and use of data analytics for transparency and optimization. AGV transportation connects the manufacturing with the assembly area. The material is replenished automatically. Furthermore, operators are assisted with collaborative robots, assistance systems, sensor technology, and image processing.

==== Stellenbosch University: Stellenbosch Learning Factory ====
The Stellenbosch Learning Factory of the Stellenbosch University provides trainings for lean operations, ergonomics and is a research platform for Industrie 4.0. The target groups are industry partners and students for industrial engineering. New developments include a double degree M.Sc. Program with the Reutlingen University. German students have the possibility to visit a summer school. In the learning factory a RFID track and trace-system and a real time KPI visualization are integrated. The product of the Stellenbosch University is a O-scale train set.

==== University of Windsor: iFactory ====
The iFactory of the University of Windsor has the main topics integrated product – systems learning and Industrie 4.0. Desksets and automobile belt tensioners are assembled on 200 sqm. The tracking of processes and production operations planning and scheduling is possible with RFID tags. The complete system is modular and reconfigurable with equipment from FESTO Didactic. The main purpose of the learning factory is research, teaching and demonstration for students and industry. The learning factory was set up in 2011 and is the first of its kind in North America.

==== Université du Luxembourg: Operational Excellence Laboratory ====
The Operational Excellence Laboratory of the Université du Luxembourg is place for industrial partners to get hands-on experience of lean tools and demonstrate new technology related to Industrie 4.0. Examples for new technologies are the integration of RFID, augmented reality and digital manuals. Furthermore engineering master students are trained. The learning factory is a platform for retrofitting new technological features to develop, analyze and validate their usability in assembly or disassembly lines. The product of the learning factory is a hole puncher.

==== Technical University of Munich: Learning Factory for Lean Production (LSP) ====
The focus of the Learning Factory for Lean production (LSP) at the Technical University of Munich is lean production. The manufactured product is a real gearbox with 24 variants. The facility consists of an assembly area, a kaizen workshop area, and a theoretical teaching area. The processes logistics, assembly, quality control and packaging are mapped. A typical lean journey is recreated during the course: from an unsatisfying situation to a lean state. The theory is taught in theory lessons slots. Four to six trainings are offered every year. The mobile equipment can be transported to any location.

==== Ruhr University Bochum: LPS Learning Factory ====
The main topics of the LPS Learning Factory are lean production, Industrie 4.0 and resource efficiency. It was established in 2009 by the Ruhr University Bochum. Bottle caps, bottle cap holders and various make-to-order products are manufactured on 1800 m^{2}. The production environment includes various machine tools, load transports, manual assembly stations, and various industrial robots. The main topics are lean production, Industrie 4.0 and resource efficiency. Every year 900 students are practicing exercises. Real products that are purchased for the industry are produced. Besides that, numerous research projects take place in the learning factory, e.g. Industrie 4.0 maturity model, assistance and learning systems, cyber-physical production systems and industrial robotics. Since 2018 the learning factory is part of the SME 4.0 competence center Siegen.

==== Dresden University of Technology: Process-to-Order Lab (P2O-Lab) ====
The P2O-Lab is a 110 m^{2} learning factory on the premises of the Dresden University of Technology. Building on solution approaches from the fields of modularization, digitization and artificial intelligence, the P2O-Lab investigates the next steps to serve highly variable markets with almost binary product life cycles. The P2O-Lab asks itself which requirements, models, methods, and tools must be fulfilled for this. As an accompanying UserStory, the goal is to derive, evaluate and implement a suitable process from existing plant modules directly from the product order. The findings from the current research are subsequently flowing into the teaching of the Faculty of Electrical Engineering at the TU Dresden. In addition, students as well as external persons have the opportunity to gain hands-on experience in the P2O-Lab in the context of workshops and internships.

=== Learning factories in industry ===
==== MPS Lernplattform ====
Since 2011, the MPS Lernplattform of the Daimler AG manufactures different products on 3000 m^{2} with the main topic of lean production. The original components of the production as well as 1:10 models with several simulations are used. A press shop, body shop, paint shop, assembly and logistics as parts of the automobile industry are simulated. The assembled products can be reused after the training: e.g. roof control units, sun visors, covers, floor mats or room tears. Qualified in-house employees carry out the training who have didactical background knowledge as well as long-term experience in the production area. The training consists of 20% theory and 80% practice. More than ten different learning modules are offered for participants who take important insights to their daily work. The MPS Lernplattform increasingly relies on cooperation with external partners such as the TU Darmstadt.

==== Festo Learning Factory Scharnhausen ====
The Festo Learning Factory in Scharnhausen is operated by Festo AG since 2014 with four different topics: mechanical processing (1), valve and valve terminal assembly (2), automation and process improvement (4), administration of the learning factory (4). Pneumatic valves and valve terminals are manufactured on 220 m² on four rooms. More than forty learning modules are offered on fourteen different workplaces. The participants are exclusively from Festo, especially for the training of new operators and advanced qualification of incumbent workers. Each team leader or a qualified team specialist trains the operators by themselves. Therefore 'Train-the-trainer'-modules have been developed. The trainings are developed continuously. New products, new processes, new production equipment are integrated.

Table: Examples of learning factories in academia and industry
| Name | Operator | Country | Product | Main Topics |
|---|---|---|---|---|
| Process Learning Factory CiP | Technical University of Darmstadt | Germany | Pneumatic cylinder | Lean production and Industrie 4.0 |
| DFA Demonstration Factory | RWTH Aachen University | Germany | E-Mobility vehicles | Industrie 4.0, prototypes and industrialization |
| Die Lernfabrik | TU Braunschweig | Germany | Diverse | Sustainable production, CPPS, urban production |
| E|Drive-Center | University of Erlangen–Nuremberg | Germany | Electric engines | Production technology |
| Werk150 (formerly ESB Logistics Learning Factory) | ESB Business School Hochschule Reutlingen | Germany | City scooter & accessories | Design, implementation, optimization, and digitization of partially automated assembly and logistics systems |
| ETA-Factory | PTW, Technical University of Darmstadt | Germany | Control Plate for hydraulic pump, Gear-shaft combination | Energy efficiency, energy flexibility |
| Festo Learning Factory Scharnhausen | Festo AG | Germany | Pneumatic valves and valve terminals | Workplace-oriented trainings, Industry 4.0, and lean production |
| iFactory | University of Windsor | Canada | Desksets, belt tensioner | Integrated products – systems learning, Industry 4.0 |
| IFA-Learning Factory | Leibniz University Hannover | Germany | Helicopter and components | Factory planning, lean production, PPC |
| Integrated Learning Factory | Ruhr University Bochum | Germany | Percussion drilling machine | Collaboration of product development and production |
| LEAD Factory | Graz University of Technology | Austria | Scooter | Lean Management, Energy efficiency, Agile operations, Digitalization |
| LEAN-Factory | Fraunhofer IPK, TU Berlin, ITCL GmbH | Germany | Pharmaceutical tablets | Lean management |
| Learning- and Innovation Factory (LIF) | TU Wien | Austria | Slot car | Integrated product & process planning, optimization of manufacturing and assembly operations |
| Learning factory aIE | University of Stuttgart | Germany | Desk tool set | Lean production and quality management |
| Learning Factory Global Production Karlsruhe | Karlsruhe Institute of Technology | Germany | Electric drive | Lean production, assembly planning, Industrie 4.0 |
| Lernfabrik für Schlanke Production (LSP) | Technical University of Munich | Germany | Gears | Lean philosophy, Lean assembly |
| LMS Factory | University Patras | Greece | Diverse | Training, education |
| LPS Learning Factory | Ruhr University Bochum | Germany | Bottle cap, bottle cap holder, various make-to-order products | Lean production, Industrie 4.0, resource efficiency, workers' participation, labor 4.0 |
| MPS Lernplattform | Daimler AG | Germany | Different products | Lean |
| MTA Sztaki Learning Factory Győr | MTA Sztaki | Hungary | Recyclable dummy workpieces | CPPS aspects |
| Operational Excellence Laboratory | Université du Luxembourg | Luxemburg | Hole puncher | Lean production, Industrie 4.0 |
| Pilot Factory Industrie 4.0 | TU Wien | Austria | 3D printer | Factory virtualization, adaptive manufacturing, cyber-physical assembly & logistics |
| Smart Mini-Factory | Free University of Bolzano | Italy | Pneumatic cylinder, pneumatic impact wrench | Smart manufacturing systems, automation |
| Smart Learning Factory - Skopje | Ss. Cyril and Methodius University in Skopje | North Macedonia | Didactical part from automotive industry | Lean Manufacturing, Industry 4.0 |
| Stellenbosch Learning Factory | Stellenbosch University | South Africa | O-scale train set | Lean operations, ergonomics, Industrie 4.0 |
| Process-to-Order Lab (P2O-Lab) | Dresden University of Technology | Germany | Algae, various chemical products | Modularization, digitization and artificial intelligence in the process industry |

== Approach to Competency-Oriented Planning and Design ==
The concept of learning factories offers potentials to former didactical and technical approaches. Through the realistic environment, learners are more motivated and the development of competencies facilitates. Problem-based, project-based or research-based learning is possible. Action-oriented learning results in significant advantages compared to traditional teaching methods. Methods, innovations, and technologies can be transferred to the industry more easily. Through learning factories learners can apply methods on a realistic production environment without the negative effect of stopping production lines in their own enterprise.

Learning Factories are designed on three design levels:

- In the macro level, the complete educational program and the physical factory environment with the factory elements are designed. It includes the social-technical infrastructure (the production environment, production processes, the product, and the employees). In the design process the learning goals, target groups, and other stakeholders are to be included.
- The different learning modules are designed at the meso level. Each learning modules can use different parts of the learning factory environment. The learning process should be structured in this design level.
- The micro level focuses on the learning scenarios within a learning module. The learning scenarios are classified in exploratory, experimental, systematizing or reflective parts. The learning objectives determine the learning scenario. The preparation of the learning factory itself should be considered in this design level as well as the learning support, learning material, learning medium and the learning product.

More details about the design process of learning factories can be seen in the dissertation of Michael Tisch with the title "Modellbasierte Methodik zur kompetenzorientierten Gestaltung von Lernfabriken für die schlanke Produktion".

== Limitations of learning factories ==
The learning factory concept is also limited. The planning, development, construction, and operation of learning factories require financial and personnel resources. Physical learning factories need space in a facility. Machines, workplaces, and other factory elements must be purchased and maintained. Partners and personnel should be willing and able to participate in a learning factory. The sustainability must be ensured through an operating model. Furthermore, learning factories map limited sections of production environments. A single learning factory is not able to provide a suitable, general environment for all challenges in academia and industry. Specific industrial sectors, addressed topics, single production processes, company departments, and target groups are addressed. The mapping abilities of learning factories are limited.

== See also ==
- Manufacturing
- Lean Production
- Competency
- Industrie 4.0
