= National Survey of Student Engagement =

Educational research survey

The National Survey of Student Engagement (NSSE, pronounced: nessie) is a survey mechanism used to measure the level of student participation at universities and colleges in Canada and the United States as it relates to learning and engagement. The results of the survey help administrators and professors to assess their students' student engagement. The survey targets first-year and senior students on campuses. NSSE developed ten student Engagement Indicators (EIs) that are categorized in four general themes: academic challenge, learning with peers, experiences with faculty, and campus environment. Since 2000, there have been over 1,600 colleges and universities that have opted to participate in the survey. Additionally, approximately 5 million students within those institutions have completed the engagement survey. Overall, NSSE assesses effective teaching practices and student engagement in educationally purposeful activities. The survey is administered and assessed by Indiana University School of Education Center for Postsecondary Research.

== History ==
The initial idea of the National Survey of Student Engagement centers on providing an alternative metric of evaluation for colleges and universities to measure "quality" on a national platform and it is designed specifically to gauge the extent of student engagement. The NSSE was birthed in 1998 and financially supported by a grant from the Pew Charitable Trusts. Much of the quality metrics according to the initial working group of higher education leaders that the Pew Charitable Trust organized concluded that there were few external incentives for institutions to partake in "meaningful quality improvement". The quality concept as it relates to colleges and universities has largely been impacted by accrediting agencies, government regulations (e.g. licensure standards), and third-party rankings (e.g. U.S. News & World Report) that focus on student selectivity and faculty credentials. Nevertheless, these types of quality metrics do not give insight regarding the resources institutions invest to facilitate significant academic experiences/activities or effective instructional practices that demonstrate high-level of engagement and success in college

=== Objectives ===
The National Survey of Student Engagement (NSSE) contestably, serves as a tool for four-year institutions to gather data centered on institutional quality, ultimately to be used to improve undergraduate studies. This quality is measured by the energy that students spend engaging in meaningful educational experiences (high-impact practices) during college that have significantly impacted desired learning outcomes and overall student experiences, regardless of institutional type and the individual. Purposeful institutional priorities and practices lead to student engagement and student success in college. Institutions that align their resources to foster engagement potentially experience higher levels of quality– the marriage of purposeful engagement and institutional quality. There are several identifiers that researchers have studied that draw parallels to student success among institutions; the survey provides colleges and universities with the student engagement data that show strengths and opportunities for growth.

== Student engagement defined ==
Students' responses in the survey have been categorized into ten Engagement Indicators (EIs) and narrowly concentrated among four general themes: academic challenge, learning with peers, experiences with faculty, and campus environment. NSSEs ten Engagement Indicators include:higher-order learning, reflective and integrative learning, learning strategies, quantitative reasoning, learning with peers, discussions with diverse others, experiences with faculty, effective teaching practices, quality of interactions, and supportive environments. Moreover, NSSE provides results on six High-Impact practices (HIPs) that are duly noted for their positive outcomes on student learning and retention. These HIPs are known by researchers as educational experiences that shift one's trajectory of success in college. The HIPs refer to: learning community, service-learning, research with faculty (effective for first-year student and seniors), internship or field experience, study abroad, and culminating senior experience that seniors should engage in (e.g. capstone project). In 2008, George Kuh suggested that all students should experience at least one HIP during their first-year and one during senior year. These teaching and learning practices have been proven to be beneficial to college students from various backgrounds.

== Outcomes ==
The survey offers an unconventional assessment for evaluating collegiate quality by collecting data that is used to depict institutional experiences and instructional practices that affects learning and college student success. There are three envisioning principles for data collected by NSSE. The first is to allow a vehicle for institutions to improve upon its undergraduate studies program (e.g. how the institution aligns with its strategic foci). Secondly, external agencies such as accrediting bodies and state agencies of higher education could use the information to gauge institutional effectiveness. Lastly, the publication of results could be of interest to media outlets as a means of incorporating into college ranking metrics.

=== Selected results ===
- While aggregate results generally reveal that underrepresented and underprepared students rate the quality of their interactions with others on campus lower relative to their peers, these groups evidenced no relative disadvantage at an appreciable subset of institutions.
- Average levels of students' experiences with faculty—effective teaching practices and student-faculty interaction—varied notably from one institution to the next, even when examined within selectivity strata.
- One in three first-year students rarely met with an advisor. The proportion who rarely sought advice was higher among commuting, nontraditional-aged, and part-time students—suggesting the need for special outreach efforts for such students.
- The NSSE is occasionally used in other countries to understand how student engagement and higher education is understood elsewhere. In Ireland, StudentSurvey.ie, formerly the Irish Survey of Student Engagement, is a national survey of student engagement in higher education. It was piloted in 2013 and first offered nationally in 2014 to first-year undergraduate, final-year undergraduate and taught postgraduate students. The project has been co-sponsored by the Higher Education Authority, the Irish Universities Association, the Technological Higher Education Association and the Union of Students in Ireland, and was developed with reference to international student-engagement surveys including NSSE and the Australasian Survey of Student Engagement.

== See also ==
- Disengagement compact
- Education
- High School Survey of Student Engagement
- Student engagement
- Undergraduate education
