= Instructional simulation =

Type of simulation

An instructional simulation, also called an educational simulation, is a simulation of some type of reality (system or environment) but which also includes instructional elements that help a learner explore, navigate or obtain more information about that system or environment that cannot generally be acquired from mere experimentation. Instructional simulations are typically goal oriented and focus learners on specific facts, concepts, or applications of the system or environment. Today, most universities make lifelong learning possible by offering a virtual learning environment (VLE). Not only can users access learning at different times in their lives, but they can also immerse themselves in learning without physically moving to a learning facility, or interact face to face with an instructor in real time. Such VLEs vary widely in interactivity and scope. For example, there are virtual classes, virtual labs, virtual programs, virtual library, virtual training, etc. Researchers have classified VLE in 4 types:

- 1st generation VLE: They originated in 1992, and provided the first on line course opportunities. They consisted in a collection of learning materials, discussion forums, testing and e-mail systems all accessible on line. This type of virtual environment was static, and did not allow for interaction among the different components of the system.
- 2nd generation VLE: Originated in 1996, these VLE are more powerful, both in data base integration and functions - planning and administrating, creating and supporting teaching materials, testing and analyzing results. Over 80 forms exist, including Learning Space, WebCT, Top Class, COSE, Blackboard, etc.
- 3rd generation VLE: The novelty of 3rd generation VLE is that they incorporate the newest technologies, accessible in real and non real time (synchronous and synchronous communications), such as audio and video conferences through the internet -‘one to one’ and ‘one to many’, collaboration features for work in groups, seminars, labs, forums, and of course the learning, development, planning, library and administrative functions. Stanford On-line, InterLabs, Classroom 2000 and the system "Virtual University" (VU) are examples of this VLE.
- 4th generation VLE: These are the environments of the future, and represent new learning paradigms, at the center of which are the user and the ‘global resources,’ as opposed to the teacher and the ‘local resources.’ Their main advantage is that learning materials can be created, adapted and personalized to the specific needs and function of each user. Few 4th generations VLE exist, most of them still being in the planning and developing phases. One example of supportive technology is called the ‘multi-agent technology,’ which allows the interface of data among different systems.

== History ==
Simulations of one form or another have been used since the early 1900s as a method for training or training. The United States Defense Modeling and Simulation Coordination Office identifies three main types of simulation: live, virtual, and constructive. Live (live action) and virtual simulations are primarily used for training purposes, whereas a constructive simulation is used to view or predict outcomes like wargaming or stockmarket behavior. Each of these types is based on some reality and is intended to provide the user with a pseudo-experience without the danger, expense, or complexity of real life.

While simulations are used for learning and training purposes, noted authors, such as Clark Aldrich and Andy Gibbons (Model-Centered Instruction) suggest that simulations in and of themselves are not instructional. Rather, a simulation only becomes instructional when instructional elements are included that help expose the learner to key parts or concepts of the system or environment. For example, an F-16 simulator is not inherently instructional because it is primarily intended to replicate the F-16 cockpit behavior and the environments the aircraft operates within. The simulator may be used for training purposes, but it requires an instructor or some other external element to identify key learning aspects of the system to the learner.

In education, simulations have had their use under a number of different names. Ken Jones in the 1980s defined simulations as interactions between people such as role-playing. Others suggest that experiential learning activities like those found in team training or ropes courses are also simulations because they replicate the human decision-making processes groups may display, albeit in a very different environment. These can be considered instructional simulations because the effective use of these simulation types include using instructional elements to help learners focus on key behaviors, concepts or principles.

With the ever decreasing cost of computing tools, virtual and constructive simulation are being used more and more. Simulation is used more and more in e-learning environments because of improved Web-authoring tools and an increasing demand for performance-based training. As a result, more non-technical personnel are involved designing simulation, a field dominated by engineers and computer scientists.

== Instructional design models for simulations ==
Most traditional instructional design models have at least four components:

- Analysis – components usually included are a goal analysis, performance analysis, target population analysis, task analysis, media selection, and cost analysis.
- Design – including interface design, sequencing, lesson design, and learner control
- Development – a collaboration between programmers, graphic artists, writers, subject matter experts, and others during which the educational product is fully developed
- Implementation and Evaluation – delivering the final product to the learners and evaluating whether the goals were met.

ADDIE is an example of an Instructional Systems Design (ISD) model.

== Effectiveness of pedagogy ==
When designing VLEs more functions need to be considered than in designing traditional learning modalities. The process of virtual learning consists of organizational, quality control, correctional and predictable procedures. For example, the effectiveness of the organization of student self-learning - called the ‘pedagogical and didactical function’ in VLEs, will depend on the following:

1. Online content that satisfies the requirements of subject matter standards, while at the same time allows engages students ‘interest in the process of learning. For example, open ended inquiry-based approaches to learning allow students to have some room to pursue individual interests.
2. Level of interactivity of learning environment, to increase motivation and hands-on opportunities for learners. Simulation and animation provide excellent multisensory learning environments.
3. Time management tools for the efficient assimilation of new materials. For example, availability of timetables, schedule of synchronous consultations, embedded hyperlinks for the ready access of information, etc.
4. Maximization of activities that focus on student critical thinking, and information literacy skills, needed for the 21st century, such as acquisition, processing and synthesis of information.
5. Communication modalities between teacher and student, peer to peer and learner to experts. The role of the instructor is that of an organizer, while the student is an initiator of the learning process.

A widely used format for designing online learning environments is WebQuest. However, there are today on the market newer models for instruction that are more interactive and integrated, such as Project Page, MiniQuest, CuriculumQuest, DecisionQuest. Reference: Jakes, D. (2003). "Creating Virtual Workspaces: New Models for Developing Online Curriculum". teachForum: Breakthrough Technologies for 21st century Schools, Chicago, Illinois. April 29, 2003. Retrieved on 6/28/09: http://www.biopoint.com/ibr/techforum.htm

Since the 1990s, trends such as the performance technology movement, constructivism, Electronic Performance Support Systems, rapid prototyping, increasing use of Internet for distance education/distance learning, and knowledge management endeavors have influenced instructional design practices These changes are producing challenges to existing design models. According to Reigeluth (1996), the education and training field is in the midst of a paradigm shift from the Industrial Revolution to the Information Age, requiring a corresponding shift from standardization to customization of instructional design. Moreover, Gros et al. (1997), posit the inflexibility of traditional linear design processes, calling for a more iterative process, while Winn (1997) and Jonassen et al. criticize the positivist assumptions that learning situations are closed systems, imparting knowledge is the instructor's responsibility, and that human behavior is predictable.

There are many alternative models that have been proposed as more conducive to the new Information Age paradigm, including new methods of instruction such as instructional gaming and simulations – Jonassen's promotion of hermeneutics, fuzzy logic and chaos theory as bases for ID, Hoffman's use of Reigeleuth's Elaboration Theory and hypermedia, Akilli & Cagiltay's FIDGE model, among others.

=== Hermeneutics, fuzzy logic, and chaos theory ===
Hermeneutics emphasizes the importance of socio-historical context in mediating the meanings of individuals creating and decoding texts. Massively multiplayer online learning environments, for example, require new social processes that go well with social constructivist, hermeneutic philosophy and methods. Chaos theory looks for order in chaotic systems, looking for repeating patterns such as fractals. It is useful for non-linear, dynamic situations or for situations where a small change in initial conditions can produce great changes later. Finally, fuzzy logic is based on the idea that reality is rarely bivalent, but rather multivalent – in other words, there are many "in-between" values that need to be designed for. Therefore, instructional models should move away from deterministic approaches and design for more probabilistic ways of thinking.

=== Elaboration theory (ET) and hypermedia ===
Key aspects of ET are:

- A single organizing structure that reflects the primary focus of the course.
- Sequencing from simple to complex
- Sequence within the lesson: --For conceptually organized instruction "present the easiest, most familiar organizing concepts first" (p. 251).
  - For procedures, "present the steps in order of their performance"
  - For theoretically organized instruction, move from simple to complex.
  - Place supporting content immediately after related organizing content.
  - Adhere to learning prerequisite relationships in the content.
  - Present coordinate concepts simultaneously rather than serially.
  - Teach the underlying principle before its associated procedure.

Hoffman states that "the Web-like linking that characterizes hypermedia is more alike to the functioning of human cognition than is the traditional linear structure found in much educational programming", further asserting that "this kind of model could lead to the possibility of modularity and plasticity, which would bring along the ease to make changes in response to learner needs without changing the overall structure of the product and rapid development."

=== FIDGE (Fuzzified Instructional Design Development of Game-Like Environments) model ===
This model consists of dynamic phases with fuzzy boundaries, through which instructional designers move non-linearly. The main features are:

- The participants include all actively participating learners and experts
- Teams are composed of multidisciplinary, multi-skilled game-players
- The environment is socio-organizational and cultural
- The process is dynamic, fuzzy, non-linear, and creative
- Based on evaluation, change is continuous
- Evaluation is also continuous, iterative, formative and summative, embedded into each phase
- Time management and scheduling is vital for success, as well as the management of a good leader
- The model is suitable for game-like learning environments and educational games, for novice to expert level instructional designers and learners.

== Virtual worlds in instructional simulation ==
A virtual world is an interactive 3-D environment where users are immersed in the environment. Users can manipulate the environment and interact with other users. Depending on the degree of immersion, users can begin playing a game, interact with other users, attend seminars, or complete course work for an online class. Online discussion groups and social networks such as Myspace and Facebook are already being used to supplement interaction within coursework (Baker 2009).

Second Life is a virtual world where users create avatars. An avatar is a virtual representation of the user to other users. These avatars then interact with any other user within the Second Life world. Avatars can purchase virtual land, own buildings, and travel, interact, conduct business, and even attend lectures by professors. Second Life is running 24 hours a day and is tied into the Internet, so there are always other avatars to interact with.

MMORPGs such as World of Warcraft and Star Wars Galaxies are video game based virtual environments. These game engines hold the potential for instructional simulation. Unlike Second Life, these are pre-designed games with their own set of objectives that need to be completed through a progression.

=== Uses in education ===
In education, virtual learning environments are simulated experiences which utilize the pedagogical strategies of instructional modeling and role playing for the teaching of new concepts. The environment in which the experiences are presented is a virtual one often accessed via a computer or other video projection interface. Immersive virtual environment headsets have been used with younger children and students with special needs. The advantages of using instructional simulators via VLEs include: students are motivated when they are able to use computers and other technology; VLEs allow for interaction, exploration, and experimentation with locations, objects, and environments that would otherwise be unavailable in the absence of the VLE; instructors can adapt programs and parameters of the virtual learning experience to meet individual learner needs; when multi-user virtual environments are used collaborative and cooperative learning is encouraged; VLEs relate to students the real-world relevance of their learning by extending concepts and skills to application in the simulated environment; and learning can occur in an emotionally and physically safe environment without detrimental consequence.

The use of instructional simulation with individuals with special needs is gaining more attention. Mitchell, Parsons, and Leonard (2007) created a "Virtual Café" program designed to teach social interaction skills to adolescents with autism spectrum disorder (ASD). The program provides feedback to guide, or scaffold, the user toward making appropriate social behavior decisions. Virtual learning environments are also beginning to be used to teach children with ASD how to respond in potentially dangerous situations such as crossing the street and evacuating a building on fire (Strickland, McAllister, Coles, and Osborne 2007). The instructional simulation provides a safe environment within which to practice appropriate response skills.

Distance learning is growing. The importance of a physical classroom is being reduced as the technology of distance learning develops (Sanders, 2006). Sanders (2006) present a warning that students may do well in distance learning environments, however they need to have engaging moments within the course. He also warns students to critically assess a new technology before adopting it as a learning tool. The virtual learning environment needs to simulate the learning process, using goals and objectives to measure the learners’ achievement. Sanders (2006) uses movies like Terminator 2: Judgment Day, The Matrix, and I, Robot as callbacks to allegorical warnings of potential mishaps of relying too much on technology. He presents possible ways to balance a distance course so that it can effectively simulate a learning environment.

Barney, Bishop, Adlong, and Bedgood (2009) studied the use of a 3D virtual laboratory as a tool to familiarize distance learning chemistry students with an actual chemistry laboratory. While it was not incorporated into the initial study, the researchers suggest including instructional scaffolding experiences to help alleviate students’ anxieties with applying mathematics and chemistry concepts in the actual laboratory setting (Barney, Bishop, Adlong, and Bedgood 2009). The virtual laboratory does not replace the real-world experience, rather it helps to enhance the student's schema of a chemistry laboratory and prepare them for performance expectations in the actual environment. Web-based virtual science laboratories are also used with elementary school students. In their study, Sun, Lin, and Yu (2008) found that students who used a web-based virtual science laboratory in conjunction with traditional teaching methods not only found the learning experience more enjoyable, they also performed better academically and received higher grades.

Baker (2009) suggests multi-user virtual environments or MUVEs have the potential to engage students. Second Life holds more of a purpose in interaction (Baker, 2009). Instructors can hold lectures; students can collaborate through chat in Second Life. When compared to a discussion board, Second Life is a viable alternative for distance learning students to develop group work skills. At Chesapeake High School in Baltimore County, Maryland, students explore the ecological environment surrounding Mount St. Helens via a 3D virtual learning environment (Curriculum Review 2009). Students navigate through the environment with a virtual unmanned vehicle and work collaboratively to solve ecological and environmental problems that are built into the program for instructional purposes. Engaging in the VLE provides many opportunities for application, data collection, and problem solving.

== Uses in medicine ==
Sokolowski classifies medical simulations in 3 categories: 1. simulators based on physical models, usually referred to as the Human Patient Simulator (HPS), of which several prototype exist for different purposes (CentraLine Man, Noelle and Pediasim mannequins); 2. virtual reality training simulators based on computers – i.e. LapVR Surgical Simulator, and Suture Tutor; 3. a hybrid model of the first two kinds combines a realistic 3D computerized representation of an organ system, for example, with the ability to interface with it through haptic devices.

The use of simulation-based learning in the medical field has many benefits, including patient safety, accelerating diagnostic and therapeutic procedures, unfulfilled demand for medical personnel, medical cost reduction and lowering of medical errors that amount to loss of life and associated costs. The use of current technologies allow for very high fidelity simulations. These include Immersive Virtual Environments (IVEs)- computer based 3D environments known as serious games, and other very highly immersive virtual environments, such as Cave Automatic Virtual environment (CAVE), in which the student sits in a projection room wearing goggles and gloves equipped with sensors. This haptic technology activates the sense of touch, allowing the trainee to interface with a simulated patient, as well as to receive visual and auditory feedbacks, making the simulated learning experience very realistic.

According to research, the best instructional simulators, medical or otherwise, contain these elements:

- provide feedback
- involve repetitive practice
- integrate with the curricula
- possess a range of difficulty levels
- involve multiple learning strategies
- capture clinical variations
- occur in a control environment
- utilize individualized learning
- define expected outcomes
- possess validity

Immersive virtual environments (IVEs) in medical education range from teaching simple skills (taking a patient's blood) to complex skills (internal surgery). Different medical care providers use simulations for different purposes: emergency medical technicians, medics involved in combat environments, nurses, doctors, surgeons and medical First Responders in. IVEs simulate the human body so as to provide the student or trainee with the opportunity to realistically practice and thus become proficient as to the particular technique to be taught. IVEs are commonly used when teaching patient examination, surgical procedures and assessment (individual and collaborative). Students are relieved to know that these simulations are practice and appreciate the opportunity to make mistakes now rather than later. The use of IVEs provides a controlled, safe environment for students to learn and so the anxiety factor is reduced. Students can discuss the symptoms more openly than they could with an actual patient. At the same time, however, students use all the protocol they would with a real patient. That means they introduce themselves, address the patients by name and respect their privacy.

The use of the simulation saves lives and money by reducing medical errors, training time, operating room time and the need to replace expensive equipment. Simulation users may practice on a variety of patients, each of which has a different case history, exhibits unique symptoms, and responds to user actions with appropriate physiological responses. As in real life, patient anatomy moves with the beating of the heart and the breathing of the lungs while tissues deform, bruise and bleed. The system generates a detailed evaluation after each session, enabling users and supervisors to measure the success of simulated procedures.

=== Barriers to instructional simulation in medicine ===
Simulations in medicine have been in use as early as the 16th century when the use of training mannequins helped to reduce the high maternal and infant mortality rates. Today they have evolved, to include IVEs, CAVE, robotic surgery, etc., but they are still relatively limited in their use by the health industry. Medicine is a profession that uses very advanced technical, high risk, as well as behavioral skills. However, unlike other areas with similar requirements (such as aviation), medicine has not totally embraced the use of simulations to assist with necessary medical training. The limited use of simulations for training in the medical field can be explained by several factors, including cost control, relatively limited modeling of the human body, lack of scientific evidence of effectiveness, and resistance to change by professional in the field. (Ziv, et al. 2003). A later study, conducted by Amalberti et al.(2005), points to 5 systemic structural barriers to the use of simulators to advance medical training. These are:

1. Unlimited decision-making autonomy of individual medical staff; instead, teamwork and regulations should anticipate problems and processes across departments.
2. Unlimited performance of individuals and of the system; instead, hours of work should be limited and shortage of staff addressed because excessive productivity-not competence, leads to medical errors.
3. Focus on status of individual; instead, standards of excellence of equivalent actors should be the goal.
4. Overprotection against personal liability; instead, more consideration should be given to "unintended consequences", and to system-level arbitration to optimize safety strategies.
5. Overregulation and technical complexities in medicine; instead, simplification of regulations is needed.

The existence of these barriers leads to a lower rate of patient safety, and prevent the health industry to come closer to the goal of "ultrasafe performance," already achieved by the civil aviation and the nuclear power industries
