= Robert Maribe Branch =

Robert Maribe Branch

Robert Maribe Branch is an American educational technologist and professor of Learning, Design and Technology at the Mary Frances Early College of Education at the University of Georgia (UGA). His work focuses on instructional design models, particularly the ADDIE process, which he describes in his book Instructional Design: The ADDIE Approach (2009). Branch co-authored the third edition of Survey of Instructional Development Models (1997) with Kent L. Gustafson, and he has co-edited the Educational Media and Technology Yearbook since 1997. Branch has taught in Botswana as a Peace Corps volunteer and in South Africa as a Fulbright lecturer, as well as at Syracuse University and UGA in the United States. He also served as president of the Association for Educational Communications and Technology (AECT) from 2014 to 2015.

== Early life and education ==
Branch was raised by a mother from Newberry, South Carolina, and a father from Augusta, Georgia. He graduated from Aviation High School in New York City in 1974, which made him eligible for airframe and power plant (A&P) certification. He began his higher education at the New York City College of Technology, and went on to complete a Bachelor of Science degree at Elizabeth City State University in North Carolina and a Master of Arts degree at Ball State University in Muncie, Indiana. He earned a Doctor of Education degree from Virginia Tech in 1989, specializing in curriculum development and instructional design.

== Career ==
As a Peace Corps volunteer, Branch taught technology education at Lobatse Secondary School in Botswana, before becoming a lecturer at the University of Botswana. He also worked as a classroom teacher of technological studies. While completing his doctorate at Virginia Tech, he taught a College Success Strategies course for the Corps of Cadets and served as an associate director of the Virginia Governor's School for the Gifted, a summer residential program.

After completing his doctorate at Virginia Tech, Branch joined the faculty of Syracuse University, where he taught graduate courses in the Department of Instructional Design, Development, and Evaluation and became a tenured associate professor. He was also associate director of the ERIC Clearinghouse on Information & Technology. In 1995 he was a Fulbright Program lecturer and researcher at the University of KwaZulu-Natal in South Africa, where he researched student-centered learning spaces and helped establish a master's degree program in educational technology.

He joined UGA in 1996. In 1997, he was an associate professor in the Department of Instructional Technology at UGA, and he was promoted to full professor in 2000. He teaches undergraduate and graduate courses in message design, instructional design, project management and technology for teachers, and served as department head for 15 years. He is also a certified mediator with the State of Georgia Office of Dispute Resolution and a trained facilitator in Reflective Structured Dialogue.

Branch served AECT as president-elect, president and past president from 2014 to 2016. In these roles he led the Nominating Committee and planned the association's 2014 International Convention in Jacksonville, Florida.

== Research ==
Much of Branch's research uses diagrams to break down complex ideas and processes, particularly in STEM education. In 1997, his primary area of interest was described as "the accurate portrayal of the instructional design and development process". He has written about designing student-centered learning spaces. According to his UGA profile, Branch has written over 86 papers in refereed journals, 15 book chapters and edited 9 books.

=== Instructional design models ===
Branch co-authored the third edition of Survey of Instructional Development Models (1997) with Kent L. Gustafson. They noted that there are hundreds of instructional development models in the literature and therefore described only a selection, chosen for historical significance, distinctive structure or perspective, and how widely each model was used. Models are presented as conceptual and communication tools that help designers picture, guide and manage the process of creating instruction. A fifth edition, retitled Survey of Instructional Design Models, was co-authored with Tonia A. Dousay and published by AECT in 2015. In 1997, Gustafson and Branch also published "Revisioning models of instructional development" in the journal Educational Technology Research and Development.

The Survey classifies models according to a taxonomy created by Gustafson (1981, 1991). The taxonomy sorts models by the assumptions their creators made about how instruction would be developed and delivered.

- Classroom-oriented models assume a teacher working mostly alone with limited resources, who selects and adapts existing materials for a small amount of instruction.
- Product-oriented models assume a well-resourced team of trained specialists, including a professional manager, who create a specific instructional product for use by people other than the developers. The product is often original material that may be sold commercially.
- System-oriented models, such as the Dick and Carey model, assume a skilled team of developers and subject matter experts who produce a large amount of instruction, such as an entire course or curriculum. The instruction addresses an organization's problems or goals, and these models usually involve extensive front-end analysis, tryout and revision.

Gustafson and Branch conclude that designers should choose a model that suits their situation, rather than changing the situation to suit a particular model.

=== ADDIE approach ===
The ADDIE concept as described by Branch (2009), with evaluation connected to every phase.

In 2009, Branch published Instructional Design: The ADDIE Approach with Springer. According to the publisher, the purpose of the book was to serve as an introductory overview of ADDIE aimed at persons who are new to instructional design. It was written partly because many of the newer design models, including online and multimedia learning models, are complex and often leave out their ADDIE origins. Branch's book focuses on the basic principles of ADDIE, while avoiding specialist language where possible.

The book organizes ADDIE into five phases, each with its own purpose and deliverable:

- Analyze: find out what is causing the gap between current and desired performance; the deliverable is an Analysis Summary.
- Design: confirm what learners should be able to do and how it will be tested; the deliverable is a Design Brief.
- Develop: create the learning materials and verify that they work; the deliverable is the Learning Resources themselves.
- Implement: cultivate an engaging learning environment that draws in students; the deliverable is an Implementation Strategy.
- Evaluate: judge the quality of the materials and processes both before and after they are used; the deliverable is an Evaluation Plan.

Branch describes ADDIE as a "product development paradigm" rather than a model. According to Branch, ADDIE is a flexible, iterative process that is able to guide complex situations. He applies it to creating learning resources, where the learning is student-centered, innovative, authentic and inspirational. The book sets out 21 common design procedures across the five phases. Each procedure is presented as a lesson plan, with an objective, prior knowledge, content, practice and closure, so that the book can serve as a course text for introductory instructional design. He shows the Evaluate phase at the center of the process with revisions feeding into each phase, and notes that there is "no single correct sequence" of procedures.

In the book, ADDIE is also described as both generative and responsive, since it is able to apply theories in different settings while also adapting to specific goals. Each of the five phases follows the same format: input-process-output. Information is taken in, then worked on through a set of procedures before being used to create a deliverable. This deliverable is then checked before the next phase builds on it.

Branch argues that the process should begin by analyzing the cause of a performance gap and should stop if the cause is not a lack of knowledge or skill. He also introduces the idea of a "Line of Sight," a way of keeping needs, goals, objectives, strategies and assessments aligned throughout the process.

== Visual representation of design models ==
Branch has specific ideas on how instructional design models should be depicted. In the Survey of Instructional Development Models (1997), Gustafson and Branch drew on Branch's research (Branch, 1997) to argue that many instructional design models are seen as too rigid and simplistic because of the way they are drawn. They point out that the straight rows of boxes joined by one-way arrows that were traditionally used quite often failed to show the complexity of the design process. To better reflect how instructional design is actually practiced, features such as curved shapes linked by two-way arrows, or overlapping procedures can be used.

Branch's own ADDIE concept diagram follows this approach. He places Evaluate at the center, surrounded by Analyze, Design, Develop and Implement. The phases are connected to each other by curved lines, showing an iterative process. Revision is needed at each stage.

=== Influence ===
Branch's work is widely cited. As of October 2026, over 17,500 citations of his work, including approximately 11,400 for his book Instructional Design: The ADDIE Approach, were listed on Google Scholar.

Stanley D. Zenor, the executive director of AECT, wrote in the foreword section of the Survey of Instructional Development Models (1997) that the book "should be required reading for every student seeking a degree in Instructional Systems Technology". AECT's own centennial history also describes Branch as "an influential leader" within the organization and the instructional and learning technology fields.

Choice, a publication of the American Library Association, in its July 2025 guide, describes Instructional Design: The ADDIE Approach as offering "a deeper dive into ADDIE", where each ADDIE step is linked to common procedures, theories and strategies. The book also presents each chapter as a lesson for readers, with objectives, examples and practice work.

== Selected works ==
- Co-editor, Educational Media and Technology Yearbook (annual, 1997–present). Springer.
- Gustafson, K. L., & Branch, R. M. (1997). Revisioning models of instructional development. Educational Technology Research and Development, 45(3), 73–89. doi:10.1007/BF02299731
- Gustafson, K. L., & Branch, R. M. (1997). Survey of Instructional Development Models (3rd ed.). ERIC Clearinghouse on Information & Technology. ISBN 0-937597-43-0
- van den Akker, J., Branch, R. M., Gustafson, K., Nieveen, N., & Plomp, T. (Eds.). (1999). Design Approaches and Tools in Education and Training. Kluwer Academic.
- Gustafson, K. L., & Branch, R. M. (2002). Survey of Instructional Development Models (4th ed.). ERIC Clearinghouse on Information & Technology.
- Branch, R. M. (2009). Instructional Design: The ADDIE Approach. Springer. ISBN 978-0-387-09505-9
- Branch, R. M., & Kopcha, T. J. (2014). Instructional design models. In J. M. Spector, M. D. Merrill, J. Elen, & M. J. Bishop (Eds.), Handbook of Research on Educational Communications and Technology (4th ed., pp. 77–87). Springer. doi:10.1007/978-1-4614-3185-5_7
- Branch, R. M., & Dousay, T. A. (2015). Survey of Instructional Design Models (5th ed.). Association for Educational Communications and Technology.
- Branch, R. M., & Stefaniak, J. E. (2019). Instructional design theory. In I. Jung (Ed.), Open and Distance Education Theory Revisited (pp. 85–94). Springer. doi:10.1007/978-981-13-7740-2_10

== Awards and honors ==
- 1995 – Fulbright Program Lecturer and Researcher at the University of KwaZulu-Natal.
- 1998 – Young Researcher Award, Research and Theory Division, AECT.
- 2014–2015 – President, Association for Educational Communications and Technology (AECT).
- 2017 – AECT Special Service Award, with Michael Orey, for co-editing the book Educational Media and Technology Yearbook.
- 2017 – Inducted into the University of Georgia Teaching Academy.
- 2018 – Inaugural cohort, University System of Georgia Chancellor's Learning Scholars.
