= Andrew S. Gibbons =

American instructional design and technology practitioner

Andrew S. Gibbons is an American practitioner and theorist in the field of instructional design and technology. He has proposed an architectural theory of instructional design influenced by the structural principles of artifact modularization drawn from a number of design disciplines, as exemplified by the work of Carliss Baldwin and Kim B. Clark.

== Education ==
In 1969, Gibbons earned a B.A. in English with a chemistry minor from Brigham Young University. In 1974, he completed a doctorate in instructional psychology at Brigham Young University. During that time, he worked on the research team of M. David Merrill, assisting in the conception of component display theory. Component display theory provided the basis later for Merrill's instructional transaction theory.

== Academic career ==
Gibbons accumulated eighteen years of practical design experience as a project director and consultant for two start-up instructional design consultancies: Courseware Incorporated and Wicat Systems (World Institute for Computer-Aided Instruction). The idea of computer-based instruction did not exist in the thinking of the business and educational leaders in 1974, though research was conducted in high-tech laboratories as early as the 1950s, but cost and technology factors prohibited widespread dissemination. The opportunity to create large-scale new technology–based designs for a variety of training clients provided Gibbons with many insights into the issues of creating instructional experiences efficiently that were also effective.

In 1993, Gibbons moved to a teaching and research position at the Department of Instructional Technology of Utah State University, associating himself once more with M. David Merrill's ID2 research team. From 1993 to 2003, the conceptual basis for an architecture-oriented design theory grew, resulting in the publication of a book that began to show architectural themes that would evolve into the architectural design theory.

In 2003, Gibbons became the department chair at Brigham Young University for the Department of Instructional Psychology and Technology in the David O. McKay School of Education. During this time, the architectural design theory took its published form in a series of articles and a book. Professor emeritus status was awarded in 2016. Gibbons continues to remain active in researching and writing on architectural design theory.

== Research and books ==
Gibbons' architectural design theory unifies what otherwise would appear to be separate threads of his work on design theory. The question had to be addressed early whether "theory" was an appropriate term to use referring to a system of design thinking. Gibbons supported his position that it was, citing the description of a uniquely design-related type of theory by Herbert Simon in Sciences of the Artificial. Gibbons addressed the issue in a paper titled "Explore, explain, design" with co-author C. Victor Bunderson. In this view, explanation, which is the goal of science, is carried out in search of theories about "how things work", leading ideally toward a hypothesized, unifying theory of everything; in contrast, research on design processes and principles is carried out in search of theories of "how things can be made to work". Vincenti, Klir, Edelson and others describe research in engineering (design) that can lead to design theory that is distinct from scientific theory in several ways.

Overall, Gibbons' published work represents the gradual emergence of the architectural theory and then multiple attempts to demonstrate the viability of the theory by fleshing out details. His theory of model-centered instruction, for example, separates two major concerns of instructional designers: content and strategy. The term "content" in this context refers to abstracted subject-matter and not media resources. Model-centered instruction proposes that the most appropriate form of content is a dynamic interactive model and that experiencing and exploring the model should be augmented by support of different types. This counters the common intuition that verbal and visual expressions of content are sufficient. Model-centering forces the designer to separate decisions about subject-matter from decisions about its expression (messaging and representation) and from the means of leading learners into interactions with it ("strategic" interaction). It leaves open the question of the means (expression controls) by which the learner might carry out the interactions.

Gibbons and his colleagues explored design considerations for simulations in the light of model-centering. As the architectural theory emerged, this led to a description of how designers might use it as a tool to guide the production of simulation designs without relying on a process design model.

In the early 1990s, the interests of large-scale training distributors turned toward standard approaches for producing and distributing technology-involved instruction on a massive scale. A standard plan for product modularization was considered by them to be a solution. The question was, which dimensions to standardize. The U.S. Department of Defense funded the Advanced Distributed Learning Initiative and a large number of commercial interests subscribed to the IMS Global Learning Consortium. Each major project created a unique product packaging standard, with its own centralized data collection and learner management functions. Both standards are widely used.

In a different line of work, Gibbons and Langton conducted a two-year project to validate one of the claims of the architectural theory: the claim that for every functional design layer there are numerous theories from the literature of related design fields capable of informing design within that layer specifically. The control layer was selected for study, the layer within which the designer determines the kinds of expressive controls the learner will be given. An extensive literature review revealed a number of such theories that could improve the design of an interactive instructional control system. This has encouraged further studies of additional layers.

As the architectural theory emerged, Gibbons proposed that, in addition to bodies of theory, there exist a pools of design language terms related to different layers and that the expertise of a designer can be expressed in terms of the designer's familiarity with the languages of the different layers. Moreover, from these languages individual designers and group designers draw their preferred stock of design constructs. A study of design languages of dancers and their expression through notation was described by Waters and Gibbons, which demonstrated that design notation makes possible the public sharing of designs and the co-ordination of design concepts among design team participants. Rather than being static, it was shown that pools grow and contract as terms fall into and out of use through innovation and that, though terms may be shared among design team members, the ultimate range of an individual designer is set by the individual's knowledge of terms in the pools or the ability to invent new terms. This led to a proposal that designer training should expose novice designers to the existence of these terminologies and their usefulness in generating innovative designs within teams.

=== Selected book chapters ===
- Gibbons, A. S., Fairweather, P. G. (2000). "Computer-Based Instruction" in Tobias, S. & Fletcher, D. (eds.), Training and Retraining: A Handbook for Business, Industry, Government, and Military. Division 15 of the American Psychological Association and Macmillan Reference USA.
- Gibbons, A. S., Fairweather, P. G. (2000). "Computer-Based Instruction" in Tobias, S. & Fletcher, D. (eds.), Training and Retraining: A Handbook for Business, Industry, Government, and Military. Division 15 of the American Psychological Association and Macmillan Reference USA.
- Gibbons, A. S., Lawless, K., Anderson, T. A., Duffin, J. R. (2000). "The Web and Model-Centered Instruction" in Khan, B. (ed.), Web-Based Instruction (vol. 2). Educational Technology Publications.
- Gibbons, A. S., Sommer, S. (2007). "Layered design in an instructional simulation" in Shelton, B. & Wiley, D. (eds.), The Design and Use of Simulation Computer Games in Education. Sense Publications.
- Stubbs, S. T., Gibbons, A. S. (2007). "Using ID layers to categorize design drawings" in Botturi, L & Stubbs, T. (eds.), Handbook of Visual Languages for Instructional Design: Theories and Practices. Information Science Reference.
- Gibbons, A. S. (2008). "Model-centered Instruction, the Design, and the Designer" in D. Ifenthaler & P. Pirnay-Dummer (eds.), Understanding models for learning and instruction: Essays in honor of Norbert M. Seel (pp. 12). Springer.
- Gibbons, A. S., Botturi, L., Boot, E., Nelson, J. (2008). "Design languages" in J. M. Spector, M. D. Merrill, J. van Merrienboer, & M. Driscoll (eds.), Handbook of Research on Educational Communications and Technology, 3rd ed. (pp. 12). Lawrence Erlbaum Associates.
- Stubbs, S. T., Gibbons, A. S. (2008). "The power of design drawing in other design fields" in L. Botturi & T. Stubbs (eds.), Handbook of Visual Languages for Instructional Design: Theories and Practices (pp. 18). Information Science Reference.
- Gibbons, A. S., Rogers, P. C. (2009). "Coming at design from a different angle: Functional design" in L. Moller, J. B. Huett, and D. M. Harvey (eds.), Learning and instructional technologies for the 21st Century. Springer.
- Gibbons, A. S., Boling, E., Smith, K. M. (2012). "Instructional design models" in M. Spector, M. D. Merrill, J. Elen, and M. J. Bishop (eds.), Handbook of research in educational communications and technology (4th ed.). Association for Educational Communications and Technology.
- Graham, C. R., Henrie, C. R., Gibbons, A. S. (2013). "Developing models and theory for blended learning research" in Blended learning: Research perspectives II. Routledge
- Gibbons, A. S., Boling, E., Smith, K. M. (2014). "Instructional design models" in Handbook of research on educational communications technology, 4th ed. Springer.
- Gibbons, A. S. (2014). "Eight views of instructional design and what they should mean to instructional designers" in B. Hokanson and A.S. Gibbons (eds.), Design in educational technology: Design thinking, design process, and the design studio. Springer.
- Graham, C. R., Henrie, C., Gibbons, A. S. (2014). "Developing models and theory for blended learning research" in Blended learning: Research perspectives volume 2 (pp. 13–33). Routledge.

=== Selected journal articles ===
- Gibbons, A. S., Fairweather, P. G. (2000). "Distributed Learning: Two Steps Forward, One Back? One Forward, Two Back?" IEEE Concurrency, 8(2), 8-9+.
- Boot, E., Nelson, J., Van Merrienboer, J., Gibbons, A. S. (2007). "Stratification, elaboration, and formalization of design documents: Effects on the production of materials" British Journal of Educational Technology, 38, 917-933.
- Gibbons, A. S., Waki, R., Fairweather, P. (2008). "Adding an expert to the team: The expert flight plan critic" British Journal of Educational Technology, 39, 324-335.
- Gibbons, A. S., Merrill, P., Swan, R., Campbell, J. O., Christensen, E., Insalaco, M., Wilcken, W. (2008). "Re-examining the implied role of the designer" Quarterly Review of Distance Education, 9, 127-137.
- McDonald, J., Gibbons, A. S. (2009). "Technology I, II, and III: Criteria for understanding and improving the practice of instructional technology" Educational Technology Research and Development, 57, 377-392.
