= Robert Heinich =

American instructional designer (1923–2020)

Robert Heinich (May 31, 1923 – January 12, 2020) was an American instructional designer, instructional technologist, author, and editor.

== Early life and education ==
Robert Heinich attended Stuyvesant High School in New York City. He then studied at The Cooper Union, a private college in Manhattan. However, his studies were interrupted by World War II. During the war he joined the Army Air Corps and served from 1943 to 1946. In 1946 he enrolled at Colorado State College, currently known as the University of Northern Colorado, and became a student assistant in a department that used audiovisual equipment. This experience spurred him into his career in instructional design. At Colorado State College, he earned his BA (1948) and MA (1949) in Education. In 1949, he was employed as the Audio-Visual Director at Colorado State.

In 1962, Heinich began studying for his PhD at the University of Southern California (USC). Meanwhile, he worked as an assistant professor in the School of Education at USC. In 1967, he completed his doctorate and won the college's Dissertation of the Year Award. After completing his PhD, Heinich spent two years as the director of the Educational Services Division at Doubleday and Co., a publishing company. From 1979 to 1984, he headed the Instructional Systems Technology program at the University of Indiana. In 1986, he became the director of Hangzhou University in China, as part of the UI Exchange Programme. He retired from the Indiana University in 1990. Outside of IU, Heinich served as a co-editor, senior consulting editor, contributing editor, and editorial board member for a variety of academic journals, including Educational Technology, Educational Communication and Technology, and the Journal of Educational Computing Research. In 1975 he was given the Special Service award from the AECT (Association for Educational Communications and Technology), and in 1981, he was given a Distinguished Service Award by the same organization.

== Research ==
Heinich is best known for his contribution to the fields of instructional design and instructional technology. He promoted a technocratic approach to schooling, an approach where technology specialists would decide when and where technology would be used. Henrich made attempts to simplify the field of educational technology, as he believed that the 1963 definition by the Association for Educational Communications and Technology (AECT) was too complicated. Heinich had discovered a generalizable principle about educational technology, that its visibility was always distinct from instruction with visual materials.

"Technology can only be effective when we pull apart the elements of a process and step by step devise technical means to achieve our goals in a systematic way"

— Robert Heinich, p. 80

Heinich, Michael Molenda of Indiana University, and James D. Russell of Purdue University created the ASSURE Model for teaching. The name is an acronym which stands for:

- Analyse Learners;
- State Objectives;
- Select Methods, Media and Materials;
- Utilize Methods, Media and Materials;
- Require Learner Participation; and
- Evaluate and Revise.

In an interview for the AECT's History Makers Project, Heinich stated that the ASSURE model was his idea. According to Heinich, the model "incorporates Robert Gagne's Events of Instruction to assure effective use of media in instruction".

The purpose of this model was to guide the integration of technology into school curriculum in the most effective way and it gained mainstream popularity for its popularity among educators. The ASSURE model was first mentioned in “Instructional Media: The New Technologies of Instruction by authored by Robert Heinich, Molenda, and Russel Model of Instructional Design, which Heinich won two awards for. In later editions of the book, authors Sharon Smaldina and Deborah Lowthers also became associated with the model, defining it as an instructional system or guideline that teachers can use to develop lesson plans that integrate the use of technology and media. The distinguishing feature of this model was that it was focused on planning and conducting instruction that incorporated media. According to many evaluators such as Kent Gustafson of the ERIC Clearinghouse, the model was also easy to understand and apply to classroom learning.

=== Research into the use of the ASSURE ===
- The Adaptation of a Residential Course to Web-Based Environment for Increasing Productivity by Tuzun et al. (2016)
- Experiences from the Process of Designing Lessons with Interactive Whiteboard: ASSURE as a Road Map by Bahar Baran (2010)
- An application of ASSURE model to solve contextual problems in virtual classroom proceedings by Lopez-Betancourt, A. & Garcia Rodriguez, M.L. (2015)
- Developing a Pre-Service Teachers' Capacity of TPACK Integration by Designing a Math Lesson with ASSURE Model by Hsing-Wen Hu (2015)

== Awards ==
Heinich won several awards for his contribution to the field of Instructional technology, including:

- Special Service award (1975)
- Distinguished Service Award (1981)
- "DESI" award (Design Institute of America) for his book Instructional Media and the New Technologies of Instruction (1982)
- Communication of the Year Award (from the National Society for Performance and Instruction.) for his book Instructional Media and the New Technologies of Instruction (1982).
- A Presidential Citation of the International Society for Performance and Instruction (AECT)
- A Trail Blazer Award from Northern Colorado College as an outstanding Alumnus.

== Publications ==
This is a list of Dr. Robert Heinich's publications.

- "APPLICATION OF SYSTEMS CONCEPTS TO INSTRUCTION" (1966)
- "Technology Makes Instruction Visible," 1968
- "Technology and the Management of Instruction, Monograph 4," 1970
- "Technology and Teacher Productivity," 1971
- "Some Social Considerations of Networking," 1971
- "Management Models and Instructional Technology," 1973
- "An Analysis of Systemic Barriers to Educational Technology and Instructional Productivity," 1975
- "Legal Barriers to Educational Technology and Instructional Productivity," 1976
- "The John Henry Effect," 1983
- "The Proper Study of Instructional Technology," ECTJ (Educational Communication and Technology), Summer 1984
- "Instructional Technology and the Structure of Education," 1985
- "Process Technologies," 1993
- "A Definition and Rationale for Instructional Technology," undated
- "T-Shift, "Technology Makes Instruction Visible," undated"
- Application of Systems Thinking to Instruction (1965)
- Instructional Media and the New Technologies of Instruction (1983),
- Educating All Handicapped Children (1979)
- Instructional Media: The New Technologies of Instruction (1989)
- Instructional Media and the New Technologies of Instruction (1993)
- Instructional Media and Technologies for Learning (1996)
- Instructor's Guide to Accompany Instructional Media & Technologies for Learning, 5th Edition (1996)
- Instructional Media and Technologies for Learning (1999)
- Technology and the Management of Instruction (2000)
- Instructional Technology and Media for Learning & Clips from the Classroom (2005)
- Legal Barriers to Educational Technology and Instructional Productivity. (1976)

== Bibliography ==
- ASSURE Instructional Design Models. International Journal of Education and Gustafson, K. L., & Powell, G. C. (1991). Survey of Instructional Development Models with an Annotated ERIC Bibliography. Second Edition. Retrieved from http://files.eric.ed.gov/fulltext/ED335027.pdf
- Interview with Dr. Robert Heinich [Video file]. (2013, March 15). An Interview with Robert Heinich. Retrieved from Youtube
- Januszewski A. (2001): Educational Technology: The Development of a Concept pgs 51–53, retrieved from
- ROBERT HEINICH, May 31, 1923, January 12, 2020, retrieved in October from
- Robert Heinich papers, Collection C538, Indiana University Archives, Bloomington
- Russell, J. D., & Dennis, S. (1994, April). Improving technology implementation in grades 5–12 with the ASSURE model. THE Journal., 21(9), 66–70.
- Tuzun, H., Sarica, C. H., Cetin, M. N., Kokoc, M., Sert, G. & Ahr, A. (2016). The Adaptation of a Residential Course to Web-Based Environment for Increasing Productivity. In Dickenson, P., & Jaurez, J. J. (2016). Increasing productivity and efficiency in online teaching. (pp. 43–63). Hershey, PA: Information Science Reference.
- Zhou, C. (2016). Handbook of research on creative problem-solving skill development in higher education. Hershey, PA: IGI Global
