= Barbara Lockee =

Educational technology author

Barbara B. Lockee is the Associate Vice Provost of Faculty Affairs and Professor of Instructional Design and Technology in the School of Education at Virginia Tech. She is known for her work on instructional design and technology-mediated learning.

== Education and career ==
Lockee was born in Tennessee and then grew up in North Carolina. She learned to program computers at a young age, starting with a Commodore 64, and a high school English teacher encouraged her to consider a career in journalism. Lockee received her BA (1986) and MA (1991) from Appalachian State University. She received her Ph.D. from Virginia Tech in 1996. Lockee joined the faculty of Virginia Tech in 2001, and was promoted to full professor in 2007.

Lockee was the president of the Association for Educational Communications and Technology.

== Work ==
Her research interests focus on instructional design and technology-mediated learning. In her 2019 co-authored book, Streamline ID: A practical guide to instructional design, Lockee addressed both the needs of novices as well as experienced instructional designers and presents an enhanced version of the classic ADDIE model. In the early days of the COVID-19 pandemic, Lockee and colleagues noted that emergency online learning and remote teaching present different challenges.

== Selected publications ==
- Kim, Sangkyun; Song, Kibong; Lockee, Barbara; Burton, John (2018), "What is Gamification in Learning and Education?", Gamification in Learning and Education, Cham: Springer International Publishing, pp. 25–38, doi:10.1007/978-3-319-47283-6_4, ISBN 978-3-319-47282-9
- Larson, Miriam B.; Lockee, Barbara B. (2019-11-28). Streamlined ID. Routledge. ISBN 978-0-8153-6670-6.
- Charles Hodges, Stephanie Moore, Barb Lockee, Torrey Trust and Aaron Bond Published (2020). "The Difference Between Emergency Remote Teaching and Online Learning". EDUCAUSE Review.
- Lockee, Barbara B. (2021). "Shifting digital, shifting context: (re)considering teacher professional development for online and blended learning in the COVID-19 era". Educational Technology Research and Development. 69 (1): 17–20. doi:10.1007/s11423-020-09836-8. ISSN 1042-1629. PMC 7537770. PMID 33041603.
- Lockee, Barbara B. (2021-01-25). "Online education in the post-COVID era". Nature Electronics. 4 (1): 5–6. doi:10.1038/s41928-020-00534-0. ISSN 2520-1131.

== Awards and honors ==
In 2022 Lockee received the David H. Jonassen Excellence in Research Award from the Association for Educational Communications and Technology. She was also honored by Appalachian State University with membership in the Rhododendron Society, the highest honor bestowed by the university.
