= Vicky Charisi =

Spanish researcher on human-robot interaction

- Education: National and Kapodistrian University of Athens; UCL
- Occupation: Research scientist
- Employer: Berkman Clein Center at Harvard University

Vicky Charisi (Vasiliki Charisi) is a research scientist at the Berkman Klein Centre, Harvard University, known for her work on the interaction between artificial intelligence and human behaviour.

Charisi's research focuses on the impact of artificial intelligence, and robotics on child development.

== Biography ==
=== Education ===
Charisi attended the National and Kapodistrian University of Athens, Greece, where she earned a Bachelor's Degree in Musicology. She has also earned a Master's degree in Instructional Design, Didactics, and Evaluation.

Charisi completed her PhD at UCL, Institute of Education.

=== Career ===
Charisi currently works as a research scientist for the Berkman Clein Center at Harvard University. She has been involved with the Joint Research Centre of the European Commission where she has worked on science policy for AI and children's rights, and is currently researching AL for educational purposes, and the researching the policy and industry implications of this technology.

Charisi is the Task Force Vice Chair of the IEEE Cognitive and Development Systems' Task Force on Human-Robot Interaction. This task force was established to bring together to create a network for stakeholders working on human-robot interaction in context of developmental robotics.
