= Canadian Journal of Learning and Technology =

- Discipline: Educational technology, Instructional design
- Language: English, French

Publication details
- History: 1972–present
- Publisher: Canadian Network for Innovation in Education
- Frequency: Three times a year
- Open access: Yes
- License: CC BY-NC 4.0
- Impact factor: 0.294 (2023)
- ISO 4: Find out here

Indexing
- ISSN: 1499-6677 (print); 1499-6685 (web)

Links
- Journal homepage

The Canadian Journal of Learning and Technology (CJLT; French: La revue canadienne de l'apprentissage et de la technologie) is a triannual peer-reviewed open-access academic journal covering all aspects of educational technology and learning. It is the official journal of the Canadian Network for Innovation in Education.

== History ==
The journal's roots date back to 1972 with the publication of Media Message by the Canadian Education Media Council. It was later known as the Canadian Journal of Educational Communication (CJEC) before being renamed to its current title in 2002. In 2009, it transitioned to a fully online, open-access format.

== Abstracting and indexing ==
The journal is indexed and abstracted in Scopus, Web of Science (ESCI), ERIC, and the Directory of Open Access Journals (DOAJ).
