= Charles Reigeluth =

- Born: 31 December 1946 (age 78)

Academic background
- Education: Ph.D
- Alma mater: Brigham Young University

Academic work
- Main interests: instructional design theories

Charles M. Reigeluth is an American educational theorist.

Reigeluth is an educational theorist who focuses on instructional design theories. He has a B.A. in economics from Harvard University, and a Ph.D in instructional psychology from Brigham Young University. He is a professor at the Instructional Systems Technology Department at Indiana University, and is a former chairman of the department.

Reigeluth is the creator of an instructional design system called Elaboration Theory, in which information to be learned is arranged so that simpler concepts build up to narrower and more detailed elaborations, thereby placing the content in a meaningful context. In 1999, Reigeluth edited "Instructional-Design Theories and Models, Volume II: A New Paradigm of Instructional Design (Mahwah, New Jersey: Lawrence Erlbaum Associates). Reigeluth asserted that the primary goal of instructional design is enhancing human education (1999, p. ix).

In 2001 he received a distinguished service award from the Association for Educational Communications and Technology.

Textbooks he has written include:

- Instructional Design Theories and Models, Volumes I, II and III
- Instructional Theories in Action; Instructional Design Strategies and Tactics, and Systemic Change in Education
- Comprehensive Systems Design: A New Educational Technology
