= Jerrold Kemp =

Jerrold E. Kemp (April 23, 1921 – November 26, 2015) was a researcher in the field of Instructional Design. He was the main contributor to the Kemp Instructional Design Model.

== Biography ==
Kemp was born on 23 April 1921 in New York. He served in the United States Army Air Forces from 1942–1947 as a Weather and Air Traffic Control Officer. He became a lieutenant colonel. He lived in California with his wife Edith.

Kemp was a former president of the Association for Educational Communications and Technology. He was author or co-author of five textbooks and consulted on educational projects and practices in numerous schools, universities, and agencies in foreign countries and UNESCO. Kemp was the Year 2000 Technos Press Author.

== Education and career ==
Kemp received his doctorate in instructional technology from Indiana University Bloomington. He began his career in academia at the San Jose State University as a professor of education, where he also worked as the coordinator of media production and instructional development services. He taught at San Jose State University for 30 years.

Education

University of Florida. B.S. 1942 (Chemistry major)

University of Miami, Coral Gables, Florida M.S 1952

Indiana University Bloomington D.Ed. 1956

== Research ==
The Kemp Design Model

The Kemp Model of Instructional Design is a relatively recent instructional design model explained in Kemp's book Designing Effective Instruction. It has been called a holistic approach because some believe it includes more elements into the design process. It consists of 9 elements:

1. Identify instructional problems, and specify goals for designing an instructional program.
2. Examine learner characteristics that should receive attention during planning.
3. Identify subject content, and analyze task components related to stated goals and purposes.
4. State instructional objectives for the learner.
5. Sequence content within each instructional unit for logical learning.
6. Design instructional strategies so that each learner can master the objectives.
7. Plan the instructional message and delivery.
8. Develop evaluation instruments to assess objectives.
9. Select resources to support instruction and learning activities.

Kemp's cognitive learning design model is learner-centered, thus its oval shape, and the steps are interdependent; the steps do not have to be followed in any particular order to complete the instructional learning systems design. This signifies a systems approach in which the instructional design process is a continuous cycle, while maintaining the importance on how to manage the instructional design process.

The characteristics of the model

- All elements are interdependent
- All the elements can be performed simultaneously as the model is nonlinear and flexible
- The user can start at any point in the process
- Learning needs, goals, priorities and constraints determine the instructional solutions.
- All programs or projects may not require all nine elements.

== Publication and Books ==
This book has over 1400 citations on Google Scholar:

Morrison, G. R., Ross, S. M., Kemp, J. E., & Kalman, H. (2010). Designing effective instruction. John Wiley & Sons.

Other books and publications include:

Kemp, J. E., & Cochern, G. W. (1994). Planning for Effective Technical Training: A Guide for Instructors and Trainers. Educational Technology.

Kemp, J. E. (1980). Planning and producing audiovisual materials (No. Ed. 4). Harper & Row.

Kemp, J. E. (1996). School Restructuring: Your School Can Do It!. Techtrends, 41(1), pages 12-15.

Kemp, J. E. (1971). Instructional Design; A Plan for Unit and Course Development.
