= Gerlach and Ely Instructional Design Model =

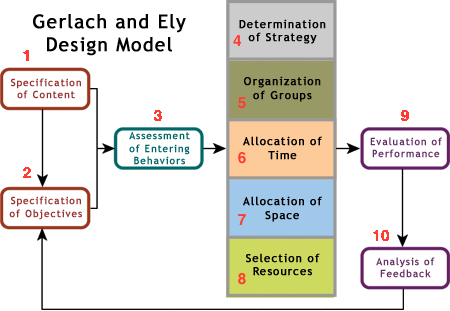
Gerlach and Ely Model

The Gerlach and Ely instructional design model emphasizes the cycle nature of instructional design.

The authors wanted to design a model which explained each component of the teaching and learning process while at the same time examining the relationship between the media and instruction. The model consists of ten elements and was constructed for teachers who both design and deliver instruction. The model is clearly defined and easily understood.

== Designers ==
The Gerlach and Ely instructional design model was developed by Vernon S. Gerlach and Donald P. Ely (1930 – 2014). Gerlach is an American Educator and writer who authored and co-authored books in the field of Education. Dr. Ely was an American professor and director of ERIC Clearinghouse on information and technology at Syracuse University. Dr. Ely also published and co-authored several journal articles and books and founded the ERIC Clearinghouse on information and technology. As an Educator, he was an advocate for instructional technology. Gerlach and Ely co-authored Teaching and the media, A systematic Approach (1971) where they introduced the Gerlach and Ely Instructional design model.

== Overview ==
The model can be described as a mix of linear and concurrent activities that contains several steps which are seen as simultaneous.

In education, the model is suitable for primary, secondary and tertiary levels and can be implemented with limited resources available to teachers. The model is most suitable for instructional planning and designing where objectives and content are predetermined. Both objectives and content are also synchronize and are the starting point of instruction. The model includes strategies for selecting and including multimedia during instruction. It is one of the few models that recognizes content orientation of many teachers. In the field of education, the model “has stood the test of time and has continued to serve the classroom teacher well”.

=== Steps in the model ===
Step One

- Specification of Content
- Specification of Objectives

Step Two

- Assessment of Entering Behavior

Step Three

- Determination of Strategy
- Organization of Groups
- Allocation of Time
- Allocation of Space
- Selection of Resources

Step Four

- Evaluation of Performance

Step Five

- Analysis of Feedback

==== Step One ====
The first task of the Gerlach and Ely instructional design model is the specification of content and objectives. This is done simultaneously since both content and objectives interact with each other. It is essential that the teacher indicates the reason for teaching the specific content and the medium in which the content will be used to achieve the objectives. The teacher is responsible for selecting the area of content to be taught and determining when it should be taught

The content is selected from the curriculum. The teacher also takes into consideration the state/local guidelines, personal experiences, goal or preferences of supervisor. The objectives must be measurable and written as specific skills that learners should display under specific conditions and time.

==== Step Two ====
The second step is the assessment of entering behavior. At this stage, the teacher needs to determine the present skills and prerequisite knowledge of learners. Gerlach and Ely (1980) explained that the teacher must ask the question, "To what extent has the student learned the terms, concepts and skills which are part of the course?" The teacher can determine the starting knowledge of each learner by using a variety of methods such as giving a pretes). Gerlach and Ely were advocates of pretesting; they believed that teachers should breakdown content into units and give learners a pretest at the beginning of each unit.

===== Step Three =====
In this model there are five tasks which occurs simultaneously:

- Determination of strategy: The teacher determines a teaching strategy through the process of deciding how much information should be used and the roles of the teacher and the students in the learning process. The choice of strategy range from the traditional, expository to the inquiry approach.
- Organization of groups: The learners may work independently, in pairs or in groups. The group size is dependent on the task to be completed. The organization of groups is also dependent on objectives and materials used for delivering the content.
- Allocation of time: Time allocation is dependent on the class period and the organization of group activity.
- Allocation of space: This is dependent on the task to be performed and whether or not the space is available during the time of instruction. The teacher can utilize not only the classroom but also the school's lab, gym or even outdoor facilities.
- Selection of Resources: The selection of resources is based on the objectives of the lesson. Materials are not considered resources until there is a meaningful context for their use. The teacher must consider whether available resources can be adopted to fulfil learning objectives. The model also suggests that teachers should seek out resources from existing ones rather than developing new resources.

===== Step four =====
The fourth step in this model is the evaluation of performance. Evaluation of performance is focused on the measurement of students’ performance and the attitude of students towards the content. In other words, the teacher must determine the effectiveness and efficiency of the instruction.

====== Step Five ======
The final step in the model is the analysis of feed back. A formative revision is done to complete the process. At this point the teacher will inform the students about their performance.

== See also ==
- Instructional Design
- ADDIE Model
- Instructional Technology
- Communication Theory
- Learning Theory

== Sources ==
- Keengwe, Jared; Agamba, Joachim Jack (2015). Models for Improving and Optimizing Online and Blended Learning in Higher Education. IGI Global. doi:10.4018/978-1-4666-6280-3. ISBN 978-1-4666-6280-3.
- Gustafson, Kent L.; Branch, Robert Maribe (2002). Survey of Instructional Development Models. Fourth Edition. ISBN 978-0-937597-55-2. ERIC ED477517.
- Grabowski, Sarah (27 February 2003). "Teaching & Media: A Systematic Approach: The Gerlach & Ely Model" (PDF).
- Ledford, Bruce R; Sleeman, Phillip J (2000). Instructional design: a primer. Information Age Pub. ISBN 978-1-60752-713-8. OCLC 698587585.
- Morrison, Gary R.; Ross, Steven J.; Morrison, Jennifer R.; Kalman, Howard K. (2019). Designing Effective Instruction. John Wiley & Sons. ISBN 978-1-119-46593-5.
