= J. Michael Spector =

American academic

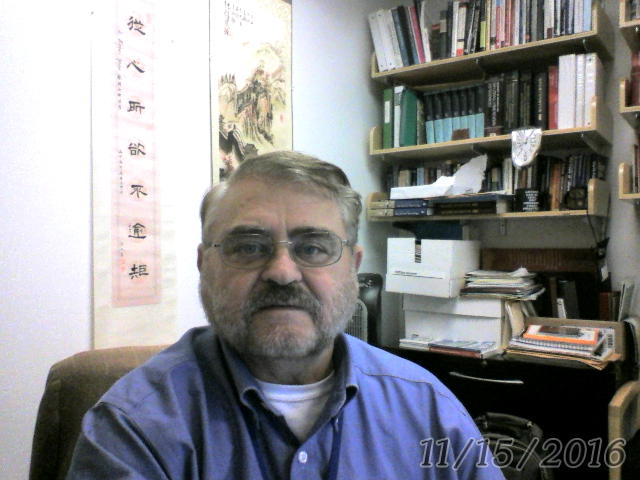
- Born: Jonathan Michael Spector; Pensacola, Florida, U.S.
- Education: United States Air Force Academy (BS); University of Texas at Austin (PhD)
- Scientific career
- Fields: Educational technology
- Institutions: University of North Texas; University of Georgia; Florida State University

Jonathan Michael Spector is an American academic working as the professor of learning technologies and the doctoral program coordinator at the University of North Texas. He was previously professor of educational psychology at the University of Georgia and instructional systems at Florida State University.

== Early life and education ==
Spector was born in Pensacola, Florida. He earned a Bachelor of Science degree in international affairs from the United States Air Force Academy in 1967 and a PhD in philosophy from the University of Texas at Austin in 1978.(subscription required)

== Career ==
Spector's research focuses on intelligent support for instructional design, assessing learning in complex domains, and technology integration in education. He has authored over 150 publications in the field of educational technology and edited the Handbook of Research on Educational Communications and Technology and the Encyclopedia of Educational Technology. He has been a visiting professor at several universities in China, India, and Malaysia and was a Fulbright research scholar at the University of Bergen. He was a past president of the Association for Educational Communications and Technology.

== Publications ==
- Lin, Lin; Spector, J. Michael (July 2017). The Sciences of Learning and Instructional Design. Routledge. p. 231. ISBN 978-1138924314.
- Spector, J. Michael (June 2015). Foundations of Educational Technology. Routledge. ISBN 978-1138790278.

== See also ==
- PALM Center
