= Robert F. Mager =

American psychologist and author (1923–2020)

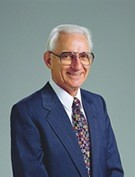
- Born: June 10, 1923; Cleveland, Ohio, U.S.
- Died: May 11, 2020 (aged 96)
- Education: Ohio University: B.A. and M.A. Psychology; State University of Iowa: Ph.D. in Experimental Psychology
- Known for: Learning objectives Criterion Referenced Instruction (CRI); Self-paced multimedia courses
- Notable work: Preparing instructional objectives

Robert Frank Mager [meɪgɜ:] (June 10, 1923 – May 23, 2020) was an American psychologist and author. Concerned with understanding and improving human performance, he is known for developing a framework for preparing learning objectives, and criterion referenced instruction (CRI), as well as addressing areas of goal orientation, student evaluation, student motivation, classroom environment, educational change, performance technology, and instructional design.

== Personal life / biography ==
Robert Frank Mager was born in the summer of 1923 shortly before The Great Depression. As any other little boy, Mager had aspirations of becoming a fireman, policeman, detective, cowboy and even a rocketship pilot. Mager was picked-on in school. This was as a result of him being skipped from fourth grade to sixth grade. This made him one of the smallest in his class. To add insult to injury, in his time, being left-handed was considered a heinous act and often resulted in a sharp rap on the knuckles. Subsequently, Mager switched to writing with his right-hand.

Music also formed part of Mager's explorations as he jumped from one instrument to the other. At one time he played the violin, then the clarinet and even the saxophone. Eventually he found ‘his love’ the banjo, and has even been part of a banjo band. Mager's ‘true love’ his wife, is a professional classical musician.

He died in May 2020 at the age of 96.

=== Drafted into the Army ===
In his book, Life in the Pinball Machine: Careening from There to Here, Mager makes an analogy of his life to a pinball. He likened his life as the ball and the different experiences in his lives as the pins of machine that would bump and jostle him eventually to his current research in the Instructional Design field. One such experience occurred in 1943 when Mager was drafted into the military. One of his initial responsibilities was that of a company clerk which involved him interacting with new recruits. Mager was able to observe discrepancies with performances due to lack of information.

=== Today ===
Mager is credited with revolutionizing the performance improvement industry with his groundbreaking work, the Criterion Referenced Instruction (CRI) framework.

=== Other interests ===
Over the years, Mager had also been an accomplished unicyclist, banjo player, ventriloquist, crime novelist, and tap dancer.

== Education and academic career ==
After serving in World War II, Mager completed his undergraduate studies in Psychology with minors in Philosophy and Speech at Ohio University (1948), then taught broadcasting techniques and business speech at Tyler Commercial College while studying Electronics there, and studied Radio Broadcasting at the CBS School (NYU campus, 1948). He completed graduate studies (A.B and M.A. degrees) in Psychology at Ohio University in 1950, and taught psychology there the following year, before moving on to completing his PhD in Experimental Psychology at State University of Iowa in 1954. He also taught psychology at Sacramento State College in 1958–59. He served as research scientist for the Human Resources Research Office.

== Research ==
=== Instructional sequencing ===
In the early 1960s Mager created a small experiment to determine what instructional sequence would be logical and meaningful for adult learners and compared this to the usual instructor-led sequence of instruction. The findings he reported in On the sequencing of instructional content, suggested that instruction led by the learner takes on a different sequence from that led by an instructor, it allowed them to take their own knowledge into account and resulted in a more motivated learner. Further experiments and research on this subject by Mager and his colleagues led to the concept of learner-control as a method which when introduced to technology-assisted instruction was found to improve learning performance. This has been a key concept in self-paced multimedia courses and has influenced distance and online learning.

=== Learning objectives ===
In 1962 Preparing objectives for programmed instruction Mager pioneered a new approach to instructional design which involved establishing objectives for instruction. This made such an impact that in later editions as Preparing Instructional Objectives it became, it could be said, the manual for preparing instruction because of its clearly outlined steps on how to define objectives. It so revolutionized instructional methods in schools that a bill was passed in California that required teachers to describe what they wanted their students to achieve (i.e., behavioral outcomes) by writing these as objectives (the Stull Act, 1972).

=== Goal analysis ===
Mager found that establishing objectives could easily be misused, and went further to formulate five steps that would clearly guide the process of defining solid and measurable outcomes. This resulted in the publication Goal analysis in 1972, which became a cornerstone of the CRI method and ensuing workshops.

=== Criterion Referenced Instruction (CRI) ===
Mager along with Peter Pipe is well known for developing the Criterion Referenced Instruction (CRI) a framework for Instructional Design. The origins of Instructional Design dated back as early as World War II with the need for creating training programs. Mager had firsthand experience with these training regimes. However, he found that they were not meeting the goals that they were set out to meet. From this phenomenon, Mager went about seeking ways to improve training delivery. These experiences led Mager to publish his work in a book later titled, Preparing Instructional Objectives: A Critical Tool in the Development of Effective Instruction.

In his publications, Mager usually starts out with a fable. In this book the fable is about a sea-horse which went out seeking a fortune. Unfortunately, the sea horse got side-tracked by the different sea creatures he met along the way and eventually ended up being swallowed by a shark. The moral of the fable :if you're not sure where you're going, you're liable to end up some place else. Consequently, in his book, Mager speaks of the importance of knowing precisely what is needed to be achieved before embarking on any instructional design process.

The CRI framework is based upon using objectives (instructional objectives) to drive instruction. Effective Instructional objectives should have three components:

1. Performance - Identifies specifically what the learner should be able to do after the instruction
2. Condition - Identifies the conditions under which the performance is to occur - upon what ("the mission field"), with/without what support ("given ...")
3. Criterion - Describes how well the learner must perform in order to be acceptable

The CRI is divided into four stages.

1. The Goal/task Analysis - The specific competencies that are needed are identified.
2. Performance Objectives - The criterion, this provides clear cut outcomes as well as states how they would be evaluated.
3. Criterion Referenced Testing - The actual evaluation that will be used to test whether or not the performance objectives were carried out to the required standard.Criterion-referenced test
4. Learning modules - Involves the development of the actual modules that would be used in the training/instruction.

This instructional framework is designed in such a way that students are expected to gain mastery in the specific modules by evaluating themselves using assessment tools built into the program.

Mager was influenced by the works of Robert M. Gagné and Malcolm Knowles.

== Professional associations ==
- One of the founders of International Society for Performance Improvement (ISPI) in 1962, originally known as National Society for Programmed Instruction (NSPI), and was its president in 1965–66.
- Member of the Institute of Electronic and Electrical Engineers (IEEE).

== Publications ==
Robert F. Mager is the author of over 10 books which have been translated into at least 17 languages and sold over four million copies worldwide in the past five decades. His Preparing Instructional Objectives is the best-selling book ever written on the subject, and is part of the Museum of Education's books of the century list. His main publications are characterized by an easy-to-read writing style and humor, which is much unlike other academic writings in the field.

Mager has also written the materials for the three workshops he was responsible for, i.e., the Criterion-referenced Instruction, the Instructional Module Development, and the Training Manager workshops. In latter years he has taken up fiction writing and has published 7 novels and two anthologies to date.

=== Non-fiction ===
- Beach, K.M., & Mager, R.F. (1976). Developing Vocational Instruction. London: Financial Times Prentice Hall.
- Mager, R.F. (1973). Measuring Instructional Intent; Or, Got a Match?. Atlanta, GA: The Center for Effective Performance Inc.
- Mager, R.F. (1983). Troubleshooting the Troubleshooting Course, Or, Debug D'Bugs. Atlanta, GA: The Center for Effective Performance Inc.
- Mager, R.F. (1984). Developing Attitude Toward Learning (2nd ed.). Atlanta, GA: The Center for Effective Performance Inc.
- Mager, R.F. (1986). The How to Write a Book Book. Atlanta, GA: The Center for Effective Performance Inc.
- Mager, R.F., & Pipe, P. (1997). Analyzing Performance Problems: Or, You Really Oughta Wanna--How to Figure out Why People Aren't Doing What They Should Be, and What to do About It (3rd ed.). Atlanta, GA: The Center for Effective Performance Inc.
- Mager, R.F. (1997). Goal Analysis: How to Clarify Your Goals So You Can Actually Achieve Them (3rd ed.). Atlanta, GA: The Center for Effective Performance Inc.
- Mager, R.F. (1997). How to Turn Learners On... Without Turning Them Off: Ways to Ignite Interest in Learning (3rd ed.). Atlanta, GA: The Center for Effective Performance Inc.
- Mager, R.F. (1997). Making Instruction Work: Or Skillbloomers: A Step-By-Step Guide to Designing and Developing Instruction That Works (2nd ed.). Atlanta, GA: The Center for Effective Performance Inc.
- Mager, R.F. (1997). Measuring Instructional Results. (3rd ed.). Atlanta, GA: The Center for Effective Performance Inc.
- Mager, R.F. (1997). Preparing Instructional Objectives: A Critical Tool in the Development of Effective Instruction (3rd ed.). Atlanta, GA: The Center for Effective Performance Inc.
- Mager, R.F. (1999). What Every Manager Should Know About Training: An Insider's Guide to Getting Your Money's Worth From Training (2nd ed.). Atlanta, GA: The Center for Effective Performance Inc.
- Mager, R.F. (2014). Making Schools Work. Carefree, AZ: Mager Associates, Inc.

=== Biographical chronicle ===
- Mager, R.F. (2003, 2012). Life in the Pinball Machine: Careening from There to Here ... Observations from an Accidental Life in Learning and Human Performance. Carefree, AZ: Mager Associates, Inc.

=== Fiction ===
- (2001) Mager’s Shorts: Stories, that is: Bedtime Stories for the Fearless Reader.
- (2002) Killer in our midst.
- (2005) Dying for jade.
- (2006) The reluctant miracle man.
- (2007) The price of a miracle: A novel.
- (2008) Pursuing the steamy novel.
- (2009) Mager’s shorts II: Quirky stories for the adventurous reader.
- (2010) Shen: The chronicles of Madame Woo.
- (2011) The bitch file.

== Workshops ==
- Criterion-Referenced Instruction (with Peter Pipe)
- Instructional Module Development
- The Training Director Workshop

== Awards ==
- Thomas F. Gilbert Distinguished Professional Achievement Award - 1994
- Award for Public Service in Behavior Analysis - 2005
- ASTD award for distinguished contribution to human resource development
