= The Knirk & Gustafson Instructional Design Model =

The Knirk & Gustafson Instructional Design Model is an instructional model that was developed by Frederick G. Knirk and Kent L. Gustafson in 1986. Their model has three stages:

- Problem determination
- Design
- Development

Knirk is an author in the field of education and instructional design and Gustafson was a professor at the University of Georgia

== Stages ==
=== Problem Determination ===
The Problem determination stage focuses on two processes: the identification of the problem, the performance gaps and the primary goals (Pappas, 2015), and the setting of goals (Sortrakul & Denphaisarn, 2009).

This stage allows the instructional designer to conduct a needs assessment and task analysis to determine the objectives that are required to solve the problem and create general instructional goals (Nimbkar & Sonali, 2013) as well as decide which methods are suitable to lessen a performance deficiency (Barbazette, 2006). Determining the Learner’s Entry Behavior is critical to this process as it relates to the knowledge base of the learner, their communication skills, their learning styles and their health and wellbeing (Nimbkar & Sonali, 2013). It also highlights the issues to be addressed via the needs assessment and task analysis (Pappas, 2015).

Finally, the Problem Determination stage aids in the organization of instructional development, by planning, organizing, coordinating, evaluating and reporting on the results of the aforesaid assessments and analysis (Nimbkar & Sonali, 2013) in order to pick a suitable method for design.

=== Design ===
The Design Stage focuses on the development of objectives and strategies (Sortrakul & Denphaisarn, 2009) to solve the problem highlighted in the problem determination stage. Along with aforesaid choices, suitable activities, materials and multimedia components are needed to resolve the problem and seal the performance gap (Pappas, 2015) (Nimbkar & Sonali, 2013).

These objectives may follow the ABCD model while being terminal and enabling (Nimbkar & Sonali, 2013). It is important to consult Subject Matter Experts in the selection and gathering of media, the refining of objectives among other designing processes (Pappas, 2015).

=== Development ===
The Development Stage entails the creation and development of training materials, conducting of tests by users and the making of essential improvements towards the final product (Pappas, 2015). The creation of materials is normally a result of unsuitable ones that may be existence (Sortrakul & Denphaisarn, 2009), and even the new models require evaluation for the situation (Nimbkar & Sonali, 2013).

Prototyping and focus groups may be necessary to produce an efficient and effective result (Pappas, 2015) as it going to a series of analysis before the official implementation (Nimbkar & Sonali, 2013).

== Advantages and disadvantages of model ==
=== Advantages ===
The Knirk and Gustafson Instructional Design Model has a simplistic design as it is done in three main phases (İşman, Çağlar, Dabaj, & Ersözlü, 2005). However, the model can be used successfully by the experts and beginners alike. The Hannifin and Peck Model also uses three phases but does not have separate phases (Pappas, 2015) as it constantly uses an evaluation and revision phases though the three phases (Qureshi, 2004). This makes the Hannifin and Peck model unsuitable for beginners but maintains a focus on the core functions like the Knirk and Gustafson model (Qureshi, 2004).

Also, the Knirk and Gustafson model is effective for the planning and implementation of unit and lesson plans (Kowalski, 2012). Additionally, itl provides the user opportunities along every phase of this model to remedy organization-wide problems, to reduce the skills gap in learners, and to meet the learners' instructional needs (Pappas, 2015).

=== Disadvantages ===
According to the Online Academic Community of the University of Victoria, (UVIC) the Knirk and Gustafson Instructional Design Model is excellent in simplicity but it misses steps of revision and evaluation during the beginning and intermediate steps. As such, when revision may become necessary in the implementation, one may have to review the former steps to produce an effective result (Kowalski, 2012).

Secondly, UVIC highlights the model's inability to consider the student’s learning style and behavioural traits in the problem identification stage. The identification of the aforementioned factors will aid in the development of an appropriate solution.

Lastly, UVIC points out that although the each stage is independent, a cross-related design would have made the process better as it would promote continued inter-relations between the processes and the content to be designed.

== Applications of model ==
The UVIC see the Knirk and Gustafson model as an effective and efficient for short courses that requires little consistency. Additionally, the instructional design model is suitable for the eLearning platform where media and technology are heavily involved (Pappas, 2015). Finally, this model’s is excellent for simulations in the learning design field (Sortrakul & Denphaisarn, 2009).
