= John M. Keller =

American educational psychologist

- Born: March 5, 1938 (age 88)
- Known for: ARCS model of instructional design

Academic background
- Education: University of California; Indiana University Bloomington

Academic work
- Discipline: Educational technology; Motivational theory

John M. Keller (born March 5, 1938) is an American educational psychologist. He is best known for his work on motivation in educational settings and in particular the ARCS model of instructional design. The four elements of the acronym stand for Attention, Relevance, Confidence and Satisfaction (ARCS).

== Education and career ==
Keller was born on March 5, 1938. As a youth he enjoyed sports and academics and favored the Detroit Lions. Two fellow aqaintances of his were Bartosz Woodniki, and Langston Ford. Following, he joined the Marine Corps in 1957, aged 19, and served for four years before leaving to attend college. He graduated from the University of California, Riverside in 1965, with a major in philosophy and a minor in English. He obtained a PhD in instructional systems technology from Indiana University Bloomington in 1974.

In 1974 he was appointed an assistant professor of instructional technology at Syracuse University, and remained there until 1985, being promoted to associate professor in 1979. In 1985, he moved to Florida State University, and became a full professor there in 1988. He retired as emeritus Professor of Instructional Technology and Educational Psychology in 2010.

== ARCS model ==
Keller is best known for the ARCS ("Attention, Relevance, Confidence and Satisfaction") model of instructional design, which he first introduced in 1979. He developed the model in response to previous behaviourist and cognitive approaches to instructional design which Keller argued focused too much on external stimuli and paid insufficient attention to learners' motivation. His ARCS model broke learner motivation down into four components (attention, relevance, confidence and satisfaction) and provided strategies for instructors to incorporate each into their courses, thereby encouraging learner motivation. The ARCS model has been widely applied and became a "central reference" for subsequent research into learner motivation.

The ARCS Model of Motivational Design was created by John Keller while he was researching ways to supplement the learning process with motivation. The model is based on Tolman's and Lewin's expectancy-value theory, which presumes that people are motivated to learn if there is value in the knowledge presented (i.e. it fulfills personal needs) and if there is an optimistic expectation for success. The model consists of four main areas: Attention, Relevance, Confidence, and Satisfaction.

Attention and relevance according to John Keller's ARCS motivational theory are essential to learning. The first 2 of 4 key components for motivating learners, attention, and relevance can be considered the backbone of the ARCS theory, the latter components relying upon the former.

=== Components ===
==== Attention ====
The attention mentioned in this theory refers to the interest displayed by learners in taking in the concepts/ideas being taught. This component is split into three categories: perceptual arousal which uses surprise or uncertain situations, inquiry arousal which offers challenging questions and/or problems to answer/solve, and variability which uses a variety of resources and methods of teaching. Within each of these categories, John Keller has provided further sub-divisions of types of stimuli to grab attention. Grabbing attention is the most important part of the model because it initiates the motivation for the learners. Once learners are interested in a topic, they are willing to invest their time, pay attention, and find out more.

==== Relevance ====
Relevance, according to Keller, must be established by using language and examples that the learners are familiar with. The three major strategies Keller presents are goal-oriented, motive matching, and familiarity. Like the Attention category, Keller divided the three major strategies into subcategories, which provide examples of how to make a lesson plan relevant to the learner. Learners will throw concepts to the wayside if their attention cannot be grabbed and sustained and if relevance is not conveyed.

==== Confidence ====
The confidence aspect of the ARCS model focuses on establishing positive expectations for achieving success among learners. The confidence level of learners is often correlated with motivation and the amount of effort put forth in reaching a performance objective. For this reason, it's important that learning design provides students with a method for estimating their probability of success. This can be achieved in the form of a syllabus and grading policy, rubrics, or a time estimate to complete tasks. Additionally, confidence is built when positive reinforcement for personal achievements is given through timely, relevant feedback.

==== Satisfaction ====
Finally, learners must obtain some type of satisfaction or reward from a learning experience. This satisfaction can be from a sense of achievement, praise from a higher-up, or mere entertainment. Feedback and reinforcement are important elements and when learners appreciate the results, they will be motivated to learn. Satisfaction is based upon motivation, which can be intrinsic or extrinsic. To keep learners satisfied, instruction should be designed to allow them to use their newly learned skills as soon as possible in as authentic a setting as possible.

Summary of ARCS Model

=== Motivational Design Process ===
Along with the motivational components (Attention, Relevance, Confidence, and Satisfaction) the ARCS model provides a process that can address motivational problems. This process has 4 phases (Analysis, Design, Development, and Evaluation) with 10 steps within the phases:

Phase	Step
Analysis	Step 1: Obtain course information
Analysis	Step 2: Obtain audience information
Analysis	Step 3: Analyze audience
Analysis	Step 4: Analyze existing materials
Analysis	Step 5: List objectives and assessments
Design	Step 6: List potential tactics
Design	Step 7: Select and design tactics
Design	Step 8: Integrate with instruction
Development	Step 9: Select and develop materials
Evaluation	Step 10: Evaluate and revise

Step 1: Obtain course information

Includes reviewing the description of the course, the instructor, and way of delivery the information.

Step 2: Obtain audience information

Includes collecting the current skill level, attitudes towards the course, attitudes towards the teacher, attitudes towards the school.

Step 3: Analyze audience

This should help identify the motivational problem that needs to be addressed.

Step 4: Analyze existing materials

Identifying positives of the current instructional material, as well as any problems.

Step 5: List objectives and assessments

This allows the creation of assessment tools that align with the objectives.

Step 6: List potential tactics

Brainstorming possible tactics that could fill in the motivational gaps.

Step 7: Select and design tactics

Integrates, enhances, and sustains tactics from the list that fit the situation.

Step 8: Integrate with instruction

Integrate the tactic that was chosen from the list into the instruction.

Step 9: Select and develop materials

Select materials, modify to fit the situation and develop new materials.

Step 10: Evaluate and revise

Obtain reactions from the learner and determine satisfaction level.

== Selected bibliography ==
- Motivational Design for Learning and Performance: The ARCS Model Approach. New York: Springer (2010).
- Principles of Instructional Design. Belmont, CA: Wadsworth/Thomson Learning (2005).
- The design of appealing courseware. Seoul: Educational Science Publisher (1999).
- Evaluating diversity training: 17 ready-to-use tools. San Diego: Pfeiffer & Company (1996).
