= PALM Center =

Research institute at Florida State University

PALM Center: Partnerships Advancing Library Media
- Type: Research Institute
- Established: 2006
- Director: Dr. Nancy Everhart
- Academic staff: Dr. Marcia Mardis, Dr.Wayne Wiegand
- Location: Tallahassee, Florida, United States
- Affiliations: Florida State University, College of Communication and Information Learning Systems Institute, College of Education,
- Website: www.palmcenter.fsu.edu
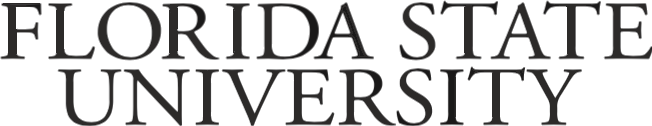

The Partnerships Advancing Library Media (PALM) Center is a research institute at Florida State University (FSU) in Tallahassee, Florida, United States. The center was established as a joint effort of the FSU Learning Systems Institute, College of Communication and Information and the College of Education. The Center engages in research and evaluation focused on school librarians ranging from large-scale surveys and evaluation of program implementation, to case studies of school libraries.

== History ==
In January 2008, a new research institute, the Interdisciplinary Center for leadership, Technology Integration and Critical Literacies (I-CELTIC) was created as a cooperative Founding director Dr. Eliza T. Dresang said I-CELTIC's purpose was "to model and encourage innovative leadership practice and bring school libraries to the table along with all other disciplines". Dresang founded and managed the center along with CI faculty members Dr. Nancy Everhart, Dr. Wayne Wiegand, and College of Education faculty member Dr. J. Michael Spector. In June 2008 the name of I-CELTIC was changed to the PALM (Partnerships advancing Library Media) Center when Dr. Nancy Everhart became the Director following Dresang's departure to the University of Washington. Dr. Marcia Mardis became an Associate Director in January 2009.

The PALM Center is one of several centers under the jurisdiction of the Learning Systems Institute at Florida State University.

In May 2010, Dr. Everhart and Dr. Mardis were featured in the School Library Journal cover story, "Up, Up, and Away: How a group of researchers is reinventing school libraries". The article highlights their work on Project LEAD (Leaders Educated to Make a Difference), and several projects that the on which the PALM Center is currently working. The article highlights the work of the PALM Center as well as two other school library research centers - CISSL (Center for International Scholarship in School Libraries at Rutgers University and the Center for Digital Literacy at Syracuse University.

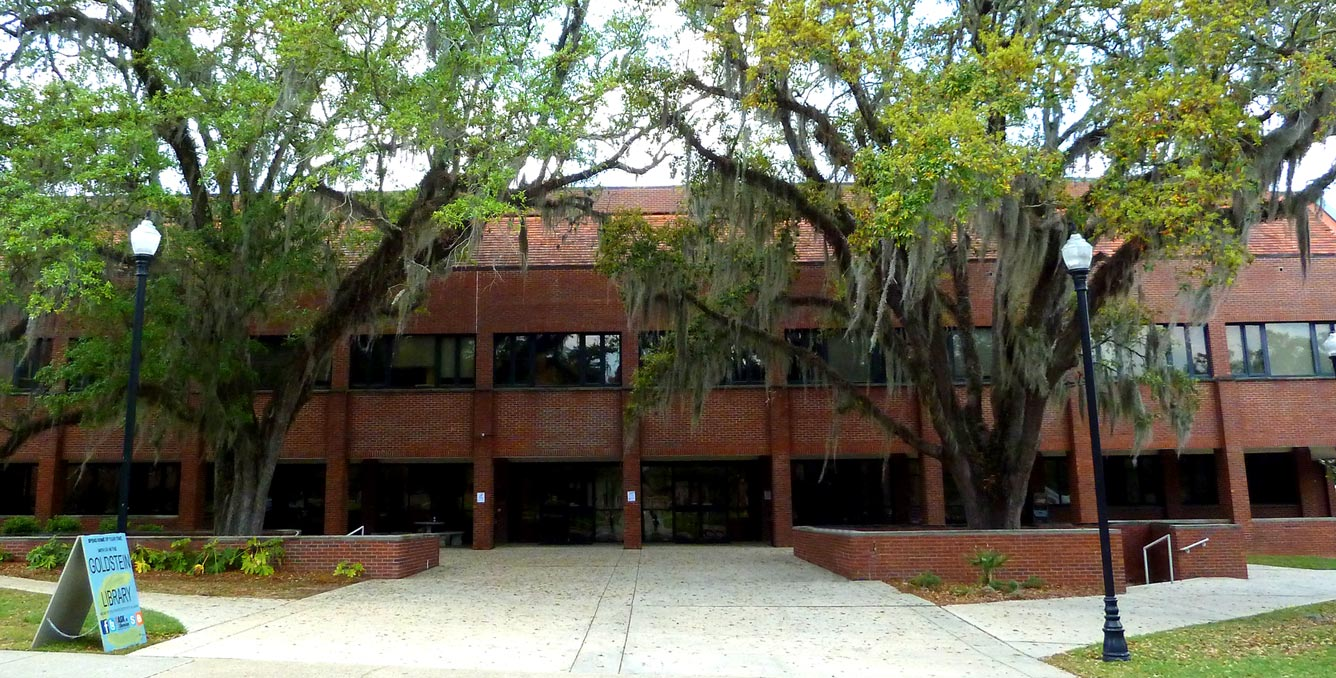
Louis Shores Building, home of the College of Communication & Information

== Location ==
The PALM Center is part of the Florida State University College of Communication and Information.

The main office location is: School of Library & Information Studies, 008 Louis Shores Building, Florida State University, Tallahassee, FL 32306

== Mission statement ==
The Center's Mission Statement was established shortly after its founding. "The Center will conduct nationally and internationally-recognized interdisciplinary research at the intersection of transformational leadership, technology integration and critical literacies - adding value and modeling practices that create positive differences in youth and adult learning outcomes."

== Research ==
Since its founding, the PALM Center has garnered over 6 million dollars in research grant funding.

=== Learning Systems Institute Projects ===
iCPALMS

A Portal for Standards-based Instruction - The Integrated Curriculum Planning and Learning Management System (iCPALMS) will provide a widget-based portal pathway into content, services, professional development, research and dissemination that will result in a scalable, sustainable infrastructure to support individual and collaborative standards-driven instructional planning with K-12 resources from the National Science Digital Library. Funded by the National Science Foundation, this grant is a collaboration of two LSI centers, the PALM Center and The Florida Center for Research in Science, Technology, Engineering and Mathematics, along with key partners ($2.5 million).

=== Palm Center Projects ===
Leadership in Action - A three-year study (August 2008 to March 2013) of school librarians’ leadership in technology integration funded by the Institute of Museum and Library Services. ($754,000).

Project LEAD - This initiative, which ran from August 2005 to July 2008, was composed of two projects that resulted in a leadership curriculum for school librarians. The curriculum, based on the National Board for Professional Teaching Standards, was implemented with 30 teacher-leaders. Continuing research is being conducted on graduates’ leadership. The project was funded by the Institute of Museum and Library Services ($2.2 million).

Digital Library to School Libraries (DL2SL) - A three-year study of the development, deployment and implementation of push technology and professional development for the integration of digital learning objects into online catalog software and learning experiences funded by a grant from the Institute of Museum and Library Services (IMLS). For more information, read the project profile on the IMLS website ($401,000).

Successfully Teaching Educators about Primary Sources - Funded by a grant by the Library of Congress, this project focuses on the design, implementation and assessment of a collaborative model for professional development that focuses on integrating the Library’s over 16 million primary sources into the curriculum. The project is a collaborative effort of the University of Central Florida College of Education, the Florida Association for Media in Education, the Florida Association of Supervisors of Media, the Florida Department of State’s Division of Library and Information Services, the PALM Center and school districts throughout Florida. The goal is to provide professional development resources, reproducible lesson plans and K-12 teaching materials that further the work of the Library of Congress’ Teaching with Primary Sources initiative. The project runs from September 2010 to June 2012 ($300,000).

== Publications ==
From District to Desktop: Making the Most of Broadband in Florida, a white paper published by the PALM Center, discusses the important issues relating to broadband, the ARRA (American Recovery and Reinvestment Act) and school library media centers in Florida. The White Paper notes that the dramatic increase in Internet use in schools in more than 10 years since the adoption of the federal E-rate connectivity assistance program has resulted in many positive educational benefits, some of which are improved student achievement, attendance, and graduation rates, as well as decreased dropout rates. But “if all students are to realize these outcomes, equitable high-speed Internet and broadband access is critical.”

From Paper to Pixel: Digital Textbooks in Schools explores "all types of digital textbooks and weigh[s] the benefits and drawbacks of each format for schools. We examine the advantages and challenges of the growing use of digital textbooks and make recommendations for school librarians’ roles in the digital textbook implementation process."

== Other Activities ==
School Libraries Worldwide - SLW is an international research journal about school librarianship co-edited and managed by PALM Center director Dr. Nancy Everhart and Dr. Marcia Mardis.
