= Christopher Dede =

American educator

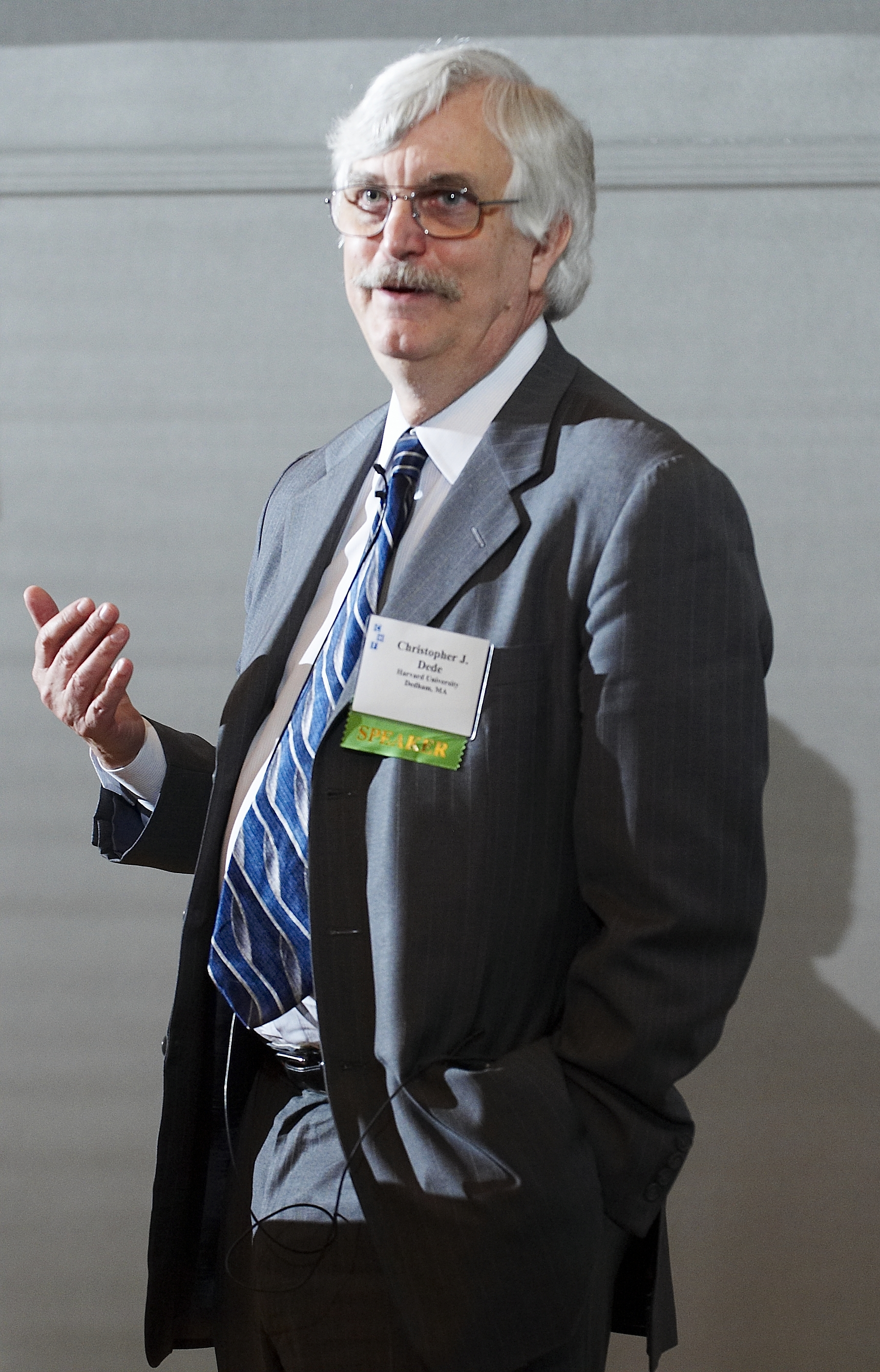
Photograph of Christopher Dede, speaker at LISE 2008 (Leadership Initiative in Science Education, 8th Annual Conference), "New Media and Technology in Science Education", April 28–29, 2008, organized by the Chemical Heritage Foundation.

Christopher 'Chris' Dede (born 1947), is an educational researcher and the Timothy E. Wirth Professor in Learning Technologies at the Harvard Graduate School of Education. His expertise includes emerging technologies, policy and leadership in education. He has been noted as one of the main contributors to the emergence of educational technology in the 2000s and 2010s and has received awards for his research from the American Educational Research Association, the Association for Teacher Educators, and the Association for Educational Communications and Technology.

== Biography ==
Christopher Dede earned a B.S. in chemistry and English from the California Institute of Technology in 1969 and a doctorate in science education from the University of Massachusetts Amherst in 1972, where he became an assistant professor after graduation. In 1974, he moved to the University of Houston-Clear Lake, being promoted to full professor in 1981, before moving further to George Mason University in 1991. Since 2000, Dede has been the Timothy E. Wirth Professor in Learning Technologies at Harvard University's Graduate School of Education, where he chaired the Learning & Teaching department in 2001–04. Additionally, he has been a policy fellow at the National Institute of Education and a senior program director at the National Science Foundation as well as a visiting scientist at NASA's Johnson Space Center and at MIT's Computer Science Lab.

== Research ==
Christopher Dede's research interests include emerging technologies for learning and assessment in education, the scaling up of technology use in education, educational policy, and leadership in educational innovation. In his research, Dede has argued that immersion in a digital environment can enhance education by allowing multiple perspectives, situated learning and transfer through simulation of reality. Together with Matt Dunleavy and Rebecca Mitchell, he has studied the potentials and pitfalls of the use of augmented reality in teaching and learning.

== Honors and awards ==
In 2011, Chris Dede was named a fellow of the American Educational Research Association. He has received awards from the Society for Information Technology in Teacher Education (2010), the Association for Educational Communications and Technology (2011), the Association for Teacher Educators (2012) and the Center for Digital Education (2016).

== Bibliography (selected) ==
- Dede, C., Honan, J.P., Peters, L.C. (2005, eds.). Scaling Up Success: Lessons Learned from Technology-Based Educational Improvement. San Francisco, CA: Jossey-Bass.
- Dede, C. (2006). Online Professional Development for Teachers: Emerging Models and Methods. Cambridge, MA: Harvard education Press.
- Dede, C., Richards, J. (2012, eds.). Digital Teaching Platforms: Customizing Classroom Learning for Each Student. New York: Teachers College Press.
