= David H. Jonassen =

American educational reformer (1947–2012)

- Born: September 14, 1947; Salem, New Jersey, U.S.
- Died: December 2, 2012 (aged 65); Columbia, Missouri, U.S.

Education
- Education: University of Delaware; Temple University

Philosophical work
- Era: 20th-century philosophy
- School: Educational psychology
- Institutions: Penn State University; University of Colorado; University of North Carolina; University of Missouri
- Main interests: Philosophy of education, Constructivism, Cognitive flexibility, Constructivist teaching methods
- Notable ideas: Learning with media and technology Mindtools

David Jonassen (September 14, 1947 – December 2, 2012) was an educational reformer whose ideas have been influential in instructional design and educational technology. Although Jonassen is best known for his publications about constructivism, he also wrote about computer-based technologies in education and learning with media as a 'mindtool', not from it.

== Life and works ==
While attending the University of Delaware, he acquired a job as a television cameraman, which led to his interest in educational media, particularly how media technology affected instruction. He changed careers to become an academic and held professorships at Penn State University, the University of Colorado, Denver, and the University of North Carolina, Greensboro. From 2000 until his death he was professor of learning technologies and educational psychology at the University of Missouri. He was named University of Missouri curators' professor in 2010. The title of curators' professor is a high honor for professors at Missouri. In his work, he became a leader in media and technology theories in instructional design by pairing it with constructivism learning theory. Jonassen was selected to become a Fellow of the American Educational Research Association and was the first recipient of the AECT’s David H. Jonassen Award for Excellence in Research, an award established in his honor. He died on December 2nd, 2012, at the age of 65.

== Constructivism ==
Jonassen was interested in media in learning and theorized that students learn "with media, not from media" and are in control of their learning, merging constructivism with educational technology. Constructivism is founded on the idea that learning is an active process of exploration from multiple perspectives, resulting in knowledge being constructed from a personal interpretation of the experience. Jonassen believed this requires the learner to operate at a higher cognitive level. He was also one of the first to envision technology as "mindtools," which posits that technology should be used to encourage individuals to learn "with" rather than "through" technology.
