= Michael R. Simonson =

American academic and author

Michael R. Simonson is an American academic who is professor of Instructional Technology & Distance Education at Nova Southeastern University, Editor of the Quarterly Review of Distance Education and Distance Learning Journal, and author of 4 texts in the area of ITDE.

== Biography ==
Simonson received his doctorate in Education: Instructional Systems Design in 1975 from the University of Iowa after serving for four years in the US Marine Corps as a Captain. He then went on to take a position as Professor of Curriculum and Instruction, Iowa State University from 1982 until 1998. During his time at ISU, Simonson served as the Associate Director for the Research Institute for Studies in Education from 1991 to 1996. He currently holds the position as the CEO of Technology Research and Evaluation as well as a professor at NSU, editor, and author.

== Published works ==
Simonson has written/co-written four books in the areas of Instructional Technology & Distance Education:

- Educational Computing Foundations by Michael R. Simonson, Ann D. Thompson - Education - 1996
- Teaching and Learning at a Distance: Foundations of Distance Education by Michael Simonson, Michael Albright - Education - 2005
- Distance Education: Definition And Glossary of Terms by Lee Ayers Schlosser, Michael R. Simonson - Education - 2006
- Trends and Issues in Distance Education: International Perspectives by Yusra Laila Visser, Lya Visser, Michael Simonson - Education - 2005

Simonson is a published researcher in the area of ITDE. Simonson has continued to investigate the relationship between media, motivation, attitudes, behaviors, and achievement. His research includes over $3 million in grants funded externally to investigate ITDE and learners relationship to various media.
