= Wicat Systems =

Computer assisted learning company

Wicat Systems, Inc.
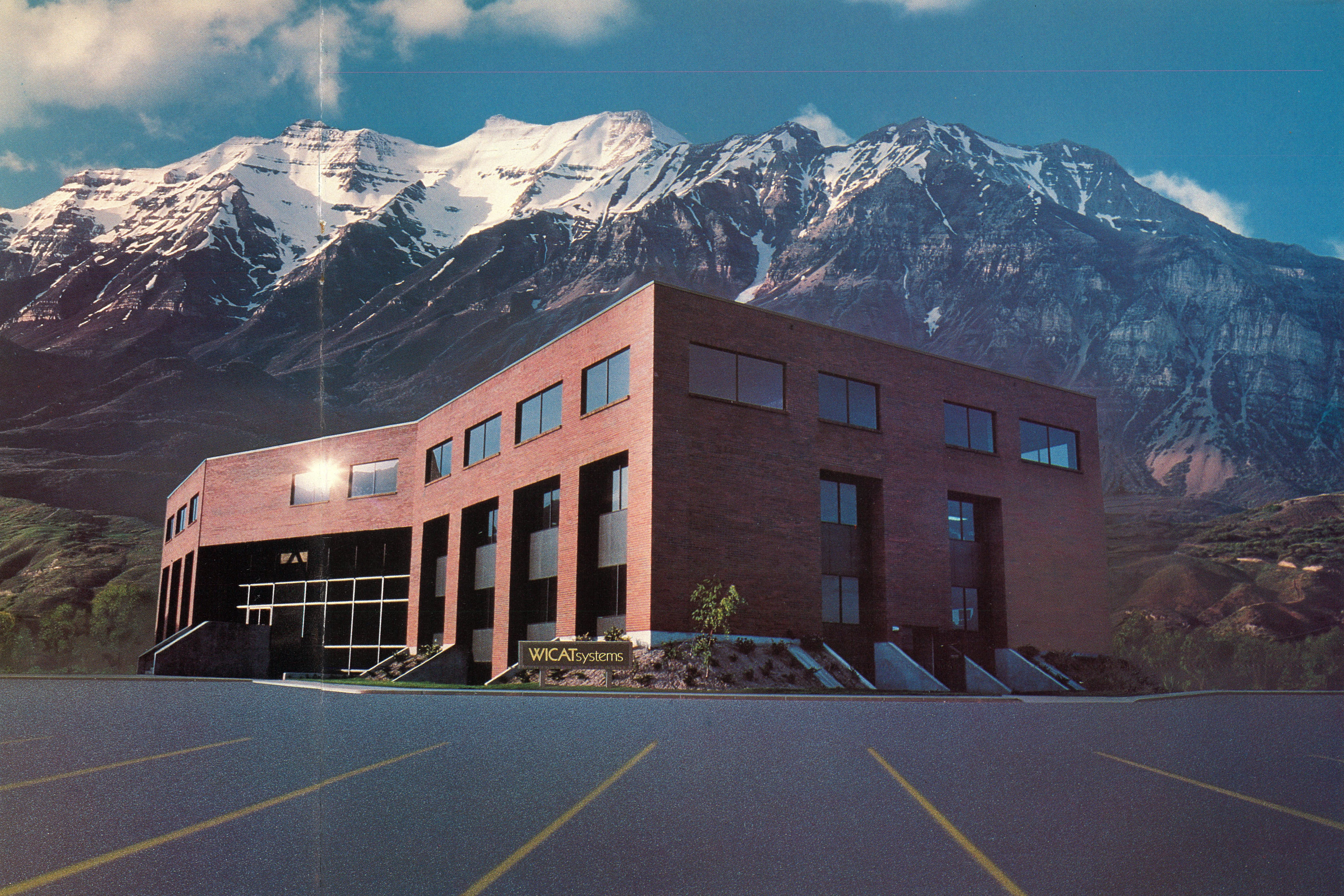
- Headquarters in Orem, Utah
- Type: Private
- Industry: Computer
- Founded: 1980; 46 years ago
- Founder: Dustin H. Heuston
- Defunct: April 1992; 34 years ago
- Fate: Acquired by Jostens
- Headquarters: United States
- Products: Wicat 150

Wicat Systems, Inc., was an American computer and software company founded in 1980 in Orem, Utah. Originally a branch of WICAT, the World Institute for Computer-Assisted Teaching (later the Wicat Education Institute), the company manufactured multi-user systems for educational institutions before focusing their efforts on educational software development in the early 1990s. The company was among the first to use the Motorola 68000 microprocessor in a computer with the introduction of the Wicat System 100 in 1980. Both Wicat Systems and its parent institution were founded by Dustin H. Heuston, originally of New York.

== History ==
At its peak in the mid-1980s, Wicat Systems employed 500 and had an annual budget of US$40 million. The company formed a joint venture with Control Data Corporation in early 1985. Named Plato/Wicat after Control Data's Plato educational software, the venture was intended to "address the entire educational process, including computer-based instructional courseware, testing and evaluation, and classroom management and administration".

In 1992, the company was acquired by Jostens in a stock swap valued at roughly $111 million. Jostens, which had a rival educational software division, Jostens Learning, aimed at preschools, planned to use the Wicat Systems repertoire to increase its presence in high schools and higher education.

During the period from the late 1980's to 1996, Wicat Systems also operated a UK branch in Camberley in Surrey. During this period, Wicat produced CBT (computer based training - the forerunner of eLearning), and partial cockpit simulations for aviation clients. These included many of the then-leading airlines and aircraft manufacturers and training covered pilot, cabin crew and ground crew training. Norfolk Southern Railway was another of many non-aviation clients.
