= Conditions of Learning =

1965 book by Robert M. Gagné

- Title page The Conditions of Learning (1965)
- Author: Robert M. Gagné
- Publisher: Holt, Rinehart and Winston
- Publication date: 1965

Conditions of Learning, by Robert M. Gagné, was originally published in 1965 by Holt, Rinehart and Winston and describes eight kinds of learning and nine events of instruction. This theory of learning involved two steps. The theory stipulates that there are several different types or levels of learning. The significance of these classifications is that each different type requires different types of instruction. Gagné identifies five major categories of learning: verbal information, intellectual skills, cognitive strategies, motor skills and attitudes. Different internal and external conditions are necessary for each type of learning. For example, for cognitive strategies to be learned, there must be a chance to practice developing new solutions to problems; to learn attitudes, the learner must be exposed to a credible role model or persuasive arguments.

Gagné suggests that learning tasks for intellectual skills can be organized in a hierarchy according to complexity: stimulus recognition, response generation, procedure following, use of terminology, discrimination, concept formation, rule application, and problem solving. The primary significance of the hierarchy is to identify prerequisites that should be completed to facilitate learning at each level. Prerequisites are identified by doing a task analysis of a learning/training task. Learning hierarchies provide a basis for the sequencing of instruction.

In addition, the theory outlines nine instructional events and corresponding cognitive processes:

1. Gaining attention (reception)
2. Informing learners of the objective (expectancy)
3. Stimulating recall of prior learning (retrieval)
4. Presenting the stimulus (selective perception)
5. Providing learning guidance (semantic encoding)
6. Eliciting performance (responding)
7. Providing feedback (reinforcement)
8. Assessing performance (retrieval)
9. Enhancing retention and transfer (generalization)

These events should satisfy or provide the necessary conditions for learning and serve as the basis for designing instruction and selecting appropriate media (Gagné, Briggs & Wager, 1992). Application

While Gagné's theoretical framework covers all aspects of learning, the focus of the theory is on intellectual skills. The theory has been applied to the design of instruction in all domains (Gagné & Driscoll, 1988). In its original formulation (Gagné, 1 962), special attention was given to military training settings. Gagné (1987) addresses the role of instructional technology in learning.
