= Vincenti =

Vincenti is a surname. Notable people with the surname include:

- Francesca Vincenti (born 1965), Maltese windsurfer
- Giacomo Vincenti (died 1619), Italian bookseller and music printer
- Gustavo R. Vincenti (1888–1974), Maltese architect and developer
- Peter Vincenti (born 1986), Jersey footballer
- Tomas De Vincenti (born 1989), Argentine footballer
- Walter G. Vincenti (1917–2019), American aeronautics engineer
- Paul Vincenti (born 1958), American Oil Painter
