= Model-centered instruction =

General theory of instructional design developed by Andrew S. Gibbons

Model-centered instruction is a general theory of instructional design developed by Andrew S. Gibbons. This theory can be used to design individual and group instruction for all kinds of learning in any type of learning environment. In addition, this theory may be used to design instruction with a wide variety of technologies and many media delivery systems.

== Theory summary ==
The theory of model-centered instruction is based on the assumption that the purpose of instruction is to help learners construct knowledge about objects and events in their environment. In the field of cognitive psychology, theorists assert that knowledge is represented and stored in human memory as dynamic, networked structures generally known as schema or mental models. This concept of mental models was incorporated by Gibbons into the theory of model-centered instruction. This theory is based on the assumption that learners construct mental models as they process information they have acquired through observations of or interactions with objects, events, and environments. Instructional designers can assist learners by (a) helping them focus attention on specific information about an object, event, or environment and (b) initiating events or activities designed to trigger learning processes.

Instructional designers may guide learner attention by introducing learners to carefully selected objects and events that occur in certain environments. In some situations, it is not possible to have learners work with real objects, events, or environments. In these cases, instructional designers may create representations of the objects, events, or environments. These representations are called models. A model is a definition or representation of an object, event, or environment that includes some information regarding their properties, actions, or cause-effect relationships. Instructional designers may use a variety of models to help learners construct their own mental models. A model can take various mediated forms, from simple textual descriptions to complex, multimedia simulations.

According to the theory of model-centered instruction, there are three types of models: (a) a natural or manufactured cause-effect system, (b) an environment in which one or more systems operate, or (c) an expert performance—a set of purposeful, goal-driven actions that causes changes within systems and environments. These three types of models — system, environment, and expert performance - form a comprehensive framework for the representation and communication of subject-matter information in any domain.

When learners interact with complex objects or models, they sometimes need assistance in discovering and processing information. Instructional designers can guide learners by introducing problems to be solved in a sequence that may be partially or fully determined by the learner. Gibbons defines a problem as “a request for information about an incompletely known model. A problem is a request for the learner…to supply one or more of the model’s behaviors, elements, or interrelations that are missing”. Problems act as filters or masks that focus learner attention on specific information about the objects or models. Problems also trigger learning processes used in the construction of mental models. As problems are solved in sequence, learners process more information and construct more comprehensive and useful mental models.

== Principles of Model-Centered Instruction ==
Gibbons has defined seven principles that summarize the general design prescriptions of model-centered instruction. These principles are related to the overall instructional purposes, subject-matter content, and instructional strategies of model-centered instruction. Key ideas related to designing, selecting, and sequencing problems can also be found in these principles. In addition, these principles provide guidance in how to provide supportive information, physical materials, tools, and personalized assistance to the learner. These principles, as defined by Gibbons, are listed below.

1. Experience: Learners should be given maximum opportunity to interact for learning purposes with one or more systems or models of systems of three types: environment, system, and/or expert performance. The terms model and simulation are not synonymous; models can be expressed in a variety of computer-based and non-computer-based forms.

2. Problem solving: Interaction with systems or models should be focused by the solution of one or more carefully selected problems, expressed in terms of the model, with solutions being performed by the learner, by a peer, or by an expert.

3. Denaturing: Models are necessarily denatured from the real by the medium in which they are expressed. Designers must select a level of denaturing matching the target learner’s existing knowledge and goals.

4. Sequence: Problems should be arranged in a carefully constructed sequence for modeled solution or for active learner solution.

5. Goal orientation: Problems selected should be appropriate for the attainment of specific instructional goals.

6. Resourcing: The learner should be given problem solving information resources, materials, and tools within a solution environment (which may exist only in the learner’s mind) commensurate with instructional goals and existing levels of knowledge.

7. Instructional augmentation: The learner should be given support during solving in the form of dynamic, specialized, designed instructional augmentations.
