= Instructional modeling =

Pedagogical practice where instructors act out processes which students imitate

Instructional modeling is a common pedagogical practice where an instructor “acts out” or conducts an exhibition of proper skill performance, process execution, or cognitive processing (e.g. think-aloud). Students refer to the instructor's model and attempt to mimic or reproduce what they observed. Repetition of instructor modeling and subsequent student reproduction promotes automaticity of taught skills, procedures and cognition, which improves student performance.

Quite often, instructional modeling is utilized in conjunction with role playing. Joint modeling and role playing practices may follow an “I do, We do, You do” instructional scaffolding strategy: “I do” refers to the instructor's modeling of a concept; “We do” involves students performing the concept (i.e. either a reproduction of the instructor's model or a role playing scenario) with instructor support; “You do” refers to students’ autonomous performance of the concept (i.e. through a role playing scenario, modeling reproduction, or real-world application).

== Applications of Instructional Modeling ==
Instructional modeling is used across different subject areas to demonstrate skills, strategies, and behaviors that students can observe and practice. In reading instruction, teachers use think-aloud strategies to demonstrate how experienced readers understand and interpret texts. During a think-aloud, teachers verbalize their thought processes, showing students how to make predictions, ask questions, use prior knowledge, and monitor their comprehension. Walker explains that struggling readers may need more than a demonstration of a reading strategy. Teachers may also need to model specific questions and statements that help students recognize misunderstandings and evaluate their comprehension. Self-evaluation activities can further help students reflect on the strategies they use while reading.

In music education, instructional modeling allows teachers to demonstrate musical techniques through performances and examples. Haston describes how music teachers can use aural modeling, in which students listen to a musical example and attempt to reproduce it. Teachers may demonstrate rhythms, articulation, tone, or instrumental techniques through live performances or recordings. Students can then practice reproducing these examples to develop their musical skills and understanding.

Instructional modeling can also extend beyond academic skills to include behaviors and attitudes. Higgs and McMillan examined how four secondary schools incorporated sustainability into their educational environments. Their research identified ways schools modeled sustainable practices through individual role models, school facilities and operations, school governance, and school culture. Teachers and staff demonstrated environmentally responsible behaviors, while students participated in activities such as recycling, gardening, and maintaining school facilities. These examples allowed students to observe how sustainability concepts could be applied in everyday situations.

== Limitations and Challenges of Instructional Modeling ==
Although instructional modeling can support student learning, observing a demonstration does not always provide students with enough information to understand or independently perform a skill. Some students may require additional explanations, guided practice, and opportunities to reflect on their understanding. Walker discusses this challenge in reading instruction, particularly for students who struggle with comprehension. Simply demonstrating a reading strategy may not be sufficient; teachers may also need to explain their thought processes, model self-questioning, and provide activities that help students evaluate their understanding.

Another consideration is balancing teacher demonstrations with opportunities for student independence and creativity. In music education, Haston discusses the importance of modeling as a teaching strategy while considering concerns about imitation and rote learning. Students benefit from observing examples, but instruction should also allow them to develop their own interpretations and approaches. Teachers must consider how much guidance to provide while allowing students opportunities to practice, experiment, and apply skills independently.

== See also ==
- Instructional design

== External Sources ==
Haston, W. (2007). Teacher modeling as an effective teaching strategy. Music Educators Journal, 93(4), 26–30. https://www.proquest.com/docview/197185916

Higgs, A. L., & McMillan, V. M. (2006). Teaching through modeling: Four schools” experiences in sustainability education. The Journal of Environmental Education, 38(1), 39–53. https://doi.org/10.3200/joee.38.1.39-53

Walker, B. J. (2005). Thinking aloud: Struggling readers often require more than a model. The Reading Teacher, 58(7), 688–692. https://doi.org/10.1598/rt.58.7.10
