= Robert M. Gagné =

American educational psychologist (1916–2002)

Robert Mills Gagné
- Born: August 21, 1916; North Andover, Massachusetts
- Died: April 28, 2002 (aged 85); Signal Mountain, Tennessee
- Education: Yale University (A.B.); Brown University (Sc.M., Ph.D.)
- Known for: Conditions of Learning
- Scientific career
- Fields: Psychology, educational psychology

Robert Mills Gagné (August 21, 1916 – April 28, 2002) was an American educational psychologist best known for his Conditions of Learning. He instructed during World War II when he worked with the Army Air Corps training pilots. He went on to develop a series of studies and works that simplified and explained what he and others believed to be good instruction. Gagné was also involved in applying concepts of instructional theory to the design of computer-based training and multimedia-based learning. His work is sometimes summarized as the Gagné assumption: that different types of learning exist, and that different instructional conditions are most likely to bring about these different types of learning.

== Biography ==
=== Early life and education ===
Robert Mills Gagné was born on August 21, 1916, in North Andover, Massachusetts. In high school, he decided to study psychology and be a psychologist after reading psychological texts. In his valedictory speech of 1932, Gagné professed that the science of psychology should be used to relieve the burdens of human life.

Gagné received a scholarship to Yale University, where he earned his A.B. in 1937. He then went on to receive his Sc.M. and Ph.D. at Brown University where he studied the conditioned operate response of white rats as part of his thesis.

=== Career ===
His first college teaching job was in 1940, at Connecticut College for Women.

His initial studies of people were interrupted by World War II. In the first year of war, at Psychological Research Unit No. 1, Maxwell Field, Alabama, he administered and scored aptitude tests to choose and sort aviation cadets. Thereafter, he was assigned to officer school in Miami Beach. He was commissioned a second lieutenant, and assigned to School of Aviation Medicine, Randolph Field, Fort Worth, Texas.

After the war, he held a temporary faculty position at Pennsylvania State University. He returned to Connecticut College for Women. In 1949, he accepted an offer to join the US Air Force organization that became the Air Force Personnel and Training Research Center, where he was research director of the Perceptual and Motor Skills Laboratory. In 1958, he returned to academia as professor at Princeton University, where his research shifted focus to the learning of problem solving and the learning of mathematics. In 1962, he joined the American Institutes for Research, where he wrote his first book, Conditions of Learning. He spent additional time in academia at the University of California, Berkeley, where he worked with graduate students. With W. K. Roher, he presented a paper, "Instructional Psychology", to the Annual Review of Psychology.

In 1969, he found a lasting home at Florida State University. He collaborated with L. J. Briggs on Principles of Learning. He published the second and third editions of The Conditions of Learning.

=== Personal life ===
Gagné's wife, Pat, was a biologist. They had a son, Sam, and daughter, Ellen. His non-professional pursuits included constructing wood furniture and reading modern fiction. In 1993, he retired to Signal Mountain, Tennessee, with his wife. Dr. Gagné was known to base his foundations on behaviorism.

== Taxonomy ==
Gagné classified the types of learning outcomes by asking how learning might be demonstrated. His domains and outcomes of learning correspond to standard verbs.

- Cognitive Domain

Verbal information - is stated: state, recite, tell, declare
Intellectual skills - label or classify the concepts
Intellectual skills - apply the rules and principles
Intellectual skills - problem solve by generating solutions or procedures

Discrimination: discriminate, distinguish, differentiate
Concrete Concept: identify, name, specify, label
Defined Concept: classify, categorize, type, sort (by definition)
Rule: demonstrate, show, solve (using one rule)
Higher order rule: generate, develop, solve (using two or more rules)

Cognitive strategies - are used for learning: adopt, create, originate

- Affective Domain

Attitudes - are demonstrated by preferring options: choose, prefer, elect, favor

- Psychomotor Domain

Motor skills - enable physical performance: execute, perform, carry out

== Learning process ==
Gagné's theory stipulates that there are several types and levels of learning, and each of these types and levels requires instruction that is tailored to meet the needs of the pupil. The focus of Gagné's theory is on the retention and honing of intellectual skills. The theory has been applied to the design of instruction in all fields, though in its original formulation special attention was given to military training settings.

=== Eight ways to learn ===
In 1956, Gagné devised a system of analyzing different conditions of learning from simple to complex. According to Gagné, higher orders of learning are built upon the lower levels, requiring a greater amount of previous knowledge to progress successfully; final capability is analysed as comprising subordinate skills in an order such that the lower levels can be predicted for positive transfer of higher level learning. The lower four orders focus on the behavioral aspects of learning, while the higher four focus on the cognitive aspects. In his original study on instruction, Gagné attributed individual differences in learning.

=== Steps of planning instruction ===
1. Identify the types of learning outcomes: Each outcome may have prerequisite knowledge or skills that must be identified.
2. Identify the internal conditions or processes the learner must have to achieve the outcomes.
3. Identify the external conditions or instruction needed to achieve the outcomes.
4. Specify the learning context.
5. Record the characteristics of the learners.
6. Select the media for instruction.
7. Plan to motivate the learners.
8. Test the instruction with learners in the form of formative evaluation.
9. After the instruction has been used, summative evaluation is used to judge the effectiveness of the instruction.

=== Nine Events of Instruction ===
According to Gagné, learning occurs in a series of nine learning events, each of which is a condition for learning which must be accomplished before moving to the next in order. Similarly, instructional events should mirror the learning events:

1. Gaining attention: To ensure reception of coming instruction, the teacher gives the learners a stimulus. Before the learners can start to process any new information, the instructor must gain the attention of the learners. This might entail using abrupt changes in the instruction.
2. Informing learners of objectives: The teacher tells the learner what they will be able to do because of the instruction. The teacher communicates the desired outcome to the group.
3. Stimulating recall of prior learning: The teacher asks for recall of existing relevant knowledge.
4. Presenting the stimulus: The teacher gives emphasis to distinctive features.
5. Providing learning guidance: The teacher helps the students in understanding (semantic encoding) by providing organization and relevance.
6. Eliciting performance: The teacher asks the learners to respond, demonstrating learning.
7. Providing feedback: The teacher gives informative feedback on the learners' performance.
8. Assessing performance: The teacher requires more learner performance, and gives feedback, to reinforce learning.
9. Enhancing retention and transfer: The teacher provides varied practice to generalize the capability.

Some educators believe that Gagné's taxonomy of learning outcomes and events of instruction oversimplify the learning process by over-prescribing. However, using them as part of a complete instructional package can assist many educators in becoming more organized and staying focused on the instructional goals.

=== Evaluation of instruction ===
1. Have the objectives been met?
2. Is the new program better than the previous one?
3. What additional effects does the new program include?

When objectively analyzing the conditions for learning Gagné says, "Since the purpose of instruction is learning, the central focus for rational derivation of instructional techniques is the human learner. Development of rationally sound instructional procedures must take into account learner characteristics such as initiate capacities, experimental maturity, and current knowledge states. Such factors become parameters of the design of any particular program of instruction."

== Influence ==
Robert Gagné's work has been the foundation of instructional design since the beginning of the 1960s when he conducted research and developed training materials for the military. Among the first to coin the term "instructional design", Gagné developed some of the earliest instructional design models and ideas. These models have laid the groundwork for more present-day instructional design models from theorists like Dick, Carey, and Carey (The Dick and Carey Systems Approach Model), Jerold Kemp's Instructional Design Model, and David Merrill (Merrill's First Principle of Instruction). Each of these models are based on a core set of learning phases that include (1) activation of prior experience, (2) demonstration of skills, (3) application of skills, and (4) integration or these skills into real world activities.

Gagné's main focus for instructional design was how instruction and learning could be systematically connected to the design of instruction. He emphasized the design principles and procedures that need to take place for effective teaching and learning. His initial ideas, along with the ideas of other early instructional designers were outlined in Psychological Principles in Systematic Development, written by Roberts B. Miller and edited by Gagné. Gagné believed in internal learning and motivation which paved the way for theorists like Merrill, Li, and Jones who designed the Instructional Transaction Theory, Reigeluth and Stein's Elaboration Theory, and most notably, Keller's ARCS Model of Motivation and Design.

Prior to Robert Gagné, learning was often thought of as a single, uniform process. There was little or no distinction made between "learning to load a rifle and learning to solve a complex mathematical problem". Gagné offered an alternative view which developed the idea that different learners required different learning strategies. Understanding and designing instruction based on a learning style defined by the individual brought about new theories and approaches to teaching. Gagné 's understanding and theories of human learning added significantly to understanding the stages in cognitive processing and instructions. For example, Gagné argued that instructional designers must understand the characteristics and functions of short-term and long-term memory to facilitate meaningful learning. This idea encouraged instructional designers to include cognitive needs as a top-down instructional approach.

Gagné (1966) defines curriculum as a sequence of content units arranged in such a way that the learning of each unit may be accomplished as a single act, provided the capabilities described by specified prior units (in the sequence) have already been mastered by the learner.

His definition of curriculum has been the basis of many important initiatives in schools and other educational environments. In the late 1950s and early 1960s, Gagné had expressed and established an interest in applying theory to practice with particular interest in applications for teaching, training and learning. Increasing the effectiveness and efficiency of practice was of particular concern. His ongoing attention to practice while developing theory continues to influence education and training.

Gagné's work has had a significant influence on American education, and military and industrial training. Gagné was one of the early developers of the concept of instructional systems design which suggests the components of a lesson can be analyzed and should be designed to operate together as an integrated plan for instruction. In "Educational Technology and the Learning Process" (Educational Researcher, 1974), Gagné defined instruction as "the set of planned external events which influence the process of learning and thus promote learning".

== Awards ==
- Membership in Phi Beta Kappa, Sigma Xi, and the National Academy of Education
- Eminent Lectureship Award by the Society of Engineering Education
- Phi Delta Kappa Award for Distingued Educational Research
- E. L. Thorndike Award in Educational Psychology
- John Smyth Memorial Award from the Victorian Institute of Educational Research
- The Robert O. Lawton Distinguished Professorship, Florida State University'c highest award
- American Psychological Association Scientific Award for Applications of Psychology
- Educational Technology Person of the Year Award
- AECT Outstanding Educator and Researcher Award

== See also ==
- Instructional design

Educational offices
Preceded by Roald Campbell	President of the American Educational Research Association; 1970-1971	Succeeded by Robert Glaser
