= Instructional design =

Process for design and development of learning resources

Instructional design (ID), also known as instructional systems design and originally known as instructional systems development (ISD), is the practice of systematically designing, developing and delivering instructional materials and experiences, both digital and physical, in a consistent and reliable fashion toward an efficient, effective, appealing, engaging and inspiring acquisition of knowledge. The process consists broadly of determining the state and needs of the learner, defining the end goal of instruction, and creating some "intervention" to assist in the transition. The outcome of this instruction may be directly observable and scientifically measured or completely hidden and assumed.

Learning theories also play an important role in the design of instructional materials. Theories such as behaviorism, constructivism, social learning, and cognitivism help shape and define the outcome of instructional materials. There are numerous instructional design models, but many are based on the ADDIE model with its five phases: analysis, design, development, implementation, and evaluation.

== History ==
=== Origins ===
As a field, instructional design is historically and traditionally rooted in cognitive and behavioral psychology, though recently constructivism has influenced thinking in the field. This development coincided with a time when the behaviorist paradigm was prevalent in American psychology. There are also those who cite that, aside from behaviorist psychology, the origin of the concept could be traced back to systems engineering. While the impact of each of these fields is difficult to quantify, it is argued that the language and the "look and feel" of the early forms of instructional design and their progeny were derived from this engineering discipline. Specifically, they were linked to the training development model used by the U.S. military, which were based on systems approach and was explained as "the idea of viewing a problem or situation in its entirety with all its ramifications, with all its interior interactions, with all its exterior connections and with full cognizance of its place in its context."

The role of systems engineering in the early development of instructional design was demonstrated during World War II when a considerable amount of training materials for the military were developed based on the principles of instruction, learning, and human behavior. Tests for assessing a learner's abilities were used to screen candidates for the training programs. After the success of military training, psychologists began to view training as a system and developed various analysis, design, and evaluation procedures. In 1946, Edgar Dale outlined a hierarchy of instructional methods, organized intuitively by their concreteness. The framework first migrated to the industrial sector to train workers before it finally found its way to the education field.

=== 1950s ===
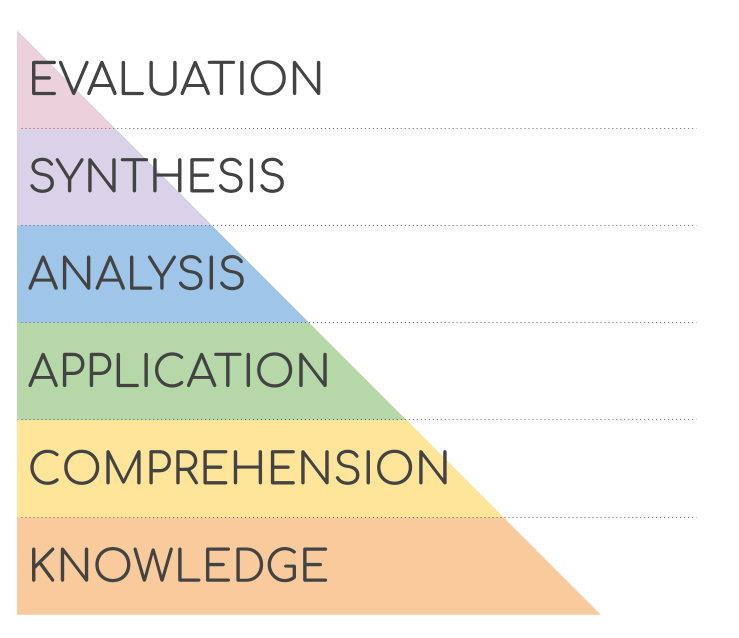
The original version of Bloom's taxonomy (published in 1956) defined a cognitive domain in terms of six objectives.

In 1954, B. F. Skinner suggested that effective instructional materials, called programmed instructional materials, should include small steps, frequent questions, and immediate feedback; and should allow self-pacing. Robert F. Mager popularized the use of learning objectives. The article describes how to write objectives including desired behavior, learning condition, and assessment.

In 1956, a committee led by Benjamin Bloom published an influential taxonomy with three domains of learning: cognitive (what one knows or thinks), psychomotor (what one does, physically) and affective (what one feels, or what attitudes one has). Bloom's taxonomy still influences the design of instruction.

=== 1960s ===
Robert Glaser introduced "criterion-referenced measures" in 1962. In contrast to norm-referenced tests in which an individual's performance is compared to group performance, a criterion-referenced test is designed to test an individual's behavior in relation to an objective standard. It can be used to assess the learners' entry level behavior, and to what extent learners have developed mastery through an instructional program.

In 1965, Robert Gagné described three domains of learning outcomes (cognitive, affective, psychomotor), five types of learning (verbal information, intellectual skills, cognitive strategy, attitude, motor skills), and nine events of instruction in the conditions of learning, which remain foundations of instructional design practices. Gagné's work in learning hierarchies and hierarchical analysis led to an important notion in instruction – to ensure that learners acquire prerequisite skills before attempting superordinate ones.

In 1967, after analyzing the failure of training material, Michael Scriven suggested the need for formative assessment – e.g., to try out instructional materials with learners (and revise accordingly) before declaring them finalized.

=== 1970s ===
During the 1970s, the number of instructional design models greatly increased and prospered in different sectors in military, academia, and industry. Many instructional design theorists began to adopt an information-processing-based approach to the design of instruction. David Merrill for instance developed Component Display Theory (CDT), which concentrates on the means of presenting instructional materials (presentation techniques).

=== 1980s ===
Although interest in instructional design continued to be strong in business and the military, there was little evolution of ID in schools or higher education. However, educators and researchers began to consider how the personal computer could be used in a learning environment or a learning space. PLATO is one example of how computers began to be integrated into instruction. Many of the first uses of computers in the classroom were for "drill and skill" exercises. There was a growing interest in how cognitive psychology could be applied to instructional design.

=== 1990s ===
During the 1990s, performance improvement also emerged as a key goal in the design process. The rise of the Internet introduced new tools for online learning, which were seen as effective for supporting learning. As both technology and constructivist theory evolved, classroom practices shifted—from basic drill-and-practice methods to more interactive, cognitively demanding activities.

By the late 1990s and early 2000s, the term learning design entered the field of educational technology. It reflected the idea that designers and instructors should choose an appropriate blend of behaviorist and constructivist strategies for their online courses. However, the underlying concept of designing for learning is likely as old as teaching itself. One definition describes learning design as “the description of the teaching-learning process that takes place in a unit of learning (e.g., a course, a lesson, or any other structured learning event).”

=== 2000–2010 ===
In 2008, the Association for Educational Communications and Technology changed the definition of educational technology to "the study and ethical practice of facilitating learning and improving performance, by creating, using, and managing appropriate technological processes and resources".

=== 2010–2020 ===
Academic degrees focused on integrating technology, internet, and human–computer interaction with education gained momentum with the introduction of Learning Design and Technology (LDT) majors. Universities such as Bowling Green State University, Pennsylvania State University, Purdue, San Diego State University, Stanford, Harvard University of Georgia, California State University, Fullerton, and Carnegie Mellon University have established undergraduate and graduate degrees in technology-centered methods of designing and delivering education.

Informal learning became an area of growing importance in instructional design, particularly in the workplace. A 2014 study showed that formal training makes up only 4 percent of the 505 hours per year an average employee spends learning. It also found that the learning output of informal learning is equal to that of formal training. As a result of this and other research, more emphasis was placed on creating knowledge bases and other supports for self-directed learning.

=== Timeline ===
Instructional media history
Era	Media	Characteristics	Outcome
1900s	Visual media	School museum as supplementary material (First school museum opened in St. Louis in 1905)	Materials are viewed as supplementary curriculum materials. District-wide media center is the modern equivalent.
1914-1923	Visual media films, slides, photography	Visual instruction movement	The effect of visual instruction was limited because of teacher resistance to change, quality of the file and cost etc.
Mid 1920s to 1930s	Radio broadcasting, sound recordings, sound motion pictures	Radio audiovisual instruction movement	Education in large was not affected.
World War II	Training films, overhead projector, slide projector, audio equipment, simulators and training devices	Military and industry at this time had strong demand for training.	Growth of audio-visual instruction movement in school was slow, but audiovisual device were used extensively in military services and industry.
Post World War II	Communication medium	Suggested to consider all aspects of a communication process (influenced by communication theories).	This view point was first ignored, but eventually helped to expand the focus of the audiovisual movement.
1950s to mid-1960s	Television	Growth of instructional television	Instructional television was not adopted to a greater extent.
1950s-1990s	Computer	Computer-assisted instruction (CAI) research started in the 1950s, became popular in the 1980s a few years after computers became available to general public.	The effect of CAI was rather small and the use of computer was far from innovative.
1990s-2000s	Internet, simulation	The internet offered opportunities to train many people over long distances. Desktop simulation gave advent to levels of Interactive Multimedia Instruction (IMI).	Online training increased rapidly to the point where entire curriculums were given through web-based training. Simulations are valuable but expensive, with the highest level being used primarily by the military and medical community.
2000s-2020s	Mobile devices, social media	On-demand training moved to people's personal devices; social media allowed for collaborative learning. Smartphones allowed for real-time interactive feedback.	Personalized learning paths enhanced by artificial intelligence. Microlearning and gamification are widely adopted to deliver learning in the flow of work. Real-time data capture enables ongoing design and remediation.

== Models/Frameworks ==
=== ADDIE model ===
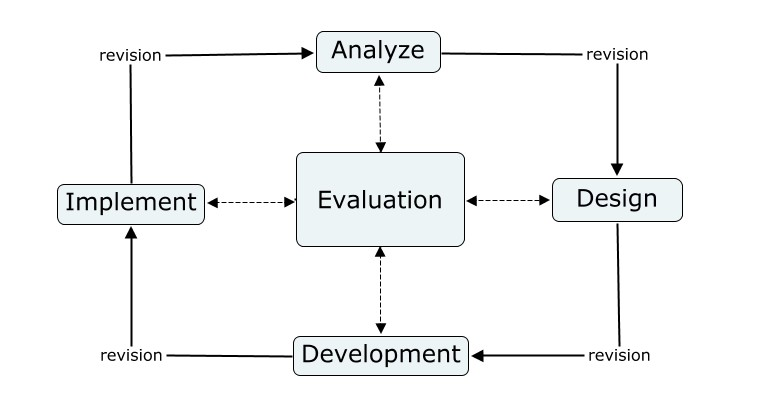
The ADDIE model.

Perhaps the most common model used for creating instructional materials is the ADDIE Model. This acronym stands for the five phases contained in the model: Analyze, Design, Develop, Implement, and Evaluate.

The ADDIE model was initially developed by Florida State University to explain "the processes involved in the formulation of an instructional systems development (ISD) program for military interservice training that will adequately train individuals to do a particular job, and which can also be applied to any interservice curriculum development activity." The model originally contained several steps under its five original phases (Analyze, Design, Develop, Implement, and [Evaluation and] Control), whose completion was expected before movement to the next phase could occur. Over the years, the steps were revised and eventually the model itself became more dynamic and interactive than its original hierarchical rendition, until its most popular version appeared in the mid-80s, as we understand it today.

Connecting all phases of the model are external and reciprocal opportunities for revision. As in the internal evaluation phase, revisions can be made throughout the entire process.

Most of the current instructional design models are variations of the ADDIE model.

=== Bloom's Taxonomy ===
Bloom's taxonomy is a framework developed by Benjamin Bloom and colleagues in 1956, with the levels revised in 2001. It organizes cognitive skills to assist instructional designers in developing learning activities. As learners progress through the levels, they move from basic recall to concept application and, ultimately, knowledge integration and problem-solving.

The six levels are:

1. Remember
2. Understand
3. Apply
4. Analyze
5. Evaluate
6. Create

=== Gagné's Nine Events of Instruction ===
According to Robert Gagné, learning occurs through a sequence of nine events, each representing a condition that must be met before progressing to the next. Similarly, instructional events are designed to mirror these learning events:

1. Gaining attention: To ensure reception of coming instruction, the teacher gives the learners a stimulus. Before the learners can start to process any new information, the instructor must gain the attention of the learners. This might entail using abrupt changes in the instruction.
2. Informing learners of objectives: The teacher tells the learner what they will be able to do because of the instruction. The teacher communicates the desired outcome to the group.
3. Stimulating recall of prior learning: The teacher asks for recall of existing relevant knowledge.
4. Presenting the stimulus: The teacher gives emphasis to distinctive features.
5. Providing learning guidance: The teacher helps the students in understanding (semantic encoding) by providing organization and relevance.
6. Eliciting performance: The teacher asks the learners to respond, demonstrating learning.
7. Providing feedback: The teacher gives informative feedback on the learners' performance.
8. Assessing performance: The teacher requires more learner performance, and gives feedback, to reinforce learning.
9. Enhancing retention and transfer: The teacher provides varied practice to generalize the capability

=== Rapid prototyping ===
Proponents suggest that through an iterative process the verification of the design documents saves time and money by catching problems while they are still easy to fix. This approach is not novel to the design of instruction, but appears in many design-related domains including software design, architecture, transportation planning, product development, message design, user experience design, etc. In fact, some proponents of design prototyping assert that a sophisticated understanding of a problem is incomplete without creating and evaluating some type of prototype, regardless of the analysis rigor that may have been applied up front. In other words, up-front analysis is rarely sufficient to allow one to confidently select an instructional model. For this reason many traditional methods of instructional design are beginning to be seen as incomplete, naive, and even counter-productive.

=== Dick and Carey ===
Another well-known instructional design model is the Dick and Carey Systems Approach Model. The model was originally published in 1978 by Walter Dick and Lou Carey in their book entitled The Systematic Design of Instruction.

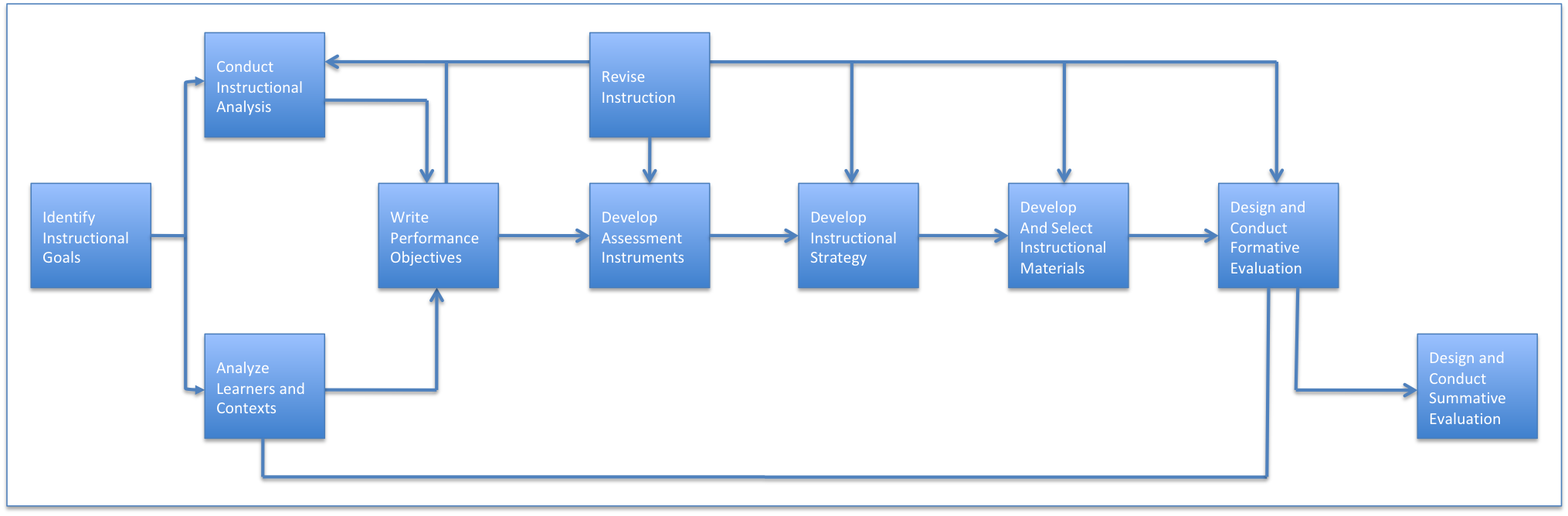
Systems Approach Model

Dick and Carey made a significant contribution to the instructional design field by championing a systems view of instruction, in contrast to defining instruction as the sum of isolated parts. The model addresses instruction as an entire system, focusing on the interrelationship between context, content, learning and instruction. According to Dick and Carey, "Components such as the instructor, learners, materials, instructional activities, delivery system, and learning and performance environments interact with each other and work together to bring about the desired student learning outcomes". The components of the Systems Approach Model, also known as the Dick and Carey Model, are as follows:

- Identify instructional goal(s): A goal statement describes a skill, knowledge or attitude (SKA) that a learner will be expected to acquire
- Conduct instructional analysis: Identify what a learner must recall and identify what learner must be able to do to perform particular task
- Analyze learners and contexts: Identify general characteristics of the target audience, including prior skills, prior experience, and basic demographics; identify characteristics directly related to the skill to be taught; and perform analysis of the performance and learning settings.
- Write performance objectives: Objectives consists of a description of the behavior, the condition and criteria. The component of an objective that describes the criteria will be used to judge the learner's performance.
- Develop assessment instruments: Purpose of entry behavior testing, purpose of pretesting, purpose of post-testing, purpose of practice items/practice problems
- Develop instructional strategy: Pre-instructional activities, content presentation, learner participation, assessment
- Develop and select instructional materials
- Design and conduct formative evaluation of instruction: Designers try to identify areas of the instructional materials that need improvement.
- Revise instruction: To identify poor test items and to identify poor instruction
- Design and conduct summative evaluation

With this model, components are executed iteratively and in parallel, rather than linearly.

=== Guaranteed learning ===
The instructional design model Guaranteed Learning was formerly known as the Instructional Development Learning System (IDLS). The model was originally published in 1970 by Peter J. Esseff, and Mary Sullivan Esseff, in their book IDLS—Pro Trainer 1: How to Design, Develop, and Validate Instructional Materials.

Peter (1968) and Mary (1972) Esseff both received their doctorates in educational technology from the Catholic University of America under the mentorship of Gabriel Ofiesh, a founding father of the Military Model mentioned above. Esseff and Esseff synthesized existing theories to develop their approach to systematic design, "Guaranteed Learning" aka "Instructional Development Learning System" (IDLS). In 2015, the Drs. Esseffs created an eLearning course to enable participants to take the GL course online under the direction of Esseff.

The components of the Guaranteed Learning Model are the following:

- Design a task analysis
- Develop criterion tests and performance measures
- Develop interactive instructional materials
- Validate the interactive instructional materials
- Create simulations or performance activities (Case Studies, Role Plays, and Demonstrations)

=== Motivational design ===
==== Arcs model ====
Motivation is defined as an internal drive that activates behavior and gives it direction. The term motivation theory is concerned with the process that describes why and how human behavior is activated and directed. Motivation concepts include intrinsic motivation and extrinsic motivation.

John M. Keller has devoted his career to researching and understanding motivation in instructional systems. These decades of work constitute a major contribution to the instructional design field. First, by applying motivation theories systematically to design theory. Second, in developing a unique problem-solving process he calls the ARCS model.

==== MOM ====
Although Keller's ARCS model currently dominates instructional design with respect to learner motivation, in 2006 Hardré and Miller proposed a need for a new design model that includes current research in human motivation, a comprehensive treatment of motivation, integrates various fields of psychology and provides designers the flexibility to be applied to a myriad of situations.

Hardré proposes an alternate model for designers called the Motivating Opportunities Model or MOM. Hardré's model incorporates cognitive, needs, and affective theories as well as social elements of learning to address learner motivation. MOM has seven key components spelling the acronym 'SUCCESS' – Situational, Utilization, Competence, Content, Emotional, Social, and Systemic.

=== Other ===
Other useful instructional design models include: the Smith/Ragan Model, the Morrison/Ross/Kemp Model, the OAR Model of instructional design in higher education, the Gerlach and Ely model, the Knirk & Gustafson model, SAM (the Successive Approximation Model), and Wiggins' theory of backward design.

== Influential researchers and theorists ==
Alphabetic by last name

- Bloom, Benjamin – Taxonomies of the cognitive, affective, and psychomotor domains – 1950s
- Bransford, John D. – How People Learn: Bridging Research and Practice – 1990s
- Bruner, Jerome – Constructivism - 1950s-1990s
- Gagné, Robert M. – The Conditions of Learning has had a great influence on the discipline.
- Gibbons, Andrew S - developed the Theory of Model Centered Instruction; a theory rooted in Cognitive Psychology.
- Heinich, Robert – Instructional Media and the new technologies of instruction 3rd ed. – Educational Technology – 1989
- Jonassen, David – problem-solving strategies – 1990s
- Kemp, Jerold E. – Created a cognitive learning design model - 1980s
- Mager, Robert F. – ABCD model for instructional objectives – 1962 - Criterion-Referenced Instruction and Learning Objectives
- Marzano, Robert J. - "Dimensions of Learning", Formative Assessment - 2000s
- Mayer, Richard E. - Multimedia Learning - 2000s
- Merrill, M. David – Component Display Theory / Knowledge Objects / First Principles of Instruction
- Osguthorpe, Russell T. – Overview of Instructional Design – The education of the heart: rediscovering the spiritual roots of learning
- Papert, Seymour – Constructionism, LOGO – 1970s-1980s
- Piaget, Jean – Cognitive development – 1960s
- Reigeluth, Charles – Elaboration Theory, "Green Books" I, II, and III – 1990s–2010s
- Rita Richey - instructional design theory and research methods
- Schank, Roger – Constructivist simulations – 1990s
- Simonson, Michael – Instructional Systems and Design via Distance Education – 1980s
- Skinner, B.F. – Radical Behaviorism, Programed Instruction - 1950s-1970s
- Sweller, John – Cognitive Load Theory
- Vygotsky, Lev – Learning as a social activity – 1930s
- Wiley, David A. - influential work on open content, open educational resources, and informal online learning communities

== See also ==
- Confidence-based learning – Learning system
- Design-based learning – Learner centric pedagogy
- E-learning (theory) – Cognitive science principles of effective multimedia learning
- Educational animation – Animations produced for the specific purpose of fostering learning
- Educational assessment – Educational evaluation method
- Educational psychology – Branch of psychology concerned with the scientific study of human learning
- Educational technology – Use of technology in education to enhance learning and teaching
- Electronic portfolio – Collection of electronic evidence assembled and managed by a user
- Expertise reversal effect – Educational concept
- Interdisciplinary teaching – Methods used to teach across curricular disciplines
- Instructional design coordinator – Process for design and development of learning resources
- Instructional theory – Theory that offers explicit guidance on how to better help people learn and develop
- Interaction design – Specialization of design focused on the experience users have of a product or service
- Learning object
- Learning sciences – Study of how people learn
- Lesson study – Teaching improvement process
- M-learning – Distance education using mobile device technology
- Pedagogy – Theory and practice of education
- Storyboard – Use of graphics to plan a film or story
- Understanding by Design – Educational planning approach
- Universal Design for Learning – Educational framework
