= ADDIE model =

Instructional systems design framework

The ADDIE model is an instructional systems design (ISD) framework that many instructional designers and training developers use to develop courses. The name is an acronym for the five phases it defines for building training and performance support tools: analysis, design, development, implementation, and evaluation.

Most current ISD models are variations of the ADDIE process. Other models include the Dick and Carey and Kemp ISD models. Rapid prototyping is another common alternative.

Instructional theories are important in instructional materials design. These include behaviorism, constructivism, social learning, and cognitivism.

== History ==
Florida State University initially developed the ADDIE framework in 1975 to explain, “...the processes involved in the formulation of an instructional systems development (ISD) program for military interservice training that will adequately train individuals to do a particular job and which can also be applied to any interservice curriculum development activity.” The model originally contained several steps under its five original phases (analyze, design, develop, implement, and evaluate). The idea was to complete each phase before moving to the next. Subsequent practitioners revised the steps, and eventually the model became more dynamic and interactive than the original hierarchical version. By the mid-1980s, the version familiar today appeared.

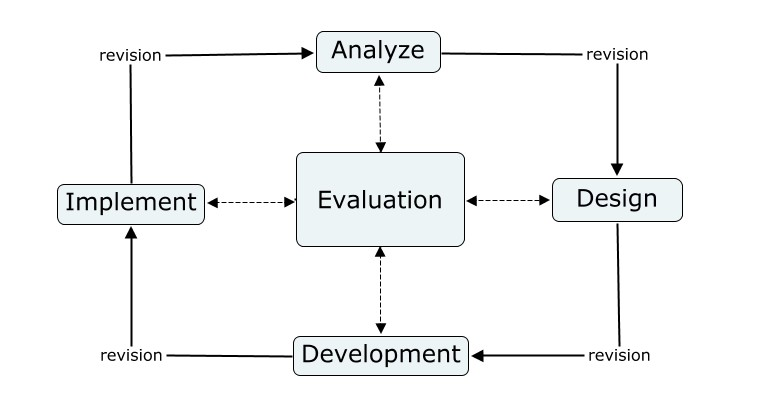
ADDIE Model

The origin of the label itself is obscure, but the underlying ISD concepts come from a model developed for the U.S. armed forces in the mid 1970s. As Branson (1978) recounts, the Center for Educational Technology at Florida State University worked with a branch of the U.S. Army to develop a model, which evolved into the Interservice Procedures for Instructional Systems Development (IPISD), intended for the Army, Navy, Air Force, and Marine Corps. Branson provides a graphic overview of the IPISD, which shows five top-level headings: analyze, design, develop, implement, and control. Virtually all subsequent historical reviews of ID reference this model but, notably, users do not refer to it by the ADDIC acronym. The authors and users refer only to IPISD. Hence, it is clearly not the source of the ADDIE acronym.

== Phases ==
=== Analysis phase ===
The analysis phase clarifies the instructional problems and objectives, and identifies the learning environment and learner's existing knowledge and skills. Questions the analysis phase addresses include:

- Who are the learners and what are their characteristics?
- What is the desired new behavior?
- What types of learning constraints exist?
- What are the delivery options?
- What are the pedagogical considerations?
- What adult learning theory considerations apply?
- What is the timeline for project completion?

The process of asking these questions is often part of a needs analysis. During the needs analysis instructional designers (IDs) will determine constraints and resources in order to fine tune their plan of action.

=== Design phase ===
The design phase deals with learning objectives, assessment instruments, exercises, content, subject matter analysis, lesson planning, and media selection. The design phase should be systematic and specific. Systematic means a logical, orderly method that identifies, develops, and evaluates a set of planned strategies for attaining project goals. Specific means the team must execute each element of the instructional design plan with attention to detail. The design phase may involve writing a design document/design proposal or concept and structure note to aid final development.

=== Development phase ===
In the development phase, instructional designers and developers create and assemble content assets described in the design phase. If e-learning is involved, programmers develop or integrate technologies. Designers create storyboards. Testers debug materials and procedures. The team reviews and revises the project according to feedback. After completing the development of the course material, the designers should conduct an imperative pilot test; this can be carried out by involving key stakeholders and rehearsing the course material.

=== Implementation phase ===
The implementation phase develops procedures for training facilitators and learners. Training facilitators cover the course curriculum, learning outcomes, method of delivery, and testing procedures. Preparation for learners includes training them on new tools (software or hardware) and student registration. Implementation includes evaluation of the design.

=== Evaluation phase ===
The evaluation phase consists of two aspects: formative and summative. Formative evaluation is present in each stage of the ADDIE process, while summative evaluation is conducted on finished instructional programs or products. Donald Kirkpatrick's Four Levels of Learning Evaluation are often utilized during this phase of the ADDIE process.

== Other versions ==
Some institutions have modified the ADDIE model to meet specific needs. For example, the United States Navy created a version they call PADDIE+M. The P phase is the planning phase, which develops project goals, project objectives, budget, and schedules. The M phase is the maintenance phase, which implements life cycle maintenance with continuous improvement methods. This model is gaining acceptance in the United States government as a more complete model of ADDIE. Some organizations have adopted the PADDIE model without the M phase. Pavlis Korres (2010), in her instructional model (ESG Framework), has proposed an expanded version of ADDIE, named ADDIE+M, where Μ = Maintenance of the Learning Community Network after the end of a course. The Maintenance of the Learning Community Network is a modern educational process that supports the continuous educational development of its members with social media and web tools.

== See also ==
- Educational technology
- Instructional technology
- Instructional design
- Design-based learning
- Information technology
