= Association for Educational Communications and Technology =

Academic and professional association

The Association for Educational Communications and Technology (AECT) is an academic and professional association that promotes educational uses of technology. Members provide leadership in the field by promoting scholarship and best practices in instructional technology and educational technology. AECT's headquarters is in Indianapolis, Indiana, USA.

AECT publishes three journals:

- TechTrends, a bimonthly for "leaders in technology and education"
- Educational Technology Research and Development, a bimonthly academic journal
- Journal of Formative Design in Learning, a quarterly academic journal

AECT sponsors the International Student Media Festival (ISMF) and sponsors an annual academic conference.

== See also ==
- J. Michael Spector, past president of AECT
- Christopher Dede
