= Shoval (name) =

Shoval (Hebrew: שובל) is a Hebrew surname and a given name. Notable people with the name include:

== Given name ==
- Shoval Gozlan, Israeli footballer
- Shoval Sofer, Israeli acrobatic gymnast

== Surname ==
- Nadav Shoval (born 1990), Israeli-American entrepreneur
- Ron Shoval (born 1973), Israeli singer
- Ronen Shoval (born 1980), Israeli writer
- Ruby Porat-Shoval, Israeli actress
- Shraga Shoval (born 1958), Israeli professor
- Zalman Shoval, Israeli banker, politician and diplomat
