= Pentawards =

Annual awards in package design

- Date: 2007
- Country: United Kingdom
- Rewards: Bronze, Silver, Gold, Platinum, Diamond Pentawards
- Website: www.pentawards.org

Founded in 2007, the Pentawards is an annual packaging design competition and online hub for packaging designers. Participants include designers, freelancers, design agencies, communication & advertising agencies, brands, packaging manufacturers and students.

== History ==
The Pentawards was created by Jean Jacques Evrard and Brigitte Evrard-Lauwereins, founders and directors of a design agency which joined Carré Noir from 1994 to 1998 and subsequently the Desgrippes Gobé group. At the end of 2006, they left their agency in order to run Pentawards full-time. In October 2016 the Pentawards was acquired by Easyfairs, moving its head office to London, UK.

The pentagon is the official symbol of Pentawards for five reasons. The pentagon is the shape of the historic city centre in Brussels - where the competition was founded, the pentagram is the ancient symbol of beauty, there are five fingers on the hand - an important design tool for humans, the Pentawards has five different award levels and humans have five main senses in which inspiration is taken from.

The purpose of Pentawards is to recognising excellence in design, providing a source of inspiration and connecting the global packaging community through the annual competition, international conferences, digital events, and more.

== Registration and voting ==
Candidates must register on the Pentawards website and submit their creations, providing standardized visuals and in-depth descriptions of the packs. The submissions are grouped into categories and presented to the members of the Jury. The jury's vote takes place without the identity of the participants being revealed. The judging is based on four criteria: quality of design, brand expression, creativity & innovations and emotional connection. In each category, the five packaging designs receiving the overall highest scores are shortlisted. Shortlisted entrants are then asked to provide a physical sample of their packaging (except for concepts). Upon seeing the packaging, the Jury validates and confirms the nomination and prize level obtained: bronze, silver, gold, platinum or diamond.

== Jury ==
The Jury currently includes over 50 international members, including designers or design agency directors and packaging design officials from 25 brands and 26 design agencies like Coca-Cola, Amazon, General Mills, P&G, Pearlfisher, Superunion, and Nestle. The Co-Presidents of the jury are Chloe Templeman (Pearlfisher) and John Glasgow (Vault49). The judging process takes into account international sensitivities, cultures and markets, including a diverse mix of nationalities, ages, genders, educations, skill sets and experiences. Their mandate runs for a maximum of four consecutive years and approximately one third of the jury is renewed every year.

== Awards ==
Five levels of awards are given: diamond, platinum, gold, silver, bronze. The diamond award is given to the packaging design which, across all categories, received the highest number of points. The platinum award goes in each of the 8 major categories, to the packaging designs which received the most points in the given category. The gold, silver and bronze awards are given to the best packaging design in each sub-category. The trophies are representations of the Pentawards logo, a circle with a hollow pentagon in the center. The trophy was first designed and engraved by Belgo-American artist Christian Heckscher.

The current design was updated in 2022 by New York-based agency Established. The Special Award trophies feature varied colours, textures and materials to distinguish them from one another.

== Awards ceremony ==
Each year the Pentawards Gala Ceremony is held in a different location around the world. The event invites all of the winners to celebrate their achievements and receive their prize on stage in front of the global packaging design community.

- 2016: (Shanghai)
- 2017: (Barcelona)
- 2018: (New York)
- 2019: (London)
- 2020: The 2020 Gala Ceremony was held online as part of the Pentawards Festival
- 2021: The 2021 Gala Ceremony was held online.
- 2022: (London)
- 2023: (London)
- 2024: (London)
- 2025: The 2025 Gala Ceremony will be held in Amesterdam (Netherlands)

== Diamond Pentaward winners ==
- 2007: Swinckels beer – Design Bridge agency (Netherlands) – Grimaldi Forum (Monaco)
- 2008: Piper-Heidsieck Upside Down – BETC design agency / Viktor & Rolf (France/Netherlands) – Grimaldi Forum (Monaco)
- 2009: Kleenex slice of summer – Kimberly-Clark|Kimberley-Clark]]) (USA) – Flagey (Brussels)
- 2010: Hoyu3210 – ADK agency (company) (Japan) – Shanghai – Expo 2010
- 2011: Ramlösa – Nine agency (Sweden)–New York Marriott Marquis (Times Square)
- 2012: Coca-Cola Diet Coke – Turner Duckworth agency (USA)- Paris continental Le Grand (Opéra Garnier)
- 2013: Absolut Vodka Absolut Unique – Family Business agency (Sweden) – W Hotel Barcelona
- 2014: Evian The Drop – Danone Group and Grand Angle Design (France) – Palace Hotel Tokyo
- 2015: Beauty Line Marc Jacobs – design by Established NYC (US) – RIBA, Unusual venues in central London, London's West End and Liverpool with RIBA Venues – London
- 2016: Domino's – Jones Knowles Richie Graphic Design Studio – London
- 2017: Starck Paris – Perfumes y Diseño by Philippe Starck – Madrid (Spain)
- 2018: Mutti passata – Auge Design for Mutti spa – Florence (Italy)
- 2019: Xbox Adaptive Controller – Microsoft – US
- 2020: Air Vodka – Air Company – US
- 2021: Eminente Reserva – Moët Hennessy – France
- 2022: Pocket Neck Pillow - Urban Forest Lifestyle Limited - China
- 2023: CASA MARRAZZO 1934 - Auge Design - Italy
- 2024: OGT - This Way Up - UK

== Special Pentawards ==
The organizers have also awarded honorary prizes to individuals, organizations or brands.

- 2008: Herbert M. Meyer (US) – Lifetime achievement
- 2009: Lars Wallentin (Switzerland) – Lifetime achievement
- 2009: Karim Rashid (USA) – Exceptional creativity
- 2010: JPDA (Japan Packaging Design Association) (Japan) – 50 years of outstanding action
- 2011: Marry Lewis (UK) – Exceptional creativity
- 2011: The Coca-Cola bottle through the years (US) – Branding consistency and creativity
- 2012: Yoshio Kato (Japan) – Lifetime achievement
- 2012: The Veuve Clicquot Ponsardin brand (France) – Branding consistency and creativity* 2013: The Absolut Vodka brand (Sweden) – Branding consistency and creativity
- 2014: The Milka brand Mondelez – Branding consistency and creativity
- 2015: The Johnnie Walker brand (Diageo) (UK) – Branding consistency and creativity
- 2015: Kevin Shaw, founder of Stranger & Stranger (UK) – Exceptional creativity
- 2016: Coley Porter Bell (UK) – Luxepack Special Prize
- 2016: Jones Knowles Ritchie (UK) – ESKO Special Prize
- 2017: Perfumes y Diseño (Spain) – ESKO Special Prize
- 2018: You Chen, Hubei University of Technology (China) – NXT-GEN, Best Student Work
- 2019: Backbone Branding (Armenia) – Design Agency of the Year
- 2019: PepsiCo (USA) – Visionary Award & People’s Choice awards
- 2019: Natalia Radnaeva and Anna Kondratova, HSE Art & Design School (Russia) – NXT-GEN, Best Student Work
- 2020: Caparo Design Crew (Greece) – Best Newcomer of the Year
- 2020: Backbone Branding (Armenia) – Design Agency of the Year
- 2020: XiongBo Deng, ShenZhen Lingyun Creative Packaging Design Co., Ltd, (China) – Designer of the Year
- 2020: Robert Dadashev, British School of Art & Design, (Russia) – NXT-GEN, Best Student Work

== Publications ==
Every two years, the winning entries appear in a reference book published by Taschen and available in French, English, German, Spanish and Portuguese.

- 2010: The Package Design Book n°1
- 2012: The Package Design Book n°2
- 2014: The Package Design Book n°3
- 2016: The Package Design Book n°4
- 2018: The Package Design Book n°5
- 2020: The Package Design Book n°6
- 2023: The Package Design Book n°7
- 2025: The Package Design Book n°8

== Events ==
Besides its annual competition, Pentawards regularly holds events such as international conferences, panel discussions, online webinars, and design brunch events. On top of this, winning entries are showcased in different countries through Winners’ Exhibits and partners events.
