= Do it yourself =

Building, modifying, or repairing, without the aid of experts or professionals

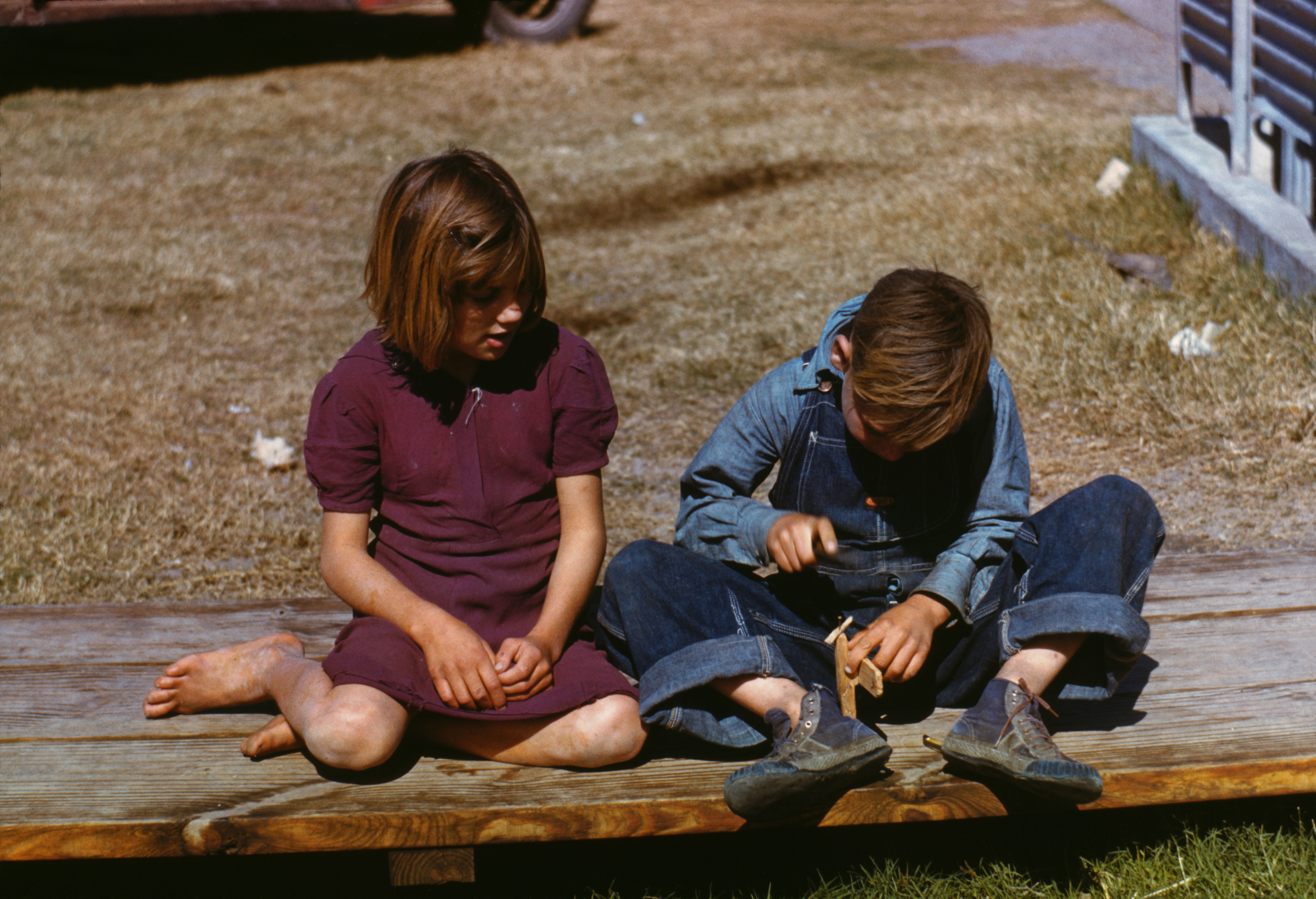
Boy building a model airplane, Texas, 1942 (photograph by Arthur Rothstein for the Farm Security Administration)

"Do it yourself" ("DIY") is the practice of undertaking the construction, modification, or repair of objects or spaces independently, without the assistance of qualified professionals or certified experts. Academic research has described DIY as a behavior in which "individuals use raw and semi-raw materials and parts to produce, transform, or reconstruct material possessions, including those drawn from the natural environment (e.g., landscaping)". DIY behavior can be driven by various motivations previously categorized as market-based (economic benefits, product unavailability, poor product quality, need for customization), and identity-enhancing (craftsmanship, empowerment, community seeking, uniqueness).

The term "do-it-yourself" has been associated with consumers since at least 1912 primarily in the domain of home improvement and maintenance activities. The phrase "do it yourself" had come into common usage (in standard English) by the 1950s, in reference to the emergence of a trend of people undertaking home improvement and various other small craft and construction projects as both a creative-recreational and cost-saving activity.

Subsequently, the term DIY has taken on a broader meaning that covers a wide range of skill sets. DIY has been described as a "self-made culture"; one of designing, creating, customizing and repairing items or things without any special training. DIY has grown to become a social concept with people sharing ideas, designs, techniques, methods and finished projects with one another either online or in person.

DIY can be seen as a cultural reaction in modern technological society to increasing academic specialization and economic specialization which brings people into contact with only a tiny focus area within the larger context, positioning DIY as a venue for holistic engagement. DIY ethic is the ethic of self-sufficiency through completing tasks without the aid of a paid expert. The DIY ethic promotes the idea that anyone is capable of performing a variety of tasks rather than relying on paid specialists.

== History ==
Italian archaeologists have unearthed the ruins of a 6th-century BC Greek structure in southern Italy. The ruins appeared to come with detailed assembly instructions and are being called an "ancient IKEA building". The structure was a temple-like building discovered at Torre Satriano, near the southern city of Potenza, in Basilicata. This region was recognized as a place where local people mingled with Greeks who had settled along the southern coast known as Magna Graecia and in Sicily from the 8th century BC onwards. Christopher Smith, director of the British School at Rome, said that the discovery was, "the clearest example yet found of mason's marks of the time. It looks as if someone was instructing others how to mass-produce components and put them together in this way." Much like our modern instruction booklets, various sections of the luxury building were inscribed with coded symbols showing how the pieces slotted together. The characteristics of these inscriptions indicate they date back to around the 6th century BC, which tallies with the architectural evidence suggested by the decoration. The building was built by Greek artisans coming from the Spartan colony of Taranto in Apulia.

In North America, there was a DIY magazine publishing niche in the first half of the twentieth century. Magazines such as Popular Mechanics (founded in 1902) and Mechanix Illustrated (founded in 1928) offered a way for readers to keep current on useful practical skills, techniques, tools, and materials. As many readers lived in rural or semi-rural regions, initially much of the material related to their needs on the farm or in a small town. In addition, authors such as F. J. Christopher began to become heavy advocates for do-it-yourself projects.

By the 1950s, DIY became common usage with the emergence of people undertaking home improvement projects, construction projects and smaller crafts. Artists began to fight against mass production and mass culture by claiming to be self-made. However, DIY practices also responded to geopolitical tensions, such as in the form of home-made Cold War nuclear fallout shelters, and the dark aesthetics and nihilist discourse in punk fanzines in the 1970s and onwards in the shadow of rising unemployment and social tensions. In the 1960s and 1970s, books and TV shows about the DIY movement and techniques on building and home decoration began appearing. By the 1990s, the DIY movement felt the impact of the digital age with the rise of the internet. With computers and the internet becoming mainstream, increased accessibility to the internet has led to more households undertaking DIY methods. Platforms, such as YouTube or Instagram, provide people the opportunity to share their creations and instruct others on how to replicate DIY techniques in their own home.

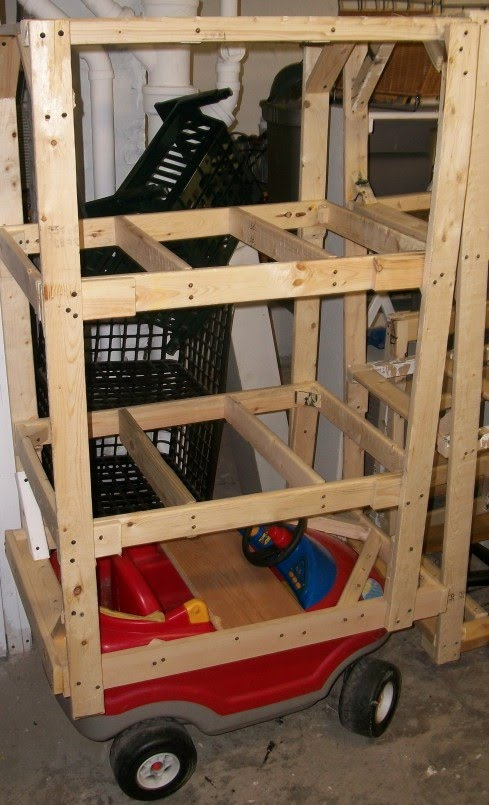
Shelves attached to a toy vehicle

The DIY movement is a re-introduction (often to urban and suburban dwellers) of the old pattern of personal involvement and use of skills in the upkeep of a house or apartment, making clothes; maintenance of cars, computers, websites; or any material aspect of living. The philosopher Alan Watts (from the "Houseboat Summit" panel discussion in a 1967 edition of the San Francisco Oracle) reflected a growing sentiment:

Our educational system, in its entirety, does nothing to give us any kind of material competence. In other words, we don't learn how to cook, how to make clothes, how to build houses, how to make love, or to do any of the absolutely fundamental things of life. The whole education that we get for our children in school is entirely in terms of abstractions. It trains you to be an insurance salesman or a bureaucrat, or some kind of cerebral character.

In the 1970s, DIY spread through the North American population of college and recent-college-graduate age groups. In part, this movement involved the renovation of affordable, rundown older homes. But, it also related to various projects expressing the social and environmental vision of the 1960s and early 1970s. The young visionary Stewart Brand, working with friends and family, and initially using the most basic of typesetting and page-layout tools, developed the first edition of The Whole Earth Catalog (subtitled Access to Tools) in late 1968. The venture was partially financed by friend and mentor Dick Raymond. Raymond's non-profit, the Portola Institute, published the Catalog, and the surprising success of editions in the 1970s led to a distribution arrangement with the New York publisher Random House.

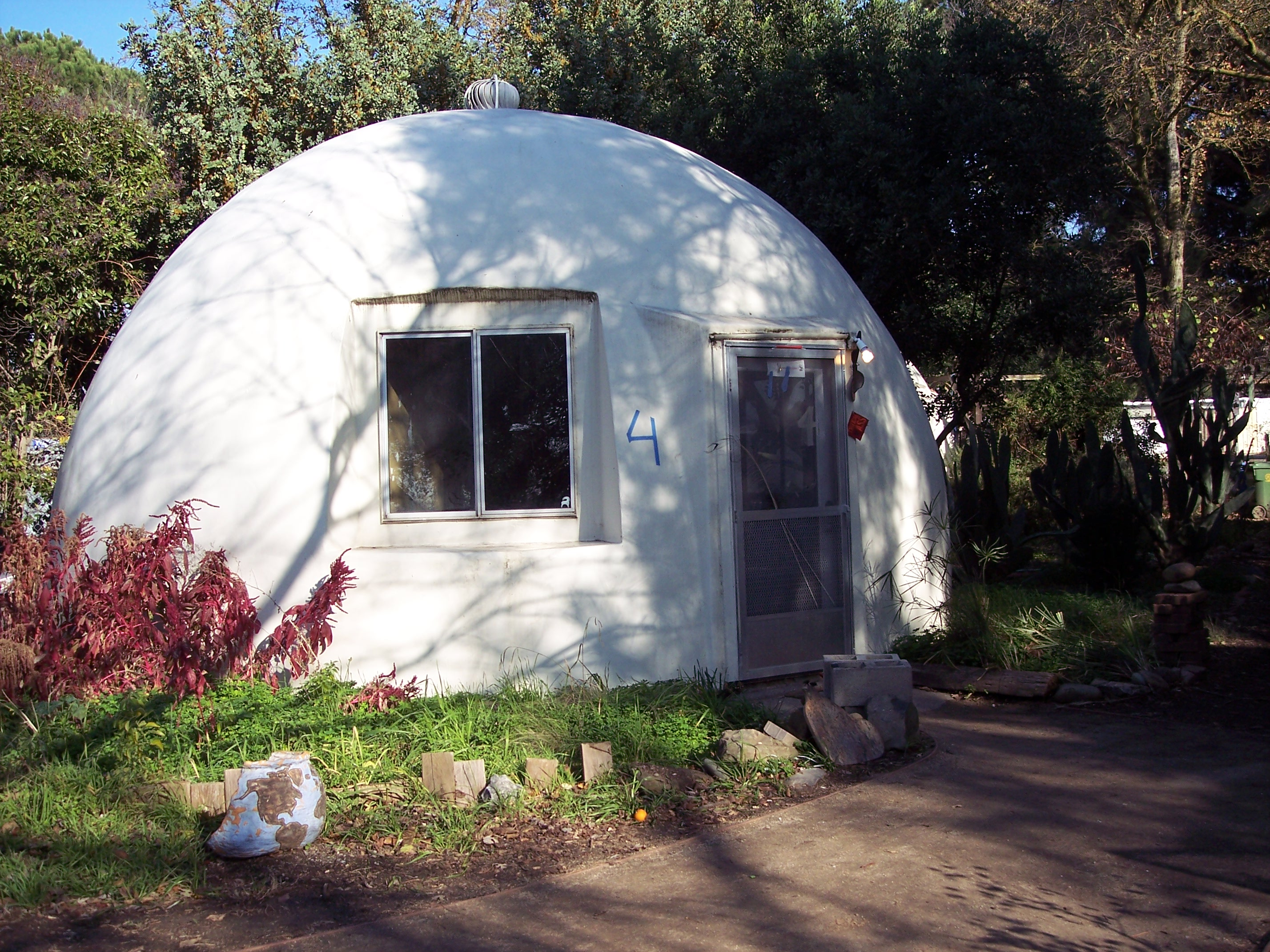
Fiberglass dome house, California, in style of the Whole Earth Catalog building techniques

The first Catalog, and its successors, used a broad definition of the term "tools." There were informational tools, such as books (often technical in nature), professional journals, courses and classes. There were specialized, designed items, such as carpentry and stonemasonry tools, garden tools, welding equipment, chainsaws, fiberglass materials and so on – even early personal computers. The designer J. Baldwin served as technology editor and wrote many of the reviews of fabrication tools, tools for working soil, etc. The Catalog's publication both emerged from and spurred the great wave of experimentalism, convention-breaking, and do-it-yourself attitude of the late 1960s. Often copied, the Catalog appealed to a wide cross-section of people in North America and had a broad influence.

DIY home improvement books burgeoned in the 1970s, first created as collections of magazine articles. An early, extensive line of DIY how-to books were created by Sunset Books, based upon previously published articles from their magazine, Sunset, based in California. Time-Life, Better Homes and Gardens, Balcony Garden Web and other publishers soon followed suit.

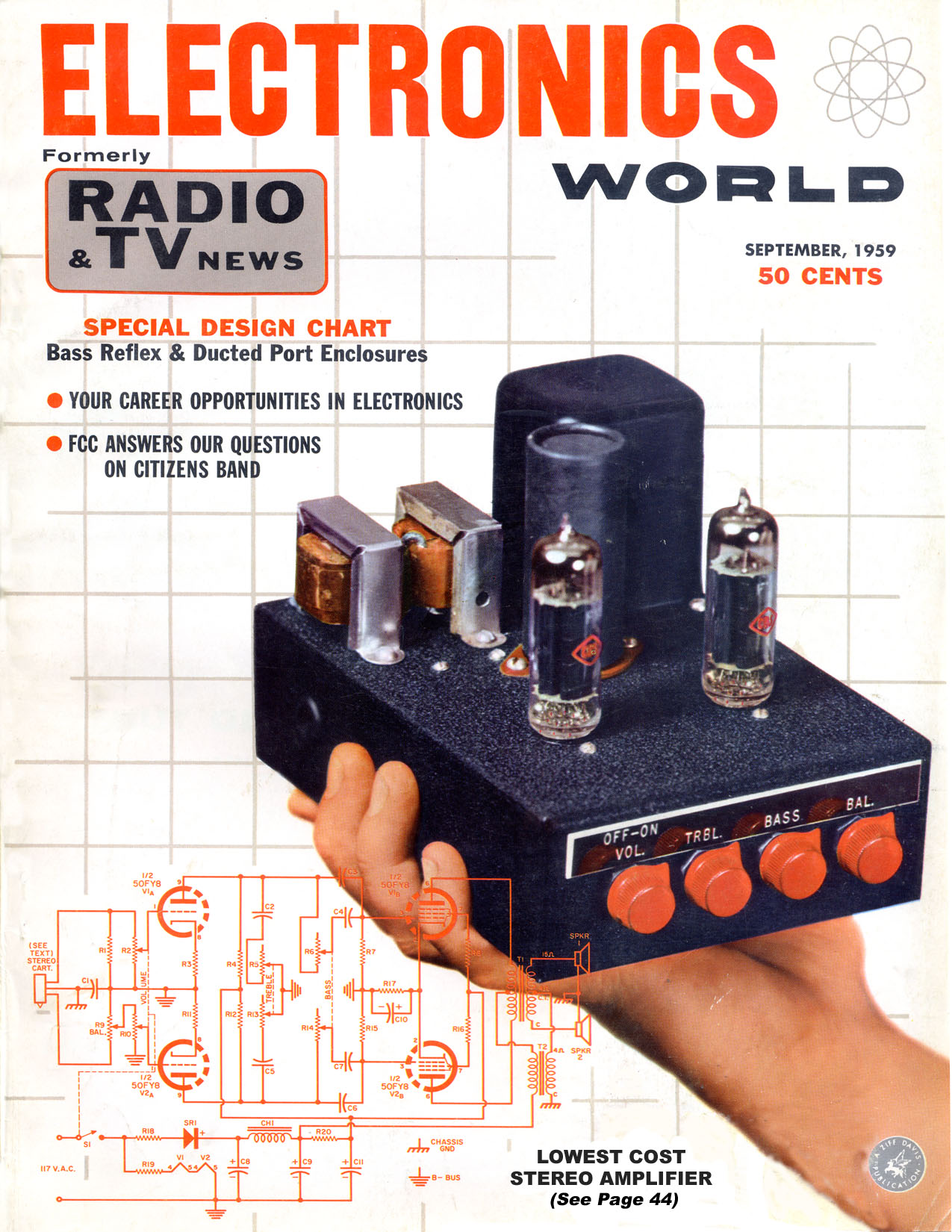
Electronics World 1959, home assembled amplifier

In the mid-1990s, DIY home-improvement content began to find its way onto the World Wide Web. HouseNet was the earliest bulletin-board style site where users could share information. Since the late 1990s, DIY has exploded on the Web through thousands of sites.

In the 1970s, when home video (VCRs) came along, DIY instructors quickly grasped its potential for demonstrating processes by audio-visual means. In 1979, the PBS television series This Old House, starring Bob Vila, premiered and spurred a DIY television revolution. The show was immensely popular, educating people on how to improve their living conditions (and the value of their house) without the expense of paying someone else to do (as much of) the work. In 1994, the HGTV Network cable television channel was launched in the United States and Canada, followed in 1999 by the DIY Network cable television channel. Both were launched to appeal to the growing percentage of North Americans interested in DIY topics, from home improvement to knitting. Such channels have multiple shows revealing how to stretch one's budget to achieve professional-looking results (Design Cents, Design on a Dime, etc.) while doing the work yourself. Toolbelt Diva specifically caters to female DIYers.

Beyond magazines and television, the scope of home improvement DIY continues to grow online where most mainstream media outlets now have extensive DIY-focused informational websites such as This Old House, Martha Stewart, Hometalk, and the DIY Network. These are often extensions of their magazine or television brand. The growth of independent online DIY resources is also spiking. The number of homeowners who blog about their experiences continues to grow, along with DIY websites from smaller organizations.

In the 21st century, DIY culture has expanded through online video platforms, where creators share tutorials and creative projects. For example, New Zealand YouTuber David Jones has produced DIY cardboard builds.

== Fashion ==
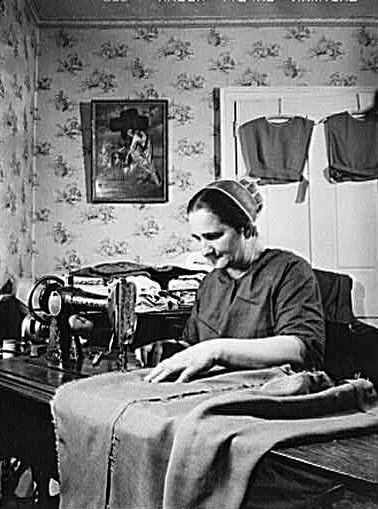
Mennonite woman dressmaking (1942)

DIY is prevalent amongst the fashion community, with ideas being shared on social media, such as YouTube, about clothing, jewellery, makeup, and hairstyles. Techniques include distressing and bleaching jeans, redesigning old shirts, and studding denim.

The concept of DIY has also emerged within the art and design community. The terms Hacktivist, Craftivist, or maker have been used to describe creatives working within a DIY framework (Busch). Otto von Busch describes 'Hacktivism' as "[including] the participant in the process of making, [to give] rise to new attitudes within the 'maker' or collaborator." Busch suggests that by engaging in participatory forms of fashion, consumers are able to step away from the idea of "mass-homogenized 'Mc-Fashion'" as fashion Hacktivism allows consumers to play a more active role in engaging with the clothes they wear.

== Subculture ==
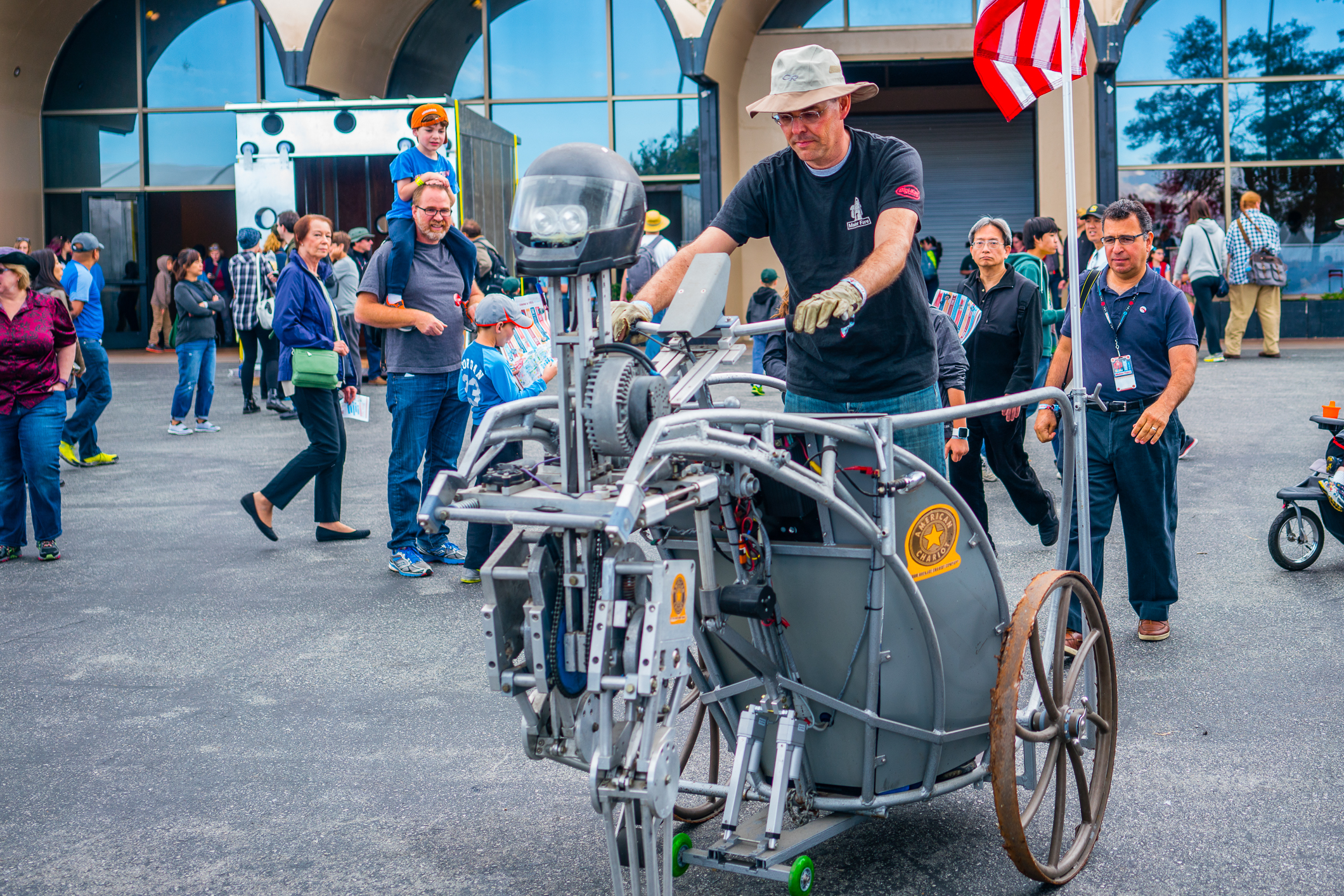
DIY vehicle at Maker Faire, San Mateo, 2016

DIY as a subculture was brought forward by the punk movement of the 1970s. Instead of traditional means of bands reaching their audiences through large music labels, bands began recording, manufacturing albums and merchandise, booking their own tours, and creating opportunities for smaller bands to get wider recognition through repetitive low-cost DIY touring. The burgeoning zine movement took up coverage of and promotion of the underground punk scenes, and significantly altered the way fans interacted with musicians. Zines quickly branched off from being hand-made music magazines to become more personal; they quickly became one of the youth culture's gateways to DIY culture. This led to tutorial zines showing others how to make their own shirts, posters, zines, books, food, etc.

The terms "DIY" and "do-it-yourself" are also used to describe:

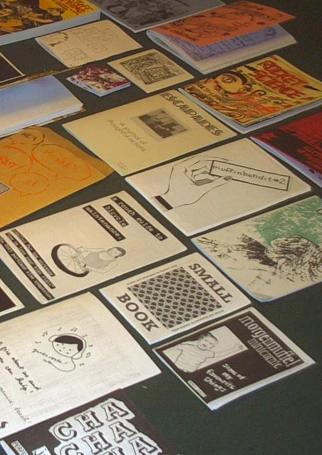
Zines, London

- Self-publishing books, zines, doujinshi, and alternative comics
- Bands or solo artists releasing their music on self-funded record labels.
- Trading of mixtapes as part of cassette culture
- The international mail art network which circumvents galleries and official art institutions by creating a precursor to social networking.
- Homemade stuff based on the principles of "Recycle, Reuse & Reduce" (the 3R's). A common term in many environmental movements encouraging people to reuse old, used objects found in their homes and to recycle simple materials like paper.
- Crafts such as knitting, crochet, sewing, handmade jewelry, ceramics
- Self-built housing, for instance Tasmanian House projects in Australia
- Designing business cards, invitations and so on
- Creating punk or indie musical merchandise through the use of recycling thrift store or discarded materials, usually decorated with art applied by silk screen.
- Independent game development and game modding
- Contemporary roller derby
- Skateparks built by skateboarders without paid professional assistance
- Building musical electronic circuits such as the Atari Punk Console and create circuit bending noise machines from vintage children toys.
- Modifying ("modding") common products to allow extended or unintended uses, commonly referred to by the internet term, "life-hacking". Related to jury-rigging i.e. sloppy/ unlikely mods
- Hobby electronics or in amateur radio equipment producing.
- DIY science: using open-source hardware to make scientific equipment to conduct citizen science or simply low-cost traditional science
  - Using low-cost single-board computers, such as Arduino and Raspberry Pi, as embedded systems with various applications
  - DIY bio

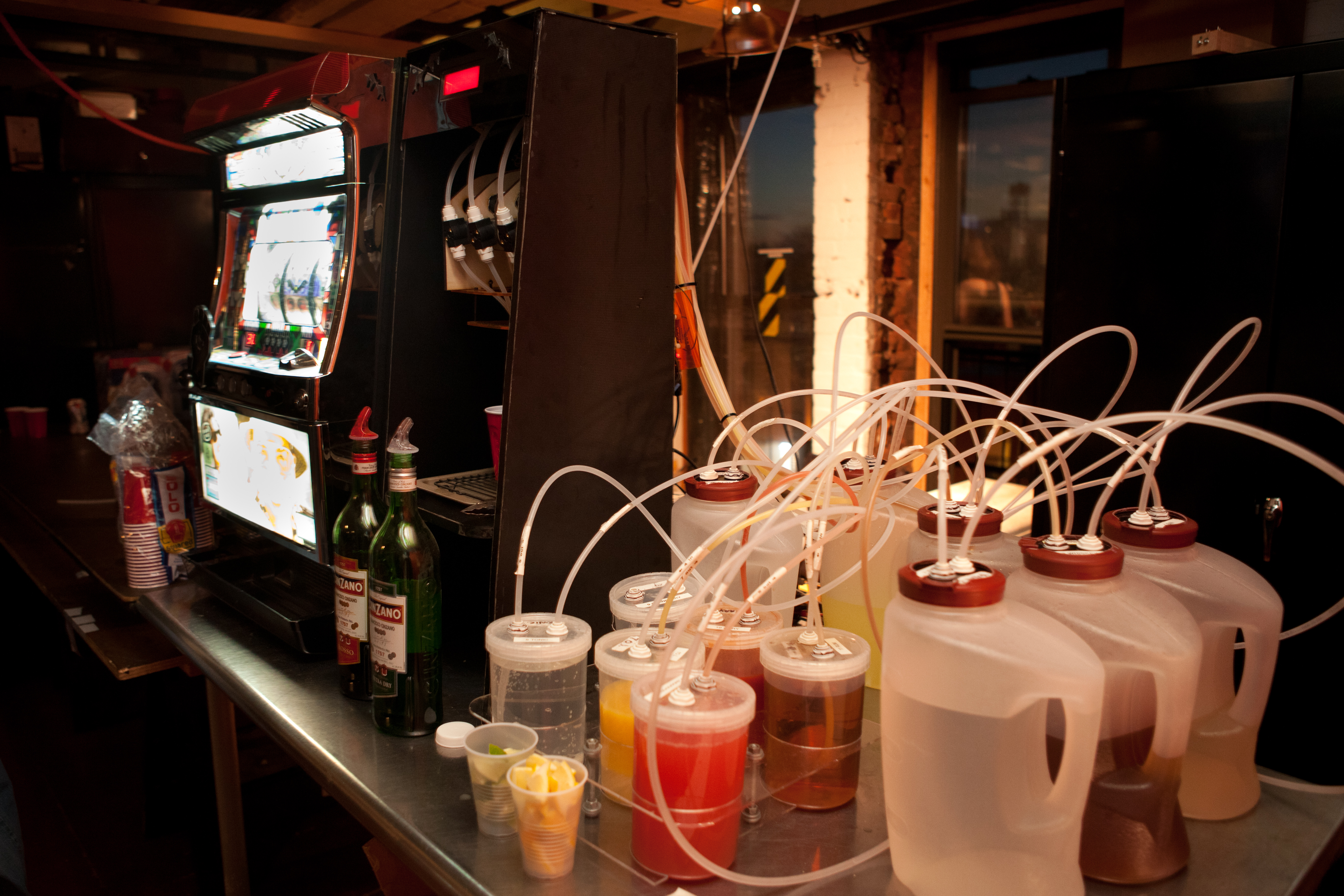
Drink mixing robot

- Use of a custom Linux distribution catered for a specific purpose.
- Building a custom synthesizer.
- Use of FPGAs.
- Privately made firearms
- Taxidermyizing the scores of hunting or fishing expeditions.

=== Music ===
Much contemporary DIY music has its origins in the late 1970s punk rock subculture. It developed as a way to circumnavigate the corporate mainstream music industry. By controlling the entire production and distribution chain, DIY bands attempt to develop a closer relationship between artists and fans. The DIY ethic gives total control over the final product without need to compromise with record major labels.

According to the punk aesthetic, one can express oneself and produce moving and serious works with limited means. Arguably, the earliest example of this attitude was the punk music scene of the 1970s.

More recently, the orthodox understanding that DIY originates in 1970s punk, with its clearest practices being in the self-produced 7" single and self-published fanzines, has been challenged. As George McKay asks in the title of his 2023 article: 'Was punk DIY? Is DIY punk?' McKay argues instead for what he terms a 'depunking' of DIY.

Riot grrrl, associated with third-wave feminism, also adopted the core values of the DIY punk ethic by leveraging creative ways of communication through zines and other projects.

Adherents of the DIY punk ethic also work collectively. For example, punk impresario David Ferguson's CD Presents was a DIY concert production, recording studio, and record label network.

=== Film ===
A form of independent filmmaking characterized by low budgets, minimal crews, and simple props using whatever is available.

=== By country ===
As a means of adaptation during the Cuban Special Period times of economic crisis, resolver ("to resolve") became an important part of Cuban culture. Resolver refers to a spirit of resourcefulness and do-it-yourself problem solving.

==== India ====
Jugaad is a colloquial Hindi, Bengali, Marathi, Punjabi, Sindhi and Urdu word, which refers to a non-conventional, frugal innovation, often termed a "hack". It could also refer to an innovative fix or a simple work-around, a solution that bends the rules, or a resource that can be used in such a way. It is also often used to signify creativity: to make existing things work, or to create new things with meager resources.

==== United States ====
Rasquache is the English form of the Spanish term rascuache, originally with a negative connotation in Mexico it was recontextualized by the Mexican and Chicano arts movement to describe a specific artistic aesthetic, Rasquachismo, suited to overcoming material and professional limitations faced by artists in the movement.

== See also ==
- Bricolage
- Circuit bending
- Edupunk
- Hackerspace
- Handyman
- Instructables
- Junk box
- Kludge
- Mail art
- Maker culture
- Number 8 wire
- Open design
- Power tool
- Prosumer
- Ready-to-assemble furniture
- 3D printing

=== Subculture links ===
- Punk subculture
- Basement show
- Bricolage
- Cassette culture
- Circuit bending
- Critical making
- D.I.Y. or Die: How to Survive as an Independent Artist
- Edupunk
- Guerrilla gig
- Hackerspace
- Homebuilt aircraft
- Individualism
- Infoshop
- Maker culture
- Mumblecore
- Off-the-grid
- Remodernist film
- Self-publishing
- Underground comix
- White box (computer hardware)
- Solarpunk
