= AltaIR Capital =

American venture capital company

- Type: Limited partnership
- Industry: Venture capital / private equity
- Founder: Igor Ryabenkiy
- Headquarters: San Francisco, United States
- Area served: North America, Europe, Israel
- Services: venture capital
- Website: www.altair.vc

AltaIR Capital, is an American venture capital company that was founded by Igor Ryabenkiy, an angel investor.

As of 2021, the company had $600M in assets under management, including investments in tech startups.

== History ==
Igor Ryabenkiy founded AltaIR Capital in 2005.

In 2015, Ryabenkiy created AltaClub, a business angel club. AltaClub's portfolio was $120 million in 2020 and has grown to $650 million in 2021.

== Funds ==
AltaIR Capital Fund I began in 2012 with $20M in capital backing. The fund invested in the pre-seed and seed stages of SaaS, FinTech, HealthTech, InsureTech, and D2C products and marketplaces.

In 2014 AltaIR Capital Fund II was founded with $100 million to support startups in their pre-seed and Series A rounds.

Launched in 2019 with $200M in capital, AltaIR Capital Fund III, continues focusing on Productivity Tools, FinTech, InsureTech, Future of Work, Digital Health.

In March 2021 AltaIR Capital launched the AltaIR ABO for 300 million. The entity works as an opportunity investor for late stage projects.

In 2022 AltaIR Capital sponsored the Support Ukrainian Startups NOW program launched by the FREE Ukraine Foundation and the Ukrainian Venture Capital and Private Equity Association (UVCA).

== Investments and exits ==
AltaIR Capital has invested in startups in early and growing stages.

Among them are unicorns in the early stages:

- Miro (online platform for visual collaboration)
- Deel (privately held payroll and compliance provider)
- PandaDoc (software company that provides SaaS software)
- OpenWeb (social engagement platform)
- Turing (service for evaluating the competence of IT professionals, recruiting them, and grouping them into remote teams)

Other invested startups:

- Verbit AI (provider of cloud and AI-based natural language processing platform to develop speech recognition applications)
- Sunbit (is a «buy now pay later» technology of local service providers and retailers)
- Jeeves (fintech company that focuses on expense management and payments)
- Babylist (marketplace and commerce destination for baby)
- Lilibank (a startup building banking products)
- EquityBee (an online platform for helping startup employees exercise their stock options and receive pre-IPO shares)
- Squire (a small business management platform serving the men's grooming segment)
- Respond.io (an AI-powered business messaging platform founded by Gerardo Salandra)

AltaIR Capital has completed multiple returns:

- FlexEngage (a service that helps retailers personalize the post-purchase period)
- Gurushots (photography game)
- Klear (social intelligence platform)
- This is L (social enterprise and public-benefit corporation that makes organic personal care products)
- Unomy (sales & marketing intelligence platform)
- Hometalk (online DIY publisher)

== Awards and recognition ==
In 2016, CB Insight recognized AltaIR Capital as the most active venture capital investor in Delaware.

In 2019, and 2022 PitchBook Data ranked AltaIR Capital No. 2 among the most active VCs in the Israeli market.

In 2025, AltaIR Capital was ranked among the Top 2.5% venture capital firms in EMEA by Dealroom as part of its Power Law Investor Ranking, which evaluates over 22,000 investors based on portfolio outcomes.
