= Touch user interface =

A touch user interface (TUI) is a computer-pointing technology based upon the sense of touch (haptics). Whereas a graphical user interface (GUI) relies upon the sense of sight, a TUI enables not only the sense of touch to innervate and activate computer-based functions, it also allows the user, particularly those with visual impairments, an added level of interaction based upon tactile or Braille input.

== Technology ==
Generally, the TUI requires pressure or presence with a switch located outside of the printed paper. Not to be confused with electronic paper endeavors, the TUI requires the printed pages to act as a template or overlay to a switch array. By interacting with the switch through touch or presence, an action is innervated. The switching sensor cross-references with a database. The database retains the correct pathway to retrieve the associated digital content or launch the appropriate application.

TUI icons may be used to indicate to the reader of the printed page what action will occur upon interacting with a particular position on the printed page.

Turning pages and interacting with new pages that may have the same touch points as previous or subsequent pages, a z-axis may be used to indicate the plane of activity. Z-axis can be offset around the boundary of the page. When the unique z-axis is interacted with, x,y-axis can have identical touch points as other pages. For example, 1,1,1 indicates a z-axis of 1 (page 1) and the x,y-axis is 1,1. However, turning the page and pressing a new z-axis, say page 2, and then the same x,y-axis content position as page 1, gains the following coordinate structure: 2,1,1.

An integrated circuit (IC) is located either within the printed material or within an enclosure that cradles the printed material. This IC receives a signal when a switch is innervated. The firmware located within the IC communicates via Universal Serial Bus (USBC) either connected to a cable, or using a Wireless protocol adapter to a reference database that can reside on media within a computer or appliance. Upon receipt of the coordinate structure from the firmware, the database correlates the position with a pre-determined link or pathway to digital content or execution command for an application. After correlating the link with the pathway, a signal is sent to retrieve and render the terminal of the path.

== Educational mandate ==
In the United States, legislation took effect in December 2006, that requires educational publishers in the K-12 education industry to provide a National Instructional Materials Accessibility Standard (NIMAS). In essence, educational publishers must provide an inclusive experience to those students who are blind. If they are unable to provide this experience, they are required to provide the digital content source files to a clearing house that will convert the materials into an accessible experience for the student. The TUI has the promise of enabling the publishers to maintain control of their content while providing an inclusive, tactile, or Braille experience to students who are visually impaired. Further, using a Braille approach may serve to help enhance Braille literacy while meeting the mandates of NIMAS.

== See also ==
- Gesture recognition
- Human–computer interaction
- Multi-touch
- Multi-touch gestures
- Natural user interface
- Surface computing
- Touchscreen
- TouchWiz
