= Instructional theory =

Theory that offers explicit guidance on how to better help people learn and develop

An instructional theory is "a theory that offers explicit guidance on how to better help people learn and develop." It provides insights about what is likely to happen and why with respect to different kinds of teaching and learning activities while helping indicate approaches for their evaluation. Instructional designers focus on how to best structure material and instructional behavior to facilitate learning.

== Development ==
Originating in the United States in the late 1970s, instructional theory is influenced by three basic theories in educational thought: behaviorism, the theory that helps us understand how people conform to predetermined standards; cognitivism, the theory that learning occurs through mental associations; and constructivism, the theory explores the value of human activity as a critical function of gaining knowledge. Instructional theory is heavily influenced by the 1956 work of Benjamin Bloom, a University of Chicago professor, and the results of his Taxonomy of Education Objectives—one of the first modern codifications of the learning process. One of the first instructional theorists was Robert M. Gagne, who in 1965 published Conditions of Learning for the Florida State University's Department of Educational Research.

== Definition ==
Instructional theory is different than learning theory. A learning theory describes how learning takes place, and an instructional theory prescribes how to better help people learn. Learning theories often inform instructional theory, and three general theoretical stances take part in this influence: behaviorism (learning as response acquisition), cognitivism (learning as knowledge acquisition), and constructivism (learning as knowledge construction). Instructional theory helps us create conditions that increases the probability of learning. Its goal is understanding the instructional system and to improve the process of instruction.

== Overview ==
Instructional theories identify what instruction or teaching should be like. It outlines strategies that an educator may adopt to achieve the learning objectives. Instructional theories are adapted based on the educational content and more importantly the learning style of the students. They are used as teaching guidelines/tools by teachers/trainers to facilitate learning. Instructional theories encompass different instructional methods, models and strategies.

David Merrill's First Principles of Instruction discusses universal methods of instruction, situational methods and core ideas of the post-industrial paradigm of instruction.

Universal Methods of Instruction:

- Task-Centered Principle - instruction should use a progression of increasingly complex whole tasks.
- Demonstration Principle - instruction should guide learners through a skill and engage peer discussion/demonstration.
- Application Principle - instruction should provide intrinsic or corrective feedback and engage peer-collaboration.
- Activation Principle - instruction should build upon prior knowledge and encourage learners to acquire a structure for organizing new knowledge.
- Integration Principle - instruction should engage learners in peer-critiques and synthesizing newly acquired knowledge.

Situational Methods:

based on different approaches to instruction

- Role play
- Synectics
- Mastery learning
- Direct instruction
- Discussion
- Conflict resolution
- Peer learning
- Experiential learning
- Problem-based learning
- Simulation-based learning

based on different learning outcomes:

- Knowledge
- Comprehension
- Application
- Analysis
- Synthesis
- Evaluation
- Affective development
- Integrated learning

Core ideas for the Post-industrial Paradigm of Instruction:

- Learner centered vs. teacher centered instruction – with respect to the focus, instruction can be based on the capability and style of the learner or the teacher.
- Learning by doing vs. teacher presenting – Students often learn more by doing rather than simply listening to instructions given by the teacher.
- Attainment based vs. time based progress – The instruction can either be based on the focus on the mastery of the concept or the time spent on learning the concept.
- Customized vs. standardized instruction – The instruction can be different for different learners or the instruction can be given in general to the entire classroom
- Criterion referenced vs. norm referenced instruction – Instruction related to different types of evaluations.
- Collaborative vs. individual instruction – Instruction can be for a team of students or individual students.
- Enjoyable vs. unpleasant instructions – Instructions can create a pleasant learning experience or a negative one (often to enforce discipline). Teachers must take care to ensure positive experiences.

Four tasks of Instructional theory:

- Knowledge selection
- Knowledge sequence
- Interaction management
- Setting of interaction environment

== Critiques ==
Paulo Freire's work appears to critique instructional approaches that adhere to the knowledge acquisition stance, and his work Pedagogy of the Oppressed has had a broad influence over a generation of American educators with his critique of various "banking" models of education and analysis of the teacher-student relationship.

Freire explains, "Narration (with the teacher as narrator) leads the students to memorize mechanically the narrated content. Worse yet, it turns them into "containers", into "receptacles" to be "filled" by the teacher. The more completely she fills the receptacles, the better a teacher she is. The more meekly the receptacles permit themselves to be filled, the better students they are." In this way he explains educator creates an act of depositing knowledge in a student. The student thus becomes a repository of knowledge. Freire explains that this system that diminishes creativity and knowledge suffers. Knowledge, according to Freire, comes about only through the learner by inquiry and pursuing the subjects in the world and through interpersonal interaction.

Freire further states, "In the banking concept of education, knowledge is a gift bestowed by those who consider themselves knowledgeable upon those whom they consider to know nothing. Projecting an absolute ignorance onto others, a characteristic of the ideology of oppression, negates education and knowledge as processes of inquiry. The teacher presents himself to his students as their necessary opposite; by considering their ignorance absolute, he justifies his own existence. The students, alienated like the slave in the Hegelian dialectic, accept their ignorance as justifying the teacher's existence—but, unlike the slave, they never discover that they educate the teacher." Freire then offered an alternative stance and wrote, "The raison d'etre of libertarian education, on the other hand, lies in its drive towards reconciliation. Education must begin with the solution of the teacher-student contradiction, by reconciling the poles of the contradiction so that both are simultaneously teachers and students."

In the article, "A process for the critical analysis of instructional theory", the authors use an ontology-building process to review and analyze concepts across different instructional theories. Here are their findings:

- Concepts exist in theoretical writing that theorists do not address directly.
- These tacit concepts, which supply the ontological categories, enable a more detailed comparison of theories beyond specific terminologies.
- Divergences between theories can be concealed behind common terms used by different theorists.
- A false sense of understanding often arises from a cursory, uncritical reading of the theories.
- Discontinuities and gaps are revealed within the theoretical literature when the tacit concepts are elicited.

== See also ==
- Educational technology – Use of technology in education to enhance learning and teaching (the use of electronic educational technology is also called e-learning)
- Edupunk – Teaching method
- Instructional design – Process for design and development of learning resources
- Teaching method – Principles and methods used by teachers to enable student learning
- Training Within Industry – Service for on the job training in industry was developed during WWII and is still in use around the world
- Behaviorism – Systematic approach to understanding the behavior of humans and other animals
- Cognitivism – Theoretical framework for understanding the mind
- Constructivism – Theory of knowledge
