= Nadab =

Nadab or Nadav may refer to:

== People ==
- Nadab (son of Aaron), Biblical figure, eldest son of Aaron the High Priest of Israel. Nadab means "Noble" in Hebrew.
- Nadab of Israel, king of the northern Kingdom of Israel, reigned c. 901-900 BCE
- Nadav Eyal, Israeli journalist
- Nadav Guedj, Israeli singer and actor
- Nadav Kander, Israeli photographer
- Nadav Lapid, Israeli screenwriter and film director
- Nadav Na'aman, Israeli archaeologist and historian
- Nadav Safran, American expert in Arab and Middle East politics (1925–2003)
- Nadav Shoval, Israeli entrepreneur (born 1990)
- Nadav Tamir, Israeli diplomat

== Places ==
- Nădab (Hungarian: Nadab), a village administered by Chişineu-Criş town, Arad County, Romania
