= Elizabeth Anyakoha =

Professor of home economics education in Nigeria

- Born: 1948 (age 77–78)
- Education: University of Nigeria
- Known for: Home Economics Education

Elizabeth Anyakoha (born 1948) is the first professor of home economics education in Nigeria. Anyakoha is known for her landmark in the field of Home Economics Education. She graduated from the University of Nigeria in 1979.

== Biography ==
She obtained her M.Ed and Ph.D in 1982 and 1986, respectively, in Curriculum Studies from the University of Nigeria, Nsukka. Anyakoha has developed curricular and instructional materials for home economics and other vocational education programmes at various levels of education (primary, secondary and tertiary) in Nigeria.

Anyakoha has broken grounds in terms of record being first in all that she does. She was the first female Head of Department of Vocational Teacher Education, University of Nigeria. Anyakoha is the Founder of Home Economics Journal, Home Economics Research Association of Nigeria (HERAN) in 2000 and Family and child Development Centre. She has served in many capabilities both within the university community and different public bodies. She has served as consultant to National University commission (NUC), Nigeria Education Research and Development Commission (NERDC), National Commission for Colleges of Education (NCCE), UNICEF, UNESCO, UNDP, Central Bank of NIgeria (CBN) and World Bank.

As a professor of home economics education, she has stressed the need for government to industrialized home economics to promote indigenous skills with a view to create employment opportunities.
