= Kiryl Nguyen =

Belarusian blogger and civic activist

- Born: Kiryl Kuokavich Nguyen; 8 December 1993 (age 32); Minsk, Belarus
- Citizenship: Belarus
- Education: Moscow State University
- Occupations: Blogger, activist, founder of Gaga Daily
- Known for: Creating the world's largest Lady Gaga fan community
- Website: gagadaily.com

Kiryl Kuokavich Nguyen (Belarusian: Кірыл Куокавіч Нгуен; born 8 December 1993) is a Belarusian blogger, civic activist, and the founder of "Gaga Daily", the world's largest fan community dedicated to American singer Lady Gaga. He is a former Belarusian political prisoner who was incarcerated for his participation in the 2020–2021 Belarusian protests.

== Early life and education ==
Kiryl Nguyen was born on 8 December 1993 in Minsk, Belarus. His surname is of Vietnamese origin. He studied in Russia and graduated in 2019 with a master's degree from the Faculty of Foreign Languages and Regional Studies at Moscow State University.

== Gaga Daily ==
In 2009, Nguyen founded "Gaga Daily", an English-language fan project that eventually grew into the largest Lady Gaga fan community in the world. As of 2026, the project includes an official website with a forum, an X (Twitter) account with over 480,000 followers, an Instagram profile with 517,000 subscribers, and a Facebook page with 1.3 million followers.

Lady Gaga herself has officially recognized the resource as the primary platform for her fanbase. In a 2009 interview with Rolling Stone, she stated: "When I go to see what my fans are saying, I go on Gaga Daily." During Nguyen's political imprisonment from early 2024 to April 2026, which coincided with the release of the singer's seventh studio album MAYHEM and the accompanying tour, the accounts were managed by his friends Christian and Anthony.

== Activism and political imprisonment ==
Nguyen actively participated in the mass protests in Belarus against Alyaksandr Lukashenka's regime in 2020. During rallies in Minsk, he was photographed holding a sign with a Rihanna quote, "A rat is a rat", standing alongside protesters with white-red-white flags. The poster was a satirical response to an August 2020 incident where Alyaksandr Lukashenka, flying in a helicopter over Minsk armed with an assault rifle, referred to the dispersing protesters as "rats" (Russian: Как крысы разбежались, "Like rats they scattered"). The insult was quickly reclaimed by the opposition, becoming a popular meme and protest slogan directed back at Lukashenka.

Nguyen also publicly expressed support for IT entrepreneur Mikita Mikada and criticized commercial brands attempting to profit from protest symbols. On 1 March 2022, Nguyen was detained in Moscow during an anti-war rally following the Russian invasion of Ukraine, subsequently posting a photograph from inside a Russian police van with the Kremlin visible through the window.

In early 2024, Nguyen was detained in Belarus. On 10 May 2024, Judge Inna Sivets of the October District Court of Minsk sentenced him under Part 1 of Article 342 of the Criminal Code of Belarus ("Organization and preparation of actions that grossly violate public order") to one year and six months in a penal colony. Belarusian human rights organizations officially recognized him as a political prisoner. On 26 July 2024, the Ministry of Internal Affairs added him to the list of citizens involved in "extremist activities".

On 25 March 2025, a second trial took place under the same article for a different protest episode, increasing his total sentence to two years and six months. Nguyen served his sentence in Penal Colony No. 17 in Shklow. According to Nguyen, while completely isolated from global pop culture, he unexpectedly heard Lady Gaga's new song "Abracadabra" playing on the prison radio. He also mentioned attempting to watch the movie Joker: Folie à Deux, which stars Lady Gaga, but was forced to turn it off by his cellmate who was serving a 20-year sentence for murder.

Nguyen was fully released on 8 April 2026. Following his release, he left Belarus and relocated to the European Union.

== 2026 viral return ==
On 22 September 2026, after regaining control of the Gaga Daily accounts, Nguyen posted an update explaining his two-year absence, stating: "In early 2024, I was arrested in my home country for protesting against the government and sentenced to more than two years in prison."

Because Nguyen initially omitted his full name and the name of his country, Western fans and media outlets mistakenly assumed he was Russian and had served time in a Russian prison. This sparked a viral wave of memes claiming Lady Gaga's new music had become a hit in Russian penal colonies. The misconception was quickly debunked by Belarusian independent media, which confirmed his identity and political prisoner status by cross-referencing his age, internet aliases, and archival photographs.

Following the clarification, the leader of the Belarusian democratic movement, Sviatlana Tsikhanouskaya, reacted to the story on X, praising Nguyen's work and highlighting his status as a Belarusian political prisoner whose project was kept alive by friends despite the repressions.
