= Miro (collaboration platform) =

Visual collaboration website

RealtimeBoard, Inc.
- Trade name: Miro
- Formerly: RealtimeBoard
- Type: Private
- Industry: Software as a service
- Founded: 2011
- Founder: Andrey Khusid; Oleg Shardin
- Headquarters: Amsterdam, Netherlands San Francisco, California, United States
- Number of employees: 1,864
- Website: miro.com

Miro is a collaborative online platform designed to support teams in planning and execution across different locations and time zones. It is used for a variety of purposes, including brainstorming, agile planning, customer journey mapping, product design, and remote workshops. As of 2025, the platform is utilized by over 90 million users and more than 250,000 organizations worldwide.

== History ==
=== Founding and early years (2011–2020) ===
Miro was founded in 2011 under the name RealtimeBoard by Russian entrepreneurs Andrey Khusid and Oleg Shardin. Originally designed as a simple visual whiteboarding tool, the product attracted global remote teams because its real-time collaboration features differentiated it from traditional diagramming software.

In 2018, the company raised $25 million in Series A funding led by Accel, with participation from Altair Capital and Scale Venture Partners. By then, it had grown to over 2 million users.

In 2019, the company rebranded to Miro, inspired by the Catalan artist Joan Miró, to reflect its vision beyond whiteboarding into end-to-end visual collaboration.

=== Global expansion and investment (2021–2023) ===
In January 2022, Miro raised $400 million in Series C funding, co-led by ICONIQ Growth, Accel, Atlassian, Dragoneer, GIC, and Scale Venture Partners, reaching a valuation of $17.5 billion.

The company has expanded its global workforce and is jointly headquartered in Amsterdam and San Francisco. It has also established offices in Austin and Sydney.

The COVID-19 pandemic accelerated Miro's adoption, as teams sought cloud-native remote work alternatives to in-office whiteboards and meeting rooms.

=== Becoming an innovation workspace (2024–present) ===
In 2024, Miro started its transition from visual collaboration platform to innovation workspace. The company aims to tackle common organizational challenges that impede innovation, such as fragmented workflows and communication breakdowns.

In September 2026, the Italian software company Bending Spoons agreed to acquire Miro.

== CEO and leadership ==
Andrey Khusid, co-founder and CEO, is an advocate of product-led growth and distributed work models.

Jeff Chow, chief product and technology officer since 2022, previously worked at Google and Tripadvisor, and leads Miro's AI and platform innovation.

== Acquisitions ==
In October 2022, Miro acquired video conferencing startup Around to enhance synchronous collaboration directly within the Miro canvas.

In June 2024, Miro acquired Danish AI design startup Uizard, strengthening its generative interface and rapid prototyping capabilities.

In 2026, Miro acquired Edtech company, Reforge.

== Events ==
=== Distributed and Canvas ===
From 2017 to 2023, Miro hosted an annual virtual conference called Distributed focused on remote collaboration and product updates. In 2024, the event was rebranded as Canvas and held in a hybrid format. At Canvas 2024, Miro introduced the Innovation Workspace, which SD Times described as "the company's most significant platform update since its founding."

== See also ==
- List of collaborative software
- Visual thinking
- Whiteboarding
