= PandaDoc =

American software company

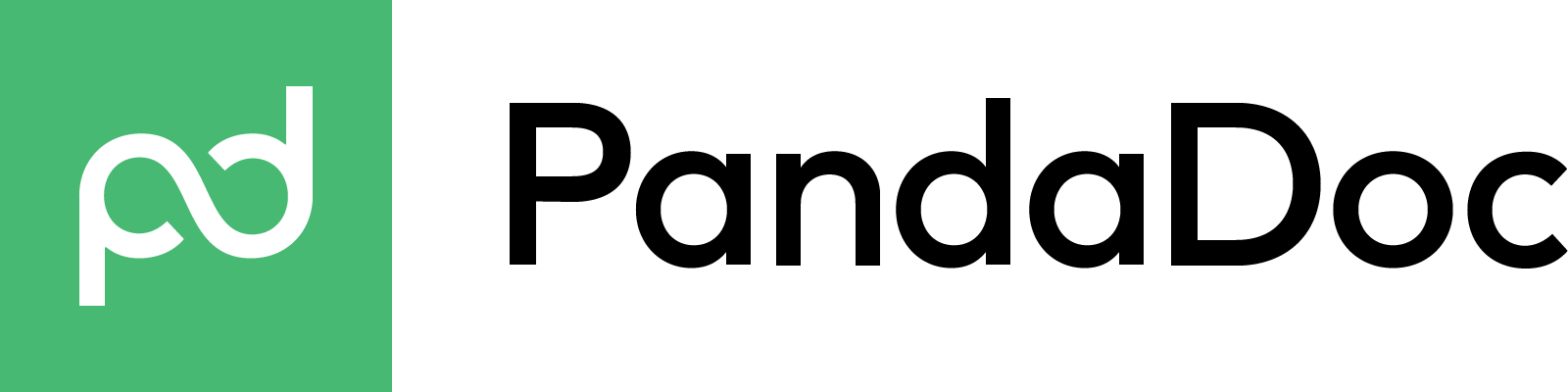
- Website type: Private
- Founded: 2013; 13 years ago
- Headquarters: San Francisco, California
- No. of locations: 4
- Owners: PandaDoc, Inc.
- Founders: Mikita Mikado, CEO; Sergey Barysiuk, CTO
- Industry: SaaS
- Revenue: ▲$100 million
- Employees: 700
- Website: www.pandadoc.com

PandaDoc is an American software company that provides SaaS software. The platform provides sales processes software. PandaDoc is based in San Francisco, California with main offices in St. Petersburg, Florida. PandaDoc is document automation software as a service with built-in electronic signatures, workflow management, a document builder, and CPQ functionality. Some Belarusian-born employees of the company were persecuted in Belarus for participating in 2020 Belarusian protests.

== History ==
In 2011, the company was founded by Mikita Mikado and Sergey Barysiuk in Minsk, Belarus. In 2014, company headquarters were moved to Silicon Valley. Mikado and Barysiuk initially created Quote Roller in 2011. In 2017, the company opened an office in St. Petersburg, Florida.

In 2015 company raised $5M in Series A, led by Altos Ventures. PandaDoc closed two Series B fundings, B1 in May 2017 with $15M, and B2 in August 2018 worth $30 million led by One Peak Partners. In September 2021, PandaDoc closed a Series C with a $1 billion valuation, thus becoming the first Belarus-originated unicorn.

== Software ==
PandaDoc proposal and contract software is a SaaS product for sales processes.

=== Features ===
PandaDoc includes features to create, track and execute documents, as well as functionality for electronic signatures. It consists of features in the following categories: proposals, quotes, team management, content management, branding, tracking, workflow, productivity, etc. It integrates with several CRMs, as well as ERP, payment, cloud storage, and other systems.

== Political activity ==
During 2020–21 Belarusian protests that followed rigged elections, PandaDoc founders offered financial aid and professional retraining (in the tech industry) to the police officers who had lost their jobs because of refusing to illegally suppress protesters. In retaliation, on September 2, 2020, the Minsk office was raided by the authorities, more than a hundred employees were questioned, 7 were detained. A criminal case was opened against four of them. Three of the arrested were conditionally released later that autumn; the last remaining person under arrest, product manager Victor Kuvshinov, was released in August 2021. He spent more than 1 year in prison. On 31 August 2021, the authorities of Belarus announced that the case against PandaDoc was closed after the defendants admitted their guilt and compensated the alleged damage.

In 2021-22, the company’s office in Minsk was liquidated, the staff was relocated to Portugal, Poland, the Philippines, and Kyiv.

== Recognition and awards ==
- 2017 — Hot Vendor in Modern Content Management in 2017 by Aragon Research
- 2020 — Best Overall SaaS Award Winner by APPEALIE

== See also ==
- Sales quote
