= Mikita Mikado =

Belarusian businessperson

- Микита Микадо
- Born: 1986 (age 39–40); Minsk, Belarus
- Education: Belarusian State University of Informatics and Radioelectronics
- Occupation: IT entrepreneur
- Years active: 2011 — present
- Known for: Co-founder of PandaDoc

Mikita Mikado is a Belarusian IT entrepreneur who was the co-founder of the PandaDoc company. He has been based in the United States since 2013.

== Early years and education ==
Mikado was born in Minsk in 1979, he studied at the Belarusian State University of Informatics and Radioelectronics in 2001–2006.

== Career ==
At the age of 19, Mikado went to the United States on a Work and Travel programme. Along with half-time jobs, he tried himself in web-design and software development.

In 2011, Mikado returned to Belarus. Together with his partner Sergey Barysiuk, he created Quote Roller, a tool that automated sending and tracking of commercial offers. By 2013, the start-up had grown into PandaDoc, an e-document platform that lets its customers create, share, and sign official documents online. PandaDoc was growing quickly and soon had more than 3000 clients.

In 2013, Mikado returned to San Francisco and managed to raise $5 million in investment from prominent investors such as Kima Ventures, Altair Capital, and Fabrice Grinda. As of 2015, 16 employees worked in the Minsk office and 14 worked in San Francisco.

In 2017, PandaDoc attracted $15m in investment from Rembrandt Ventures Partners, as well as Microsoft Ventures, HubSpot, EBRD and Altos Ventures.

In 2021, PandaDoc raised a new financing round at a $1 billion valuation.

== Recognition ==
In 2020, Mikado starred in Yury Dud's documentary on Russian-speaking startupers of Silicon Valley. Along with other heroes of the film, Mikado ‘woke up famous’ after the release. The role made him famous among young Russians and turned him into a role model to those who dreamt of a career in IT.

== Social activity ==
Immediately after the violent crackdown on the Belarusian protests of 9–13 August 2020, Mikado joined the ‘Protect Belarus’ initiative and offered legal, educational and financial assistance to those former policemen who left their jobs in protest. Dozens of them successfully moved to work in the IT sector. The authorities responded with a strike against Mikado's company: four employees of the Minsk office were jailed in trumped-up cases. Three of them were released in several months, while product manager Victor Kuvshinov had spent more than 1 year in prison.

In 2022, Mikado invested into ‘Mesto’ start-up, a platform that helps IT workers, entrepreneurs, digital creators and companies relocate to Cyprus and Bali. ‘Mesto’ founded communities of those who have already relocated and offered them legal assistance, insurance, co-living accommodation, and helped with visas and bank accounts.
