= First Principles of Instruction =

Instructional theory created by M. David Merrill

First Principles of Instruction, created by M. David Merrill, Professor Emeritus at Utah State University, is an instructional theory based on a broad review of many instructional models and theories. First Principles of Instruction are created with the goal of establishing a set of principles upon which all instructional theories and models are in general agreement, and several authors acknowledge the fundamental nature of these principles. These principles can be used to assist teachers, trainers and instructional designers in developing research-based instructional materials in a manner that is likely to produce positive student learning gains.

== The Principles ==
First Principles of Instruction are described as a set of interrelated principles which, when properly applied in an instructional product or setting, will increase student learning. These principles include the following:

- Task/Problem-Centered – Students learn more when the instruction is centered on relevant real-world tasks or problems, including a series of tasks or problems that progress from simple to complex.
- Activation – Students learn more when they are directed to recall prior knowledge, to recall a structure for organizing that knowledge, or are given a structure for organizing new knowledge. This activation can also include a foundational learning experience upon which new learning can be based.
- Demonstration – Students learn more when new knowledge is demonstrated to them in the context of real-world tasks or problems. The knowledge that is demonstrated is both informational and skill-based. Demonstration is enhanced when it adheres to research-based principles of e-learning.
- Application – Students learn more when they perform real-world tasks or solve real-world problems and receive feedback and appropriate guidance during that application.
- Integration – Students learn more when they are encouraged to integrate their new knowledge into their life through reflection, discussion, debate, and/or presentation of new knowledge.

These principles can be used in a Task or Problem-Centered cycle of instruction beginning with Activation and continuing through Demonstration, Application, and Integration.

First Principles of Instruction is similar to other task-centered instructional theories (e.g. Van Merriënboer's Four Component Instructional Design Model) in that it uses a real-world problem or task as a vehicle for instruction. Students view demonstrations of real-world problem solving examples, are given opportunities to solve real-world problems and are given feedback on their application. Students are taught new knowledge and information within the context of the real-world task or problem, which provides a context in which the knowledge is obtained. First Principles is different than problem-based-learning, however, in that it provides more guidance and demonstration to students which is reduced as students gain expertise.

== Research support ==
There is a growing body of research support for Merrill's First Principles of Instruction. In one study, researchers surveyed 140 students at 89 different higher education institutions and discovered that students were 9 times more likely to report that they had mastered learning the course objectives when First Principles of Instruction were used and when they spent ample time and effort studying. Another study observed award-winning instructors at an institute of higher education and found that they used some or all of First Principles of Instruction in their teaching strategies, thereby linking acclaimed instructors with the principles. In another study, researchers compared the effectiveness of instruction using First Principles of Instruction with more traditional instruction and found that students in the First Principles group learned significantly more and finished learning tasks significantly faster. Another study found that biology students learning from instruction using First Principles of Instruction had significantly increased confidence in their ability to solve similar problems in the future, compared to other learners.

== See also ==
- Educational technology
- Instructional design
- Instructional theory
