= OpenWeb =

Israeli company

- Company type: Private
- Website type: Privately held company
- Available in: Multilingual
- Founded: 2015; 11 years ago
- Headquarters: New York City, United States
- Area served: Worldwide
- Founders: Nadav Shoval; Roee Goldberg; Ishay Green
- Key people: Tim Harvey (CEO); Haim Sasson (President); Tiffany Xingyu Wang (CMO); Max Weiss (COO); Yaron Blachman (CISO); Rob Meadows (CTO)
- Industry: Internet
- Employees: 400
- Website: openweb.com
- Launched: 2015; 11 years ago
- Current status: Active

OpenWeb is a social engagement platform that builds online communities around digital content. OpenWeb works with publishers to bring conversations back from social networks to publisher sites.

OpenWeb's technology allows publishers and online content creators to host and moderate comments sections, Polls, "Ask Me Anything"s and Live Blogs. Their products also include a module that allows users to track topics, an insights dashboard, and several advertising modules.

== History ==
The company was founded in 2015 as Spot.IM by Israeli software architects Nadav Shoval and Ishay Green. Roee Goldberg joined as Co-Founder and COO in 2014.

In 2016, Spot.IM raised $13 million from Index Ventures and AltaIR Capital, along with other notable technology investors, in a Series A round.

In 2017, co-founder and CEO, Nadav Shoval, was inducted into the second annual Forbes Israel 30 Under 30 list. In addition, the company finalized its Series C investment round of $25M, led by New York City-based fund - Insight Partners, Altair VC, and more.

In 2019, Spot.IM raised $25 million in Series D funding. The new funding was led by previous investor Insight Partners along with Norma Investments, AltaIR Capital, Cerca and WGI Group.

In 2020, the company was renamed OpenWeb.

In November 2021, OpenWeb raised a $150M Series E financing round which included investment from Insight Partners, Georgian, The New York Times Company, Samsung Next, Dentsu Ventures, Harel, Entrée Capital, Omer Cygler, and Scott Galloway. This round of investment pushed the company's valuation over $1 billion. In November 2022, OpenWeb announced a Series F round of funding at $170M, valuing the company at over $1.5 billion.

In February 2022, the company acquired Hive Media Group for a mix of cash and stock, with a total value of $60M. In April 2022, OpenWeb acquired French advertising company Adyoulike for a mix of cash and stock, with a total value of $100M. In January 2023, OpenWeb acquired personalization and monetization platform Jeeng.

The company has also been criticized for providing advertising services to Steve Bannon's far-right publication The Populist Press (now Political Signal), as well as Russian state media outlet RT. It cut ties with RT in 2023.

In September 2024 Nadav Shoval was replaced by Tim Harvey as CEO, purportedly after a disagreement over a potential investment from BlackRock. Nadav Shoval refused to step down as CEO, but he was removed from OpenWeb's leadership page. Shoval attempted to be reinstated as CEO by filing an injunction with an Israeli court, however he was unsuccessful.

In February 2025, Nadav Shoval was allowed to return to OpenWeb as an advisor to the CEO.

In June 2026 Microsoft corporation (MSFT) terminated its engagement with OpenWeb, citing use of "invalid Traffic." Consequently, also due to its increasing inability to meet payment obligations, OpenWeb filed a request for insolvency protection in September 2026.

== See also ==
- Internet forum
- List of social networking websites
- Online community
- Social networking service
- Website monetization
