= F. J. Christopher =

British journalist, writer and broadcaster (1912–1960)

Frederick John Christopher (1912–1960) was an English author, journalist, magazine editor and broadcaster, working within the field of DIY journalism. Together with his second wife, Rosemary Brinley Christopher, he wrote over twenty titles for W&G Foyle limited. He also wrote under the pseudonym of Edward Kitson. His works include Basketry, (1950), Hand-Loom Weaving, Home Decorating, Lampshade Making, Leatherwork, Upholstering (1950). Alongside his authored works he was also the editor of Popular Handicrafts Magazine.

His works generally consisted of information on a wide range of subjects collectively termed "do-it-yourself"
