= M. David Merrill =

American education researcher specializing in instructional design and technology

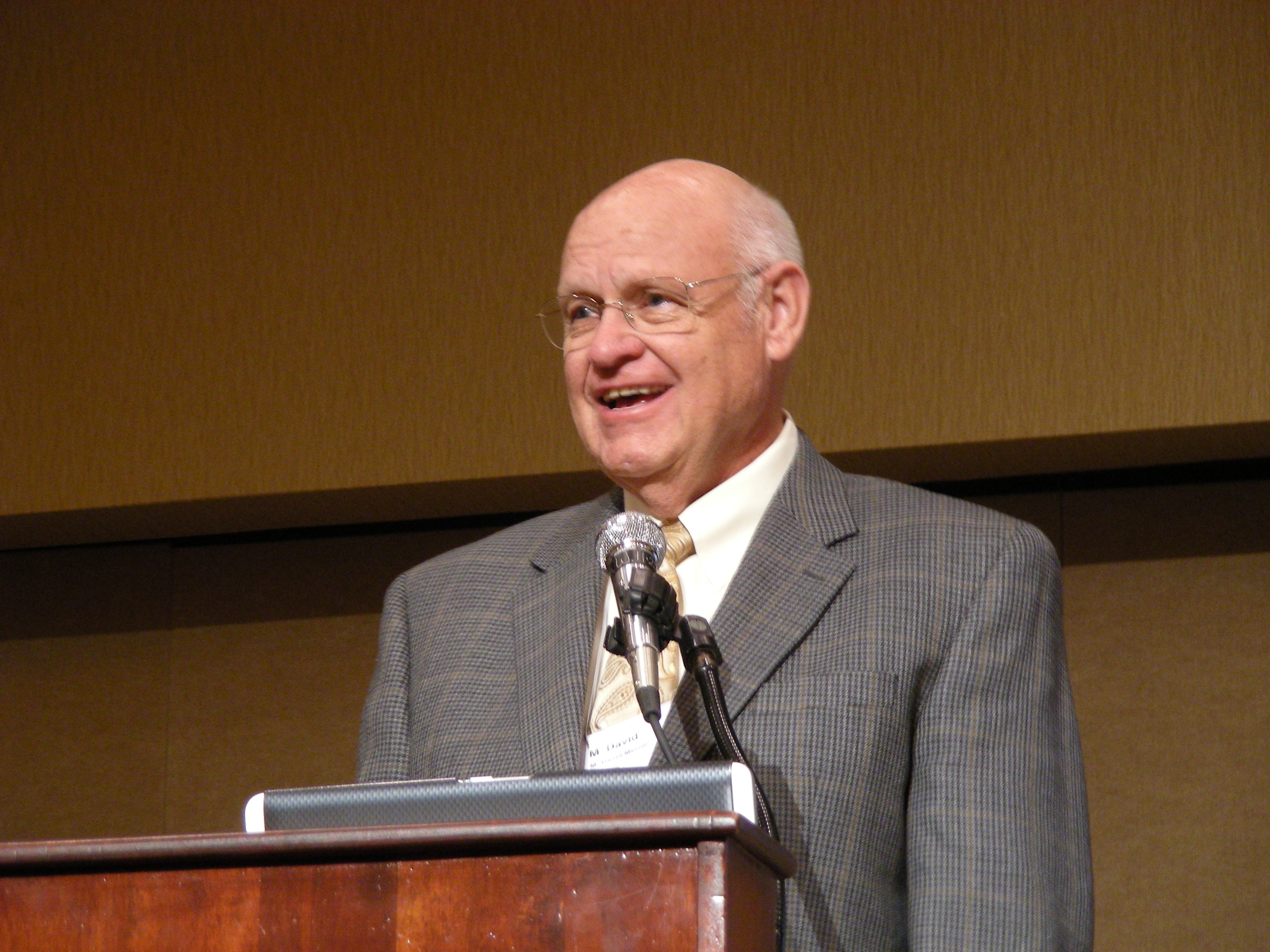
M. David Merrill in 2009

M. David Merrill (Marriner David Merrill) is an American education researcher specializing in instructional design and technology.

== Personal life ==
Merrill was born on March 27, 1937. After completing high school, he was involved in missionary work for the Church of Jesus Christ of Latter-day Saints in Ohio, Indiana and Michigan. He is married to Kathleen Merrill and together they have nine children and 39 grandchildren. He currently lives in Utah.

== Education and career ==
In 1961, Merrill earned a Bachelor of Arts in secondary education from Brigham Young University. He earned an MA and a Ph.D. from the University of Illinois in 1964.

Merrill has been a faculty member at numerous universities during his extensive academic career:

- George Peabody College for Teachers (Vanderbilt University) from 1964 to 1966
- Brigham Young University from 1967 to 1967 and 1968 to 1979. Also in the early 1970s Merrill was a member of the Select Committee on the future of Higher Education in the Church of Jesus Christ of Latter-day Saints chaired by Henry B. Eyring.
- University of Southern California from 1979 to 1988
- Utah State University from 1987 to 2004, where he is now an emeritus professor.
- Brigham Young University from 2004 to 2009
- Florida State University from 2007 to 2009.

== Research ==
Merrill's research has helped lead to the development of three important theories that underpin the discipline of Instructional Design and Technology today: The Component Display Theory, Instructional Transaction Theory and the First Principles of Instruction.

=== Component Display Theory ===
The Component Display Theory (CDT) classifies learning into two dimensions: content and performance. Merrill developed a performance/content matrix which can be used to ascertain the levels of performance that is required for an area of content. The dimension of content consist of four areas: facts, procedures, concepts and principles; while the performance dimension consists of remembering, using and finding. The component display theory can be used to design instruction for any level of the cognitive domain and it provides a basis for lesson design in computer-based learning systems. In 1994, Merrill revised the original component display theory and the focus shifted towards a more macro perspective. The emphasis shifted from lesson towards general course structure and from forms to instructional transactions.

=== First Principles of Instruction ===
The First Principles of Instruction is an instructional theory that takes into consideration many instructional theories and models. It includes as set of inter-related principles – task/problem-centered, activation, demonstration, application and integration. These principles can help instructional designers develop instructional materials that can enhance the instructional and learning process. It is a task-centered instructional theory and as such emphasis is placed on the use of real-world problems or tasks in the instructional process.

- In task/problem-centered: learners learn when the instruction is centered on real-world problems or tasks and this progresses from simple to complex.
- In activation: learners learn when they are required to recall previous knowledge, recall a structure for organizing that knowledge or are given a structure for organizing new knowledge.
- Demonstration: learners learn new skills and knowledge when such skills or knowledge is demonstrated to them in a context of a real-world problem or task.
- Application: learners learn when they actually perform a real-world task.
- Integration: learners learn when they integrate new knowledge into their everyday life.

=== Instructional Transactional Theory ===
This theory was developed by Merrill along with Li and Jones and it was regarded as a second generation Instructional Design Theory. This theory was designed in an attempt to extend Gagne's condition of learning and Merrill's component display theory to form a design which had the capacity for automated instruction. Hence, it can be described as computer-based instructional design. Instructional transactions are algorithms, patterns of learning interactions which have been designed to enable the learner to acquire certain kind of knowledge or skills. The instructional transactional theory has three components- Descriptive theory of knowledge, Descriptive theory of strategy and Prescriptive theory of instructional design.

== Publications ==
M. D. Merrill has published many books, edited many chapters in books, written numerous Journal articles etc. Below is a list of some of his publications

- Mendenhall, A., Buhanan, C.W., Suhaka, M., Mills, G., Gibson, G.V., & Merrill, M.D. (2006). "A taskcentered approach to entrepreneurship." TechTrends 50(4): 84–89.
- Merrill, M. D. (2001). "Toward a theoretical tool for instructional design." Instructional Science, 29(4- 5), 291–310.
- Merrill, M. D. (2002). "A pebble-in-the-pond model for instructional design." Performance Improvement, 41(7), 39–44.
- Merrill, M. D. (2002). "First principles of instruction." Educational Technology Research and Development, 50(3), 43–59.
- Merrill, M. D. (2006). "Levels of instructional strategy." Educational Technology 46(4): 5–10.
- Merrill, M. D. (2006). Hypothesized performance on complex tasks as a function of scaled instructional strategies. Handling Complexity in Learning Environments: Theory and Research. J. Enen and R. E. Clark. Amsterdam, Elsevier: 265–281.
- Merrill, M. D. (2007). "A task-centered instructional strategy." Journal of Research on Technology in Education, 40(1), 33–50
- Merrill, M. D. (2007). "First principles of instruction: a synthesis." In Reiser, R.A. and Dempsey, J.V. (Eds) Trends and Issues in Instructional Design and Technology, 2nd Edition. Upper Saddle River, NJ, Merrill/Prentice Hall. 2: 62–71.
- Merrill, M. David (2008). "Converting e_{3} learning to e^{3} learning: an alternative instructional design method". In S. Carliner & P. Shank (Eds.), The E-Learning Handbook: Past Promises, Present Challenges (pp. 359–400). San Francisco: Pfeiffer.
- Merrill, M. D. (2008). "Reflections on a four-decade search for effective, efficient and engaging instruction." In M. W. Allen (Ed.), Michael Allen’s e-Learning Annual Volume 1 (2008) (pp. 141– 167). San Francisco: Wiley/Pfieffer
- Merrill, M. D. (2008). "Why basic principles of instruction must be present in the learning landscape, whatever form it takes, for learning to be effective, efficient and engaging." In J. Visser & M. VisserValfrey (Eds.), Learners in a Changing Learning Landscape: Reflections from a Dialogue on New Roles and Expectations (pp. 267–275): Springer.
- Merrill, M. D. (2009). "Finding e3 (effective, efficient and engaging) Instruction." Educational Technology, 49(3), 15–26.
- Merrill, M. D. (2009). "First Principles of Instruction." In C. M. Reigeluth & A. Carr-Chellman (Eds.), Instructional Design Theories and Models III. Mahwah: Lawrence Erlbaum Associates Inc.
- Merrill, M. D., & Gilbert, C. G. (2008). "Effective peer interaction in a problem-centered instructional strategy." Distance Education, 29(2), 199–207.
- Merrill, M. D., Barclay, M., & Van Schaack, A. (2008). "Prescriptive principles for instructional design." In J. M. Spector, M. D. Merrill, J. J. G. van Merrienboer & M. P. Driscol (Eds.), Handbook of Research on Educational Communications and Technology (3rd ed., pp. 173–184). New York: Lawrence Erlbaum Associates: Taylor and Francis Group.
