= Toolbelt Diva =

Toolbelt Diva was a do-it-yourself television program on Discovery Home in the U.S. from 2004 to 2008. Hosted by Norma Vally, this half-hour show encouraged and empowered women to take on home improvement projects themselves.

== Episodes ==
Season	Episodes	Originally released	
Season	Episodes	First released	Last released
1	12	August 6, 2004	January 14, 2005
2	10	June 3, 2005	August 5, 2005
3	10	February 10, 2006	April 14, 2006
4	10	February 9, 2007	April 27, 2007
