= L. Inc. =

This is L. Inc.
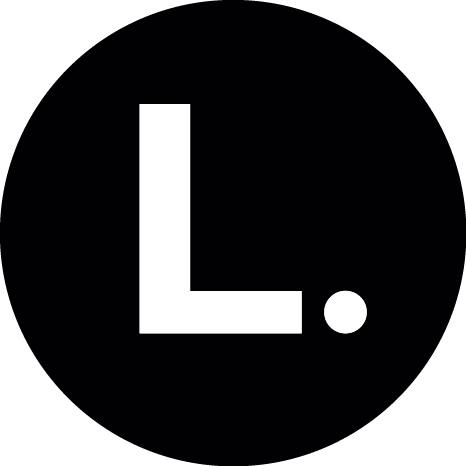
- Industry: Personal care products
- Founded: 2015
- Founder: Talia Frenkel
- Headquarters: San Francisco, California, U.S.
- Area served: United States
- Website: www.thisisl.com

This is L. Inc. (L.) is a privately held, California based social enterprise and public-benefit corporation that makes organic personal care products. The company has a one-for-one give back model: for every product sold, one is made accessible to a person who needs it. L. has supported a network of over 4,000 female entrepreneurs around the world and is on track to give over 200 million health products. L. is the fastest growing feminine care company in the United States according to the market research group IRI. On February 5, 2019, it was announced that P&G acquired This is L.

== History ==
L. was founded by Talia Frenkel, a photojournalist, who worked for organizations such as the United Nations and Red Cross. Frenkel’s coverage of women's lack of access to reproductive rights and the effects of HIV/AIDS on young girls drove her to provide a sustainable solution to improving access to prevention. L. works with female entrepreneurs that distribute donated health products in Kenya, Uganda, Sierra Leone, Eswatini, Rwanda, Tanzania, Democratic Republic of Congo, South Africa, Ethiopia, Madagascar, Ghana, Guatemala, Malawi, Zambia, Zimbabwe, Dominican Republic, Haiti, Ecuador, Nepal, Cambodia, India, Papua New Guinea, and Lebanon.

L. is funded by Y Combinator.

L. has received coverage from press outlets including The Financial Times, Forbes, The New York Times, Fast Company, Vanity Fair, Cosmopolitan, and Glamour. L. has partnered with Planned Parenthood, Women’s Health, Revlon, and Refinery 29.

== Products ==
L.’s feminine care line includes organic cotton tampons, menstrual pads, liners, and wipes. L.’s feminine care products are made with GOTS-certified organic cotton and are free of chlorine, pesticides, fragrances and dyes.

L. condoms were made with low-protein latex. The latex was sourced local to the manufacturing facility and the packaging was made with 100% recyclable materials and vegetable-based inks. The condom packaging was intentionally gender-neutral. Mid-2019, the company ceased production of prophylactics and began solely focusing on menstrual care products.
