= National Instructional Materials Accessibility Standard =

The National Instructional Materials Accessibility Standard (NIMAS) helps facilitate timely access to alternate formats of instructional materials for students with visual impairments or other print disabilities. NIMAS (pronounced NYE-mas) outlines a set of consistent and valid XML-based source files created by K–12 curriculum publishers or other content producers. These well-structured source files can be used to create accessible specialized formats (i.e., braille, audio, e-text, large print, etc.) of print instructional materials. The full set of files includes XML content files, a package file, images, and a PDF file of the title page (or whichever page contains ISBN and copyright information).

In a significant step forward for students with disabilities, the U.S. Congress adopted NIMAS as part of the Individuals with Disabilities Education Improvement Act of 2004, a reauthorization of the Individuals with Disabilities Education Act.
