= Instructional materials =

Materials used to impart knowledge

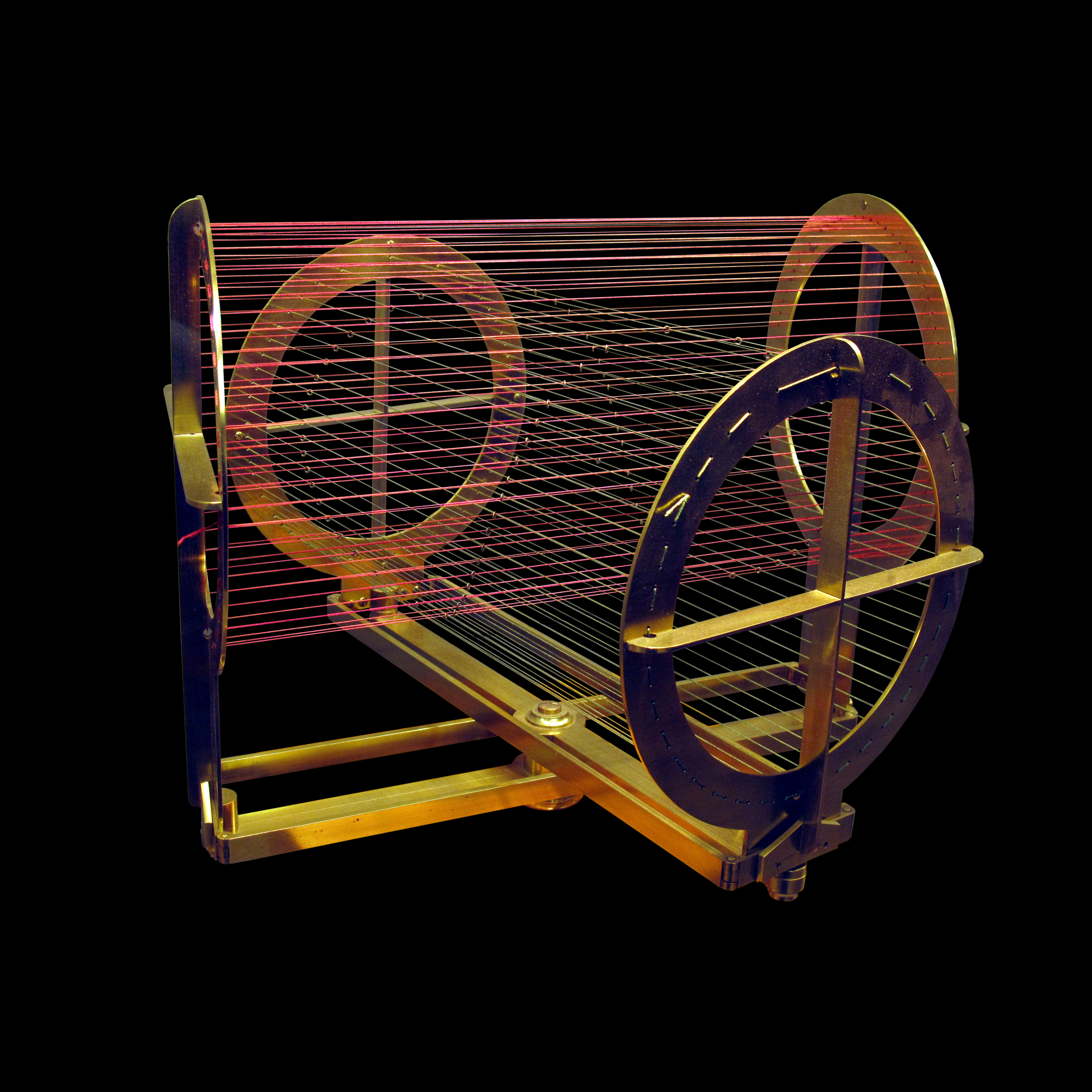
3D model used for teaching geometry

Instructional materials, also known as teaching materials, learning materials, or teaching/learning materials (TLM), are any collection of materials including animate and inanimate objects and human and non-human resources that a teacher may use in teaching and learning situations to help achieve desired learning objectives. Instructional materials may aid a student in concretizing a learning experience so as to make learning more exciting, interesting and interactive. They are tools used in instructional activities, which include active learning and assessment. The term encompasses all the materials and physical means an instructor might use to implement instruction and facilitate students achievement of instructional objectives.

== Background ==
The value of instructional materials as a pedagogical aid can be seen in Vachel Lindsay's poem "Euclid":

Old Euclid drew a circle
On a sand-beach, long ago.
He bounded and enclosed it
With angles thus and so.

His set of solemn greybeards
Nodded and argued much
Of arc and of circumference
Diameter and such.

A silent child stood by them
From morning until noon,
Because they drew such charming
Round pictures of the moon.

== Types of instructional materials ==
Instructional materials can be classified by type, including print, visual, and audiovisual, among others:

Print	Textbooks, pamphlets, handouts, study guides, manuals, blackboard and whiteboard
Audio	Cassettes, microphones, podcasts, CDs
Visual	Charts, real objects, photographs, transparencies
Audiovisual	Slides, tapes, films, filmstrips, television, video, multimedia, DVDs
Electronic interactive	Computers, graphing calculators, tablets

== Evaluation of instructional materials ==
=== Peer-Reviewed Instructional Materials Online (PRIMO) Committee ===
The Peer-Reviewed Instructional Materials Online (PRIMO) Committee "'promotes and shares peer-reviewed instructional materials created by librarians to teach people about discovering, accessing and evaluating information in networked environments.' In doing so, it reviews librarian-created online tutorials dealing with information literacy and critical thinking skills, and highlights the highest-caliber projects through its "Site of the Month" posts on the ACRL Instruction Section blog. PRIMO's goal is to provide librarians quality tutorials for instructional use on a variety of topics in order to save time, effort and cost. PRIMO accepts non-promotional online instructional material intended for undergraduate or graduate-level audiences emphasizing quality over comprehensiveness.

=== Instructional Materials Evaluation Tool ===
"Student Achievement Partners is a nonprofit organization that assembles educators and researchers to design actions based on evidence that will substantially improve student achievement." The tool provided by the organization is the Textbook Alignment and Adaptations Instructional Materials Evaluation Tool. The goal of this tool is to assist in evaluation textbooks or series of textbooks for alignment to the Common Core State Standards Initiative.

== See also ==
- First Principles of Instruction
- Cognitive load
- Instructional design
- Learning object
- National Instructional Materials Accessibility Standard
- Open educational resources
- DoITPoMS
