= Nadav Shoval =

Israeli-American entrepreneur (born 1990)

- נדב שובל
- Born: 1990 (age 35–36); Israel
- Occupations: entrepreneur, investor
- Known for: founder of OpenWeb; founder of FlowMode; co-founder of Project Omega

Nadav Shoval (Hebrew: נדב שובל; born 1990) is an Israeli-American entrepreneur, investor, and technology executive. He is the founder of OpenWeb and FlowMode, and a co-founder of Project Omega. Shoval is chief executive officer of FlowMode, a board member of Project Omega, and a senior advisor to OpenWeb. In 2012, he founded OpenWeb, a U.S.-based software company that works with online publishers and advertisers. He was its CEO from 2015 to 2024. In 2017, he was included in Forbes Israel's "30 Under 30" list.

== Early life and education ==
Nadav Shoval was born in 1990. During childhood, he was diagnosed with Kawasaki disease, a condition that limited his physical activity for a period of time. During his recovery, he developed an interest in computers and began participating in online communities. He built chat platforms and forums, and contributed to classroom computer projects.

== Career ==
In July 2005, Nadav Shoval founded Looop Ltd., a company focused on online marketing and sales. In May 2010, he launched Simple One, an app designed to organize social media platforms and SMS communications, where he was CEO.

In 2015, Shoval co-founded Spot.IM, later renamed OpenWeb, a U.S.-based software company. The company develops tools for online publishers and advertisers, including moderation software and community engagement platforms. According to interviews, Shoval described the company's mission as creating safer online communities through social media tools.

As CEO, he oversaw the company's expansion into AI- and ML-driven moderation technologies, as well as its growth in data and advertising sectors.

In 2024, Shoval stepped down as chief executive officer of OpenWeb following a settlement with the company's board of directors. He subsequently assumed the role of senior advisor to the company.

=== Project Omega ===
In early 2025, Shoval co-founded Project Omega, a technology venture alongside Stafford Sheehan. Project Omega builds technologies that turn nuclear waste into renewable energy. In 2026, the business emerged from stealth raising $12 million from venture capitalists including Starship Ventures, Mantis Ventures, Buckley Ventures, Slow Ventures, and Decisive Point. Shoval is a co-founder and member of the board of directors.

=== Investments ===
Beyond his operational roles, Shoval is an angel investor and startup advisor. He has invested in numerous early-stage technology companies, including Jedify, Terra One, Synonym, Cased, and TitleDock.

== Personal life ==
As of 2023, Shoval lives in Brooklyn, New York City. He is married and has one child.
