= Shraga Shoval =

Israeli professor (born 1958)

- שרגא שובל
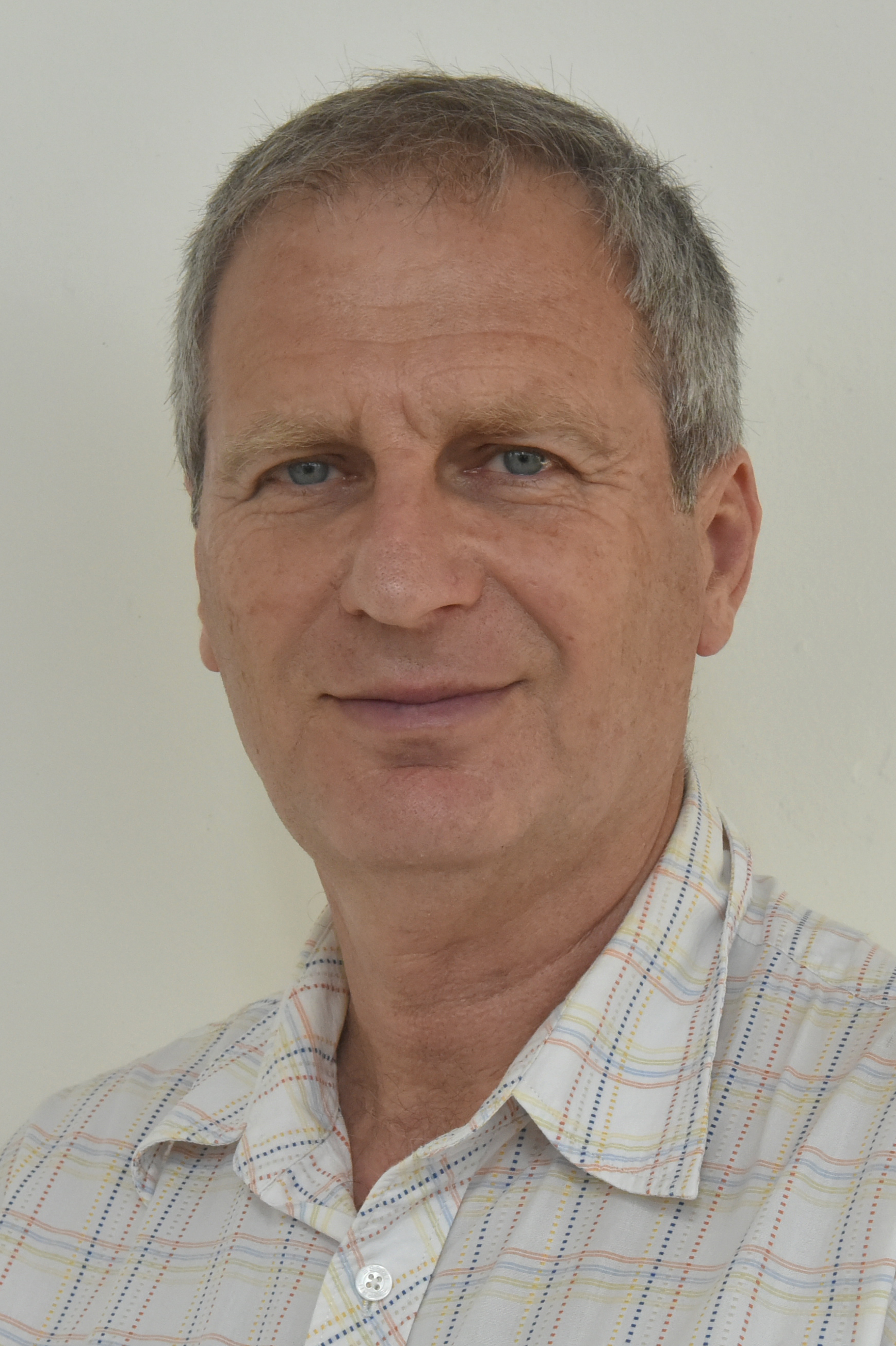
- Born: 19 October 1958 (age 68)
- Education: Technion, University of Michigan
- Scientific career
- Fields: Robotics; Industrial Engineering; Systems Engineering
- Workplaces: Ariel University
- Thesis: Information Transfer in a Robotic Based Travel Aid for the Blind (1994)

Shraga Shoval (Hebrew: שרגא שובל; born: 19 October 1958) is an Israeli professor in the Department of Industrial Engineering & Management and the Dean of the Engineering Faculty at Ariel University

== Early life and education ==
Shraga Shoval was born in Ramat-Gan, Israel. He studied at Ohel Shem high school and received his B.Sc. (1985) and M.sc. (1987) in Mechanical Engineering from the Technion, Israel Institute of Technology. Title of his M.Sc. thesis: Integration of a CNC Lathe and a Robot in a Flexible Manufacturing Cell. Advisor: Prof. Ehud Lenz. Between 1987-1990 Shraga worked as a scientist in the Commonwealth Scientific and Industrial Research Organization (CSIRO) – Division of Manufacturing Technologies in Sydney, Australia, developing a robotic system for the processing of colored gemstones.

He completed his Ph.D. in the University of Michigan, Ann Arbor, at the department of Mechanical Engineering and Applied Mechanics in 1994. Title of his Ph.D. thesis: Integration of Intelligent Agents in an Adaptive Travel Aiding System for the Blind. Advisors: Prof. Yoram Koren and Prof. Johann Borenstein.

The NavBelt, a navigation device for the blind and visually impaired using mobile robotics technology, that was developed based on this thesis, is one of the first robotic aids for the blind. The Navbelt lead to the development of the GuideCane, that was awarded the best robotics invention by Discover Magazine in 1998.

== Work ==
Shraga Shoval returned to Israel in 1994 after completing his Ph.D. for post-doctorate in the Faculty of Mechanical Engineering at the Technion, and until 2000 he was a research fellow and head of the Robotics and Computer-aided Manufacturing Laboratory at the Faculty of Industrial Engineering & Management at the Technion. Between 1996-1997 he worked as a consultant for Chrysler Corporation in the development of one of the first unmanned passenger vehicles for their Automatic Durability Road test (ADR) facility at the Chrysler Proving Ground in Chelsea, Michigan.

In 1998 he joined the Department of Industrial Engineering & Management at Ariel University (then the College of Judea and Samaria), first as an adjunct lecturer, and in 2000 as a senior lecturer. In 2001 he designed and established the first robotics laboratory at Ariel University. In this framework he initiated the first research activity in Israel that utilized robotics technology as a counter-terrorism response in tunnel environments. Shraga served as the department chair of Industrial Engineering and Management between 2000-2007, and 2009-2015. He became an associate professor in 2005 and on his sabbatical (2007-2008) he worked at the Defence and Systems Institute (DASI) at the University of South Australia. From 2015 to 2016 he was on sabbatical in Australia at the University of New South Wales, and when he returned in 2016, he was elected as Dean of the Engineering Faculty at Ariel University. In 2018 he was promoted to a Full Professor at Ariel University.

== Research activities ==
- Autonomous mobile systems
- Computer integrated manufacturing
- Systems Engineering

== Publications ==
Prof. Shoval has authored more than 200 scientific publications, including a textbook, "Computer Integrated Manufacturing" (in Hebrew), that was published by the Open University of Israel (2012).

Shoval has also registered a patent for "Dual tracked mobile robot for motion in rough terrain".

== Selected articles ==
- Shoval S., Borenstein J., Koren Y.: "The Navbelt - A Computerized Travel Aid for the Blind based on Mobile Robotics Technology", IEEE Transactions on Biomedical Engineering, Vol. 45, No. 11, November 1998, pp. 1376–1386.
- Rimon E., Shoval S., Shapiro A., "Design of a Spider Robot for Motion with Quasistatic Force Constraints", Journal of Autonomous Robots, 10, 2001, pp. 279–296.
- Shoval S., Sinriech D., "Analysis of LandMark Configuration for Absolute Positioning of Autonomous Vehicles", The Journal of Manufacturing systems, 20(1) 2001, pp. 44–54.
- Shoval S., Ulrich I., Borenstein J., "Computerized Obstacle Avoidance for the Blind and Visually Impaired", IEEE Journal of Robotics and Automation, March 2003 special issue on Robots in the Service of the Disabled. Vol. 9 No. 1, pp. 9–20.
- Shraga Shoval and Amir Shapiro, "Dual Tracked Mobile Robot for Motion in Challenging Terrains", Journal of Field Robotics 28(5):769-791 Sep 2011.
- Capua A, Shapiro A, Shoval S, "SpiderBot: a cable-suspended walking robot", Mechanism and Machine Theory 82:56-70, Dec 2014.
- Waizman G, Shoval S, Benenson I, "Micro-Simulation Model for Assessing the Risk of Vehicle–Pedestrian Road Accidents", Journal of Intelligent Transportation Systems: Technology, Planning, and Operations 19(1):63-77 02 Jan 2015.
- Shoval S., Efatmaneshnik M., Ryan M. J., "Assembly sequence planning for processes with heterogeneous reliabilities", International Journal of Production Research (IJPR), International Journal of Production Research, Vol. 55 (10), Pages 2806-2828, 2017.
- Hacohen S., Shoval S., Shvalb N., "Dynamic Model for Pedestrian Crossing in Congested Traffic Based on Probabilistic Navigation Function", Transportation Research Part C, 86, pages 78–96, 2018.
- Gennady Waizman, Shraga Shoval, Itzhak Benenson, "Traffic Accident Risk Assessment with Dynamic Microsimulation Model Using Range-Range Rate Graphs", Accident Analysis & Prevention, Volume 119, October 2018, Pages 248-262.
- Mark Frenkel, Leonid Dombrovsky, Victor Multanen, Viktor Danchuk, Irina Legchenkova, Shraga Shoval, Yelena Bormashenko, Bernard P. Binks, Edward Bormashenko, "Self-Propulsion of Water-Supported Liquid Marbles Filled with Sulfuric Acid", The Journal of Physical Chemistry Part B, 7936–7942, July 2018.
- Liron Yedidsion, Michael Hassoun, Shraga Shoval, Eran Simhon, "The Single Line Moving Target Traveling Salesman Problem with Release Times", Annals of Operations Research, October 2019, pp 1–10.
- Shraga Shoval, Yonit Baron, "Probabilistic Model for a Volleyball Team Formation with Rotations Modeled by Markov Chains", International Journal of Operational Research Society, March 2020.
- Pritam Kumar Roy, Edward Bormashenko, Mark Frenkel, Irina Legchenkova, Shraga Shoval, "Magnetic Field Induced Motion of Water Droplets and Bubbles on Lubricant Coated Surface", Colloids and Surfaces A: Physicochemical and Engineering Aspects, March 2020.
- Roy, Pritam; Frenkel, Mark; Legchenkova, Irina; Shoval, Shraga; Binks, Bernard; Bormashenko, Edward, "Liquid Marble-Induced Dewetting", The Journal of Physical Chemistry Part C, 124, 9345-9349, April 2020.
- Pritam Kumar Roy; Bernard P Binks; Irina Legchenkova; Syuji Fujii; Shraga Shoval, Edward Bormashenko, "Manufacture and Properties of Composite Liquid Marbles", Journal of Colloid and Interface Science, Vol. 575, pp. 35–41, April 2020.
- Roy, Pritam; Binks, Bernard; Fujii, Syuji; Shoval, Shraga; Bormashenko, Edward, "Composite Liquid Marbles as a Macroscopic Model System Representing Shedding of Enveloped Viruses", The Journal of Physical Chemistry Letters, May 2020, pp. 4279–4285.
- S Hacohen, S Shoval, N Shvalb, "The paradox of pedestrian's risk aversion", Accident Analysis & Prevention, Vol. 142,2019.
- M. Efatmaneshnik, S. Shoval, and K. Joiner, "System Test Architecture Evaluation: A Probabilistic Modeling Approach" IEEE Systems Journal, March, 2019.
- Mahmoud Efatmaneshnik and Shraga Shoval, "Managing Complexity of Assembly with Modularity: A Cost and Benefit Analysis", International Journal of Advanced Manufacturing Technology, April 2019.
- Pritam Kumar Roya, Shraga Shoval, Mirit Sharabi, Edward Bormashenko, "Soft Lithography with Liquid Marbles", Colloids and Surfaces A: Physicochemical and Engineering Aspects, Vol. 607, December 2020, (I.F. 3.131).
- Edward Bormashenko *, Pritam Kumar Roy, Shraga Shoval, Irina Legchenkova, "Interfacial Crystallization within Liquid Marbles", " Condensed Matters, 5(4), 2020, (I.F. 3.176).
- Cohen, Yuval; Shoval, Shraga; Faccio, Maurizio; Minto, Riccardo "Deploying Cobots in Collaborative Systems: Major Considerations and Productivity Analysis", International Journal of Production Research (IJPR), December 2020.
- Shurin, A., Davidovitch, N. & Shoval, S. (2020). The Role of the Capstone Project in Engineering Education in the Age of Industry 4.0 - A Case Study. The European Educational Researcher, 4(1), 63- 84.
- Roy, Pritam; Legchenkova, Irina; Shoval, Shraga; Bormashenko, Edward, "Interfacial Crystallization within Janus Saline Marbles", The Journal of Physical Chemistry Part C, 125(2). 1414-1420, December 2020.
- Pritam Kumar Roy, Irina Legchenkova, Shraga Shoval, Leonid A. Dombrovsky, Edward Bormashenko, "Osmotic Evolution of Composite Liquid Marbles", Journal of Colloid & Interface Science, 592, 167-173, February 2021.
- Abhishek Sharma, Shraga Shoval, Abhinav Sharma, Jitendra Kumar Pandey, "Path planning for multiple targets interception by the swarm of UAVs based on Swarm Intelligence (SI) algorithms: A Review", IETE Technical Review,1-23, February 2021.
- Yotam Sahar, Oren Musicant, Tomer Elbaum, Michael Wagner, Tehila Hirsh, Shraga Shoval, "Grip Force on Steering Wheel as a Measure of Stress", Frontiers Psychology, 12, 1036, March 2021.
- Efatmaneshnik Mahmoud, Shoval Shraga "Markovian Modelling of Process Scheduling for Reduced Cost of Rework and Scrap", accepted to International Journal of Production Research (IJPR), November 2021.
- Edward Bormashenko, Irina Legchenkova, Mark Frenkel, Nir Shvalb, Shraga Shoval, "Informational Measure of Symmetry vs. Voronoi Entropy and Continuous Measure of Entropy of the Penrose Tiling. Part II of the Voronoi Entropy vs. Continuous Measure of Symmetry of the Penrose Tiling", accepted for publication at Symmetry, November 2021. .
