= Stafford Sheehan =

American scientist and entrepreneur

Stafford W. Sheehan
- Education: Boston College, 2011; Yale University, Ph.D., 2016
- Years active: 2009–present
- Organization: Project Omega
- Title: Co-founder and CEO

Stafford W. Sheehan is an American scientist and entrepreneur, and is the founder and CEO of Project Omega, a company developing technology to recycle uranium and other materials from spent nuclear fuel. Prior to founding Project Omega, Sheehan was a co-founder and chief technology officer of Air Company, where he invented a heterogeneous catalysis process that converts carbon dioxide into hydrocarbons and alcohols to produce vodka and other consumer products, as well as jet fuel.

== Early life and education ==
Sheehan became interested in computer programming as a teenager. He originally intended to major in computer science with a minor in Arabic at Boston College but changed his concentration after taking a chemistry class his freshman year. As an undergraduate researcher in 2009, he was part of a team that developed a titanium nanostructure that provides greater conductivity and could be used to create more efficient solar panels.

Sheehan graduated with a degree in Chemistry from Boston College in 2011. He was subsequently a National Science Foundation graduate research fellow at Yale University where he worked on the development of gold-coated nanoparticles for solar cells and catalysts for artificial photosynthesis. He earned his Ph.D. in physical chemistry from Yale in 2016. His thesis titled "Photon Management and Water Oxidation Catalysts for Artificial Photosynthesis" was awarded Yale's Richard Wolfgang Prize which is given each year to the best doctoral theses by graduating chemistry students.

== Career ==
Sheehan founded Catalytic Innovations in 2015. The company was spun out from his research at Yale. Early in his research into artificial photosynthesis, he had discovered an Iridium-based catalyst which can also be used as an anti-corrosion coating for oil pipelines or to prevent lead from getting into wastewater during the metal refinery process.

In 2017, Sheehan co-founded Air Company where he served as president and chief technology officer. Air Company produces ethanol-based products using heterogeneous catalysis to hydrogenate carbon dioxide (CO_{2}) to produce ethanol (C_{2}H_{5}OH). Unlike other catalysts used in hydrogenation, this catalyst contains no precious metals and produces ethanol sufficiently pure enough for use in beverages, foods, cosmetics, cleaning products, and fragrances with oxygen and water as the only byproducts. Sheehan left Air Company in December, 2024.

During his tenure at Air company, Sheehan led the company's participation in the Defense Innovation Unit's (DIU) Project SynCE, an initiative focused on producing synthetic jet fuel from carbon dioxide to solve critical problems in contested logistics, and proved the efficacy of the fuel by powering a U.S. Air Force unmanned drone fighter jet for the first time on July 27, 2022, at the Hsu STEM Range in Laurel Hill, Florida.

== Publications ==
- Sheehan, Stafford W.; Lin, Yongjing; et al. (March 2, 2011). "Nanonet-Based Hematite Heteronanostructures for Efficient Solar Water Splitting". Journal of the American Chemical Society. 133 (8): 2398–2401. Bibcode:2011JAChS.133.2398L. doi:10.1021/ja110741z. ISSN 0002-7863. PMID 21306153.
- —; Lin, Yongjing; et al. (2011). "Hematite-based solar water splitting: challenges and opportunities". Energy & Environmental Science. 4 (12): 4862. Bibcode:2011EnEnS...4.4862L. doi:10.1039/c1ee01850g. ISSN 1754-5692.
- —; Liu, Rui; et al. (January 10, 2011). "Water Splitting by Tungsten Oxide Prepared by Atomic Layer Deposition and Decorated with an Oxygen-Evolving Catalyst". Angewandte Chemie International Edition. 50 (2): 499–502. Bibcode:2011ACIE...50..499L. doi:10.1002/anie.201004801. PMID 21154542.
- —; Chen, Chi; et al. (November 2018). "Progress toward Commercial Application of Electrochemical Carbon Dioxide Reduction". Chem. 4 (11): 2571–2586. Bibcode:2018Chem....4.2571C. doi:10.1016/j.chempr.2018.08.019. S2CID 187151824.
- —; Lin, Yongjing; et al. (May 2011). "Semiconductor nanostructure-based photoelectrochemical water splitting: A brief review". Chemical Physics Letters. 507 (4–6): 209–215. Bibcode:2011CPL...507..209L. doi:10.1016/j.cplett.2011.03.074.
- —; Ardo, Shane; et al. (2018). "Pathways to electrochemical solar-hydrogen technologies". Energy & Environmental Science. 11 (10): 2768–2783. Bibcode:2018EnEnS..11.2768A. doi:10.1039/C7EE03639F. hdl:1887/69523. ISSN 1754-5692. S2CID 103860248.
- —; Lin, Yongjing; et al. (March 4, 2009). "TiO 2 /TiSi 2 Heterostructures for High-Efficiency Photoelectrochemical H 2 O Splitting". Journal of the American Chemical Society. 131 (8): 2772–2773. Bibcode:2009JAChS.131.2772L. doi:10.1021/ja808426h. ISSN 0002-7863. PMID 19209858.
- —; Thomsen, Julianne M.; et al. (May 2015). "A molecular catalyst for water oxidation that binds to metal oxide surfaces". Nature Communications. 6 (1): 6469. Bibcode:2015NatCo...6.6469S. doi:10.1038/ncomms7469. ISSN 2041-1723. PMC 4382695. PMID 25757425.
