= Air Company =

American engineering company

AIRCO
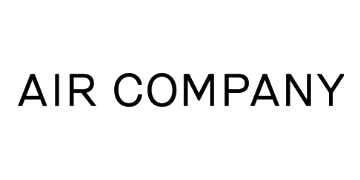
- Type: Private
- Industry: Engineering; Beverage
- Founded: 2017; 9 years ago in Brooklyn, New York
- Founders: Gregory Constantine (CEO); Stafford Sheehan (CTO)
- Headquarters: New York, U.S.
- Products: Vodka and other ethanol-based products
- Website: aircompany.com

Air Company is an American engineering company, beverage maker, and producer of ethanol products based in New York City. Founded in 2017 by Gregory Constantine and Stafford Sheehan, Air Company's chief product is vodka made from carbon dioxide, a greenhouse gas that significantly contributes to climate change, which the process captures and converts to ethanol pure enough for human consumption.

The company first released its carbon negative vodka in November 2019 in the New York City area. Air Company is also developing its ethanol production process for use in producing other products. This includes working with NASA as part of the CO_{2} Conversion Challenge to produce glucose for use in space as a food source.

== History ==
Air Company was founded in 2017 by Gregory Constantine, who previously worked as a marketer for beverage producer Diageo, and Stafford Sheehan, a chemist with a Ph.D. from Yale University. Sheehan created a process for producing ethanol from carbon dioxide, a greenhouse gas that significantly contributes to climate change. In 2019, the company opened a 2,500-square-foot (230 m^{2}) facility in the Bushwick neighborhood of Brooklyn, New York. Constantine is chief executive officer, and Sheehan is chief technical officer.

Air Company was the winner of the 2017 United Nations Ideas4Change award. In 2019, Air Company won a gold medal in the Ultra Premium vodka category after a blind taste test at the Luxury Masters competition held annually by The Spirits Business magazine. In May 2019, Air Company was one of five winners of the first phase of NASA's CO_{2} Conversion Challenge, part of the Centennial Challenges. The company is working with NASA to explore the use of ethanol created by its process to produce glucose for use in space as a food source.

The company officially released its first vodka in November 2019 in the New York City area, including at Michelin-star restaurants like Eleven Madison Park and Gramercy Tavern. As of March 2020, Air Company was one of ten finalists for the Carbon XPrize which awards two prizes of $7.5 million to teams that develop the most financially profitable uses for carbon dioxide. By then, more than 60 venues in New York City area had committed to selling the vodka in their establishments before the advent of the COVID-19 pandemic. In November 2020, Air Vodka was recognized by Time magazine as one of "The Best Inventions of 2020".

As the pandemic began to spread, Air Company began using the process to produce hand sanitizer. Other uses in development also include perfumes and rocket fuel. Air Company is also creating a facility in Ontario that is about ten times the size of its Brooklyn distillery. By May 2022, Air Company had raised $40 million in funding including from Toyota, JetBlue, and Parley for the Oceans.

== Production process ==
Air Company uses heterogeneous catalysis to hydrogenate carbon dioxide (CO_{2}) to produce ethanol (C_{2}H_{5}OH). The catalyst developed by Sheehan, unlike other catalysts used in hydrogenation, contains no precious metals. It produces ethanol sufficiently pure enough for use in beverages, foods, cosmetics, pharmaceuticals, cleaning products, and fragrances with oxygen and water as the only byproducts. It also creates less of other alcohol byproducts such as propanol, butanol, and pentanol. The CO_{2} captured in the production of a bottle of Air Vodka is roughly equivalent to the carbon dioxide consumed by eight trees in a day.

Air Vodka has a net-negative CO_{2} emissions level of 1.45 to 1.47 per a mass unit of ethanol produced. Its CO_{2} supply comes mostly from the byproducts of traditional alcohol producers and ethanol factories that use fermentation of sugars in their distillery process. The CO_{2} is liquefied at a Niagara Falls facility that is powered by hydroelectric energy and transported to Air Company's distillery in Brooklyn. The hydrogen supply is generated by electrolyzing water using solar power and releases oxygen in the process.
