= Edupunk =

Teaching method

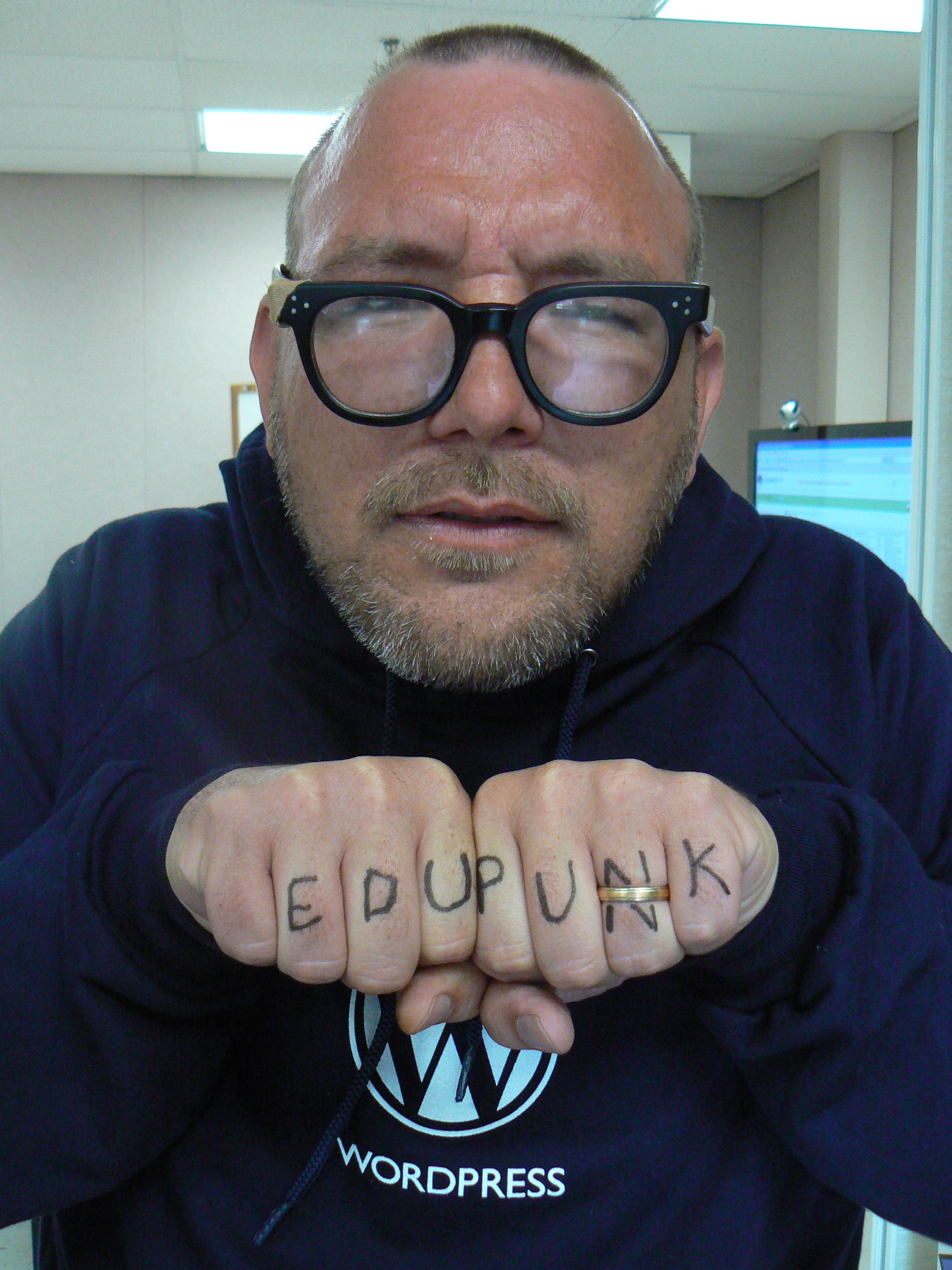
Jim Groom as "poster boy" for edupunk

Edupunk is a do it yourself (DIY) attitude to teaching and learning practices. Tom Kuntz described edupunk as "an approach to teaching that avoids mainstream tools like PowerPoint and Blackboard, and instead aims to bring the rebellious attitude and DIY ethos of ’70s bands like The Clash to the classroom." Many instructional applications can be described as DIY education or edupunk.

The term was first used on May 25, 2008, by Jim Groom in his blog, and covered less than a week later in the Chronicle of Higher Education. Stephen Downes, an online education theorist and an editor for the International Journal of Instructional Technology and Distance Learning, noted that "the concept of edupunk has totally caught wind, spreading through the blogosphere like wildfire".

== Aspects ==
Edupunk has risen from an objection to the efforts of government and corporate interests in reframing and bundling emerging technologies into cookie-cutter products with pre-defined application—somewhat similar to traditional punk ideologies.

The reaction to corporate influence on education is only one part of edupunk, though. Stephen Downes has identified three aspects to this approach:

- Reaction against commercialization of learning
- Do-it-yourself attitude
- Thinking and learning for yourself

== Examples ==
An example of edupunk was the University of British Columbia's course "Wikipedia:WikiProject Murder Madness and Mayhem" experiment of creating articles on Wikipedia in spring 2008, "(having) one’s students as partners and peers." A video clip illustrating an edupunk approach, produced by Tony Hirst at the Open University in the UK, on 8 June 2008, illustrated how quickly the edupunk concept has been adopted outside North America. A website set up by Australian educators illustrates how edupunk spread, and a presentation by Norm Friesen of Thompson Rivers University identifies a number of possible intellectual precursors for the movement.

Hampshire College, Evergreen State College, Marlboro College, New College of Florida, and Warren Wilson College are collegiate institutions imbued with edupunk ideology.

== See also ==
- Democratic education
- Self-directed learning
- Student-centered education
- Unschooling
- Anarchistic free school
- Critical pedagogy
- Autodidacticism
- Massive Open Online Courses (MOOCs)
