= Hometalk =

Online DIY platform

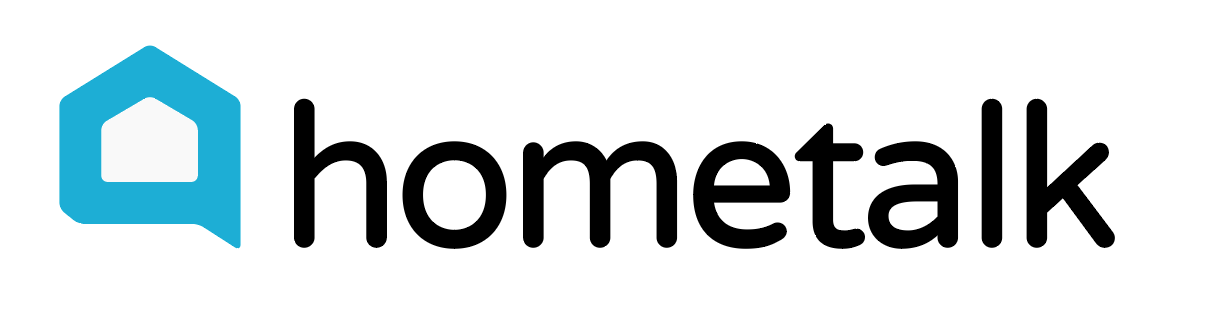
- Founders: Yaron Ben Shaul, Miriam Illions, Celeste Kumelos
- Website: www.hometalk.com
- Launched: March 2011; 15 years ago
- Current status: Active

Hometalk is an online platform that enables people to improve their living spaces through DIY.

Founded in 2011 and based in New York City, Hometalk has over 17 million registered users and 23 million monthly visits. There are over 140,000 home improvement tutorials on the site (which have collectively been viewed over 1 billion times), sorted in categories such as kitchen design, gardening, and bedroom ideas.

== Company ==
Hometalk was founded by Yaron Ben Shaul, Miriam Illions and Celeste Kumelos in 2011. In 2012, the company relaunched the Hometalk website with several new features resulting in the acquisition of more than 100,000 members and 400,000 Facebook fans.

Hometalk was listed among The Next Web's “ten of the best apps for home and work from 2012", and by the end of 2013, site visits increased from 2 million to over 4 million. In February, 2014, Hometalk members co-hosted live Pinterest parties at 100 Michael's stores throughout the United States, and then, two months later, Hometalk was listed as a Webby Award Honoree in the 18th annual Webby Awards.

In 2016, Hometalk was voted #1 in The Next Web's list of "60 of the fastest growing companies in tech".

Also in 2016, Hometalk made its first big push into Facebook video. The Wall Street Journal then featured the company's surge in video virality, citing its eco-friendly oven-cleaning video that garnered 38 million views in under three weeks. In October, another video surpassed 55 million views, and The Next Web cited a reason for the video's virality: "Perhaps the video embodies the very ethos of Hometalk: People empower and teach each other to make their homes better (without spending more money!)." Hometalk partnered with a talented group of video creators who have successfully driven well over a billion Facebook video views to over a thousand videos. (Hometalk's most popular video has 112 million views.)

Hometalk has been monetizing its platform through programmatic advertising. But as for its future, Hometalk's then-CEO Ben Shaul explained: “Our mission is to become the end-to-end DIY destination, whereby we not only inspire people with awesome content, but we also empower them to do the projects themselves. This includes the ability to teach Hometalkers more DIY skills, to get them the relevant materials, and to connect them with each other to DIY together. Each of these initiatives has strong business components, too, which would enable us to diversify from our current revenue source - programmatic ads.”

== Community ==
Hometalk's attracts a targeted userbase of home and garden consumers: 95% are female, 94% are over the age of 35, and 85% reside in the USA. Hometalk has built a social network for DIYers. Unlike instructional videos on YouTube or the one-way communication on many how-to sites, Hometalk is a community where members can ask questions about projects and get responses within minutes.

== Media ==
Hometalk is often featured across various media outlets, such as Huffington Post, Country Living, Fox & Friends, NBC, and The Today Show.
