= App =

App, Apps or APP may refer to:

== Science and technology ==
=== Computing ===
- Application software, or app, a computer program designed to carry out a specific task:
  - Mobile app, designed to run on a mobile device
  - Web application or web app, designed to run in a web browser
- App (file format), used by HarmonyOS
- Adjusted Peak Performance, a metric to measure computing performance in 64-bit processors and above
- Application Portability Profile, NIST standards and specifications for the Open System Environment
- Atom Publishing Protocol, simple HTTP-based protocol for creating and updating web resources

=== Other uses in science and technology ===
- Acute-phase protein, a class of proteins
- Amyloid-beta precursor protein, a protein
- Atactic polypropylene, a hot-melt adhesive

== Arts, entertainment and media ==
- App (film), a 2013 Dutch film
- Apps (film), a 2021 anthology horror fantasy film
- The App, a 2019 Italian drama
- Asbury Park Press, a newspaper of Monmouth County, New Jersey, US
- Archive of Public Protests, a collective of photographers and writers and their work documenting protests in Poland
- The Alan Parsons Project, former British rock band

== Businesses and organizations ==
=== Businesses ===
- Asia Pulp & Paper, a pulp and paper company based in Jakarta, Indonesia
- Associated Press of Pakistan, a national news agency of Pakistan
- Association of Pickleball Players, a professional pickleball tour
- Association of Professional Piercers, an international organization for body piercing

=== Political parties ===
- All People's Party (disambiguation), several political parties
- People's Progressive Alliance (Mauritania) (Alliance populaire progressiste)
- Animal Protection Party, in England
- Australian Protectionist Party
- Aggrupation of Parties for Prosperity, in the Philippines
- Alliance for the Homeland (Alianța pentru Patrie, ApP), in Romania

=== Other organizations ===
- Justice Defenders, formerly African Prisons Project, a charity
- Alberta Provincial Police, a former Canadian police force
- American Principles Project, a political advocacy group
- Asia-Pacific Partnership on Clean Development and Climate

== People ==
- App (surname)
- Apps (surname)

== Other uses ==
- Appleby railway station, England, station code APP
- Appleton, Wisconsin, United States (by Amtrak station code)
- Assessing Pupils' Progress, an assessment methodology used in schools in England and Wales
- Advanced practice provider, another term for a mid-level practitioner

== See also ==
- .app (disambiguation)
- Authorised push payment fraud, or APP fraud
