= Field training exercise =

Training scenario conducted by military units

A field training exercise, generally shortened to the acronym "FTX" or simply referred to as going to "the field", is a coordinated exercise conducted by military units for training purposes. These are often military simulations conducted in open areas instead of training facilities or military academies, such as training areas, bombing ranges, and even closed-off, typically publicly-accessible areas.

== In active duty ==
Field training exercises are usually practice "mini-battles" which provide fairly realistic scenarios and situations based on actual situations a unit might face if deployed. While squad and platoon sized units can conduct an FTX, most of these exercises involve units ranging from a company up to a regiment or brigade. Field training exercises rarely reach division strength.

The exercise is usually carefully planned out by field grade or general officers, usually without disclosing plans or other information to company-grade officers. This makes the situation more unpredictable and realistic since company-grade officers make the majority of quick and immediate decisions on the battlefield. Nearly every possibility is considered during planning, and often the scenarios can be more difficult or more far-fetched than actual battles, thus sharpening the skills of those participating to a level which will surpass that of the enemy.

== In basic training ==
Most nation's armed forces implement field training exercises into their basic military training courses. The purpose of this is to give soon-to-be soldiers a taste of battle before they leave basic training, and can act as a medium to perform summative and formative assessments. This also allows instructors to look for mistakes and correct them before their recruits graduate their course and potentially go to battle.

== U.S. military examples ==
All branches of the United States Armed Forces utilise field training exercises in their basic training courses for enlistees and officers. In the Army and often in other branches, the last few days of basic training are used to conduct a field training exercise where recruits can practice the skills they have learned over the past several weeks of training.

- The 101st Airborne Division is famous for its field training exercises. Most of its brigades or regiments conduct their own field training exercises annually, and has conducted division wide exercises on occasion. These exercises generally consist of the entire unit deploying to the location by parachute, followed by multi-day engagements with the "enemy".
- The United States Air Force conducts Operation Red Flag four to six times a year. This is a multifaceted field training exercise consisting of various things such as air-to-air and air-to-ground engagements, mid-air refueling, reconnaissance, close air support, airlift, rescue operations, and special forces operations.

== See also ==
- Recruit training
- Composite Unit Training Exercise
