= Problem set =

List of problems given as homework

A problem set, sometimes shortened as pset, is a teaching tool used by many universities. Most courses in physics, math, engineering, chemistry, and computer science will regularly give problem sets. They can also appear in other subjects, such as economics.

It is essentially a list of several mildly difficult problems or exercises based on material already taught, which the student is expected to solve with a full written solution. There is no further research involved, and the goal is to learn and become familiar with the material and solving typical problems. They are usually issued once every week or two weeks, and due one or two weeks later. If used as part of a summative assessment they are usually given a low weight, between 10% and 25% of the total mark of the course for all problem sets put together, and sometimes will count for nothing if the student receives a better grade on the exam. Alternatively, problem sets may be used purely for formative assessment and do not count towards a degree.

Many students work in groups to solve them and help get a better understanding of the material, but most professors require each student to hand in their own individual problem set. Some professors explicitly encourage collaboration, some allow it, and some explicitly disallow it or consider it cheating. Most, however, do not disallow collaboration, because they see the goal as primarily pedagogical. This is to be distinguished from larger, more important assignments, for which students are still expected to work independently.

Collaboration on problem sets has caused controversy, including a media storm around a student of Toronto Metropolitan University, Chris Avenir, who started a forum on the social networking site Facebook for others to post their solutions. The professor failed him for his actions and recommended him for expulsion; the university faculty appeal committee overturned the recommended penalty and instead gave a zero grade for the assignments that were done through the course of the semester.

== Examples ==
- An example of a typical problem set, from MIT's relativity (physics) class
  A list of all of the problem sets from that class, on MIT OpenCourseWare. In this case they are collectively worth 20% of the total mark.
