= Israel La'ad =

Israeli charity

- ישראל לעד
- Formation: 2004; 21 years ago
- Type: Charity
- Headquarters: Israel
- Services: Afternoon homework assistance, Ride for Pride bike program, food delivery program for the elderly

Israel La'ad is an Israeli charity founded in 2004 to aid the underprivileged through a variety of programs: afternoon homework assistance, and a Ride for Pride bike riding program for teenagers at risk, and a food delivery program for the elderly.

== Afternoon Homework Assistance ==
The afternoon homework assistance program helps 6, 7 & 8th grade youth at risk develop skills necessary to become successful students. This age group appears to be the most receptive to this type of aid.

Israel La'ad works with children who are identified by welfare agencies as being in danger of dropping out of school or of getting involved with crime or drugs. Priority is given to children of immigrants who suffer from a high rate of unemployment and who have had difficulty integrating within Israeli society. These kids live in homes that cannot provide basic learning tools or conditions necessary to do homework or review school lessons.

The program provides teachers who work with between 3 and 5 children. After the teacher identifies each child's weakness, the kids are referred to a teacher for 1 on 1 tutoring the best kind of tutoring you can give.

== Ride for Pride ==
"Ride for Pride" is a bike program for youth at risk of dropping out of school. It provides children with an incentive and reward for working hard in school. It instills in them a sense of belonging and achievement and a love and appreciation of Israel. Ride for pride started in 2005 in the towns of Qatzrin and Gedera.

The project has received enthusiastic feedback from teachers and social workers who are impressed with the transformation the children have experienced. It has gotten children from low socio-economic backgrounds to excel at school and introduced them to a healthy sport they might otherwise have been denied.

== Feed the Hungry ==
"Feed the Hungry" is a food delivery program that operates in the towns of Ashdod, Yavne' and Kiryat Malachi, where the need is significant. Volunteers deliver "Weekend Baskets" of basic necessities every Thursday evening to over 500 needy families. Recipients are mainly elderly and lonely people including many Holocaust survivors in their 70s or 80s, or new immigrants. The program also assists younger families experiencing economic stress or extended periods of unemployment. It provides the needy with a ray of hope and a steady supply of ample nourishing food
