= Backward design =

Educational design method

Backward Design model

Backward design is a method of designing an educational curriculum by setting goals before choosing instructional methods and forms of assessment. It shifts curriculum planning, both on large and small scales, to focusing on identifying the desired learning outcomes and then creating learning activities to reach the learning goals. Backward design of curriculum typically involves three stages:

1. Identify the results desired (big ideas and skills)
  - What the students should know, understand, and be able to do
  - Consider the goals and curriculum expectations
  - Focus on the "big ideas" (principles, theories, concepts, point of views, or themes)
2. Determine acceptable levels of evidence that support that the desired results have occurred (culminating assessment tasks)
  - What teachers will accept as evidence that student understanding took place
  - Consider culminating assessment tasks and a range of assessment methods (observations, tests, projects, etc.)
3. Design activities that will make desired results happen (learning events)
  - What knowledge and skills students will need to achieve the desired results
  - Consider teaching methods, sequence of lessons, and resource materials

When considering these three stages it is also important to know what backward design is not. Davis et al (2021) shared these important points about backward design:

- A textbook is not the starting point for course design.
- When designing a course, or curriculum, it should not be assumed the learners will extract learning information through chance.
- The design focus should not be toward an exam and should only focus on content that will meet the learning outcomes.
- A design should not contain content that does not relate to learning outcomes.

All these factors can omit important content and hinder the development of critical thinking skills.

Backward design challenges "traditional" methods of curriculum planning. In traditional curriculum planning, a list of content that will be taught is created and/or selected. In backward design, the educator starts with goals, creates or plans out assessments, and finally makes lesson plans. Supporters of backward design liken the process to using a "road map". In this case, the destination is chosen first and then the road map is used to plan the trip to the desired destination. In contrast, in traditional curriculum planning there is no formal destination identified before the journey begins.

The idea in backward design is to teach toward the "end point" or learning goals, which typically ensures that content taught remains focused and organized. This, in turn, aims at promoting better understanding of the content or processes to be learned for students. The educator is able to focus on addressing what the students need to learn, what data can be collected to show that the students have learned the desired outcomes (or learning standards) and how to ensure the students will learn. Incorporating backward design into a curriculum can help support students’ readiness to transition from theoretical content knowledge to practice. Although backward design is based on the same components of the ADDIE model, backward design is a condensed version of these components with far less flexibility.

== Curriculum design, and instructional design ==
Backward design is often used in conjunction with two other terms: curriculum design and instructional design.

Curriculum design is the act of designing or developing curricula for students. Curricula may differ from country to country and further still between provinces or states within a country. A curriculum is based on benchmark standards deemed important by the government. Typically, the time frame of attainment of these outcomes or standards is set by physical age.

Instructional design is the design of learning experiences and instructions for the acquisition of knowledge and skill by students. In addition, instructional design models or theories may be thought of as frameworks for developing courses, modules and lessons that increase and enhance learning and encourage engagement .

There are numerous instructional design models available to instructors that hold significant importance when planning and implementing curriculum. Many of the models are quite similar in that they essentially all address the same four components in some form or another: the learners; the learning objectives; the method of instruction; and some form of assessment or evaluation. Based around those components, the instructor then has the opportunity to choose the design model and stages that work best for them in their specific situation. This way they can achieve the appropriate learning outcomes or create a plan or strategy for improvement. As learners and instructors may vary, instructional design must be a good fit for both and therefore different models can have behavioral, cognitive or constructivist roots.

== History ==
Ralph W. Tyler introduced the idea of "backward design" (without using this particular term) in 1949 when referring to a statement of objectives. A statement of objectives is used to indicate the kinds of changes in the student to be brought about so that instructional activities can be planned and developed in a way likely to attain these objectives.

The term "backward design" was introduced to curriculum design in 1998/99 by Jay McTighe and Grant Wiggins (Understanding by Design). The somewhat idiosyncratic term is ultimately due to James S. Coleman, who in his Foundations of Social Theory (1990) used it to parallel the term "backward policing" which he coined for a policy which he found in the production process in Honda factories.

== Advantages ==
According to Doug Buehl (2000), advantages of backward design include:

- Students are not as likely to become so lost in the factual detail of a unit that they miss the point of studying the original topic.
- Instruction looks toward global understandings and not just daily activities; daily lessons are constructed with a focus on what the overall "gain" from the unit is to be.
- Assessment is designed before lesson planning, so that instruction drives students toward exactly what they need to know.

== The importance of assessment ==
The primary starting point for backward design is to become familiar with the standards/outcomes for the grade level and curriculum being taught. The second part of curriculum planning with backward design is finding appropriate assessments. It can be difficult for "traditional" educators to switch to this model because it is hard to conceptualize an assessment before deciding on lessons and instruction. The idea is that the assessments (formative or summative) should meet the initial goals identified.

Wiggins and McTighe (2008) also utilize the "WHERE" approach during the assessment stage of the process.

- W stands for students knowing where they are heading, why they are heading there, what they know, where they might go wrong in the process, and what is required of them.
- H stands for hooking the students on the topic of study.
- E stands for students exploring and experiencing ideas and being equipped with the necessary understanding to master the standard or outcome being taught.
- R stands for providing opportunities for students to rehearse, revise, and refine their work.
- E stands for student evaluation.

== Other models of instructional design ==
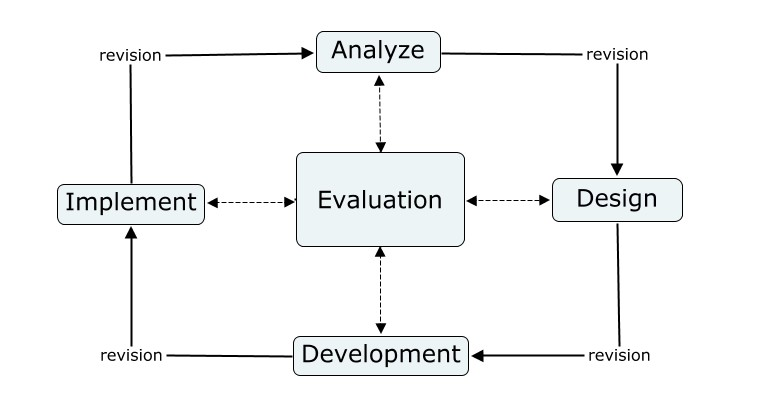
ADDIE model of design

=== ADDIE model of design ===
Most models of instructional design follow the core elements found in the ADDIE model of design: analyze (designer develops an understanding of the desired outcomes and the learner's knowledge and skills); design (documents learning outcomes, assessment tools, exercise and content); develop (creating the learning materials); implement (the created learning materials are distributed to the learners); and evaluate (the effectiveness of the learning materials is assessed and documented). Many instructional designers and training developers use the ADDIE model as a generic process for creating other models. This model is purposely not designed to be followed in a linear step-by-step fashion, but rather is circular so that it is possible to re-trace steps once data have been collected and analyzed.

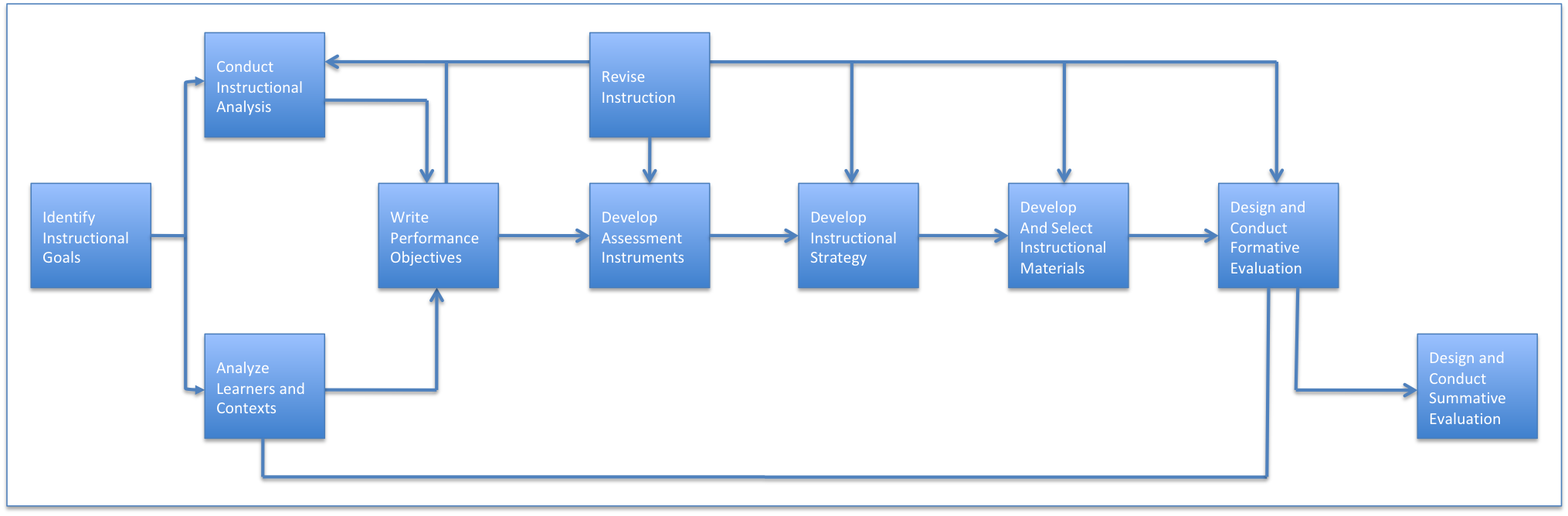
Dick and Carey Model

=== Dick and Carey model (also known as the systems approach model) ===
The Dick and Carey model is made up of nine different stages which are meant to be executed in parallel, rather than linear, fashion, but this model still follows the same basic instructional design pattern of the ADDIE model, as does backward design. The Dick and Carey model focuses on the interrelationship between context, content, learning and instruction, and addresses instruction as an entire system. In this model, all of the components of this model work together to enable learners to meet the desired learning outcomes. The model includes the following components:

1. Identify instructional goals
2. Conduct instructional analysis
3. Identify entry behaviors and learner characteristics
4. Write performance objectives
5. Develop assessment instruments
6. Develop instructional strategy
7. Develop and select instructional materials
8. Design and conduct formative evaluation of instruction
9. Design and conduct summative evaluation.

Both the Dick and Carey model and the backward design model are goal and objective oriented; assessment is created based on learning objectives and goals, and instruction is created based on evaluation and assessment. The Dick and Carey model, however, is a more systemic model in that making changes to components affects other components and, therefore, the changes occur in parallel. In the more linear backward design model, the steps are non-flexible which means that skipping or changing steps is not an option.

=== Kemp instructional design model (also known as the Morrison, Ross and Kemp model) ===
The Kemp instructional design model is a holistic form of instructional design, taking into account all factors of the learning environment. It is very systemic and also follows the same basic design pattern of the ADDIE model. The Kemp model is much more focused on the individual learner needs and goals by following nine components:

1. Identify instructional problems, and specify goals for designing an instructional program
2. Examine learner characteristics that should receive attention during planning
3. Identify subject content, and analyze task components related to stated goals and purposes
4. State instructional objectives for the learner
5. Sequence content within each instructional unit for logical learning
6. Design instructional strategies so that each learner can master the objectives
7. Plan the instructional message and delivery
8. Develop evaluation instruments to assess objectives
9. Select resources to support instruction and learning activities.

The largest difference between backward design and the Kemp model is that the Kemp model is meant to be used on a smaller scale. This allows for easier adaptations to be made for individual lessons and individual learners. It also places more emphasis on support and service for learners and instruction.

== Supporting research using backward design ==
- Shumway and Barrett (2004) used the backward design model to strengthen pre-service teachers' attitudes towards teaching. The experience appears to have allowed the pre-service teachers to do exactly that after using both the backward design model and a modified backward design. These pre-service teachers became more excited about their teaching profession and became better prepared as student teachers through the backward design that they had experienced.
- In the article, Essential Questions — Inclusive Answers (C.M. Jorgenson, 1995), Souhegan High School followed the steps of a backwards design model to reach all levels of student ability and create a school that promoted full inclusion. They concluded that all involved had experienced a richer experience because of the implementation of the backward design model.
- In An Integration of "Backwards Planning" Unit Design with the "Two Step" Lesson Planning Framework (Jones et al., 2009), a framework for employing backward planning in designing individual lessons is provided. Educators are provided with an integrated framework and more importantly a case study of the backward lesson planning in action.
- In the article, Backward Design (Childre, Sands, and Pope, 2009), examples of backward design are shown improving learning at both the elementary and high school levels. The research targets the depth of understanding for all learners. The fact that much research avoids the inclusion of special needs students is noted. The traditional instructional approaches that fail to engage disabled students were not an issue when backward design was implemented. The backward design was found to provide meaning and relevance to all levels of students.

== Application ==
Here is a practical example of a 5th grade teacher developing a three-week unit on nutrition:

Stage 1: Identify desired results

Based on three curriculum expectations about nutrition (concepts about nutrition, elements of a balanced diet, and understanding eating patterns), the take-away message that the teacher wants his/her students to understand is "Students will use an understanding of the element of good nutrition to plan a balanced diet for themselves and others".

Stage 2: Determine acceptable evidence

The teacher has created an authentic task in which students will design a 3-day meal plan for a camp that uses food pyramid guidelines. The goal is a tasty and nutritionally balanced menu.

Stage 3: Plan learning experiences and instruction

The teacher first considers the knowledge and skills that students will need in order to complete the authentic assessment. Specifically, students will need to know about different food groups, human nutritional needs (carbohydrates, proteins, sugars, vitamins, minerals etc.), and about what foods provide these needs. They will need to know how to read nutrition labels. Resources will be a pamphlet from the UDSA on food groups, the health textbook, and a video "Nutrition for You". Teaching methods will include direct instruction, inductive methods, cooperative learning, and group activities.

== Criticisms ==
Although this approach is widely accepted, the following are criticisms of the backward design approach:

- Difficulties in dealing with issues of validity and reliability
- Textbooks and content standards do not always explicitly highlight the key concepts that students should learn
- This approach provides teachers with little support about how to enhance understanding of their students and the way people learn
- Teachers may misunderstand and misinterpret what their students should learn and what the big ideas are
- Teacher effectiveness is measured more on the success of the students based on formulated assessments rather than ability to connect knowledge and skills to the needs and interests of students. Thus, lack of concern with social and cultural differences within the classroom
- This process promotes lesson design through deductive reasoning. It does not fit in well in a constructivist ontology where the multifaceted nature of each student warrants consideration in planning. Similarly, it leaves little room for improvisation.
- Teachers who know their curriculum and lesson trajectory that was led by Backwards Design may find that over adherence depletes their ability to focus on the learning experience and, with students or colleagues, induce new routes towards learning goals. A focus on principles of creative development such as contextual probing, improvisation, and juxtaposition may lead students to discover and know that which was unanticipated by the teacher or curriculum developers. In this, BD is incomplete or a potential recipe for student boredom.
- Desired results may fall short of student potential. This model assumes the relative level of students, yet students may have the capacity to go beyond desired results. In assuming an end goal, students are not empowered to reach for their own goals or to follow a process that may lead to results that surprise both the student and the teacher. For the master teacher, it would be worthwhile to move past fixed goals and establish processes and student choices that lead them to relevant yet indeterminate locations.

== See also ==
- Assessment for learning – Method in education
- Lesson plan – Description of the course of instruction for a lesson
- Ralph W. Tyler – American educator (1902–1994)
- Outcome-based education – Educational system based on the desired goals
- Understanding by Design
