= Alicia C. Alonzo =

American scholar of science education

Alicia Cristina Alonzo is an American scholar of science education specializing in educational assessment, formative assessment, and pedagogical content knowledge. She is a professor in the Department of Teacher Education at Michigan State University.

== Education and career ==
Alonzo was an undergraduate at Cornell University. She has a 1999 Ph.D. from the California Institute of Technology, supervised by Thomas McGill, on the fabrication of laser diodes.

Soon after, her interests shifted to science education. After positions in educational research at the University of California, Berkeley and the University of Iowa, Alonzo became an assistant professor at Michigan State University in 2009.

== Recognition ==
Alonzo was a 2014 recipient of the Presidential Early Career Award for Scientists and Engineers, given "for her outstanding research on learning progressions in physics, and for her community service commitment to helping high school teachers use formative assessments in their classrooms to enhance student learning in summer professional development workshops and undergraduate courses".
