= Assessing Pupils' Progress =

Assessing Pupils' Progress (APP) has been developed for use in schools in England and Wales to enable them to apply Assessment for Learning (AfL) consistently across both the secondary and primary National Curriculum. APP assessment guidelines were finalised in 2008 for Mathematics, English, Science and ICT. Initial development of APP was undertaken by the National Strategies but is now overseen by the Qualifications and Curriculum Development Agency (QCDA). Currently the status of APP is that it is 'recommended' that schools use it but it is not statutory. With the change in UK government in May 2010, the status of APP could change. Ofsted said APP was unnecessary in 2010, and the APP documents have not been on the Department for Education's website since 2011. The coalition government has got rid of it.

UK schools began implementing Assessment for Learning in 2001 and the approach is now well embedded. APP provides nationally recognised areas of Assessment Focus for teachers to assess. APP has been part of the reason for making National Curriculum Tests optional for all but Year 6.

== APP in Mathematics ==
APP for mathematics consists of 208 areas of Assessment Focus (AF) across levels 1 to 8, giving between 20 and 25 areas for a pupil to complete per level. The optional National Curriculum tests have tended to test a narrow part of the National Curriculum whereas APP gives a much broader picture. The Assessment Foci can be quite specific, such as "plot graphs of quadratic and cubic functions". Some areas are less traditional and have come as something of a surprise to those who have worked with them. For example, at Level 7 pupils are required to "find the locus of a point that moves according to a specific rule, e.g. the vertex of a square as it rolls along a line": an area that has certainly never been tested in a National Curriculum test.

== How APP in Mathematics differs from traditional assessment ==
Formative Assessment has been defined as 'activities undertaken by teachers, and by their students in assessing themselves, which provide information to be used as feedback to modify the teaching and learning activities in which they are engaged'. In the past the focus for assessment has often been summative assessment which is taken after a pupil has completed a unit of work, and often at the end of a school year. APP is formative assessment in that teachers can use it whilst an AF is being taught and use the results to inform their planning.

In practical terms, APP allows teachers to use evidence from their everyday teaching to assess a pupils capability on an AF. This can include evidence gathered by talking to pupils whilst they undertake group work, matching activities and team games. The use of mini-whiteboards and slides on an interactive white board are also becoming common. In addition, work done on more traditional worksheets can also count towards a teachers judgement. APP is not seen as a series of mini tests but as a means of giving pupils multiple opportunities to demonstrate their understanding of work. In the secondary school phase, APP links closely to Personal Learning and Thinking Skills (PLTS) where pupils are expected to show determination in solving problems and work as part of a team. APP also has close links with the 2010 GCSE specification and its increased emphasis on problem solving. There isn't, however, any intention that APP should be tackled through the use of coursework.

== Timeline for the deployment of APP in core subjects ==
All schools in England and Wales received training on APP during the academic year 2008/9. During 2009/10 schools have been expected to trial APP with at least one Year group with a view to fully embedding the approach from September 2010. Any school that has not fully embedded APP by September 2010 will be offered further training to enable them to do so.

== Sources ==
- National Strategies Primary Phase
- National Strategies Secondary Mathematics
- Examples of APP mathematics materials
- National Strategies APP pamphlet
- TES article on APP at KS3
- TES article on APP at KS2
- Union support for APP
- APP is recommended but not statutory
