= .app =

.app is an abbreviation of the word application. It may refer to:

== Filename extensions ==
- Used in GEM
- Used for application bundles in NeXTSTEP, OPENSTEP, GNUstep, macOS, iOS, and iPadOS
- Used for app packages in HarmonyOS

== Other uses ==
- .app (gTLD), a top-level internet domain

== See also ==
- App (disambiguation)
