= Formative assessment =

Method in education

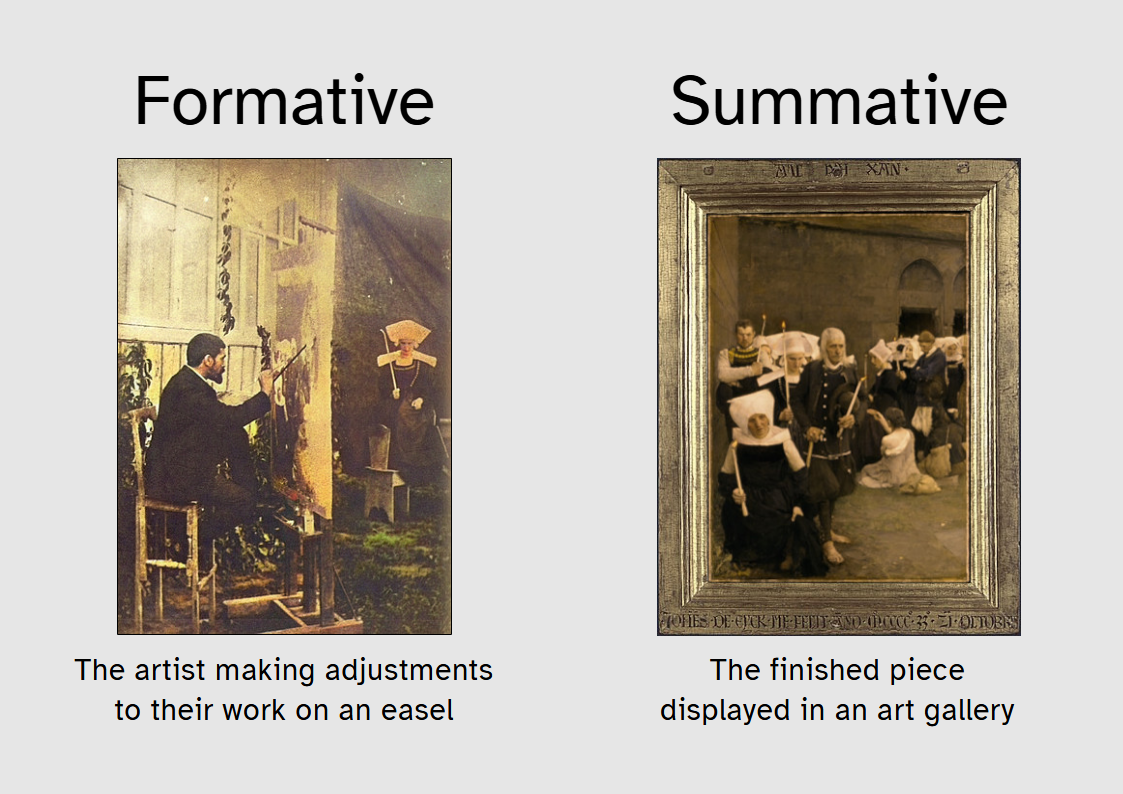
Formative vs summative assessments

Formative assessment, formative evaluation, formative feedback, or assessment for learning, including diagnostic testing, is a range of formal and informal assessment procedures conducted by teachers during the learning process in order to modify teaching and learning activities to improve student attainment. The goal of a formative assessment is to monitor student learning to provide ongoing feedback that can help students identify their strengths and weaknesses and target areas that need work. It also helps faculty recognize where students are struggling and address problems immediately. It typically involves qualitative feedback (rather than scores) for both student and teacher that focuses on the details of content and performance. It is commonly contrasted with summative assessment, which seeks to monitor educational outcomes, often for purposes of external accountability.

== Definition ==
Formative assessment involves a continuous way of checks and balances in the teaching learning processes. The method allows teachers to frequently check their learners' progress and the effectiveness of their own practice, thus allowing for self assessment of the student. Practice in a classroom is formative to the extent that evidence about student achievement is elicited, interpreted, and used by teachers, learners, or their peers, to make decisions about the next steps in instruction that are likely to be better, or better founded, than the decisions they would have taken in the absence of the evidence that was elicited.

Formative assessments give in-process feedback about what students are or are not learning so instructional approaches, teaching materials, and academic support can be modified to the students' needs. They are not graded, can be informal in nature, and they may take a variety of forms.

Formative assessments are generally low stakes, which means that they have low or no point value. Examples of formative assessments include asking students to draw a concept map in class to represent their understanding of a topic, submit one or two sentences identifying the main point of a lecture, or turn in a research proposal for early feedback.

== Origin of the term ==
Michael Scriven coined the terms formative and summative evaluation in 1967, and emphasized their differences both in terms of the goals of the information they seek and how the information is used. For Scriven, formative evaluation gathered information to assess the effectiveness of a curriculum and guide school system choices as to which curriculum to adopt and how to improve it. Benjamin Bloom took up the term in 1968 in the book Learning for Mastery to consider formative assessment as a tool for improving the teaching-learning process for students. His subsequent 1971 book Handbook of Formative and Summative Evaluation, written with Thomas Hasting and George Madaus, showed how formative assessments could be linked to instructional units in a variety of content areas. It is this approach that reflects the generally accepted meaning of the term today.

For both Scriven and Bloom, an assessment, whatever its other uses, is only formative if it is used to alter subsequent educational decisions. Subsequently, however, Paul Black and Dylan Wiliam suggested this definition is too restrictive, since formative assessments may be used to provide evidence that the intended course of action was indeed appropriate. They propose that practice in a classroom is formative to the extent that evidence about student achievement is elicited, interpreted, and used by teachers, learners, or their peers, to make decisions about the next steps in instruction that are likely to be better, or better founded, than the decisions they would have taken in the absence of the evidence that was elicited.

== Versus summative assessment ==
The type of assessment that people may be more familiar with is summative assessment. The table below shows some basic differences between the two types of assessment.

	Summative assessment	Formative assessment
When	At the end of a learning activity	During a learning activity
Goal	To make a decision	To improve learning
Feedback	Final judgement	Return to material
Frame of reference	Sometimes normative (comparing each student against all others); sometimes criterion	Always criterion (evaluating students according to the same criteria)

== Principles ==
Among the most comprehensive listing of principles of assessment for learning are those written by the QCA (Qualifications and Curriculum Authority). The authority, which is sponsored by England's Department for Children, Schools and Families, is responsible for national curriculum, assessment, and examinations. Their principal focus is on crucial aspects of assessment for learning, including how such assessment should be seen as central to classroom practice, and that all teachers should regard assessment for learning as a key professional skill.

The UK Assessment Reform Group (1999) identifies "The big 5 principles of assessment for learning":

1. The provision of effective feedback to students.
2. The active involvement of students in their own learning.
3. Adjusting teaching to take account of the results of the assessment.
4. Recognition of the profound influence assessment has on the motivation and self-esteem of pupils, both of which are critical influences on learning.
5. The need for students to be able to assess themselves and understand how to improve.

In the United States, the Assessment For Learning Project has identified four "core shifts" and ten "emerging principles" of assessment for learning:

Core shifts

1. Purpose of Assessment: From exposing inequity to enacting equity
2. Process of Assessment: From an isolated event to an integrated process
3. Priorities of Assessment: From evaluating students to encouraging reflection and feedback
4. Product of Assessment: From averages and scores to bodies of evidence of learning

Emerging principles

1. Meaningful Tasks, Worthy Evidence, and Authentic Validation
2. Coherence Among Curriculum, Instruction, and Assessment
3. Clear and Transparent Learning Targets
4. Accessible and Inclusive Design for All Learners
5. Active Student Participation with Structured Reflection
6. Specific, Actionable Feedback
7. Support of Positive Mindsets and Identities
8. Community-engaged Readiness Definitions
9. Professional Expertise, Collaboration, and Calibration
10. Systems of Assessments Designed from the Student Out

== Rationale and practice ==
Formative assessment serves several purposes:

- to provide feedback for teachers to modify subsequent learning activities and experiences;
- to identify and remediate group or individual deficiencies;
- to move focus away from achieving grades and onto learning processes, in order to increase self efficacy and reduce the negative impact of extrinsic motivation;
- to improve students' metacognitive awareness of how they learn.
- "frequent, ongoing assessment allows both for fine-tuning of instruction and student focus on progress."

Characteristics of formative assessment:

According to Harlen & James (1997), formative assessment:

- is essentially positive in intent, in that it is directed towards promoting learning; it is therefore part of teaching;
- it takes into account the progress of each individual, the effort put in and other aspects of learning which may be unspecified in the curriculum; in other words, it is not purely criterion-referenced;
- it has to take into account several instances in which certain skills and ideas are used and there will be inconsistencies as well as patterns in behavior; such inconsistencies would be 'error' in summative evaluation, but in formative evaluation they provide diagnostic information;
- validity and usefulness are paramount in formative assessment and should take precedence over concerns for reliability;
- even more than assessment for other purposes, formative assessment requires that pupils have a central part in it; pupils have to be active in their own learning (teachers cannot learn for them) and unless they come to understand their strengths and weaknesses, and how they might deal with them, they will not make progress.

Feedback is the central function of formative assessment. It typically involves a focus on the detailed content of what is being learnt, rather than simply a test score or other measurement of how far a student is falling short of the expected standard.

== Examples ==
The time between formative assessment and adjustments to learning can be a matter of seconds or a matter of months. Some examples of formative assessment are:

- Students are asked to self-assess their own learning products with the support of a list with criteria, thereby generating feedback for their own learning process. This has been found to improve learning in the field of science education when students are asked to self-assess their own conceptions of a scientific topic.
- A language teacher asks students to choose the best thesis statement from a selection; if all choose correctly she moves on; if only some do she may initiate a class discussion; if most answer incorrectly then she may review the work on thesis statements.
- A teacher asks her students to write down, in a brainstorm activity, all they know about how hot-air balloons work so that she can discover what students already know about the area of science she is intending to teach.
- A science supervisor looks at the previous year's student test results to help plan teacher workshops during the summer vacation, to address areas of weakness in student performance.
- A teacher documents student work and student conferences to help plan authentic activities to meet student needs
- Students could be given each one of three "traffic cards" to indicate the level at which they are understanding a concept during a lesson. Green means that the student is understanding the concept and the teacher can move on, yellow indicates that the instructor should slow down because the student is only somewhat understanding the concept, and red indicates that the student wishes that the teacher stops and explains a specific concept more clearly because they are not understanding it.
- As students are leaving class, the teacher asks them to answer the following question and submit it with their name to exit the class: "Name one important thing you learned in class today." This helps students synthesize what they had done that day and provides feedback to the teacher about the class.
- A teacher asks students to draw a concept map in class to represent their understanding of a topic.
- A teacher asks students to submit one or two sentences identifying the main point of a lecture.
- A teacher asks students to turn in a research proposal for early feedback.
- Lesson exit ticket to summarize what students have learned.
- A teacher uses an entry ticket to start class off with a quick question for students to answer about the previous day's lesson.
- A teacher asks students to draw a sketch to visually represent new knowledge.

== Evidence ==
Meta-analysis of studies into formative assessment have indicated significant learning gains where formative assessment is used, across all content areas, knowledge and skill types, and levels of education. Educational researcher Robert J. Marzano states:

Recall the finding from Black and Wiliam's (1998) synthesis of more than 250 studies that formative assessments, as opposed to summative ones, produce the more powerful effect on student learning. In his review of the research, Terrance Crooks (1988) reports that effects sizes for summative assessments are consistently lower than effect sizes for formative assessments. In short, it is formative assessment that has a strong research base supporting its impact on learning.

While empirical evidence has shown the substantial impact formative assessment has in raising student achievement, it is also "recognized as one of the most powerful ways to enhance student motivation". Believing in their ability to learn, contributing learning successes to individual efforts and abilities, emphasizing progress toward learning goals rather than letter grades, and evaluating "the nature of their thinking to identify strategies that improve understanding" are all manners in which motivation is enhanced through an effective use of formative assessment.

However, for these gains to become evident formative assessment must

1. clarify and share learning goals and success criteria;
2. create effective classroom discussions and other tasks which demonstrate evidence of student understanding;
3. provide feedback which can and will be acted upon;
4. allow students to become instructional resources for one another; and
5. stimulate students to become owners of their own learning.

Some researchers have concluded that standards-based assessments may be an effective way to "prescribe instruction and to ensure that no child is left behind".

In past decades, teachers would design a unit of study that would typically include objectives, teaching strategies, and resources. The student's mark on this test or exam was taken as the indicator of his or her understanding of the topic. In 1998, Black & Wiliam produced a review that highlighted that students who learn in a formative way achieve significantly better than matched control groups receiving normal teaching. Their work developed into several important research projects on Assessment for Learning by the King's College team including Kings-Medway-Oxfordshire Formative Assessment Project (KMOFAP), Assessment is For learning (Scotland), Jersey-Actioning-Formative assessment (Channel Islands), and smaller projects in England, Wales, Peru, and the USA.

The strongest evidence of improved learning gains comes from short-cycle (over seconds or minutes within a single lesson) formative assessment, and medium to long-term assessment where assessment is used to change the teacher's regular classroom practice.

== Strategies ==
=== Understanding goals for learning ===
It is important for students to understand the goals and the criteria for success when learning in the classroom. Often teachers will introduce learning goals to their students before a lesson, but will not do an effective job in distinguishing between the end goals and what the students will be doing to achieve those goals. "When teachers start from what it is they want students to know and design their instruction backward from that goal, then instruction is far more likely to be effective".

In a study done by Gray and Tall, they found that 72 students between the ages of 7 and 13 had different experiences when learning in mathematics. The study showed that higher achieving students looked over mathematical ambiguities, while the lower achieving students tended to get stuck on these misunderstandings. An example of this can be seen in the number $6\frac{1}{2}$. Although it is not explicitly stated, the operation between these two numbers is addition. If we look at the number $6x$, here the implied operation between $6$ and $x$ is multiplication. Finally if we take a look at the number $61$, there is a completely different operation between the 6 and 1. The study showed that higher achieving students were able to look past this while other students were not.

Another study done by White and Frederiksen showed that when twelve 7th grade science classrooms were given time to reflect on what they deemed to be quality work, and how they thought they would be evaluated on their work, the gap between the high achieving students and the low achieving students was decreased.

One way to help with this is to offer students different examples of other students' work so they can evaluate the different pieces. By examining the different levels of work, students can start to differentiate between superior and inferior work.

=== Feedback ===
There has been extensive research done on studying how students are affected by feedback. Kluger and DeNisi (1996) reviewed over three thousand reports on feedback in schools, universities, and the workplace. Of these, only 131 of them were found to be scientifically rigorous and of those, 50 of the studies shows that feedback actually has negative effects on its recipients. This is due to the fact that feedback is often "ego-involving", that is the feedback focuses on the individual student rather than the quality of the student's work. Feedback is often given in the form of some numerical or letter grade and that perpetuates students being compared to their peers. The studies previously mentioned showed that the most effective feedback for students is when they are not only told in which areas they need to improve, but also how to go about improving it.

It has been shown that leaving comments alongside grades is just as ineffective as giving solely a numerical/letter grade. This is due to the fact that students tend to look at their grade and disregard any comments that are given to them. The next thing students tend to do is to ask other students in the class for their grade, and they compare the grade to their own grade.

=== Questioning ===
Questioning is an important part of the learning process and an even more important part is asking the right types of questions. Questions should either cause the student to think, or collect information to inform teaching. Questions that promote discussion and student reflection make it easier for students to go on the right path to end up completing their learning goals. Here are some types of questions that are good to ask students:

- What do you think of [student]'s answer?
- What can we add to [student]'s explanation?
- [Student] said this and [student] said that, but how can we combine these explanations into a complete answer?

==== Wait time ====
Wait time is the amount of time that is given to a student to answer a question that was posed and the time allowed for the student to answer. Mary Budd Rowe went on to research the outcomes of having longer wait times for students. These included:

- answers were longer;
- failure to respond decreased;
- responses from students were more confident;
- students challenged and/or improved the answers of other students;
- more alternative explanations were offered.

== Peer-assessment ==
Having students assess each other's work has been studied to have numerous benefits:

- When students know that they are going to be assessed by their peers, they tend to put more attention to detail in their work.
- Students are able to speak to one another in a language that they are more comfortable with than they would be with an instructor. The insight of a fellow student might be more relatable than that of a teacher.
- Students tend to accept constructive criticism more from a fellow student than from an instructor.
- While students are in the process of peer-assessment, a teacher can more easily take command of the learning going on. The teacher can also stand on the sidelines and watch as the students continue to assess each other's work and may intervene at any time if need be.

== In K–12 ==
Formative assessment is valuable for day-to-day teaching when used to adapt instructional methods to meet students' needs and for monitoring student progress toward learning goals. Further, it helps students monitor their own progress as they get feedback from the teacher and/or peers, allowing the opportunity to revise and refine their thinking. Formative assessment is also known as educative assessment, classroom assessment, or assessment for learning.

=== Methods ===
There are many ways to integrate formative assessment into K–12 classrooms. Although the key concepts of formative assessment such as constant feedback, modifying the instruction, and information about students' progress do not vary among different disciplines or levels, the methods or strategies may differ. For example, researchers developed generative activities and model-eliciting activities that can be used as formative assessment tools in mathematics and science classrooms. Others developed strategies computer-supported collaborative learning environments. More information about implication of formative assessment in specific areas is given below.

=== Purpose ===
Formative assessment, or diagnostic testing as the National Board of Professional Teaching Standards argues, serves to create effective teaching curricula and classroom-specific evaluations. It involves gathering the best possible evidence about what students have learned, and then using that information to decide what to do next. By focusing on student-centered activities, a student is able to relate the material to his life and experiences. Students are encouraged to think critically and to develop analytical skills. This type of testing allows for a teacher's lesson plan to be clear, creative, and reflective of the curriculum.

Based on the Appalachian Education Laboratory (AEL), "diagnostic testing" emphasizes effective teaching practices while "considering learners' experiences and their unique conceptions". Furthermore, it provides the framework for "efficient retrieval and application" by urging students to take charge of their education. The implications of this type of testing, is developing a knowledgeable student with deep understanding of the information and then be able to account for a students' comprehension on a subject.

== Specific applications ==
The following are examples of application of formative assessment to content areas:

=== In math education ===
In math education, it is important for teachers to see how their students approach the problems and how much mathematical knowledge and at what level students use when solving the problems. That is, knowing how students think in the process of learning or problem solving makes it possible for teachers to help their students overcome conceptual difficulties and, in turn, improve learning. In that sense, formative assessment is diagnostic.

To employ formative assessment in the classrooms, a teacher has to make sure that each student participates in the learning process by expressing their ideas; there is a trustful environment in which students can provide each other with feedback; s/he (the teacher) provides students with feedback; and the instruction is modified according to students' needs. In math classes, thought revealing activities such as model-eliciting activities (MEAs) and generative activities provide good opportunities for covering these aspects of formative assessment.

==== Feedback examples ====
Here are some examples of possible feedback for students in math education:

- Student: "I just don't get it." Teacher: "Well, the first part is just like the last problem you did. Then we add one more variable. See if you can find out what it is, and I'll come back in a few minutes."
- "There are 5 answers here that are incorrect. Try to find them and fix them."
- "The answer to this question is... Can you find a way to work it out?"
- "You've used substitution to solve all of these systems of equations. Can you use elimination now to solve them?"

Different approaches for feedback encourage pupils to reflect:

- "You used two different methods to solve these problems. Can you explain the advantages and disadvantages of each method?"
- "You seem to have a good understanding of... Can you make up your own more difficult problem?"

Another method has students looking to each other to gain knowledge.

- "You seem to be confusing sine and cosine. Talk to Katie about the differences with the two."
- "Compare your work with Ali and write some advice to another student tackling this topic for the first time."

=== In second/foreign language education ===
As an ongoing assessment it focuses on the process, it helps teachers to check the current status of their students' language ability, that is, they can know what the students know and what the students do not know. It also gives chances to students to participate in modifying or planning the upcoming classes. Participation in their learning grows students' motivation to learn the target language. It also raises students' awareness on their target languages, which results in resetting their own goals. In consequence, it helps students to achieve their goals successfully as well as teachers be the facilitators to foster students' target language ability.

In classroom, short quizzes, inflectional journals, or portfolios could be used as a formative assessment.

=== In elementary education ===
In primary schools, it is used to inform the next steps of learning. Teachers and students both use formative assessments as a tool to make decisions based on data. Formative assessment occurs when teachers feed information back to students in ways that enable the student to learn better, or when students can engage in a similar, self-reflective process. The evidence shows that high quality formative assessment does have a powerful impact on student learning. Black & Wiliam (1998) report that studies of formative assessment show an effect size on standardized tests of between 0.4 and 0.7, larger than most known educational interventions. (The effect size is the ratio of the average improvement in test scores in the innovation to the range of scores of typical groups of pupils on the same tests; Black and Wiliam recognize that standardized tests are very limited measures of learning.)

Formative assessment is particularly effective for students who have not done well in school, thus narrowing the gap between low and high achievers while raising overall achievement. Research examined by Black and Wiliam supports the conclusion that summative assessments tend to have a negative effect on student learning.

=== Math and science ===
==== Model-eliciting activities (MEAs) ====
Model-eliciting activities are based on real-life situations where students, working in small groups, present a mathematical model as a solution to a client's need. The problem design enables students to evaluate their solutions according to the needs of a client identified in the problem situation and sustain themselves in productive, progressively effective cycles of conceptualizing and problem solving.

Model-eliciting activities (MEAs) are ideally structured to help students build their real-world sense of problem solving towards increasingly powerful mathematical constructs. What is especially useful for mathematics educators and researchers is the capacity of MEAs to make students' thinking visible through their models and modeling cycles. Teachers do not prompt the use of particular mathematical concepts or their representational counterparts when presenting the problems. Instead, they choose activities that maximize the potential for students to develop the concepts that are the focal point in the curriculum by building on their early and intuitive ideas. The mathematical models emerge from the students' interactions with the problem situation and learning is assessed via these emergent behaviors.

==== Generative activities ====
In a generative activity, students are asked to come up with outcomes that are mathematically same. Students can arrive at the responses or build responses from this sameness in a wide range of ways. The sameness gives coherence to the task and allows it to be an "organizational unit for performing a specific function."

Other activities can also be used as the means of formative assessment as long as they ensure the participation of every student, make students' thoughts visible to each other and to the teacher, promote feedback to revise and refine thinking. In addition, as a complementary to all of these is to modify and adapt instruction through the information gathered by those activities.

=== In computer-supported learning ===
Many academics are seeking to diversify assessment tasks, broaden the range of skills assessed and provide students with more timely and informative feedback on their progress. Others are wishing to meet student expectations for more flexible delivery and to generate efficiencies in assessment that can ease academic staff workloads. The move to on-line and computer based assessment is a natural outcome of the increasing use of information and communication technologies to enhance learning. As more students seek flexibility in their courses, it seems inevitable there will be growing expectations for flexible assessment as well. When implementing online and computer-based instruction, it is recommended that a structured framework or model be used to guide the assessment.

The way in which teachers orchestrate their classroom activities and lesson can be improved through the use of connected classroom technologies. With the use of technology, the formative assessment process not only allows for the rapid collection, analysis and exploitation of student data but also provides teachers with the data needed to inform their teaching.

== In UK education ==
In the UK education system, formative assessment (or assessment for learning) has been a key aspect of the agenda for personalized learning. The Working Group on 14–19 Reform led by Sir Mike Tomlinson, recommended that assessment of learners be refocused to be more teacher-led and less reliant on external assessment, putting learners at the heart of the assessment process.

The UK government has stated that personalized learning depends on teachers knowing the strengths and weaknesses of individual learners, and that a key means of achieving this is through formative assessment, involving high quality feedback to learners included within every teaching session.

The Assessment Reform Group has set out the following 10 principles for formative assessment.

Assessment for learning should:

- be part of effective planning of teaching and learning
- focus on how students learning attitude
- be recognized as central to classroom practice
- be regarded as a key professional skill for teachers
- be sensitive and constructive because any assessment has an emotional impact
- take account of the importance of learner motivation
- promote commitment to learning goals and a shared understanding of the criteria by which they are assessed
- enable learners to receive constructive guidance about how to improve
- develop learners' capacity for self-assessment so that they can become reflective and self-managing
- recognize the full range of achievements of all learners

== Complex assessment ==
A complex assessment is the one that requires a rubric and an expert examiner. Example items for complex assessment include thesis, funding proposal, etc. The complexity of assessment is due to the format implicitness. In the past, it has been puzzling to deal with the ambiguous assessment criteria for final year project (FYP) thesis assessment. Webster, Pepper and Jenkins (2000) discussed some common general criteria for FYP thesis and their ambiguity regarding use, meaning and application. Woolf (2004) more specifically stated on the FYP assessment criterion weighting:'The departments are as silent on the weightings that they apply to their criteria as they are on the number of criteria that contribute to a grade'. A more serious concern was raised by Shay (2004) who argued that the FYP assessment for engineering and social sciences is 'a socially situated interpretive act', implying that many different alternative interpretations and grades are possible for one assessment task. The problems with the FYP thesis assessment have thus received much attention over the decades since the assessment difficulty was discussed by Black (1975).

== Benefits for teachers ==
- Teachers are able to determine what standards students already know and to what degree.
- Teachers can decide what minor modifications or major changes in instruction they need to make so that all students can succeed in upcoming instruction and on subsequent assessments.
- Teachers can create appropriate lessons and activities for groups of learners or individual students.
- Teachers can inform students about their current progress in order to help them set goals for improvement.

== Benefits for students ==
- Students are more motivated to learn.
- Students take responsibility for their own learning.
- Students can become users of assessment alongside the teacher.
- Students learn valuable lifelong skills such as self-evaluation, self-assessment, and goal setting.
- Students become more adept at self-assessment

== Common formative assessments ==
The practice of common formative assessments is a way for teachers to use assessments to beneficially adjust their teaching pedagogy. The concept is that teachers who teach a common class can provide their classes with a common assessment. The results of that assessment could provide the teachers with valuable information, the most important being who on that teacher team is seeing the most success with his or her students on a given topic or standard. The purpose of this practice is to provide feedback for teachers, not necessarily students, so an assignment could be considered formative for teachers, but summative for students.

Researchers Kim Bailey and Chris Jakicic have stated that common formative assessments "promote efficiency for teachers, promote equity for students, provide an effective strategy for determining whether the guaranteed curriculum is being taught and, more importantly, learned, inform the practice of individual teachers, build a team's capacity to improve its program, facilitate a systematic, collective response to students who are experiencing difficulty, [and] offer the most powerful tool for changing adult behavior and practice."

Developing common formative assessments on a teacher team helps educators to address what Bailey and Jakicic lay out as the important questions to answer when reflecting on student progress. These include:

- What do we want students to know and do?
- How do we know they are learning?
- What do we do when they're not learning?
- How do we respond when they've already learned the information?

Common formative assessments are a way to address the second question. Teachers collects data on how students are doing to gain understanding and insight on whether students are learning, and how they are making sense of the lessons being taught. After gathering this data, teachers develop systems and plans to address the third and fourth questions and, over several years, modify the first question to fit the learning needs of their specific students.

When utilizing common formative assessments to collect data on student progress, teachers can compare their students' results. In tandem, they can also share the strategies they used in the classroom to teach that particular concept. With these things in mind, the teacher team can make some evaluations on what tasks and explanations seemed to produce the best student outcomes. Teachers who used alternate strategies now have new ideas for interventions and for when they teach the topic in upcoming years. Teacher teams can also use common formative assessments to review and calibrate their scoring practices. Teachers of a common class should aim to be as consistent as possible in evaluating their students. Comparing formative assessments, or having all teachers evaluate them together, is a way for teachers to adjust their grading criteria before the summative assessment. Through this practice, teachers are presented with an opportunity to grow professionally with the people who know them and understand their school environment.

To make the practice of teacher teams, common formative assessments, and power standards the most advantageous, the practice of backwards design should be utilized. Backwards design is the idea in education that the summative assessment should be developed first and that all formative work and lessons leading up to that specific assessment should be created second. Tomlinson and McTighe wrote, "Although not a new idea, we have found that the deliberate use of backwards design for planning courses, units, and individual lessons results in more clearly defined goals, more appropriate assessments, and more purposeful teaching." More specifically, intervention and re-teaching time must be factored into the schedule. It is unrealistic to think that every student will get every topic perfect and ready to take the summative assessment on a prescribed schedule.

Several models have been developed to refine or address specific issues in formative assessment. For example, Harry Torrance and John Pryor proposed a model that aims to provide a pattern and balance for assessment activities based on 14 categories. The classification allows for detailed analysis as well as guidance for practices being observed. While there are comprehensive models of formative assessment, there are also some frameworks that are specifically tailored to the subject being taught. This is demonstrated in a model that balances personal, social, and science development in science instruction and the framework that focuses on listening comprehension and speaking skills when assessing and instructing English language.

== See also ==
- Assessing Pupils' Progress
- Computer-aided assessment
- E-assessment
- Educational assessment
- International Development and Early Learning Assessment
- Problem set
- Types of assessment
