= Lesson =

Structured period of time where learning is intended to occur

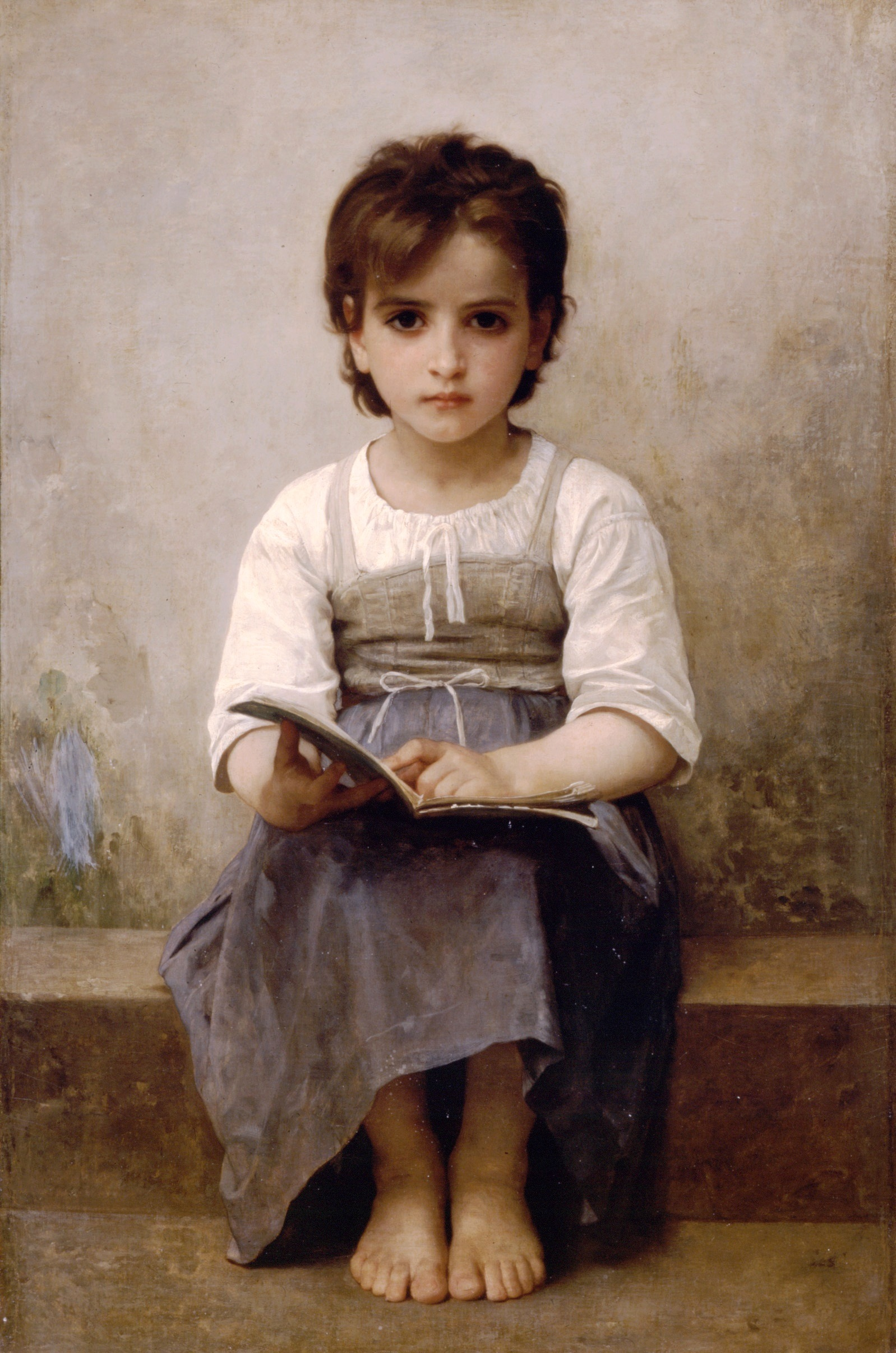
"The Difficult Lesson" by William-Adolphe Bouguereau (1884)

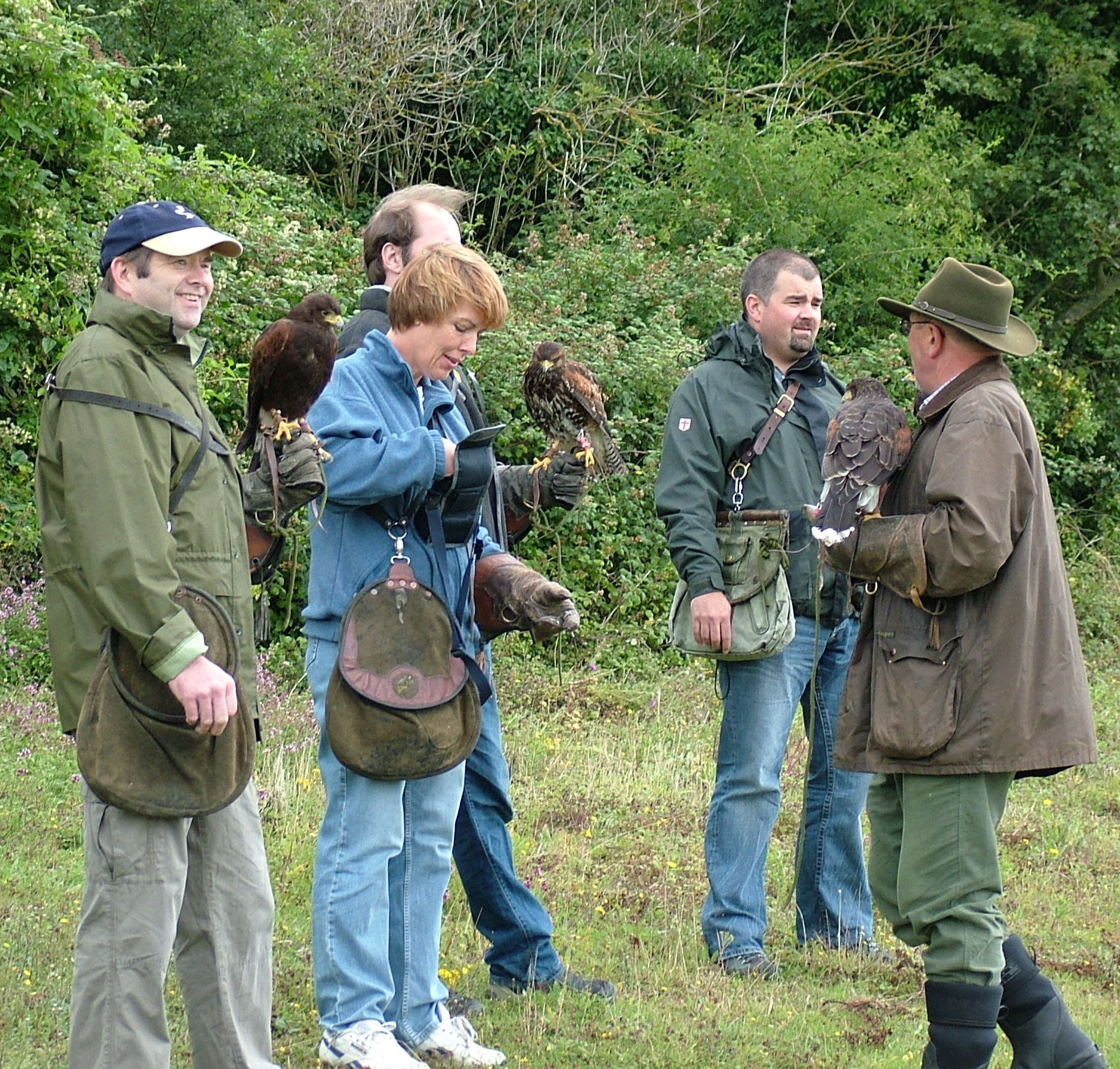
Falconry lesson

A lesson or class is a structured period of time where learning is intended to occur. It involves one or more students (also called pupils or learners in some circumstances) being taught by a teacher or instructor. Generally, a lesson is defined as "a piece of instruction; a reading or exercise to be studied by a pupil; or a division of a course of instruction."

A lesson may be either one section of a textbook (which, apart from the printed page, can also include multimedia) or, more frequently, a short period of time during which learners are taught about a particular subject or taught how to perform a particular activity. Lessons are generally taught in a classroom but may instead take place in a situated learning environment.

In a wider sense, a lesson is an insight gained by a learner into previously unfamiliar subject-matter. Such a lesson can be either planned or accidental, enjoyable or painful. The colloquial phrase "to teach someone a lesson", means to punish or scold a person for a mistake they have made in order to ensure that they do not make the same mistake again.

Lessons can also be made entertaining. When the term education is combined with entertainment, the term edutainment is coined.

== Types of lessons ==
The potential format and speaks to one or more people in the same room or space. This may be supplemented with gestures and tools. A lesson may range from a lecture, to a demonstration, to a discussion or a blend of some of these common presentation methods.

Some lessons may involve work by the student. Traditionally this might include reading and writing or creating something, perhaps when the instructor is not present. The student may work independently or collaborate with others.

In the Japanese educational system, lessons have been subject to "standardization", but since 2020 has become reformed. Education in the United States has traditionally been subject only to local control of lessons, but since Common Core was developed, lessons have become more "rigorous" and subject to "standards [that] emphasize literacy across the curriculum." Likewise, mathematics education has also become subject to changes in lesson study and planning.

More recent technologies have expanded the way a lesson can be delivered. For example: film strips, pre-recorded audio and video tapes, television programs and podcasts are some ways to deliver or add to a lesson. Crash Course has become an important lesson delivery tool for history and science education, featuring Hank Green, his brother John Green, and Sabrina Cruz.

Distance education techniques such as video conferencing, or electronic learning in a virtual learning environment have allowed interactive lessons to be presented to students who may not be in the same physical location. These tools offer new synchronous, asynchronous and blended ways to deliver lessons.

== Lesson plan ==
Teachers and instructors usually have a lesson plan which dictates the structure of the teaching. A group of lessons may be linked together in a unit plan, scheme, or work. The detail of the plan may vary with some being a simple list of what is going to be taught in a lesson with others working including much more detail, such as a time plan and the learning aims and objectives. Student teachers and beginning teachers are usually advised to put a great amount of detail into the written plan. This ensures that the plan will be cohesive, that all the components of a successful lesson are taken care of, and that one has a checklist to ensure that practicalities are taken care of (e.g., resources, scheduling, and classroom management considerations). Furthermore, beginning teachers are often advised to script some sections for themselves, such as questions they might ask the students in order to get a discussion going at the beginning of the lesson. The expectation is that the teachers can and should depart from the script when appropriate; improvisation is definitely encouraged and the fact of having written it out in advance ensures that an adequate amount of thought has been put into it ahead of time. Another reason for including a great amount of detail is that student teachers are often required to submit lesson plans in advance to their mentor teachers or professors in order to receive feedback on their ideas. When creating the lesson plan it is usual to look at the following:

- The aims (the broader goals of the lesson, what it is reaching towards)
- The objectives (the specific, measurable outcomes of the lesson – the particular skills or knowledge students should have acquired by its conclusion)
- The number of attendees and the student-teacher ratio
- The previous knowledge of the learners (which may or may not be the same for all) and how this will be activated at the start of the lesson
- The motivation of the learners (school students, for example, have no choice but to attend so the teacher must build some kind of motivation into the lesson)
- The time required for each section of teaching and learning
- The resources required and available
- Catering for the different needs (cultural differences, learning styles, special needs) of the individuals
- How the lesson is to be evaluated

== Etymology ==
The word lesson comes from Latin lectio "the action of reading (out)". From there, the word was also used for the text itself, very often a passage from the Bible read out during a religious service ("first lesson", "second lesson"). Finally, any portion of a book to be studied was referred to as a lesson.

== See also ==
- Age appropriateness – Expected behaviour of a person for their age
- Backward design – Educational design method
- Cognitive acceleration – Teaching approach to develop students' thinking abilities
- Course (education) – Program of study, or unit of teaching that typically lasts one education term
- Educational assessment – Educational evaluation method
- Learning by teaching – Method of teaching in which students teach the subject to each other
- Lesson plan – Description of the course of instruction for a lesson
- Life long learning – Ongoing, voluntary, and self-motivated pursuit of knowledge
- Music lesson – Type of formal instruction in music
- Sunday school – Religious educational institution
- Understanding by Design – Educational planning approach
- Zone of proximal development – Difference between what a learner can do without help and what they can do with help

== Bibliography ==
- Collet, Vicki (2019). Collaborative Lesson Study: Revisioning Teacher Professional Development. Teachers College Press. ISBN 9780807778067.
- Levin, Vanessa J. (2021). Teach Smarter: Literacy Strategies for Early Childhood Teachers. Wiley. ISBN 9781119698890.
