= Class (education) =

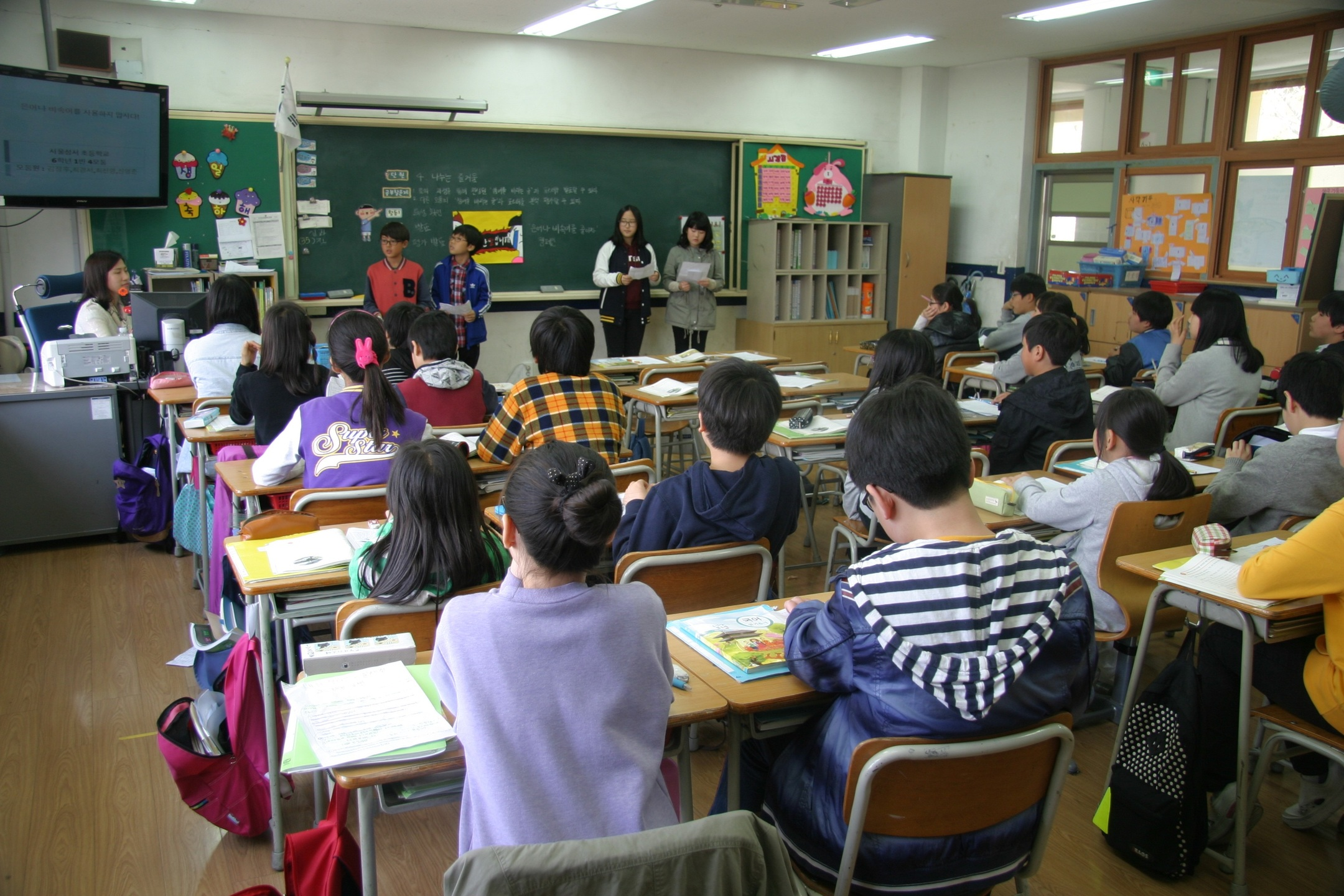
A class in Bali, Indonesia, in 2017

A class in education has a variety of related meanings.

It can be the group of students which attends a specific course or lesson at a university, school, or other educational institution, see Form (education).

It can refer to a course itself, for example, a class in Shakespearean drama.

It can be the group of students at the same level in an institution: the freshman class; or the group of students which matriculates to or graduates from the institution at the same time: the Class of 2005. The term can be used in a slightly more general context, such as "the graduating class." Some schools have class reunions, where members of a certain graduating class have the opportunity to meet again, and socialize with each other.

It can also refer to the classroom, in the building or venue where such a lesson is conducted.

In some countries' educational systems (such as Taiwan's), it can refer to a subdivision of the students in an academic department, consisting of a cohort of students of the same academic level. For example, a department's sophomores may be divided into three classes.

In countries such as the Republic of Ireland, India, Poland, Germany, Russia, and in the past, Sweden, the word can mean a grade: 1st class is ages 4–5, 2nd class is ages 6–7, 3rd class is ages 8–9, 4th class is ages 9–10, 5th class is ages 10–11, 6th class is ages 11–12, and 9th class is ages 14–15, class 10 is ages 15–16 and class 12th is ages 17–18.
