= Apps (surname) =

Apps is a surname. Notable people with the surname include:

- Apps family, a Canadian dynasty of ice hockey players:
  - Syl Apps (1915–1988), also a pole vaulter and former Ontario Cabinet Minister
  - Syl Apps Jr. (born 1947), son of Syl Apps
  - Syl Apps III (born 1976), son of Syl Apps Jr.
  - Gillian Apps (born 1983), daughter of Syl Apps Jr.
- Alfred Apps, (born 1957) Canadian lawyer and former President of the Liberal Party of Canada
  - Olivia Apps (born 1998), daughter of Alfred Apps and PWR, Canadian Women's 7s and 15s rugby player
- Deon Apps (born 1987), Australian rugby league player
- Kezie Apps (born 1991), Australian rugby league player
- Geoff Apps (1949–2024), English mountain bike pioneer
- Gordon Apps (1899–1931), British-born World War I flying ace
- Roy Apps (born 1951), British screenwriter, dramatist and children's author

== See also ==
- App (surname)
