= All People's Party =

The All People's Party may refer to:

- All People's Party (Assam)
- All People's Party (Bhutan)
- All People's Party (Ghana)
- All People's Party (Namibia)
- All People's Party (Nigeria)
- All People's Party (UK)
