= App (surname) =

App is a surname. Notable people with the surname include:

- Austin App (1902–1984), German-American academic and Holocaust denier
- Timothy App (1948–2025), American painter
- Urs App (born 1949), Swiss academic

== See also ==
- Apps (surname)
