= Lesson plan =

Description of the course of instruction for a lesson

A lesson plan is a teacher's detailed description of the course of instruction or "learning trajectory" for a lesson. A daily lesson plan is developed by a teacher to guide class learning. Details will vary depending on the preference of the teacher, subject being covered, and the needs of the students. There may be requirements mandated by the school system regarding the plan. A lesson plan is the teacher's guide for running a particular lesson, and it includes the goal (what the students are supposed to learn), how the goal will be reached (the method, procedure) and a way of measuring how well the goal was reached (test, worksheet, homework etc.).

== Main classes of symbiotic relationships ==
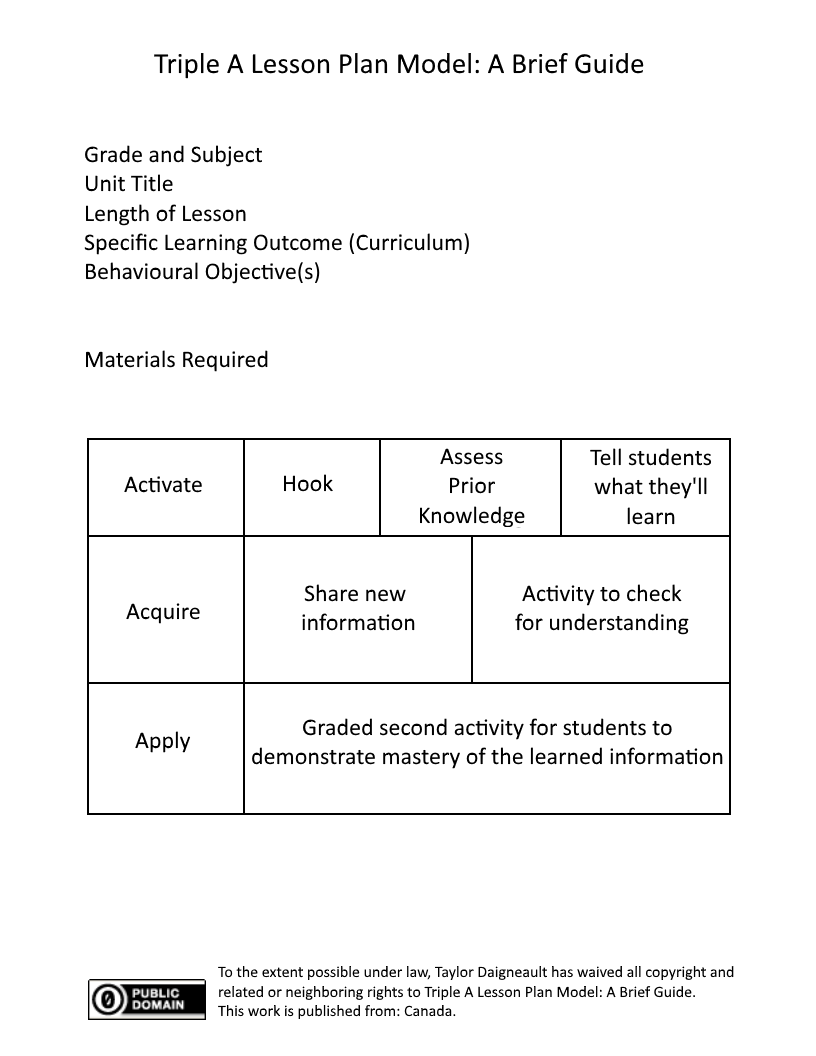
The "Triple A" model for planning arranges a lesson in a sequence of activating learning, acquiring new learning, and applying the learning.

While there are many formats for a lesson plan, most lesson plans contain some or all of these elements, typically in this order:

- Title of the lesson
- Time required to complete the lesson
- List of required materials
- List of objectives, which may be behavioral objectives (what the student can do at lesson completion) or knowledge objectives (what the student knows at lesson completion)
- The set (or lead-in, or bridge-in) that focuses students on the lesson's skills or concepts—these include showing pictures or models, asking leading questions, or reviewing previous lessons
- An instructional component that describes the sequence of events that make up the lesson, including the teacher's instructional input and, where appropriate, guided practice by students to consolidate new skills and ideas
- Independent practice that allows students to extend skills or knowledge on their own
- A summary, where the teacher wraps up the discussion and answers questions
- An evaluation component, a test for mastery of the instructed skills or concepts—such as a set of questions to answer or a set of instructions to follow
- A risk assessment where the lesson's risks and the steps taken to minimize them are documented
- An analysis component the teacher uses to reflect on the lesson itself—such as what worked and what needs improving
- A continuity component reviews and reflects on content from the previous lesson

=== Herbartian approach: Fredrick Herbart (1776-1841) ===
According to Herbart, there are eight lesson plan phases that are designed to provide "many opportunities for teachers to recognize and correct students' misconceptions while extending understanding for future lessons." These phases are: Introduction, Foundation, Brain Activation, Body of New Information, Clarification, Practice and Review, Independent Practice, and Closure.

1. Preparation/Instruction: It pertains to preparing and motivating children to the lesson content by linking it to the previous knowledge of the student, by arousing curiosity of the children and by making an appeal to their senses. This prepares the child's mind to receive new knowledge. "To know where the pupils are and where they should try to be are the two essentials of good teaching." Lessons may be started in the following manner: a. Two or three interesting but relevant questions b. Showing a picture/s, a chart or a model c. A situation Statement of Aim: Announcement of the focus of the lesson in a clear, concise statement such as "Today, we shall study the..."
2. Presentation/Development: The actual lesson commences here. This step should involve a good deal of activity on the part of the students. The teacher will take the aid of various devices, e.g., questions, illustrations, explanation, expositions, demonstration and sensory aids, etc. Information and knowledge can be given, explained, revealed or suggested. The following principles should be kept in mind. a. Principle of selection and division: This subject matter should be divided into different sections. The teacher should also decide as to how much he is to tell and how much the pupils are to find out for themselves. b. Principle of successive sequence: The teacher should ensure that the succeeding as well as preceding knowledge is clear to the students. c. Principle of absorption and integration: In the end separation of the parts must be followed by their combination to promote understanding of the whole.
3. Association comparison: It is always desirable that new ideas or knowledge be associated to daily life situations by citing suitable examples and by drawing comparisons with the related concepts. This step is important when we are establishing principles or generalizing definitions.
4. Generalizing: This concept is concerned with the systematizing of the knowledge learned. Comparison and contrast lead to generalization. An effort should be made to ensure that students draw the conclusions themselves. It should result in students' own thinking, reflection and experience.
5. Application: It requires a good deal of mental activity to think and apply the principles learned to new situations. Knowledge, when it is put to use and verified, becomes clear and a part of the student's mental make-up.
6. Recapitulation: Last step of the lesson plan, the teacher tries to ascertain whether the students have understood or grasped the subject matter or not. This is used for assessing/evaluating the effectiveness of the lesson by asking students questions on the contents of the lesson or by giving short objectives to test the student's level of understanding; for example, to label different parts on a diagram, etc.

=== Lesson plans and unit plans ===
A well-developed lesson plan reflects the interests and needs of students. It incorporates best practices for the educational field. The lesson plan correlates with the teacher's philosophy of education, which is what the teacher feels is the purpose of educating the students.

Secondary English program lesson plans, for example, usually center around four topics. They are literary theme, elements of language and composition, literary history, and literary genre. A broad, thematic lesson plan is preferable, because it allows a teacher to create various research, writing, speaking, and reading assignments. It helps an instructor teach different literature genres and incorporate videotapes, films, and television programs. Also, it facilitates teaching literature and English together. Similarly, history lesson plans focus on content (historical accuracy and background information), analytic thinking, scaffolding, and the practicality of lesson structure and meeting of educational goals. School requirements and a teacher's personal tastes, in that order, determine the exact requirements for a lesson plan.

Unit plans follow much the same format as a lesson plan, but cover an entire unit of work, which may span several days or weeks. Modern constructivist teaching styles may not require individual lesson plans. The unit plan may include specific objectives and timelines, but lesson plans can be more fluid as they adapt to student needs and learning styles.

Unit Planning is the proper selection of learning activities which presents a complete picture. Unit planning is a systematic arrangement of subject matter. "A unit plan is one which involves a series of learning experiences that are linked to achieve the aims composed by methodology and contents," (Samford). "A unit is an organization of various activities, experiences and types of learning around a central problem or purpose developed cooperatively by a group of pupils under a teacher leadership involving planning, execution of plans and evaluation of results," (Dictionary of Education).

Criteria of a Unit Plan

1. Needs, capabilities, interest of the learner should be considered.
2. Prepared on the sound psychological knowledge of the learner.
3. Provide a new learning experience; systematic but flexible.
4. Sustain the attention of the learner til the end.
5. Related to social and physical environment of the learner.
6. Development of learner's personality.

Lesson planning is a thinking process, not the filling in of a lesson plan template. A lesson plan is envisaged as a blue print, guide map for action, a comprehensive chart of classroom teaching-learning activities, an elastic but systematic approach for the teaching of concepts, skills and attitudes.

The first thing for setting a lesson plan is to create an objective, that is, a statement of purpose for the whole lesson. An objective statement itself should answer what students will be able to do by the end of the lesson. The objective drives the whole lesson plan; it is the reason the lesson plan exists. The teacher should ensure that lesson plan goals are compatible with the developmental level of the students. The teacher ensures as well that their student achievement expectations are reasonable.

=== Delivery of lesson plans ===
The following guidelines were set by Canadian Council on Learning to enhance the effectiveness of the teaching process:

- At the start of teaching, provide the students with an overall picture of the material to be presented. When presenting material, use as many visual aids as possible and a variety of familiar examples. Organize the material so that it is presented in a logical manner and in meaningful units. Try to use terms and concepts that are already familiar to the students.
- Maximize the similarity between the learning situation and the assessment situation and provide adequate training practice. Give students the chance to use their new skills immediately on their return home through assignments. Communicate the message about the importance of the lesson, increase their motivation level, and control sidelining behaviors by planning rewards for students who successfully complete and integrate the new content. To sustain learning performance, the assessments must be fair and attainable.
- Motivation affects teaching outcomes independently of any increase in cognitive ability. Learning motivation is affected by individual characteristics like conscientiousness and by the learning climate. Therefore, it is important to try to provide as much realistic assignments as possible. Students learn best at their own pace and when correct responses are immediately reinforced, perhaps with a quick “Well done.” For many Generation Z students, the use of technology can motivate learning. Simulations, games, virtual worlds, and online networking are already revolutionizing how students learn and how learning experiences are designed and delivered. Learners who are immersed in deep experiential learning in highly visual and interactive environments become intellectually engaged in the experience.
- Research shows that it is important to create a perceived need for learning (Why should I learn, the realistic relatable objective) in the minds of students. Then only students can perceive the transferred "how and what to learn" part from the educator. Also, provide ample information that will help to set the students' expectations about the events and consequences of actions that are likely to occur in the learning environment. For example, students learning to become adept on differential equations may face stressful situations, high loads of study, and a difficult environment. Studies suggest that the negative impact of such conditions can be reduced by letting students know ahead of time what might occur and equipping them with skills to manage.

==== Lesson plans and classroom management ====
Creating a reliable lesson plan is an important part of classroom management. Doing so requires the ability to incorporate effective strategies into the classroom, the students and overall environment. There are many different types of lesson plans and ways of creating them. Teachers can encourage critical thinking in a group setting by creating plans that include the students participating collectively. Visual strategies are another component tied into lesson plans that help with classroom management. These visual strategies help a wide variety of students to increase their learning structure and possibly their overall comprehension of the material or what is in the lesson plan itself. These strategies also give students with disabilities the option to learn in a possible more efficient way. Teachers need to realize the wide range of strategies that can be used to maintain classroom management and students. They should find the best strategies to incorporate in their lesson planning for their specific grade, student type, teaching style, etc. and utilize them to their advantage. The classroom tends to flow better when the teacher has a proper lesson planned, as it provides structure for the students. Being able to utilize class time efficiently comes with creating lesson plans at their core.

==== Assignments ====
Assignments are either in-class or take-home tasks to be completed for the next class period. These tasks are important because they help ensure that the instruction provides the students with a goal, the power to get there, and the interest to be engaged in rigorous academic contexts as they acquire content and skills necessary to be able to participate in academic coursework.

Experts cite that, in order to be effective and achieve objectives, the development of these assignment tasks must take into consideration the perceptions of the students because they are different from those of the teacher's. This challenge can be addressed by providing examples instead of abstract concepts or instructions. Another strategy involves the development of tasks that are specifically related to the learners' needs, interests, and age ranges. There are also experts who cite the importance of teaching learners about assignment planning. This is said to facilitate the students' engagement and interest in their assignment. Some strategies include brainstorming about the assignment process and the creation of a learning environment wherein students feel engaged and willing to reflect on their prior learning and to discuss specific or new topics.

There are several assignment types so the instructor must decide whether class assignments are whole-class, small groups, workshops, independent work, peer learning, or contractual:

- Whole-class—the teacher lectures to the class as a whole and has the class collectively participate in classroom discussions.
- Small groups—students work on assignments in groups of three or four.
- Workshops—students perform various tasks simultaneously. Workshop activities must be tailored to the lesson plan.
- Independent work—students complete assignments individually.
- Peer learning—students work together, face to face, so they can learn from one another.
- Contractual work—teacher and student establish an agreement that the student must perform a certain amount of work by a deadline.

These assignment categories (e.g. peer learning, independent, small groups) can also be used to guide the instructor's choice of assessment measures that can provide information about student and class comprehension of the material. As discussed by Biggs (1999), there are additional questions an instructor can consider when choosing which type of assignment would provide the most benefit to students. These include:

- What level of learning do the students need to attain before choosing assignments with varying difficulty levels?
- What is the amount of time the instructor wants the students to use to complete the assignment?
- How much time and effort does the instructor have to provide student grading and feedback?
- What is the purpose of the assignment? (e.g. to track student learning; to provide students with time to practice concepts; to practice incidental skills such as group process or independent research)
- How does the assignment fit with the rest of the lesson plan? Does the assignment test content knowledge or does it require application in a new context?
- Does the lesson plan fit a particular framework?

== See also ==
- Curriculum
- Syllabus
- Bloom's Taxonomy
- Instructional Materials
- No Child Left Behind
