= Adjusted Peak Performance =

Metric to measure computing performance in 64-bit processors and above

Adjusted Peak Performance (APP) is a metric introduced by the U.S. Department of Commerce's Bureau of Industry and Security (BIS) to more accurately predict the suitability of a computing system to complex computational problems, specifically those used in simulating nuclear weapons. This is used to determine the export limitations placed on certain computer systems under the Export Administration Regulations 15 CFR.

Further details can be found in the document "Practitioner's Guide To Adjusted Peak Performance".

The (simplified) algorithm used to calculate APP consists of the following steps:

- Determine how many 64 bit (or better) floating point operations every processor in the system can perform per clock cycle (best case). This is FPO(i).
- Determine the clock frequency of every processor. This is F(i).
- Choose the weighting factor for each processor: 0.9 for vector processors and 0.3 for non-vector processors. This is W(i).
- Calculate the APP for the system as follows: APP = FPO(1) * F(1) * W(1) + ... + FPO(n) * F(n) * W(n).

The metric was introduced in April 2006 to replace the Composite Theoretical Performance (CTP) metric which was introduced in 1993. APP was itself replaced in November 2007 when the BIS amended 15 CFR to include the December 2006 Wassenaar Arrangement Plenary Agreement Implementation's new metric - Gigaflops (GFLOPS), one billion floating point operations per second, or TeraFLOPS, one trillion floating point operations per second.

The unit of measurement is Weighted TeraFLOPS (WT) to specify Adjusted Peak Performance (APP).

The weighting factor is 0.3 for non-vector processors and 0.9 for vector processors. For example, a PowerPC 750 running at 800 MHz would be rated at 0.00024 WT due to being able to execute one floating point instruction per cycle and not having a vector unit. Note that only 64 bit (or wider) floating point instructions count.

Notes:

- Processors without 64 bit (or better) floating point support have an FPO of zero.
- The current APP limit is 0.75 WT.
