= Understanding by Design =

Educational planning approach

Understanding by Design, or UbD, is an educational theory for curriculum design of a school subject, where planners look at the desired outcomes at the end of the study in order to design curriculum units, performance assessments, and classroom instruction. UbD is an example of backward design, the practice of looking at the outcomes first, and focuses on teaching to achieve understanding. It is advocated by Jay McTighe and Grant Wiggins (1950–2015) in their Understanding by Design (1998), published by the Association for Supervision and Curriculum Development. Understanding by Design and UbD are registered trademarks of the Association for Supervision and Curriculum Development (ASCD).

== Backward design ==
Understanding by Design relies on what Wiggins and McTighe call "backward design" (also known as "backwards planning"). Teachers, according to UbD proponents, traditionally start curriculum planning with activities and textbooks instead of identifying classroom learning goals and planning towards that goal. In backward design, the teacher starts with classroom outcomes and then plans the curriculum, choosing activities and materials that help determine student ability and foster student learning.

The backward design approach has three stages. Stage 1 is identification of desired results for students. This may use content standards, common core or state standards. Stage 1 defines "Students will understand that..." and lists essential questions that will guide the learner to understanding. Stage 2 is assessing learning strategies. Stage 3 is listing the learning activities that will lead students to your desired results.

== Teaching for understanding ==
In their article on science education, Smith and Siegel argue "that education aims at the imparting of knowledge: students are educated in part so that they may come to know things". While a student can know a lot about a particular subject, teachers globally are beginning to push their students to go beyond simple recall. This is where understanding plays an important role. The goal of Teaching for Understanding is to give students the tools to take what they know, and what they will eventually know, and make a mindful connection between the ideas. In a world that is filled with data, teachers are only able to help students learn a small number of ideas and facts. As such, it is important that we give students the tools needed to decipher and understand the ideas. This transferability of skills is at the heart of McTighe and Wiggins' technique. If a student is able to transfer the skills they learn in the classroom to unfamiliar situations, whether academic or non-academic, they are said to truly understand.

Teaching for Understanding had been used as a framework for developing literacy education for TESOL students, see Pearson and Pellerine (2010)

== See also ==
- Educational theory
- Instructional design
