= Mary Budd Rowe =

American science educator and education researcher

- Born: 1925
- Died: 1996 (aged 70–71)
- Education: University of California, Berkeley; Stanford University
- Known for: Research on "wait time" in education, Science education advocacy
- Awards: Robert H. Carleton Award for National Leadership in Science Education (1981)
- Scientific career
- Fields: Science education, Education research
- Workplaces: National Science Foundation, Stanford University

Mary Budd Rowe (1925–1996) was an American science educator and education researcher, best known for her work on "wait time," which showed that when teachers wait longer for children to answer a question, learning and inference can dramatically improve. She headed the science education research division of the National Science Foundation, was an advisor to several influential educational television shows, and served on numerous national standards and review committees.

Rowe authored over 100 journal articles and several books.

== Early life and education ==
Born and raised in New Jersey, Rowe attributed her interest and approach to science education to an early encounter with Albert Einstein. On her middle school's annual visit to Princeton, she encountered the physicist gesturing and moving his hands rapidly, looking at a fountain. He asked Rowe, then in seventh grade, if she could stop the water long enough to see the shapes of the droplets. He then showed her how to wave her fingers to create a strobe effect and examine the shapes the water made. Rowe and Einstein experimented together for a few minutes to achieve the best effect. As Rowe would tell the story, as he left her he said "Never forget that science is just that kind of exploring and fun."

"Nearly half a century later," wrote Rowe in 1995, "I've spent an entire career trying to impart Einstein's words to adults and children all over the world: Science is exploring, and exploring is fun."

Rowe attended college in New Jersey, graduating with bachelor's degrees in biology and education in 1947. She earned a master's degree in zoology at the University of California, Berkeley in 1954. She earned a doctorate in science education from Stanford University in 1964.

== Research ==
=== Wait Time ===
In the early 1970s, Rowe published research newly describing a variable of teacher behavior, "wait time," to measure the amount of time a teacher waits for a student to start answering a question and the amount of time a teacher waits once the student stops speaking before continuing the lesson or asking another question. Rowe found that a number of student outcomes improved when teachers waited longer for students to answer.

Rowe collected hundreds of recordings of classroom talk, and fed the sound from the tapes into a mechanical plotter to allow her to measure the lengths of pauses in conversation. This work found that teachers were waiting an average of less than a second for the student to answer, or for the student to continue his or her answer after pausing.

When teachers were coached to wait longer, students use of language and logic improved, as did student and teacher attitudes and expectations. Students' answers increased in length by 300 to 700 percent, contained more inferences and speculative teaching, and shifted the classroom experience to more teacher and student exchanges — relying less on teacher show-and-tell. Moreover, the number of "I don't know" and non-responses decreased. Additional studies found consistent results in a variety of educational settings, from elementary to college-age students, and from special educational to gifted and talented classes.

Rowe and others' work also found that there was a significant threshold effect: when wait time increased to 2.7 seconds or longer, performance improved, smaller increases yielded significantly smaller benefits.

=== Praise and "fate control" ===
Rowe's classroom conversation studies also examined how teachers responded to student answers. Rose found that "sanctioning behavior"—either positive praise or negative feedback—discouraged the quality of student responses. Even when positive praise was consistently offered, student response became questioning ("the answer is five?"); in essence, Rowe found, praise led students to be more focused on discovering whether the teacher would approve than on discovering how the scientific phenomenon worked.

Rowe proposed that understanding science confers a sense of "fate control," giving the student confidence that they can control outcomes in the world, and that reliance on teacher praise eroded this sense of controlling one's own fate.

== Advocacy and education ==
As leader of the science education research division of the National Science Foundation from 1976 to 1980, and later in her career, Rowe advocated improved science education techniques across the United States and internationally. She served on several high-profile commissions, including the National Research Council Committee on Science Education Standards and Assessment.

In 1993–94, Rowe co-chaired the blue ribbon Federal Coordinating Council for Science, Engineering and Technology, which produced one of the most comprehensive federal reviews of science education programs. The panel recommended overhauling the approach to funding these programs, with far greater emphasis on assessing which programs were effective and coordinating across agencies. After the release of the report, Rowe said "We're in a competitive, almost life-death kind of struggle with other countries. And I don't think we can afford to invest big amounts in programs that don't work."

Rowe also brought her expertise in science education to a number of broader forums. She served as a science advisor to educational television shows, 3-2-1 Contact, Voyage of the Mimi, and Reading Rainbow.

== Impact ==
Rowe's research on wait time has had an lasting impact, influencing how science educators are trained for decades after first publication. Upon Rowe's death in 1996, Richard Shavelson, dean of the Stanford School of Education, lauded Rowe as "one of the giants in the field of science education and clearly looked upon as a leader."

== Works ==
Teaching science as continuous inquiry. New York, McGraw-Hill, 1978. ISBN 978-0-07-054116-0

The process of knowing, Washington, D.C., National Science Teachers Association, 1990. ISBN 978-0-87355-093-2.

What research says to the science teacher. Washington D.C., National Science Teachers Association, 1978 ISBN 0873550188.

Education in the 80's--science. Washington, D.C., National Education Association, 1982. ISBN 0810631628.

Teaching children about life and earth sciences : ideas and activities every teacher and parent can use. With Elaine Levenson and Debra L Ellinger. New York: TAB Books, 1994. ISBN 0070376557.

== Awards and appointments ==
President, National Science Teachers Association, 1987-88

Robert H. Carleton Award for National Leadership in Science Education, National Science Teachers Association, 1981
