= Summative assessment =

Assessment used to determine student outcomes after an academic course

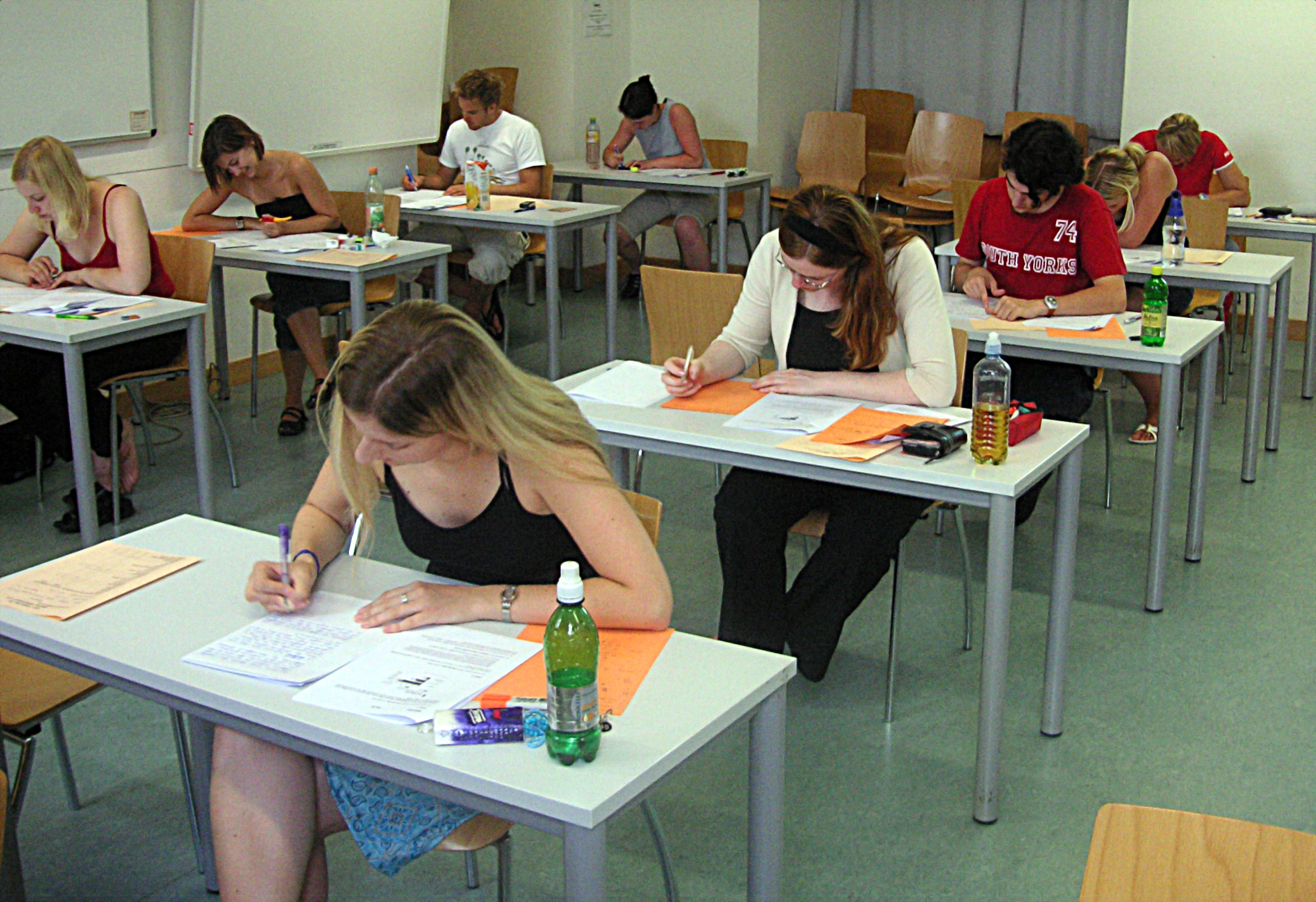
Students taking an assessment

Summative assessment, summative evaluation, or assessment of learning is the assessment of participants in an educational program. Summative assessments are designed both to assess the effectiveness of the program and the learning of the participants. This contrasts with formative assessment which summarizes the participants' development at a particular time to inform instructors of student learning progress.

The goal of summative assessment is to evaluate student learning at the end of an instructional unit by comparing it against a standard or benchmark. Summative assessments may be distributed throughout a course or often after a particular unit (or collection of topics) . Summative assessment usually involves students receiving a grade that indicates their level of performance. Grading systems can include a percentage, pass/fail, or some other form of scale grade. Summative assessments are weighed more than formative assessments.

Summative assessments are often high stakes, which means that they have a high point value. Examples of summative assessments include: a midterm exam, a final project, a paper, a senior recital, or another format.

== Instructional design ==
Summative assessment is used as an evaluation technique in instructional design. It can provide information on the efficacy of an educational unit of study. Summative evaluation judges the worth or value of an educational unit of study at its conclusion. Summative assessments also serve the purpose of evaluating student learning. In schools, these assessments varies: traditional written tests, essays, presentations, discussions, or reports using other formats. There are several factors which designers of summative assessments must take into consideration. Firstly, a summative assessment must have validity I.e., it must evaluate the standards or learning objectives that were taught over the course of the unit. Secondly, a summative assessment must be reliable: the results of the assessment should be consistent. In other words, the assessment should be designed to be as objective as possible, though this can be challenging in certain disciplines.

Summative assessments are usually given at the end of a unit and they are usually high stakes with the grade being weighed more heavily than formative assessments taken during the unit. Many educators and school administrators use data from summative assessments to help identify learning gaps. This information can come from both summative assessments taken in the classroom or from district-wide, school-wide or statewide standardized tests. Once educators and administrators have student summative assessment data, many districts place students into educational interventions or enrichment programs. Intervention programs are designed to teach students skills in which they are not yet proficient in order to help them make progress and lessen learning gaps while enrichment programs are designed to challenge students who have mastered many skills and have high summative assessment scores.

== Educator performance ==
Summative assessment can be used to refer to assessment of educational faculty by their respective supervisor with the aim of measuring all teachers on the same criteria to determine the level of their performance. In this context, summative assessment is meant to meet the school or district's needs for teachers' accountability. The evaluation usually takes the shape of a form and consists of check lists and occasionally narratives. Areas evaluated include classroom climate, instruction, professionalism, planning and preparation.

== Methods ==
Methods of summative assessment aim to summarize overall learning at the completion of the course or unit.

- Questionnaires
- Surveys
- Interviews
- Observations
- Testing (specific test created by the teacher or establishment made to include all points of a unit or specific information taught in a given time frame)
- Projects (a culminating project that synthesizes knowledge)

== See also ==
- Examination
- Educational assessment
- Formative assessment
- Computer-aided assessment
- Types of assessment
