= Training and development =

Improving the effectiveness of organizations and the individuals and teams within them

Training and development involves improving the effectiveness of organizations and the individuals and teams within them. Training may be viewed as being related to immediate changes in effectiveness via organized instruction, while development is related to the progress of longer-term organizational and employee goals. While training and development technically have differing definitions, the terms are often used interchangeably. Training and development have historically been topics within adult education and applied psychology, but have within the last two decades become closely associated with human resources management, talent management, human resources development, instructional design, human factors, and knowledge management.

Skills training has taken on varying organizational forms across industrialized economies. Germany has an elaborate vocational training system, whereas the United States and the United Kingdom are considered to generally have weak ones.

== History ==
Aspects of training and development have been linked to ancient civilizations around the world. Early training-related articles appeared in journals marketed to enslavers in the Antebellum South and training approaches and philosophies were discussed extensively by Booker T. Washington. Early academic publishing related to training included a 1918 article in the Journal of Applied Psychology, which explored an undergraduate curriculum designed for applied psychologists.

By the 1960s and 70s, the field began developing theories and conducting theory-based research since it was historically rooted in trial-and-error intervention research, and new training methods were developed, such as the use of computers, television, case studies, and role playing. The scope of training and development also expanded to include cross-cultural training, a focus on the development of the individual employee, and the use of new organization development literature to frame training programs.

The 1980s focused on how employees received and implemented training programs, and encouraged the collection of data for evaluation purposes, particularly management training programs. The development piece of training and development became increasingly popular in the 90s, with employees more frequently being influenced by the concept of lifelong learning. It was in this decade that research revealing the impact and importance of fostering a training and development-positive culture was first conducted.

The 21st century brought more research in topics such as team-training, such as cross-training, which emphasizes training in coworkers' responsibilities.

== Training practice and methods ==
Training and development encompasses three main activities: training, education, and development. Differing levels and types of development may be used depending on the roles of employees in an organisation.

The "stakeholders" in training and development are categorized into several classes. The sponsors of training and development are senior managers, while line managers are responsible for coaching, providing resources, and managing performance. The clients of training and development are business planners, while the participants are those who undergo the processes. The facilitators are human resource management staff, and the providers are specialists in the field. Each of these groups has its own agenda and motivations, which sometimes conflict with those of others.

Since the 2000s, training has become more trainee-focused, which allows those being trained more flexibility and active learning opportunities. These active learning techniques include exploratory/discovery learning, error management training, guided exploration, and mastery training. Typical projects in the field include executive and supervisory/management development, new employee orientation, professional skills training, technical/job training, customer-service training, sales-and-marketing training, and health-and-safety training. Training is particularly critical in high-reliability organizations, which rely on high safety standards to prevent catastrophic damage to employees, equipment, or the environment (e.g., nuclear power plants and operating rooms).

The instructional systems design approach (often referred to as the ADDIE model) is often used for designing learning programs and used for instructional design, or the process of designing, developing, and delivering learning content. There are 5 phases in the ADDIE model:

1. Needs assessment: problem identification. training needs analysis, determination of audience determined, identification of stakeholder's needs and required resources
2. Program design: mapping of learning intervention/implementation outline and evaluation methods
3. Program development: delivery method, production of learning outcomes, quality evaluation of learning outcome, development of communication strategy, required technology, and assessment and evaluation tools
4. Training delivery and implementation: participation in side-programs, training delivery, learning participation, and evaluation of business
5. Evaluation of training: formal evaluation, including the evaluation of learning and potential points of improvement

Many different training methods exist today, including both on- and off-the-job methods. Other training methods may include:

- Apprenticeship training: training in which a worker entering the skilled trades is given thorough instruction and experience both on and off the job in the practical and theoretical aspects of the work
- Co-operative programs and internship programs: training programs that combine practical, on-the-job experience with formal education, and are usually offered at colleges and universities
- Classroom instruction: information is presented in lectures, demonstrations, films, and videotapes or through computer instruction
- Self-directed learning: individuals work at their own pace during programmed instruction, which may include books, manuals, or computers that break down subject-matter content into highly organized logical sequences that demand a continuous response on the trainee's part. It often includes the use of a computer and online resources.
- Audiovisual: methods used to teach the skills and procedures required for a number of jobs through audiovisual means
- Simulation: used when it is not practical or safe to train people on the actual equipment or within the actual work environment

There is significant importance in training as it prepares employees for higher job responsibilities, shows employees they are valued, improves IT and computer processes, and tests the efficiency of new performance management systems. However, some believe training wastes time and money because, in certain cases, real life experience may be better than education, and organizations want to spend less, not more.

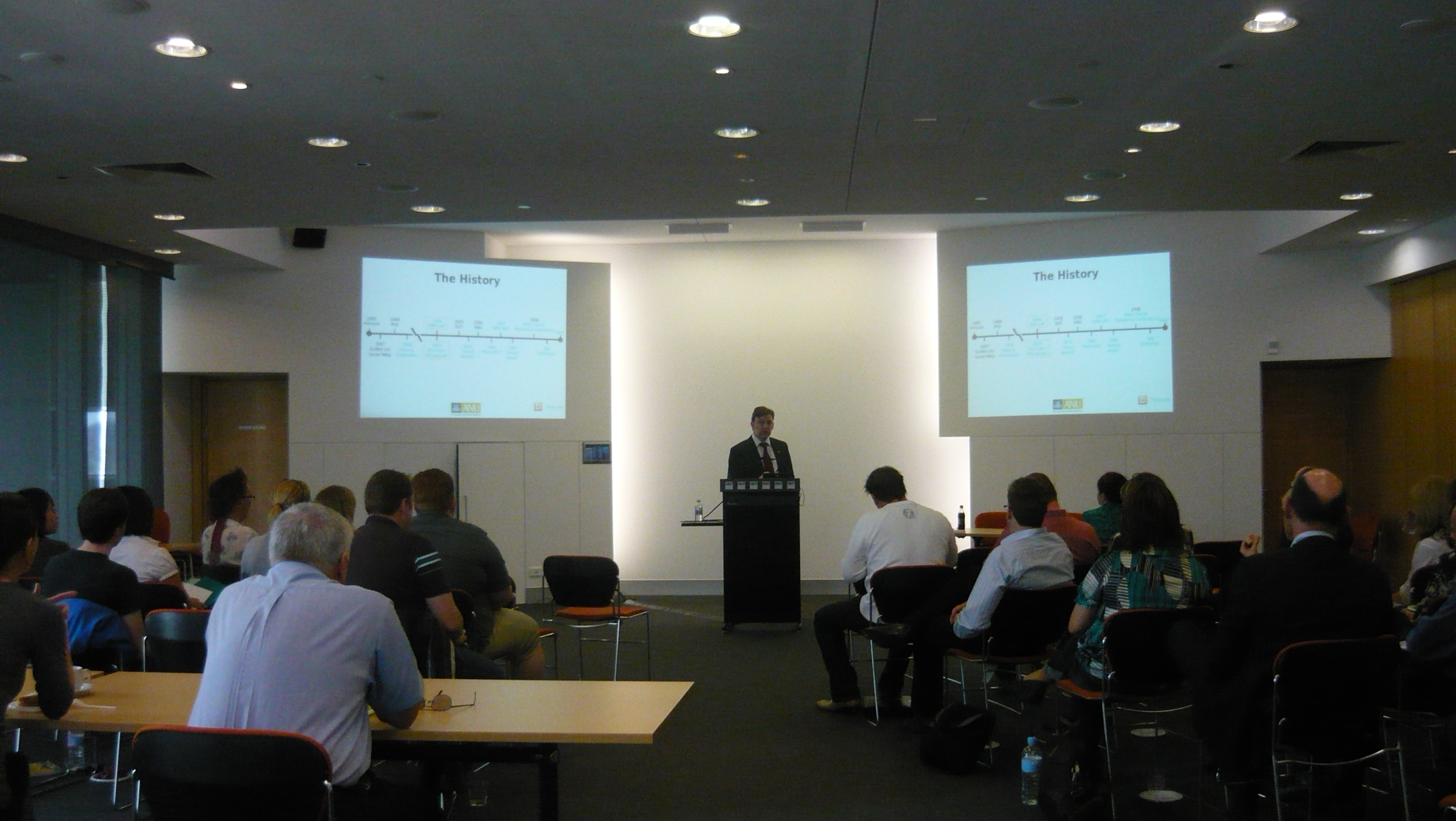
Seminar training method

In the 1940s, Professor Reginald Revans introduced action learning development model, whereby training managers bring together organizational teams to improve organizational performance. According to Revans, the learning formula is: Learning (L) = Traditional Training Program (P) + Questioning (Q) to create development insights. In addition to traditional training methods (P), organizational questioning (Q) enables each employee to reflect on past experiences, the write down new insights to guide future actions to improve on the job performance and collective organizational performance. Action-learning based training models have become popular among many training managers and chief learning officers (CLOs).

Training effectiveness can be enhanced by using digital tools and platforms that streamline task management, monitor progress, and provide feedback to both employees and managers. Modern software solutions help organizations align training programs with performance objectives, track learning outcomes, and identify areas for improvement.

== Training in the Public Sector ==
Training and development in the public sector are essential for cultivating a competent, motivated, and ethically grounded workforce. These initiatives support skill acquisition, reinforce public service values, and enhance employee engagement. Research has examined how developmental interventions influence Public Service Motivation (PSM), facilitating training transfer, and improve work engagement across various public organizations.

=== Public Service Motivation (PSM) and Training ===
PSM refers to prosocial and altruistic values that drive individuals to serve the public interest. It is a key predictor of job satisfaction, performance, and ethical behavior among public employees. In competitive civil service systems, recruitment may attract candidates motivated by extrinsic rewards, potentially crowding out intrinsic public service values, a phenomenon known as adverse selection.

A study by Chen, Hsieh, and Chen (2019) evaluated a five-week onboarding program for new civil servants in Taiwan. The training led to statistically significant improvements in public service-related knowledge and attitudes, including a stronger perception of public service as a means to help others and contribute positively to society. However, PSM itself showed minimal short-term change, suggesting that deeply held values are less responsive to brief interventions. The study found that perceived usefulness of training was strongly associated with attitude change and, in some cases, modest increases in PSM. A positive attitude toward public service work mediated the relationship between training usefulness and PSM, indicating that training can indirectly influence motivation by shaping how employees perceive their roles.

==== Training Transfer and Implementation ====
Beyond initial learning, public sector organizations often face challenges in ensuring that acquired skills are applied in the workplace. Quratulain et al. (2019) examined factors influencing training implementation among public employees in Pakistan, using Social Cognitive Theory. The study identified two key predictors: self-efficacy beliefs (confidence in one's ability to apply learned skills) and training instrumentality beliefs (perception that training leads to tangible rewards or career advancement). Organizational climate moderated these relationships. A flexible work environment enhanced the impact of self-efficacy on implementation, while performance feedback strengthened the effect of instrumentality beliefs. These findings highlight the importance of supportive conditions in promoting training transfer.

===== Training Access and Work Engagement =====
Access to training opportunities is also linked to employee engagement. Hassett (2022) studied the U.S. federal workforce and found that perceived access to training was positively correlated with higher levels of work engagement. Employees with access to development opportunities had engagement scores approximately 15 percentage points higher than those without. The study applied High-Performance Work Systems (HPWS) and Job Demands-Resources (JD-R) theory to explain how training serves as a resource that buffers job demands and enhances motivation.

Yu and Lee (2021) added a gender equity lens, showing that mentorship improves reporting of discrimination and career development among women in public organizations.

====== Meta Analytic and Evidence on Training Effectiveness ======
A rapid evidence review commissioned by the UK government found that management training programs are generally effective at improving organizational outcomes, with evidence favoring facilitated and context-adapted training. The review noted that most evidence comes from private-sector contexts and that civil-service training requires local evaluation. Another meta-analysis by the Inter-American Development Bank synthesized over 400 estimates and concluded that managerial training programs have positive average effects on firm productivity, management practices, and firm survival, particularly when tailored to specific sectors and delivered by local organizations.

====== Implications for public sector ======
These findings offer practical guidance for public sector human resource management:

- Strategic Training Design: Programs should be perceived as relevant and impactful to foster positive attitudes and indirectly support PSM.
- Supportive Climate: Flexible environments and robust feedback systems promote training transfer.
- Linking Training to Rewards: Clear connections between training and career outcomes enhance motivation and implementation.
- Equitable Access: Providing widespread access to training opportunities improves engagement and reduces disparities.
- Long-Term Development: Sustained interventions are necessary to cultivate intrinsic public service values beyond initial training.

Training and development in the public sector are not only tools for skill enhancement but also mechanisms for reinforcing public service values and improving organizational effectiveness.

Public sector training and career development opportunities for women

Although there have been efforts from federal agencies to encourage employees to denounce discriminatory behaviour and display anti-discrimination legislation, research demonstrates that women opt to avoid making a formal report. Studies illustrate that women in law enforcement experience sexual harassment as a form of discriminatory behaviour, which includes asking for intimate acts, verbal and physical misconduct, impacting women's employment around work performance, and creating an unsafe environment.

Relationship between mentorship and workplace discrimination

Mentorship is one of the factors that influences the reporting of workplace discrimination among women. Considering that mentors must comply with employment rules relating to sexual abuse, mentors should encourage mentees to denounce discrimination and retaliation. The ‘No Fear Act 2002’ motivates employees to report inappropriate behaviour. In addition, the Federal Government demands annual training for agencies to inform workers of the prohibition of discriminatory behaviours and retaliation.

It is essential to have policies regarding discriminatory employment because women in male-dominated fields are not willing to report discrimination, worried about revenge or frustrated about not seeing results from past cases. Therefore, it is confirmed that women who have opposite gender mentors disclose discrimination. Occupations like law enforcement posit an aggressive, masculine culture that suppresses female officers, and women who speak out against this structure are at risk of losing training and promotion opportunities.

The initiative by the United Nations (2014), ‘HeForShe’, creates awareness about gender inequity and invites men to solidarise with women and cultivate change among communities to achieve a more equal workplace. Additionally, ‘MeToo’ and ‘Time’s Up’ campaigns motivate women to tell personal stories around sexual harassment, promoting change and creating awareness. Overall, it is suggested that public organisations designate female mentors from external companies. In the event of fiscal constraints, public sector agencies must expand the requirements of the ‘No Fear Act of 2002’ and establish an anti-discrimination training programme to address the situation.

The token status factor prevents minorities’ career development

The status perspective of tokenism states that people belonging to low-ranking levels experience token negative effects, encountering barriers to rise to senior positions (glass ceiling). On the other hand, individuals who are part of higher categories and are involved in female-dominated fields experience positive token effects, such as rapid career advancement and promotion opportunities (glass escalator). Therefore, women in token positions face a climate of gender inequality that negatively affects their work commitments. The connection among token status, gender inequity, and work commitment impacts women's career aspirations.

Research shows that men pursue alpha career patterns (linear, career focus), in contrast, women seek a beta career pattern (aligned with family values, flexible and balanced). According to stereotype threat theory, women are likely to be judged based on negative stereotypes in relation to their skills and performance at their jobs. Hence, they experience impostor syndrome and tend to lower their career goals.

Gender and equal opportunities

In general, public sector organisations attract more female than male employees. Most of these companies perpetuate gender, which means they provide career, economic, training, and development opportunities primarily for men; hence, men hold control of resources and are the decision-makers. In gendered organisations, women feel the need to prove themselves to be taken seriously.

Incivility experienced by women and people of colour is known as ‘Modern discrimination’, which is subtler than more obvious offences like discrimination legislation or breaches of workplace policies. Talking condescendingly, not replying to emails, avoiding eye contact, or publicly embarrassing a woman are examples of incivility. Certain studies (e.g., Smith et al., 2021) confirm the existence of incivility towards women and women of colour, while others do not. In the US military, the rates of incivility towards African American women are high. Conversely, white women and non-Hispanic women face more incivility than Hispanic women in the public sector. The findings of Smith et al. (2021) suggest that Hispanic women report fewer harmful incidents because they develop strategies to avoid contact with offenders, tolerate the behaviour as the consequences might be frightening, or believe their efforts could be pointless.

Human rights protection for women in New Zealand

In 2018, Jackie Blue -the Employment Opportunities Commissioner- attended the Committee on the Elimination of Discrimination against Women (CEDAW) in Geneva. Jackie's mission was to present how the New Zealand Government protect women's rights. It is also an opportunity to identify what issues around human rights women face, including violence against women, labour inequity, pay inequity, inequality in leadership roles, workplace sexual harassment and worker exploitation. This results in a long discussion where government representatives respond, and the committee provides recommendations to address the issues. Subsequently, non-governmental institutions and the Human Rights Commission are responsible for guaranteeing the effectiveness of recommendations to benefit NZ women.

=== Needs assessments ===
Needs assessments, especially when the training is being conducted on a large-scale, are frequently conducted in order to gauge what needs to be trained, how it should be trained, and how extensively. Needs assessments in the training and development context often reveal employee and management-specific skills to develop (e.g., for new employees), organizational-wide problems to address (e.g., performance issues), adaptations needed to suit changing environments (e.g., new technology), or employee development needs (e.g., career planning). The needs assessment can predict the degree of effectiveness of training and development programs and how closely the needs were met, the execution of the training (i.e., how effective the trainer was), and trainee characteristics (e.g., motivation, cognitive abilities). Training effectiveness is typically done on an individual or team-level, with few studies investigating the impacts on organizations.

== Principles ==
Aik and Tway (2006) estimated that only 20–30% of training given to employees are used within the next month. To mitigate the issue, they recommended some general principles to follow to increase the employees' desire to take part in the program. These include:

- improving self-efficacy, which increases the learner's personal belief that they can fully comprehend the teachings
- maintaining a positive attitude, as an uncooperative attitude towards learning could hinder the individual's capability to grasp the knowledge being provided
- increasing competence, which is the ability for an individual to make good decisions efficiently
- providing external motivators, such as a reward for the completion of the training or an extrinsic goal to follow

=== Motivation ===
Motivation is an internal process that influences an employee's behavior and willingness to achieve organizational goals. Creating a motivational environment within an organization can help employees achieve their highest level of productivity, and can create an engaged workforce that enhances individual and organizational performance. The model for motivation is represented by motivators separated into two different categories:

- Intrinsic factors, which represent the internal factors of an individual, such as the difficulty of work, achievement recognition, responsibility, opportunity for meaningful work, involvement in decision making, and importance within the organization
- Extrinsic factors, which are factors external to the individual, such as job security, salary, benefits, work conditions, and vacations

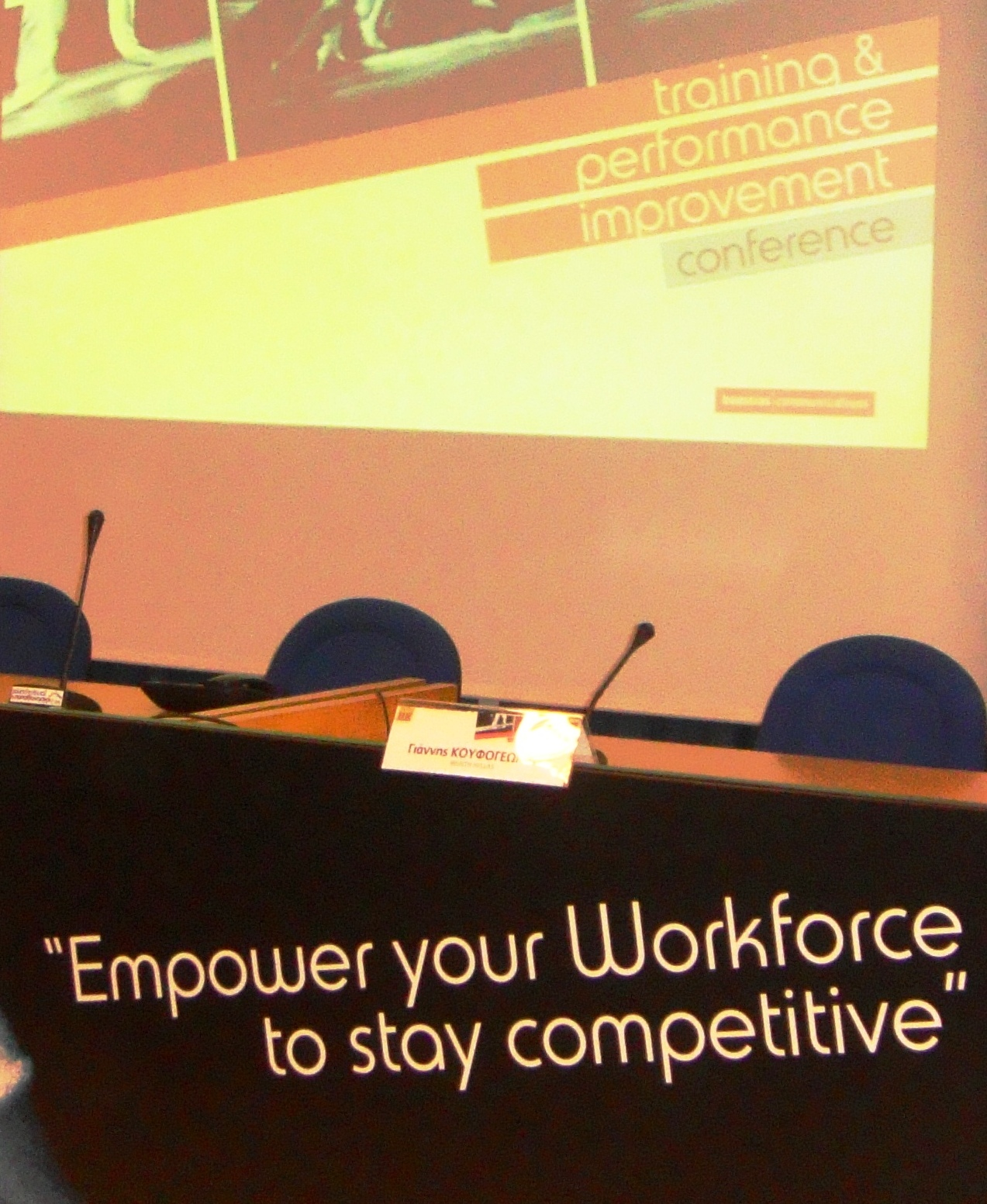
Training and development conference

Both intrinsic and extrinsic motivators associate with employee performance in the workplace. A company's techniques to motivate employees may change over time depending on the current dynamics of the workplace.

=== Feedback ===
Traditional constructive feedback, also known as weakness-based feedback, can often be viewed as malicious from the employees' perspective. When interpreted negatively, employees lose motivation on the job, affecting their production level.

Reinforcement is another principle of employee training and development. Studies have shown that reinforcement directly influences employee learning, which is highly correlated with performance after training. Reinforcement-based training emphasizes the importance of communication between managers and trainees in the workplace. The more the training environment can be a positive, nurturing experience, the faster attendees are apt to learn.

Retention

The training paradox represents the tension between training and development. Accord to human capital theory and monopsony theory, investment in employee portable training and development increases employee value to their current organisation, whilst also increasing value to other employers. The expansion of access to online resources has enhanced individuals’ awareness of employment opportunities. Within the public sector, moving to another agency can be interpreted as beneficial as the employees’ knowledge, skills and abilities remain in a position that supports the delivery of public services. Using German employer and employee longitudinal survey data, Dietz and Zwick established that training has a positive effect on retention as it increases human capital and turnover. Using German employer and employee longitudinal survey data, Dietz and Zwick established that training has a positive effect on retention as it increases human capital and turnover. The research found that the negative effects of training were exacerbated when the training was credible, particularly when provided and certified by external institutions. They determined that the decline in retention of portable human capital occurs regardless of its visibility and visible training that is not portable can still lead to reduced retention. Other research has found well-intentioned values-driven training can lead to a negative retention effect if the psychological demands training creates are not managed. A survey found that training that increases public servant's awareness of systematic causes of poverty may improve service delivery, but without measures to address the associated emotional demands, training may contribute to burnout and higher turnover rates.

== Benefits ==
The benefits of the training and development of employees include:

- increased productivity and performance in the workplace
- uniformity of work processes
- skills and team development
- reduced supervision and wastage
- a decrease in safety-related accidents
- improved organizational structure, designs and morale
- better knowledge of policies and organization's goals
- improved customer valuation
- Enhancements in public service motivation among public employees

However, training and development may lead to adverse outcomes if it is not strategic and goal-oriented. Additionally, there is a lack of consensus on the long-term outcomes of training investments; and in the public sector, managers often hold conservative views about the effectiveness of training.

Research suggests that training and development measures may improve employee's perceptions towards their employer. Research shows learning and development activities are vital for professionalism and quality of workers in the public sector.

Training and development activities affect variables that directly relate to individual and team performance including innovation, technical skills and self-management skills, as well as variables that are indirectly related to performance including communication and empowerment. At the organisational level, the benefits may include increased productivity and effectiveness as well as indirect outcomes like enhanced social capital and strengthened reputation. Some also claim that the value of training and development has the potential to generate value for society.

== Barriers and access to training ==
Training and development are crucial to organizational performance, employee career advancement and engagement.

Disparities in training can be caused by several factors, including societal norms and cultural biases that significantly impact the distribution of training opportunities. Stereotypes and implicit biases can undermine the confidence and performance of minority groups to seek out training, affecting their career development.

The impact of excluding or limiting a person's access to training and development opportunities can affect both the individual and the organization.

- Disparities in training opportunities can adversely affect individuals from underrepresented groups, leading to slower career progression, reduced employee engagement, and limited professional growth. Individuals may experience lower self-esteem and decreased motivation due to perceived or actual access to development opportunities. For example, if a leadership training program does not have minority representation, individuals may lack the confidence to "break the glass ceiling" and seek out the opportunity for themselves.
- When training opportunities are not equitably distributed, organizations may have reduced diversity in leadership and decision-making, which may stifle innovation and hinder organizational performance. Failure to address these disparities can lead to higher turnover rates and lower employee morale.

Management teams that are not diverse can be self-replicating as senior leaders' demographic characteristics significantly impact the types of programs, policies and practices implemented in the organisation – i.e., there are more likely to be diversity programs if the management team is also diverse.

To address these disparities, organizations can implement diversity policies, provide bias training, and establish mentorship programs to support underrepresented groups. These may include:

- Implementing inclusive policies for addressing disparities: organizations should establish diversity and inclusion programs that specifically target training and development opportunities for underrepresented groups, which should focus on opportunities for future managers at the bottom of the hierarchy, as advancement to lower-level and middle-level positions is crucial for promotion to upper-level management. These policies can help ensure employees have equal access to career advancement resources and can increase the implementation of mechanisms for reporting discrimination or advancement barriers. Some efforts to support diversity and exclusion commitments in workplaces may be enshrined in law, such as the New Zealand Public Service Act 2020.
- Developing mentorship and sponsorship programs: these programs can support underrepresented groups by providing them with guidance, networking opportunities, and advocacy within the organisation. Creating supportive networks for minority and gender groups can provide safe spaces for people identifying as minorities to develop programs that are suited to them and to provide a united voice to report ongoing discrimination.
- Using data to track and address disparities in training opportunities: this may include censuses or regular pulse surveys or records of learning that are linked to a person's self-identified attributes.

The current political climate in the United States has intensified debates around Diversity, Equity, and Inclusion (DEI) programs, leading to both challenges and shifts in corporate strategies. Increased political polarization, new state-level legislation, and public scrutiny have caused some companies to scale back or reframe DEI initiatives to avoid legal risks or reputational backlash. At the same time, many organizations remain committed to fostering inclusive workplaces, but are increasingly positioning DEI efforts under broader umbrellas like "talent development," "belonging," or "workplace culture" to navigate the evolving landscape. Overall, the environment has made DEI efforts more complex, requiring companies to be both strategic and resilient in advancing inclusive practices.

Occupation

The Occupational Information Network cites training and development specialists as having a bright outlook, meaning that the occupation will grow rapidly or have several job openings in the next few years. Related professions include training and development managers, (chief) learning officers, industrial-organizational psychologists, and organization development consultants. Training and development specialists are equipped with the tools to conduct needs analyses, build training programs to suit the organization's needs by using various training techniques, create training materials, and execute and guide training programs.

=== Costs associated with training ===
Multiple publications on training and development in the public sector highlight its significance in equipping employees to meet evolving skill and competency demands, as well as adapting to public sector reforms. Public sector training policies are affected by efficiency measures and cost-cutting initiatives. The implication of such may include cutbacks in training budgets and fewer time spent on training. The OECD highlights a contrast between these budget cuts and sustainable competition strategies. Some organisations remain uncertain about the overall return of investment of training programmes. A study noted that there is little consensus on how to assess training effectiveness at the level of individual employees. However, proponents of leadership development argue that the return on investment is measurable, citing data that links people-focused strategies to a 21% rise in profitability and improved business agility.

== Mentorship ==
Mentorship is a developmental relationship in which a more experienced individual (the mentor) provides guidance, support, and knowledge to a less experienced individual (the mentee) to foster their personal and professional growth. Within training and development, mentorship is recognised as a complementary approach to formal instruction, offering sustained, relationship-based learning tailored to the mentee's goals and the organisational context.

Mentorship can be formal, structured through organisational programmes with defined objectives and matching processes, or informal, arising organically through workplace relationships. Formal programmes often include scheduled meetings, goal-setting, and progressive reviews, while informal mentorship may be more flexible and driven by the mentee's immediate needs.

=== Conceptual Foundations ===
Researchers argue that despite the widespread use of mentorship in organisational settings, the concept has suffered from definitional ambiguity and inconsistent theoretical framing. They propose a unified definition of mentoring as “a process for the informal transmission of knowledge, social capital, and psychosocial support perceived by the recipient as relevant to work, career, or professional development.” This definition emphasises the mentee's perception of value, the informal nature of knowledge transfer, and the broader social and emotional dimension of mentoring. Additionally, it differentiates mentoring from related concepts such as coaching, advising, and role modelling.

=== Benefits ===
Mentorship has been associated with numerous benefits for not only individuals and organisations. It facilitates the transfer of knowledge, especially in complex or tacit areas, helping organisations preserve and share vital information. Mentorship also supports career development by providing mentees with access to networks, challenging assignments, and advancement opportunities. Moreover, mentees often report higher job satisfaction and greater commitment to their employers, which enhances employee engagement and retention. Leadership development is another key benefit, as mentorship nurtures skills such as emotional intelligence, strategic thinking and effective communication.

Targeted mentorship programmes can promote diversity and inclusion by enabling underrepresented groups to access career pathways and leadership roles. Mentorship can play a crucial role in transmitting social capital, including access to informal networks, social norms, and reputational benefits that are difficult to attain through formal training.

=== Mentorship Programme Design ===
For formalised mentorship programmes, effective mentorship will typically involve several key elements. First, a matching process, pairing mentors and mentees based on their goals, skills, and compatibility, to foster productive relationships. Mentors also require preparation, often through training in active listening, delivering effective feedback, and cultural awareness. Clear objectives are set from the start, including shared expectations, confidentiality agreements, and measurable goals to guide the mentoring relationship. Regular evaluation, using tools like surveys, interviews, or performance metrics, can be used to assess the programme's impact and drive continuous improvement. These mentorship programmes are often integrated into leadership pipelines, graduate development schemes, or professional associations, ensuring that mentoring supports the broader organisational development goals.

=== Challenges ===
Common challenges for both formalised and informal mentorship methods include mismatched expectations, time constraints, and insufficient organisational support. Without clear objectives and accountability, mentorship relationships may lose momentum. Additionally, poorly designed programmes risk reinforcing existing inequities if access to mentors is uneven across the workforce.

See also

- Adult education
- Andragogy
- Microtraining
