= Human performance technology =

Field ofstudy

Human performance technology (HPT), also known as human performance improvement (HPI), or human performance assessment (HPA), is a field of study related to process improvement methodologies such as organization development, motivation, instructional technology, human factors, learning, performance support systems, knowledge management, and training. It is focused on improving performance at the societal, organizational, process, and individual performer levels.

HPT "uses a wide range of interventions that are drawn from many other disciplines, including total quality management, process improvement, behavioral psychology, instructional systems design, organizational development, and human resources management" (ISPI, 2007). It stresses a rigorous analysis of requirements at the societal, organizational process and individual levels as appropriate to identify the causes for performance gaps, provide appropriate interventions to improve and sustain performance, and finally to evaluate the results against the requirements.

== History of HPT ==
The field of HPT, also referred to as Performance Improvement, emerged from the fields of educational technology and instructional technology in the 1950s and 1960s. In the postwar period, application of the Instructional Systems Design (ISD) model was not consistently returning the desired improvements to organizational performance. This led to the emergence of HPT as a separate field from ISD in the late 1960s to early 1970s when the National Society for Programmed Instruction was renamed the National Society for Performance and Instruction (NSPI) and then again to the International Society for Performance Improvement (ISPI) in 1995. (Chyung, 2008) HPT evolved as a systemic and systematic approach to address complex types of performance issues and to assist in the proper diagnosis and implementation of solutions to close performance gaps among individuals.

The origins of HPT can be primarily traced back to the work of Thomas Gilbert, Geary Rummler, Karen Brethower, Roger Kaufman, Bob Mager, Donald Tosti, Lloyd Homme and Joe Harless. They (Gilbert and Rummler in particular) were the pioneers of the field. Any serious investigation of early and later citations of Gilbert and Rummler's work will reveal subsequent academic and professional leaders in the field.

A major factor in the rise to prominence of what would become HPT was the publication of Analyzing Performance Problems in 1970 by Robert F. Mager and Peter Pipe. The success of their book, subtitled "You Really Oughta Wanna," served to draw attention to and expand awareness of the many factors affecting human performance in addition to the knowledge and skills of the performer. The Further Reading section of the 1970 edition of their book also cites a seminal paper by Karen S. Brethower: "Maintenance Systems: The Neglected Half of Behavior Change," which contains an early version of a performance deficiency analysis algorithm developed by Geary Rummler, then at the University of Michigan. Rummler, along with Tom Gilbert, would go on to found Praxis Corporation, a firm focused on improving performance. Later, Rummler would join forces with Alan Brache and the two of them would author Improving Performance, with a clear and expanded focus on process and organizational performance. In a related vein, Joe Harless was at work developing and refining his own approach to expanding and refining the way problems of human performance were being approached. In 1970, the same year Mager & Pipe published their landmark book, Harless, with the assistance of his associate and another notable in the field, Claude Lineberry, published An Ounce of Analysis (Is Worth A Pound of Objectives). This was the beginning of what became known as "Front-End Analysis (FEA)."

HPT professionals work in many different performance settings such as corporate, educational institutions, and the military (Bolin, 2007).

== Definitions of the field ==
The International Society for Performance Improvement defines HPT as:

"a systematic approach to improving productivity and competence, uses a set of methods and procedures -- and a strategy for solving problems -- for realizing opportunities related to the performance of people. More specifically, it is a process of selection, analysis, design, development, implementation, and evaluation of programs to most cost-effectively influence human behavior and accomplishment. It is a systematic combination of three fundamental processes: performance analysis, cause analysis, and intervention selection, and can be applied to individuals, small groups, and large organizations."(ISPI, 2012)

A simpler definition of HPT is a systematic approach to improving individual and organizational performance (Pershing, 2006).

A common misunderstanding of the word technology with regards to HPT is that it relates to information technologies. In HPT, technology refers to the specialized aspects of the field of Human Performance. Technology: the application of scientific knowledge for practical purposes, especially in industry. A branch of knowledge dealing with engineering or applied science.

The International Society for Performance Improvement has developed a glossary of HPT related terms.

== Characteristics of HPT ==
- HPT is based on the assumption that human performance is lawful, drawing principles from numerous fields including psychology, systems theory, engineering and business management (Chyung, 2008).
- HPT is empirical, using observations and experiments to inform decision making (Chyung, 2008).
- HPT is results oriented, producing measureable and cost effective changes in performance (Chyung, 2008).
- HPT is reactive and proactive in situations involving human performance to:

- reduce or eliminate barriers to desired performance (reactive);
- prevent the conditions allowing barriers to performance (proactive); and
- improve the quality of current performance (reactive and proactive)(Chyung, 2008).

- HPT uses both systematic and systemic approaches to solving performance problems (Chyung, 2008).
- HPT practitioners may consider other established, new, or emerging disciplines and fields of practice (such as organizational development, learning organizations, knowledge management, communities of practice, workplace design, lean and six sigma) that will assist in achieving desired goals (Stolovitch and Keeps, 1999).

== HPT Model ==
An HPT Model is available for viewing at the ispi.org website.

== Standards of Practice ==
The International Society for Performance Improvement (ISPI) codified a series of Standards in an effort to raise the quality of HPT practice:

- Focus on Results
- Take a Systems View
- Add Value
- Utilize Partnerships
- Systematic Assessment of Need or Opportunity
- Systematic Cause Analysis
- Systematic Design
- Systematic Development
- Systematic Implementation
- Systematic Evaluation

== See also ==
- International Society for Performance Improvement
- Business Process Improvement
- Business Process Reengineering
- Business Process Management
- Educational technology
- Instructional systems design
- Lean
- Organizational Development
- Process Improvement and Management (PI&M)
- Total Quality Management
