= Training =

Acquisition of knowledge, skills, and competencies as a result of teaching or practice

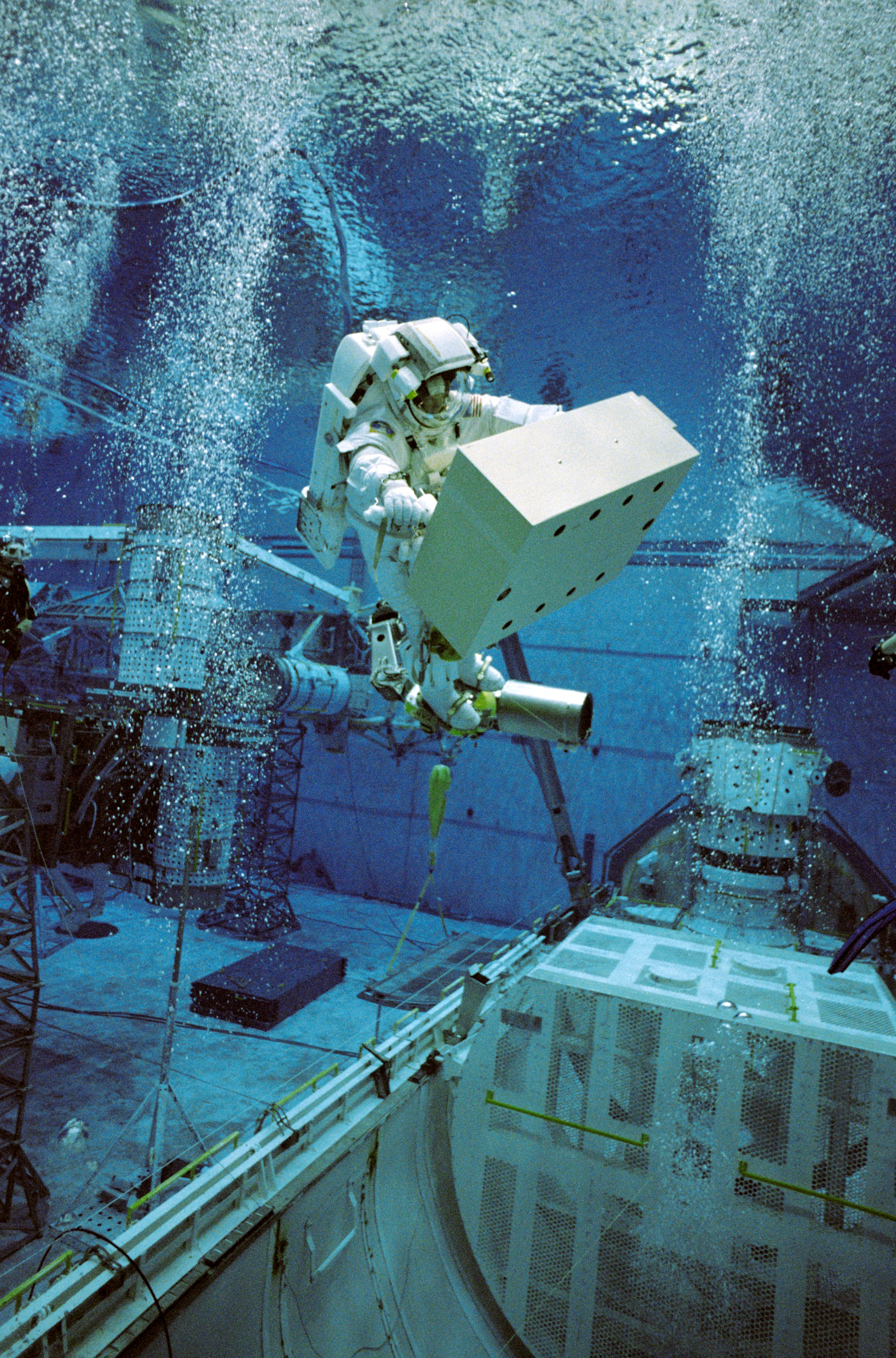
An astronaut in training for an extravehicular activity mission using an underwater simulation environment on Earth.

Training is teaching, or developing in oneself or others, any skills and knowledge or fitness that relate to specific useful competencies. Training has specific goals of improving one's capability, capacity, productivity and performance. It forms the core of apprenticeships and provides the backbone of content at institutes of technology (also known as technical colleges or polytechnics). In addition to the basic training required for a trade, occupation or profession, training may continue beyond initial competence to maintain, upgrade and update skills throughout working life. People within some professions and occupations may refer to this sort of training as professional development. Training also refers to the development of physical fitness related to a specific competence, such as sport, martial arts, military applications and some other occupations. Training methods of all types can be improved by setting specific, time-based, and difficult goals. This allows for the progressive mastery of a topic with a measured outcome.

== Types ==
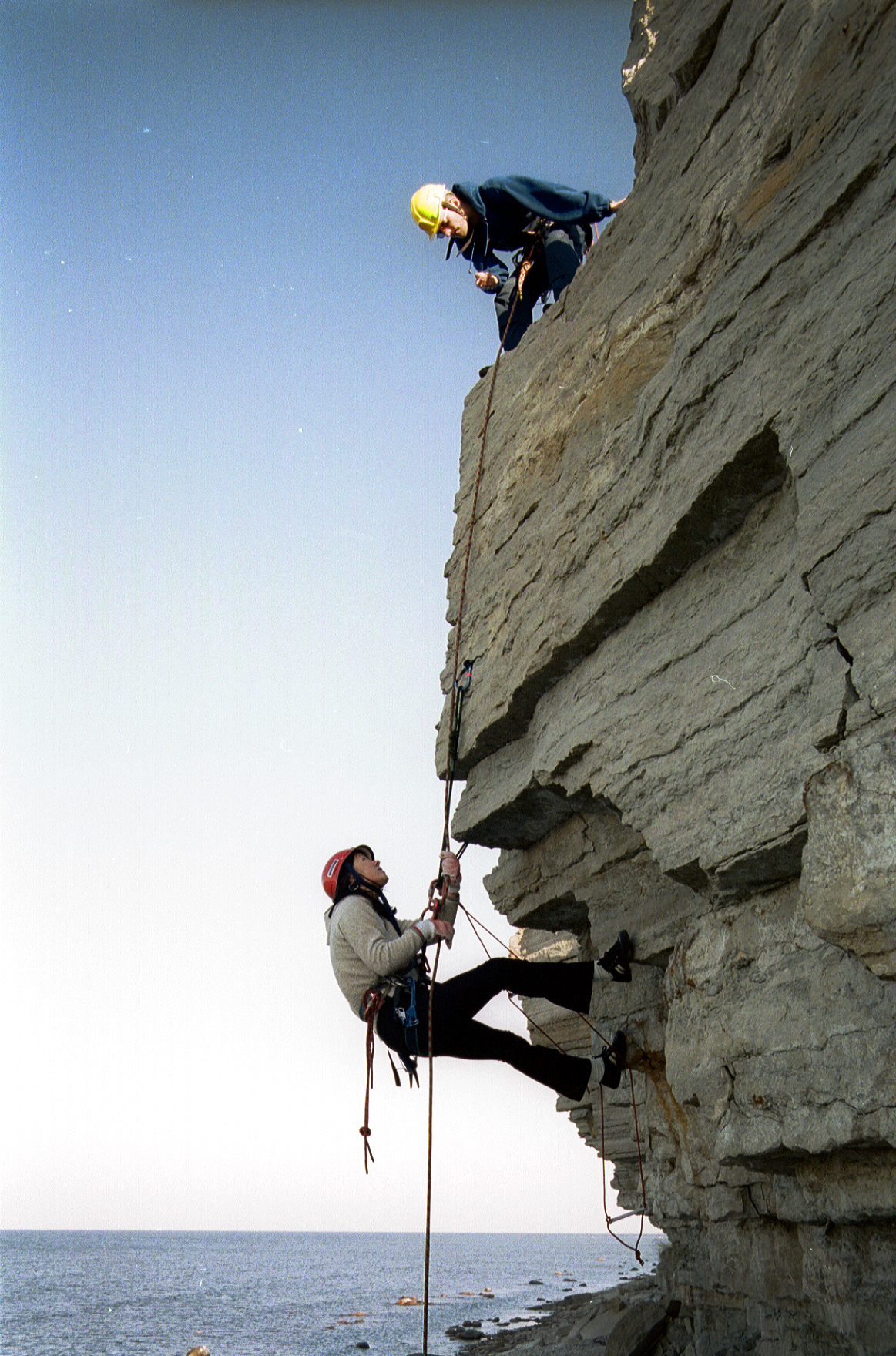
Mountaineering training in Estonia. It involves both instruction and physical exercise in the outdoor environment to develop skills that are necessary for survival in rock climbing.

=== Physical training ===
Physical training concentrates on mechanistic goals: training programs in this area develop specific motor skills, agility, strength or physical fitness, often with an intention of peaking at a particular time.

In military use, training means gaining the physical ability to perform and survive in combat, and learn the many skills needed in a time of war. These include how to use a variety of weapons, outdoor survival skills, and how to survive being captured by the enemy, among many others. See military education and training.

For psychological or physiological reasons, people who believe it may be beneficial to them can choose to practice relaxation training, or autogenic training, in an attempt to increase their ability to relax or deal with stress. While some studies have indicated relaxation training is useful for some medical conditions, autogenic training has limited results or has been the result of few studies.

=== Occupational skills training ===
Some occupations are inherently hazardous, and require a minimum level of competence before the practitioners can perform the work at an acceptable level of safety to themselves or others in the vicinity. Occupational diving, rescue, firefighting and operation of certain types of machinery and vehicles may require assessment and certification of a minimum acceptable competence before the person is allowed to practice as a licensed instructor.

=== On-the-job training ===
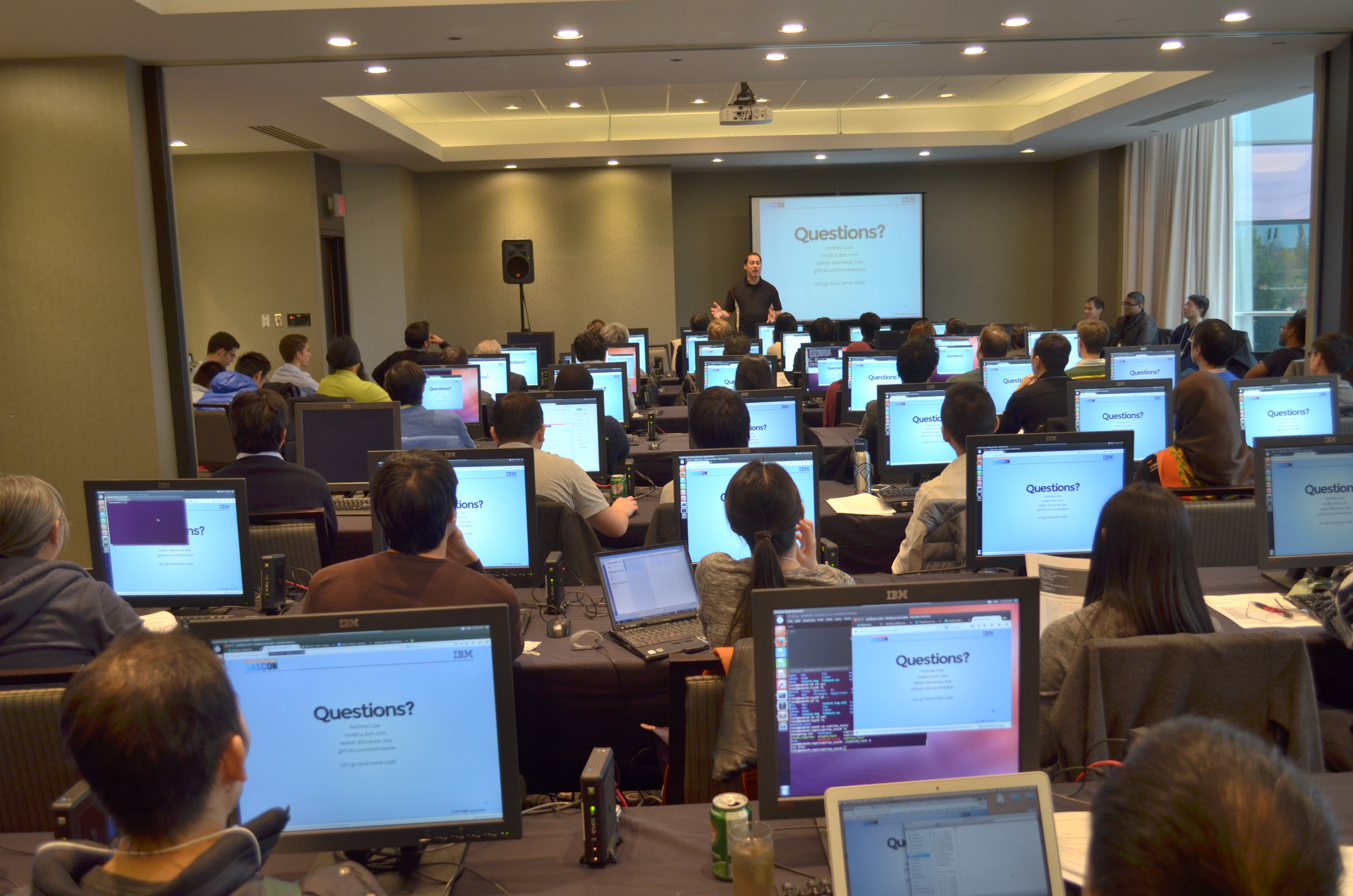
Computer skills training

Some commentators use a similar term for workplace learning to improve performance: "training and development". There are also additional services available online for those who wish to receive training above and beyond what is offered by their employers. Some examples of these services include career counseling, skill assessment, and supportive services. One can generally categorize such training as on-the-job or off-the-job.

The on-the-job training method takes place in a normal working situation, using the actual tools, equipment, documents or materials that trainees will use when fully trained. On-the-job training has a general reputation as most effective for vocational work. It involves employees training at the place of work while they are doing the actual job. Usually, a professional trainer (or sometimes an experienced and skilled employee) serves as the instructor using hands-on practical experience which may be supported by formal classroom presentations. Sometimes training can occur by using web-based technology or video conferencing tools. On-the-job training is applicable on all departments within an organization.

Simulation based training is another method which uses technology to assist in trainee development. This is particularly common in the training of skills requiring a very high degree of practice, and in those which include a significant responsibility for life and property. An advantage is that simulation training allows the trainer to find, study, and remedy skill deficiencies in their trainees in a controlled, virtual environment. This also allows the trainees an opportunity to experience and study events that would otherwise be rare on the job, e.g., in-flight emergencies, system failure, etc., wherein the trainer can run 'scenarios' and study how the trainee reacts, thus assisting in improving his/her skills if the event was to occur in the real world. Examples of skills that commonly include simulator training during stages of development include piloting aircraft, spacecraft, locomotives, and ships, operating air traffic control airspace/sectors, power plant operations training, advanced military/defense system training, and advanced emergency response training like fire training or first-aid training.

Off-the-job training method takes place away from normal work situations — implying that the employee does not count as a directly productive worker while such training takes place. Off-the-job training method also involves employee training at a site away from the actual work environment. It often utilizes lectures, seminars, case studies, role playing, and simulation, having the advantage of allowing people to get away from work and concentrate more thoroughly on the training itself. This type of training has proven more effective in inculcating concepts and ideas. Many personnel selection companies offer a service which would help to improve employee competencies and change the attitude towards the job. The internal personnel training topics can vary from effective problem-solving skills to leadership training.

A more recent development in job training is the On-the-Job Training Plan or OJT Plan. According to the United States United States Department of the Interior, a proper OJT plan should include an overview of the subjects to be covered, the number of hours the training is expected to take, an estimated completion date, and a method by which the training will be evaluated.

=== Religion and spirituality ===
In religious and spiritual use, the word "training" may refer to the purification of the mind, heart, understanding and actions to obtain a variety of spiritual goals such as (for example) closeness to God or freedom from suffering. Examples include the institutionalised spiritual training of Threefold Training in Buddhism, meditation in Hinduism or discipleship in Christianity. These aspects of training can be short-term or can last a lifetime, depending on the context of the training and which religious group it is a part of.

In relation to Christian formation, spiritual training may be viewed as complementary to pastoral and academic training, for example in the training of Catholic clergy.

=== Artificial-intelligence feedback ===
Learning processes developed for artificial intelligence are typically also known as training. Evolutionary algorithms, including genetic programming and other methods of machine learning, use a system of feedback based on "fitness functions" to allow computer programs to determine how well an entity performs a task. The methods construct a series of programs, known as a “population” of programs, and then automatically test them for "fitness", observing how well they perform the intended task. The system automatically generates new programs based on members of the population that perform the best. These new members replace programs that perform the worst. The procedure repeats until the achievement of optimum performance. In robotics, such a system can continue to run in real-time after initial training, allowing robots to adapt to new situations and to changes in themselves, for example, due to wear or damage. Researchers have also developed robots that can appear to mimic simple human behavior as a starting point for training.

== See also ==
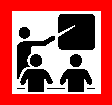
Training pictogram

- Athletic training – Healthcare profession
- Course evaluation – Questionnaire completed by students to evaluate an academic course
- Dance – Art form consisting of body movement
- Education – Transmission of knowledge and skills
- Industrial and organizational psychology – Branch of psychology
- Facilitator – Person who helps a group understand common objectives & reach them
- Gamification – Using game design elements in non-games
- HRD (human resource development) – Improving the effectiveness of organizations and the individuals and teams within them
- Large-group capacitation – Adult education and social psychology concept
- Learning – Process of acquiring new knowledge
- Microtraining – Support method for informal learning processes in organisations
- Physical education – Educational subject related to sport and exercise
- Practice (learning method) – Action in learning
- Retraining – Process of learning a new or upgrading an old skill set or trade
- Supercompensation – Post-training period of high performance (physical fitness)
- Training and development – Improving the effectiveness of organizations and the individuals and teams within them
- Training simulation – Virtual medium through which various types of skills can be acquired
