= Needs assessment =

Systematic process for determining needs

A needs assessment is a systematic process for determining and addressing needs, or "gaps", between current conditions, and desired conditions, or "wants".

Needs assessments can help improve policy or program decisions, individuals, education, training, organizations, communities, or products.

There are three types of need in a needs assessment: perceived need, expressed need and relative need.

1. Perceived needs are defined by what people think about their needs; each standard changes with each respondent.
2. Expressed needs are defined by the number of people who have sought help and focuses on circumstances where feelings are translated into action. A major weakness of expressed needs assumes that all people with needs seek help.
3. Relative needs are concerned with equity and must consider differences in population and social pathology.

== History ==
Considered the "father of needs assessment", Roger Kaufman developed a model for determining needs defined as a gap in results. Kaufman argued that an actual need can only be identified independent of a proposed solution. According to Kaufman, to conduct a good-quality needs assessment, determine the current results and articulate the desired results; the distance between results is the actual need. Once a need is identified, then a solution can be selected.

== Extensive vs. intensive ==
Extensive research uses a large number of cases to determine the characteristics of a population, while intensive research examines one or a few cases in depth.

Once the group has identified needs, they then generally turn to intensive needs assessment in order to rank the needs. This part of the research is concerned with examining the depth of the need, and potentially required resources.

== Needs chain model ==
A needs chain model is a framework that allows organizations to simultaneously consider the individuals' needs within an organization, and the organization's needs, in order to prioritise resources and identify areas of improvement for the organization.

A needs chain model is composed of aligned horizontal and vertical processes. The horizontal needs are:

- Performance need: A level of performance required for satisfactory functioning.
- Instrumental need: An intervention, product, or substance that is required to obtain satisfactory functioning.
- Conscious need: Needs that are known to those who have them.
- Unconscious need: Needs that is unknown to those who have them.

Also, it has four vertical factors:

- Organizational need: Needs that pertain to behavior or tangible outcomes, such as market share or sales target.
- Individual needs: Needs that pertain to the individual's attitudes about the organization or themselves, such as job satisfaction.
- Causes
- Level of objectivity for all needs: This level requires all needs to have a certain level of objectivity, and to be based on deep investigation or further analysis.

== Training needs assessment ==
Training needs assessment is an inquiry of training needs within an organization.

There are three levels of training needs assessment:

- Organizational assessments evaluate the level of organizational performance. An assessment of this type will determine the knowledge, skills, ability, and other characteristics (KSAOs) that are needed within the organization.
- Occupational assessments examine the KSAOs required for affected occupational groups.
- Individual assessments analyze how well an individual employee is doing a job and determines the individual's capacity to do different work. An individual assessment provides information on which employees need training and what kind.

== Community ==
A community needs assessment can be broadly categorized into three types based on their respective starting points. First, needs assessments which aim to discover weaknesses within the community and create a solution. Second, needs assessments which are structured around, and seek to address a problem facing the community. Third, needs assessments of an organization which serves the community (domestic violence centers, community health clinics, etc.).

Consumer leadership assessment is an assessment of the frequency with which community members use or are likely to use an existing or planned service.

== Example ==
Burke (2005) examined statistics that showed a need within the community of Bayview Hunters Point in order to "identify gaps in service delivery system to create a road map for improving neighborhood conditions by rationalizing the allocation of city dollars to social service programs".

== See also ==
- Environmental impact assessment
- Futures techniques
- Requirements analysis
