= Roger Kaufman =

American educational technology and performance improvement researcher

- Born: 1932
- Died: September 23, 2020 (aged 88)

Academic work
- Institutions: Florida State University
- Main interests: Educational technology, performance improvement, needs assessment

Roger Kaufman (1932–2020), was an American figure in the history of educational technology and performance improvement, as well as in strategic thinking and planning for public and private-sector organizations. He is regarded as one of the field's founding figures, referred to as the father of needs assessment.

Kaufman developed the mega-planning model, a framework for adding measurable value to society.

== Needs Assessment ==
One of the defining chaOnly once a gap, or need, is accurately identified characteristics of Kaufman's work is his emphasis on "need" as a noun, not a verb; it is a gap in results and consequences, not a gap in resources or methods. Kaufman explains when "need" is used as a verb, it presupposes a solution before identifying the actual problem to be solved. When using 'need' as a verb, an intervention has been selected before a clear definition of the actual gap in results that would be addressed. Once a gap, or need, is accurately identified, only then can a means be sensibly selected for moving from current to desired results.

Kaufman expanded this approach to "need" from looking at gaps in products to gaps in outputs and then outcomes: from building block results to results delivered outside the organization to external client and societal results – what the organization uses, does, produces, and delivers and the consequences all of that adds measurable value for our shared society. Used in this way, cost-consequences estimates may be made to prioritize closing gaps based on the cost of meeting the need as compared to the costs of ignoring the need.

Kaufman identified three types, or levels, of needs: Mega, Macro, and Micro. And Change, Choices, and Consequences, published by HRD Press. The following table details the levels of needs and their definitions.

Name of the Organizational Element & Level of Planning	Brief Description
Outcomes/Mega	Results and their consequences for external clients and society
Outputs/Macro	The results an organization can or does deliver outside of itself
Products/Micro	The building-block results that are produced within the organization
Processes	The ways, means, activities, procedures and methods used internally
Inputs	The human, physical, and financial resources and organization can or does use

These levels of needs are also levels of planning for any organization and indicate a relationship between the levels. Alignment of objectives at each level is critical to ensure that planning translates into clear organizational operations and ensure that activities at each level add value back up the chain linking measurable to societal value-added. As a consequence, no level of results is any more important than the others. Rather, it is the alignment of all levels that is critical to achieving desired results.

Extensive examples of planning and aligned objectives can be found in Moore, 2010 and Moore, Ellsworth & Kaufman, 2008.

== Mega Planning ==
Kaufman developed a model for strategic thinking and planning, called "Mega Planning." Kaufman argues that many organizational planning models incorrectly begin with, and end with internal or organizational performance, therefore restricting organizations from a chance to plan how they deliver value outside of their organizations. Traditional planning ends with "Macro" level results, which are organizational results such as profits, graduation rates, ratings, etc. While these are important measures of organizational performance, they do not indicate the impact of an organization on external clients and society. Kaufman's model is similar to some of the concepts behind "double bottom line" literature.

"Mega Planning" starts with the question of "What kind of world do you want for your children and grandchildren?" with responses distilled in terms of consequences. An Ideal Vision defines the measurable variables for Mega planning including survival, self-sufficiency, and quality of life. He calls Mega planning (a system approach) "Mother's Rule" because if you ask just about any mother what kind of world they want for their children, they don't talk to means (credentials of teachers, money spent on social programs) but the survival, health, and happiness of their children.

=== Basic Ideal Vision for Society – indicators for societal well-being ===
BASIC IDEAL VISION:

The world we want to help create for tomorrow's child

There will be no losses of life nor elimination or reduction of levels of well-being, survival, self-sufficiency, and quality of life from any source, including (but not limited to):
- War and/or riot and/or terrorism
- Unintended human-caused changes to the environment including permanent destruction of the environment and/or rendering it nonrenewable
- Murder, rape, or crimes of violence, robbery, or destruction to property
- Substance abuse
- Disease
- Pollution
- Starvation and/or malnutrition
- Destructive behavior, including child, partner, spouse, self, elder, and others
- Discrimination based on irrelevant variable including color, race, age, creed, gender, religion, wealth, national origin, or location

Poverty will not exist, and every woman and man will earn at least as much as it costs them to live unless they are progressing toward being self-sufficient and self-reliant. No adult will be under the care, custody, or control of another person, agency, or substance. All adult citizens will be self-sufficient and self-reliant as minimally indicated by their consumption being equal to or less than their production. This becomes the basis for defining a vision and mission statement that map out exactly how an organization, of any type, will add measurable value to society.

Kaufman's model is argued to be the first business planning model that makes a business case for social responsibility and that establishes a data-based construct for organizational planning and evaluation that goes beyond the walls of the organization. Recent work by McKinsey & Co's Ian Davis (the Economist, 2005) aligns with this concept. The model was developed over many years and across multiple countries and cultures to validate the measures. Moore conducted a factor and reliability analysis of the construct, finding that all measures loaded onto a single factor (i.e. described a single concept), r=.95 (a notably high reliability). Kaufman's model has sometimes been referred to as "Kirkpatrick Plus" – an extension of Kirkpatrick's Four Levels of Evaluation by adding Mega—societal value added as a fifth level. However, the debate over this is a rather long-standing one. Some practitioners in the field argue that the fifth level of evaluation is ROI, or "return on investment," evaluation.

== Examples / Case Studies of Applied Mega ==
At the Sonora Institute of Technology (ITSON) in Sonora, Mexico, Kaufman and Mariano Bernardez worked with a senior faculty and the President of the institute to create a certification, Master's degree, and Ph.D. based on needs assessment and Mega planning. Bernardez developed a Mega-based, social impact-centered educational and consulting design for graduating companies and projects under the motto "Give your company a PhD." Students at the Ph.D. level must work in a company or head of a company and apply the Mega principles in a real-world project. Guerra and Rodriguez first described evidence of ITSON's results.

Another case study is a project for the president and minister of tourism of Panama taking a systemic approach using the Mega planning model to address issues of high crime, low standard of living, and other measures of social impact. Using the metaphor of "city doctors," Bernardez, Vallarino, Krivatsy, and Kaufman (2012) identified the "symptoms" of Colon City, Panama, developed a shared vision for Colon based on Kaufman's Basic Ideal Vision, prioritized, and set goals for the major strategic indicators (such as security, job creation and employment, recovery of real estate values, increase in tourism revenue, and health and sanitation).

== Roger Kaufman Awards ==
In 2014, the International Society for Performance Improvement established the Roger Kaufman Award for Societal impact. This award is given to individuals and organizations who demonstrate continuous improvement and measurable positive societal impact (see ISPI award info). The following are award recipients for each year:

- 2014 – Gonzalo Rodriguez Villanueva
- 2015 – Frances Hasselbeim
- 2016 – USAID
- 2017:
  - For-profit – John Mackey
  - Non-profit – US Coast Guard
  - Social Startup – Blake Mycoskie (Toms Shoes)
- 2018:
  - For-profit – Barcelona Activa
  - Non-profit – Barrio 31
  - Social Startup – Elementos Argentinos
- 2019:
  - Non-profit (CSO) – Never Again Rwanda
  - Startup (Ecosystem) – Arizona-Sonora Megaregion
  - Book Award – The Prosperity Paradox
