= Thomas Gilbert (engineer) =

Thomas F. Gilbert (1927–1995) was a psychologist who is often known as the founder of the field of performance technology, also known as Human Performance Technology (HPT). Gilbert himself coined and used the term Performance Engineering. Gilbert applied his understanding of behavioral psychology to improve human performance at work and at school. He is best known for his book Human Competence: Engineering Worthy Performance. Gilbert devised HPT when he realized that formal learning programs often only brought about a change in knowledge, not a change in behavior. Other techniques were needed to bring about a lasting change in behavior.

Gilbert spent a year on a post-doctoral sabbatical working with the behavioral psychologist B. F. Skinner at Harvard University and with Ogden R. Lindsley in Lindsley's laboratory at Metropolitan State Hospital in Waltham, Massachusetts. Gilbert received his BA and MA degrees at the University of South Carolina and his PhD in psychology from the University of Tennessee. His specialties were statistics, testing and measurement. (See Ogden Lindsley's memoriam in the references section.)

Gilbert applied this model to the world of work and school by observing that performance is a function of an interaction between a person's behavior and his or her environment (P = B × E) and then defining the elements of the ABC model within each of these two domains. He called the resulting model the Performance Engineering Model, and used it to identify opportunities to systematically develop the managerially controllable systems and other factors in the work and school environments which support employee/student performance. These improvements sometimes resulted in dramatic increases in performance.

Gilbert developed the behavior and environment registers of the model outlined above with the basic framework of the Skinnerian operant behavioral model. This framework = Discriminative Stimulus --> Response --> Reinforcing or Aversive Stimulus (= SD --> R --> S+/-).

This paradigm can be summarized as the ABC model: Antecedents lead to Behaviors which, in turn, lead to Consequences. The nature of these consequences affect the probability of future expressions of this behavior. In other words, behaviors are prompted by stimuli (antecedents) which then result in responses (the behaviors themselves) which are, in turn, followed by consequences. Consequences either increase (reinforcement) or decrease (punishment) the probability of future repetition of this behavior.

Conjointly using these two models in a 2x3 matrix (P = B × E to create a top and bottom row, and the ABC model to create three columns across each of the two rows), Gilbert identified six variables which he believed were necessary to improve human performance: information, resources, incentives, knowledge, capacity, and motives. Gilbert called this 2x3 matrix his Behavior Engineering Model (BEM). Gilbert believed that it was absence of performance support at work, not an individual's lack of knowledge or skill, that was the greatest barrier to exemplary performance. Therefore, he believed it was most necessary to focus on variables in the work environment before addressing variables at the individual level.

Gilbert's work has created much of the organizing framework upon which the International Society for Performance Improvement (ISPI) is based. The ISPI award the Thomas F. Gilbert Distinguished Professional Achievement Award, previously called the Outstanding Member and Distinguished Professional Achievement, that was renamed in 1996 in honor of Gilbert.

Ogden Lindsley's memoriam to Gilbert appeared in ABAI's The Behavior Analyst in 1996.

== Published works ==
- Gilbert, T. F. (1978, 2007). Human competence: Engineering worthy performance. Publication of the International Society for Performance Improvement. San Francisco, CA: Pfeiffer.
