= Donald Kirkpatrick =

American academic writer (1924–2014)

Donald L. Kirkpatrick (March 15, 1924 – May 9, 2014) was professor emeritus at the University of Wisconsin in the United States and a past president of the American Society for Training and Development (ASTD). He is best known for creating a highly influential 'four level' model for training course evaluation, which served as the subject of his Ph.D. dissertation in 1954. Kirkpatrick's ideas were published to a broader audience in 1959 in a series of articles in the US Training and Development Journal, but they are better known from a book he published in 1994 entitled Evaluating Training Programs. Other books that he has written on training evaluation include Transferring Learning to Behavior and Implementing the Four Levels. His work is carried on by his eldest son, Dr. Jim Kirkpatrick, and Wendy Kayser Kirkpatrick, and Vanessa Alzate.

== Kirkpatrick Model of Training Evaluation ==
Kirkpatrick's ideas have roots in those of Raymond Katzell, whose four corresponding evaluation questions are cited in Kirkpatrick's early 1956 article in the Journal of the American Society of Training Directors, "How to start an objective evaluation of your training program."

Kirkpatrick's four levels are designed as a sequence of ways to evaluate training programs. Many practitioners believe that as you proceed through each of the levels, the evaluation becomes more difficult and requires more time. Clomedia.com Editor suggests "it is best to look at the levels as a categorization scheme (i.e., their original purpose) in order to guide your staff in what levels to apply to the evaluation task". In practice, then, it is common for trainers to get stuck in Levels 1 and 2 and never proceed to Levels 3 and 4, where the most useful data exist. Today, Kirkpatrick-certified facilitators stress "starting with the end in mind," essentially beginning with Level 4 and moving backward in order to better establish the desired outcome before ever planning the training program. When done strategically, reaching these levels does not have to be any more expensive or time-consuming, but will still help to ensure on-the-job performance of learned behaviors and skills.

The four levels of Kirkpatrick's evaluation model are as follows:

1. Reaction - The degree to which participants find the training favorable, engaging and relevant to their jobs
2. Learning - The degree to which participants acquire the intended knowledge, skills, attitude, confidence and commitment based on their participation in the training
3. Behavior - The degree to which participants apply what they learned during training when they are back on the job
4. Results - The degree to which targeted outcomes occur as a result of the training and the support and accountability package

Several authors have suggested an addition of a fifth level of evaluation. JJ Phillips has argued for the addition of a Return on Investment (ROI) level, which is essentially about comparing the fourth level of the standard model to the overall costs of training. Roger Kaufman has argued that ROI is essentially a Level 4 type of evaluation because it is still internal to the organization and that a fifth level of evaluation should focus on the impact of the organization on external clients and society.

== Bibliography ==
- Kirkpatrick, Donald L., & Kirkpatrick, J. (1994). Evaluating Training Programs, Berrett-Koehler Publishers
- Kirkpatrick, Donald L., & Kirkpatrick, J. (2005). Transferring Learning to Behavior, Berrett-Koehler Publishers
- Kirkpatrick, Donald L., & Kirkpatrick, J. (2007). Implementing the Four Levels, Berrett-Koehler Publishers
