= International Society for Performance Improvement =

Non-profit association

- Formation: 1962
- Type: Professional association
- Headquarters: Silver Spring, Maryland
- President: Yvon Dalat
- Website: http://www.ispi.org

The International Society for Performance Improvement (ISPI) is a non-profit association for performance improvement professionals dedicated to improving individual, organizational, and societal functioning, productivity, and accomplishment in the workplace.

== Membership ==
ISPI has both a US and international membership base with members in more than 53 countries. In addition to the international organization ISPI sponsors local chapters in major cities through the United States and Canada and has affiliates in Europe, Africa, and Asia as well as members in South America and Australia. The association's members work in various types of organizations, including business, industry, government, military, education (K-12 and post-secondary), non-profit and as independent consultants.

== Professional Standards and Ethics ==
With its roots in the 1960s, Human Performance Technology (HPT), sometimes known as Human Performance Improvement (HPI), grew primarily from behavioral psychology and Instructional Systems Design (ISD). Nowadays HPT also draws from many other disciplines such as Human Factors, quality improvement, process improvement, Instructional and Educational Technologies, Organization Development, motivation and reward research, training research to change performance and achieve worthy outcomes. (See ISPI, 2007.)

HPT aims to overcome problems and address opportunities for improved outcomes at societal, organizational, process and individual levels. It uses systemic, rigorous analytical processes to identify and define requirements for change, determine existing obstacles and potential facilitators for specified changes, and select and develop appropriate interventions to improve outcomes. Following tenets of evidence-based practice, HPT also initiates and implements interventions effectively to achieve meaningful and sustained change in outcomes throughout their life cycle. Evaluation is also a central aspect of HPT, and is used during planning, carrying out, and following up interventions by measuring results against identified requirements.

In 2002 ISPI convened a group of workplace managers, business consultants, and academics met to define what skills and abilities a performance technology practitioner needed. That group established a set of ten standards of performance:

1. Focus on Results,
2. Take a Systems View,
3. Add Value,
4. Utilize Partnerships,
5. Systematically Assess the Opportunity or Need,
6. Identify the Factors That Limit Performance,
7. Design the Solution or the Speciation for the Solution,
8. Create (Develop) the Solution,
9. Implement the Solution, and
10. Evaluate the Process and Its Results.

That set of standards was validated in a subsequent study conducted by graduate students at Indiana University.

In addition to the ten standards, ISPI created a code of ethics as a guide for its members. This set of standards and code of ethics are a basis for ISPI's Certified Performance Technologist credential (CPT).

The CPT designation permits individuals to demonstrate proficiency in the ten Standards of Performance Technology. This demonstration enables employers and clients to determine the qualifications and applied skills of a performance improvement professional with a standardized measurement. The certification indicates that the CPT has demonstrated that her or his work results in measurable positive impact in the workplace. The certification also provides the CPT with the means to promote his or her skills and experience. Since the certification is performance-based, not education-based, individuals who demonstrate proficiency in ten Standards of Performance Technology and commit to the ISPI Code of Ethics can be certified regardless of their educational background. Re-certification is required every three years thus demonstrating ongoing learning, growth and professional development.

== About ISPI ==
The roots of ISPI began on January 29, 1962, at the Randolph Air Force Base Officers' Club in San Antonio, Texas, during a dinner meeting held to organize the Programmed Learning Society. The stated purpose of the Society was to collect, develop, and diffuse information concerned with programmed instruction.

In March 1962 the Society adopted a new name—National Society for Programmed Instruction (NSPI) and a constitution was adopted.

In 1973 the name was changed to National Society for Performance and Instruction to reflect a broader interest in improving workplace performance using solutions that are both instructional and non-instructional (job-aids, work redesign, process improvement, etc.).

In 1992 the Human Performance Technology (HPT) model was developed to reflect the work of Thomas Gilbert, one of the founders of the field of human performance improvement and a long-time member of NSPI. That same year the Handbook of Human Performance Technology edited by Harold Stolovitch and Erica Keeps was co-published with Jossey-Bass, Inc. to provide readers with the first comprehensive guide to the fundamental knowledge necessary to improve human performance in the workplace.

In June 1995 the membership voted to change the name to the International Society for Performance Improvement. With members living and working in more than 30 countries, it was felt that ISPI more accurately reflected the breadth and geographic diversity of the membership and acknowledged the wide variety of interventions that comprise human performance technology. That same year the Board approved funding to establish the ISPI Book Program. The book program better positioned ISPI as the primary source of information about HPT.

In 1996 the Board approved the development of a Research Endowment, investing $150,000 with the interest being used to fund research projects. The fund's support of research to advance the field of human performance ensured ISPI's continuing leadership as the primary disseminator of performance improvement information.

In 1999 the Principles & Practices Institute debuted at Annual Conference. The three-day Institute was designed disseminate the integration of HPT models, concepts, and research findings through the analysis of real cases for the first time. The Handbook for Human Performance: Improving Individual and Organizational Performance Worldwide (2nd Edition) edited by Erica Keeps and Harold Stolovitch debuted at Annual Conference in 1999. The revised Handbook focused on the global nature of HPT.

== Continuing Professional Education ==
ISPI hosts an annual conference in major cities in the U.S. and Canada. The ISPI EMEA affiliate hosts an annual conference in Europe. Additional educational events include pre-conference one- and two-day workshops, a monthly webinar, a quarterly experts' series, the Performance and Practices Institute, the Certified Performance Technology Workshop and topics presented at local chapter meetings throughout the year.

== Publications ==
ISPI publishes information relevant to human performance improvement in three publications. Each is described below.

=== Performance Improvement Journal (PIJ) ===
PIJ is geared toward practitioners of performance technology in the workplace. Learn from hands-on experiences with models, interventions, "how-to" guides, and ready-to-use job aids, as well as research articles. Performance Improvement also offers updates on trends, reviews, and field viewpoints. The journal deals with all types of interventions and all phases of the HPT process. The common theme is performance improvement practice or technique that is supported by research or germane theory. PIJ is published 6 times each year.

=== Performance Improvement Quarterly (PIQ) ===
PIQ is a peer-reviewed journal created to stimulate professional discussion in the field and to advance the discipline of HPT through publishing scholarly works. Its emphasis is on human performance technologies such as front-end analysis or evaluation. It also offers literature reviews and experimental studies with a scholarly base, and some case studies. PIQ is published four times each year.(ISSN 0898-5952)

== See also ==
- Human Performance Technology
- Behaviorism
- Organizational Development
- Total Quality Management
- Kaizen
- Six Sigma
- Lean
