= Ronald Ferguson (economist) =

American economist

Ronald F. Ferguson (born 1950) is an American economist and educator known for his research and contributions to addressing educational disparities in the United States. He has focused on issues ranging from state and local economic development to school reform and early childhood parenting.

Major themes in his work relate to the race-related achievement gap in the United States and how to improve schools, identify effective teachers, and strengthen parenting practices. He retired from teaching in 2024 after 41 years on the faculty at Harvard Kennedy School, where he retains an affiliation with the Malcolm Wiener Center for Social Policy. He is the founder and current executive director of The Basics, Inc., a nonprofit organization.

== Education ==
Ferguson was born in Cleveland, Ohio. He earned an undergraduate degree from Cornell University and a PhD from the Massachusetts Institute of Technology, both in economics.

== Career ==
Ferguson was appointed to Harvard University in 1983.

Ferguson's research with Helen Ladd during the 1980s on the Massachusetts Miracle (the economic transformation of the state's economy ) drew international attention during Massachusetts Governor Michael Dukakis’ 1988 presidential campaign, when Dukakis said he could do for the nation what he had done for Massachusetts. The Ferguson/Ladd report credited broader economic forces, attributing only a small role to state policy.

During the 1990s, Ferguson led the National Community Development Policy Analysis Network (NCDPAN), the research arm of the National Community Development Initiative (which in 2001 became Living Cities). In 1999, two dozen nationally prominent social scientists in NCDPAN completed the volume Urban Problems and Community Development, published by Brookings Press. Ferguson co-edited the book with William T. Dickens and contributed three synthesis chapters.

In 2001, Ferguson founded The Tripod Project working with educators in Shaker Heights, Ohio and the Minority Student Achievement Network to develop the first generation of Tripod Student Surveys for understanding how classroom experiences affect achievement gaps.

In 2008, Tripod Student Surveys became the student voice measure for the Bill & Melinda Gates Foundation project on Measures of Effective Teaching (MET). From 2009-2013, the MET project engaged nearly 3,000 K–12 teachers in multiple school districts to administer Tripod surveys. Tripod surveys have also gone international, reaching classrooms in the US, China, and Canada. These surveys ask students to agree or disagree with factual questions relating to good teaching practices, such as "Our class stays busy and does not waste time", rather than asking whether the student likes the teacher or would recommend them to others.

In 2005, Ferguson became the faculty director and co-chair with professors Charles Ogletree and Richard Murnane of the Achievement Gap Initiative (AGI) at Harvard University. He served as a Senior Lecturer in Education and Public Policy with a joint appointment to the Harvard Graduate School of Education and the Harvard Kennedy School. Ferguson also served as a fellow for the Malcolm Wiener Center for Social Policy.

In 2014, Ferguson co-founded The Tripod Education Partners, Inc.

In 2017, Ferguson founded The Basics, Inc., a nonprofit aimed to improve the basic foundational skills of early childhood caregiving and development, which stems from works of the Academic Gap Initiative. Additionally, he is one of the co-owners of Freshpond Education, Inc.

In 2024, The Basics, Inc. has affiliated communities in the US, Australia, Brazil, and Bermuda.

== Research ==
Beginning in 1980, Ferguson initially concentrated his research on the issues surrounding economic and community development. Later this resulted in the publication of his social science synthesis volume Urban Problems and Community Development (1999). Gradually, in the latter portion of the decade, Ferguson's research shifted and began to focus on education and youth development. His work has been published by numerous organizations including, but not limited to, the U.S. Department of Education, the National Research Council, and the Brookings Institution.

In December 2007, Ferguson's book Toward Excellence with Equity: An Emerging Vision for Closing the Achievement Gap was published by Harvard Education Press and released to the public.

Ferguson's research for the past decade has focused on education and school improvement, with a focus on racial achievement gaps.

== Publications ==
=== Books ===
- Ferguson, Ronald F. "Urban Problems and Community Development". Brookings Institution Press; 1999. ISBN 0-8157-1876-4
- Ferguson, Ronald F. Toward Excellence with Equity: An Emerging Vision for Closing the Achievement Gap. Harvard Education Press; 2008. ISBN 1-891792-78-4.
- Ferguson, Ronald F. and Robertson, Tatsha The Formula: Unlocking the Secrets to Raising Highly Successful Children. BenBella Books; 2020. ISBN 1-950665-10-0.

=== Book chapters ===
- Ferguson, Ronald, and Eric Hirsch. "How Working Conditions Predict Teaching Quality and Student Outcomes." Designing Teacher Evaluation Systems: New Guidance form the Measures of Effective Teaching Project. Ed. Thomas J. Kane, Kerri A. Kerr, and Robert C. Pianta. Jossey-Bass, July 2014.
- Ferguson, Ronald, and Charlotte Danielson. "How Framework for Teaching and Tripod 7Cs Evidence Distinguish Key Components of Effective Teaching." Designing Teacher Evaluation Systems: New Guidance form the Measures of Effective Teaching Project. Ed. Thomas J. Kane, Kerri A. Kerr, and Robert C. Pianta. Jossey-Bass, July 2014.

=== Academic Journal/Scholarly Articles ===
- Ferguson, Ronald. "Elements of a 21st Century Movement for Excellence with Equity." Journal of Negro Education 83.2 (Spring 2014): 103–120

=== Research Papers/Reports ===
- Ferguson, Ronald F. Aiming Higher Together: Strategizing Better Educational Outcomes for Boys and Young Men of Color. Urban Institute. May 2016
- Ferguson, Ronald F., with Sarah F. Phillips, Jacob F. S. Rowley, and Jocelyn W. Friedlander. "The Influence of Teaching Beyond Standardized Test Scores: Engagement, Mindsets, and Agency." The Achievement Gap Initiative at Harvard University, October, 2015.
- Ferguson, Ronald, Jason Snipes, Farhana Hossain, and Michelle S. Manno. "Developing Positive Young Adults: Lessons from Two Decades of YouthBuild Programs." MDRC Research Report, May 2015.
- Ferguson, Ronald, and Sara Lamback. "Creating Pathways to Prosperity: A Blueprint for Action." The Pathways to Prosperity Project, Harvard Graduate School of Education, and the Achievement Gap Initiative at Harvard University, June 2014.
- Ferguson, Ronald. "Pathways to Prosperity: Meeting the Challenge of Preparing Teens and Young Adults for the 21st Century." Pathways to Prosperity Project, Harvard Graduate School of Education, February 2011.
- Ferguson, Ronald and Helen Ladd. “"Pioneering State Economic Strategy in Massachusetts." In R. Scott Fosler, ed., The New Economic Role of American States. New York: Oxford University Press, 1988.

== Personal life ==
Ronald Ferguson has been married for 38 years to his spouse. He is the father of two adult sons.
