= Microtraining =

Support method for informal learning processes in organisations

The Microtraining method is an approach aimed at supporting informal learning processes in organizations and companies. Learning in this sense means that an active process of knowledge creation is taking place within social interactions, but outside of formal learning environments or training facilities. This process can be facilitated by well-designed and structured systems and by supporting ways of communication and collaboration, like the Microtraining method does. A Microtraining arrangement comprises a time span of 15–20 minutes for each learning session, which can activate and maintain learning processes for a longer period if bundled into series. A Microtraining session can be held face-to-face, online or embedded in an e-learning scenario.

== Applicability ==
The Microtraining method can be applied to learning situations within organizations and companies, especially when basic knowledge needs to be refreshed or improved and when information is needed for immediate use in daily practice. In comparison to formal learning, Microtraining is an approach aimed at structuring informal learning activities. While formal learning may be a successful approach for people with less knowledge and skills [Tynjälä, 2008], it can be counter-productive for more experienced employees [Jonassen et al., 1993] for whom informal blended learning approaches like Microtraining appear to be working very well [Jonassen/Mayes/McAleese, 1993; Jonassen, 1997].

== Organizational requirements ==
With regard to organizational requirements, facilitating the new learning concept by management and accompanying the initial phase of implementing the Microtraining method are crucial for its success. Consequently, the Microtraining method is not meant to be an approach to designing learning materials alone, but involves analyzing learning processes in organizations and supporting change management of learning strategies as a whole. If, for example, employees have insufficient access to a computer or web services supporting online learning activities that are part of the Microtraining approach or if they are not allowed to spend working time learning, any effort to design the best material and collaborative surroundings will fail.

== Didactical principles ==
The Microtraining method is based on several current learning theories and concepts, one of the most important of which is the theory of Social Constructivism, which sees learning as an active process, taking into account the learner's individual background [Vygotsky, 1978]. The second crucial idea comes from the concept of connectivism, which states that learning is not an internal, solitary process, but that new knowledge is acquired best while working and learning in a lively community [Siemens, 2005].

== The method ==
Microtraining sessions are structured as follows:

1 Active start (3 minutes)

- Start with a mental activity e.g. thinking, reflecting, organizing and comparing
- Communicate the goal of the session

2 Exercise / Demonstration (6 minutes)

- Connect with different learning styles by using a combination of pictures, sounds and text
- Stimulate the learning process by giving concrete examples

3 Feedback/ Discussion (4 minutes)

- Ensure effective, direct and positive feedback
- Stimulate both discussion and knowledge sharing between participants
- Check if all participants really understand the content by asking questions

4 Conclusion: What's next? How do we learn more? (2 minutes)

- What are the topics we will discuss during the next meeting(s)
- Discuss how to retain the knowledge
- Stimulate involvement and ensure participants leave with a clear goal
